= National Register of Historic Places listings in Sandoval County, New Mexico =

Location of Sandoval County in New Mexico

This is a list of the National Register of Historic Places listings in Sandoval County, New Mexico, United States.

This is intended to be a complete list of the properties and districts on the National Register of Historic Places in Sandoval County, New Mexico, United States. Latitude and longitude coordinates are provided for many National Register properties and districts; these locations may be seen together in a map.

There are 63 properties and districts listed on the National Register in the county, including 5 National Historic Landmarks. All of the places listed on the national register are also recorded on the State Register of Cultural Properties with the exception of Big Bead Mesa, Puye Ruins, and Sandia Cave. In addition to these, Jemez State Monument and Kuaua Ruin are New Mexico Historic Sites.

This National Park Service list is complete through NPS recent listings posted May 15, 2026.

Contents: NRHP in New Mexico by county
Bernalillo – Catron – Chaves – Cibola – Colfax – Curry – De Baca – Doña Ana – Eddy – Grant – Guadalupe – Harding – Hidalgo – Lea – Lincoln – Los Alamos – Luna – McKinley – Mora – Otero – Quay – Rio Arriba – Roosevelt – San Juan – San Miguel – Sandoval – Santa Fe – Sierra – Socorro – Taos – Torrance – Union – Valencia

== Current listings ==
	Name on the Register	Image	Date listed	Location	City or town	Description
1	Abenicio Salazar Historic District	Abenicio Salazar Historic District	June 6, 1980 (#80002569)	U.S. Route 85; 35°18′50″N 106°32′44″W	Bernalillo	
2	Amoxiumqua Site (FS-530, LA481)		May 21, 1984 (#84002979)	Address Restricted	Jemez Springs	
3	Archeological Site FS-18, LA-5920		May 21, 1984 (#84002986)	Address Restricted	Jemez Springs	
4	Archeological Site FS-199, LA-135		May 21, 1984 (#84002989)	Address Restricted	Jemez Springs	
5	Archeological Site FS-3		May 21, 1984 (#84002982)	Address Restricted	Jemez Springs	LA 44000
6	Archeological Site FS-535, LA-385		May 21, 1984 (#84002991)	Address Restricted	Jemez Springs	
7	Archeological Site FS-554, LA-386		May 21, 1984 (#84002993)	Address Restricted	Jemez Springs	
8	Archeological Site FS-574		May 21, 1984 (#84002997)	Address Restricted	Jemez Springs	LA 24789
9	Archeological Site FS-575		May 21, 1984 (#84003001)	Address Restricted	Jemez Springs	LA 24790
10	Archeological Site FS-580, LA-137		May 21, 1984 (#84003002)	Address Restricted	Jemez Springs	
11	Archeological Site FS-647, LA-128		May 21, 1984 (#84003005)	Address Restricted	Jemez Springs	
12	Archeological Site FS-688		May 21, 1984 (#84003007)	Address Restricted	Jemez Springs	LA 44001
13	Archeological Site FS-689, LA-403		May 21, 1984 (#84003008)	Address Restricted	Jemez Springs	
14	Archeological Site FS-8		May 21, 1984 (#84002984)	Address Restricted	Jemez Springs	LA 46341
15	Archeological Site No. AR-03-10-03-620		April 19, 1990 (#90000590)	Address Restricted	Jemez Springs	
16	Astialakwa Archeological District (FS-360, LA-1825)	Astialakwa Archeological District (FS-360, LA-1825)	May 21, 1984 (#84003010)	Address Restricted	Jemez Springs	Astialakwa
17	Bandelier CCC Historic District	Bandelier CCC Historic District	May 28, 1987 (#87001452)	Off State Road 4; 35°46′50″N 106°16′03″W	Bandelier National Monument	Extends into Los Alamos County
18	Bandelier National Monument	Bandelier National Monument	October 15, 1966 (#66000042)	12 miles (19 km) south of Los Alamos on State Road 4; 35°46′32″N 106°19′06″W	Los Alamos	Extends into Los Alamos and Santa Fe Counties; boundary increase December 10, 2014
19	Big Bead Mesa		October 15, 1966 (#66000958)	Address Restricted	Casa Salazar	
20	Boletsakwa Site (FS-2, LA-136)		May 21, 1984 (#84003011)	Address Restricted	Jemez Springs	
21	Borrego Mesa Agricultural Site		April 19, 1990 (#90000591)	Address Restricted	Jemez Springs	
22	Cochiti Pueblo	Cochiti Pueblo	November 20, 1974 (#74001205)	27 miles (43 km) southwest of Santa Fe on the Rio Grande; 35°36′32″N 106°20′41″W	Cochiti	
23	Espinaso Ridge Pueblo		January 27, 1984 (#84003012)	Address Restricted	Budaghers	
24	Forest Service Archeological Site No. FS-7		May 21, 1984 (#84003050)	Address Restricted	Jemez Springs	LA 483
25	Guacamayo Site (FS0572, LA-189)		May 21, 1984 (#84003016)	Address Restricted	Jemez Springs	
26	Guadalupe Ruin	Guadalupe Ruin	March 24, 1980 (#80002571)	Address Restricted	Guadalupe	
27	Hanakwa Site (FS-578)		May 21, 1984 (#84003019)	Address Restricted	Jemez Springs	
28	Holiday Mesa Logging Camp		September 11, 1992 (#92001181)	Address Restricted	Jemez Springs	
29	Hot Springs Pueblo (FS-505, Bj-73)		May 21, 1984 (#84003022)	Northeast of Jemez Springs, off State Road 4; 35°49′42″N 106°38′37″W	Jemez Springs	
30	Jemez Cave		April 19, 1990 (#90000593)	Address Restricted	Jemez Springs	
31	Jemez Pueblo	Jemez Pueblo	May 2, 1977 (#77000926)	28 miles (45 km) north of Bernalillo on State Road 4; 35°36′49″N 106°43′41″W	Jemez Pueblo	
32	Jemez State Monument	Jemez State Monument	March 14, 1973 (#73001147)	State Road 4; 35°46′38″N 106°41′11″W	Jemez Springs	State Historic Site
33	Kiashita Site		May 21, 1984 (#84003023)	Northwest of Jemez Springs; 35°49′39″N 106°44′30″W	Jemez Springs	
34	Kiatsukwa Site (FS-31 and 504, LA-132 and 133)		May 21, 1984 (#84003026)	Address Restricted	Jemez Springs	
35	Kuaua Ruin	Kuaua Ruin	January 1, 1976 (#76001199)	address=Coronado State Monument; 35°19′51″N 106°33′26″W	Bernalillo	Coronado State Historic Site
36	Kwastiyukwa Site (FS-11, LA-482)		May 21, 1984 (#84003029)	Address Restricted	Jemez Springs	
37	Nanishagi Site (FS-320, LA-541)		May 21, 1984 (#84003033)	Address Restricted	Jemez Springs	
38	Our Lady of Sorrows Church	Our Lady of Sorrows Church	April 29, 1977 (#77000927)	U.S. Route 85; 35°18′55″N 106°32′48″W	Bernalillo	
39	Patokwa Site (FS-5, LA-96)		May 21, 1984 (#84003037)	Address Restricted	Jemez Springs	
40	Pejunkwa Site (FS-571, LA-130)		May 21, 1984 (#84003039)	Address Restricted	Jemez Springs	
41	Pueblo of Santo Domingo (Kiua)	Pueblo of Santo Domingo (Kiua)	December 12, 1973 (#73001145)	35 miles (56 km) northeast of Albuquerque, off Interstate 25; 35°30′49″N 106°21′49″W	Albuquerque	
42	Pueblo Tuerto		January 19, 1984 (#84003042)	Address Restricted	Budaghers	
43	Puye Ruins	Puye Ruins	October 15, 1966 (#66000481)	Address Restricted	Espanola	Extends into Rio Arriba County
44	Roosevelt School	Roosevelt School	March 15, 1996 (#96000266)	Calle Malinche; 35°18′16″N 106°33′04″W	Bernalillo	
45	San Jose de las Huertas		July 5, 1990 (#90001029)	Address Restricted	Placitas	
46	San Jose de los Jemez Mission and Giusewa Pueblo Site	San Jose de los Jemez Mission and Giusewa Pueblo Site	October 16, 2012 (#12001007)	18160 New Mexico State Road 4; 35°46′43″N 106°41′12″W	Jemez Springs	
47	San Juan Mesa Ruin		July 9, 1970 (#70000408)	Address Restricted	Jemez Springs	
48	San Ysidro Church	San Ysidro Church	July 30, 1980 (#80002570)	Church Rd. 35°14′01″N 106°36′53″W	Corrales	
49	Sandia Cave	Sandia Cave	October 15, 1966 (#66000487)	Along State Road 156 south of Placitas; 35°15′17″N 106°24′22″W	Bernalillo	
50	Santo Domingo Indian Trading Post	Santo Domingo Indian Trading Post	January 9, 1998 (#97001592)	Former U.S. Route 66 crossing of the Santa Fe railroad tracks at Domingo; 35°30′41″N 106°19′15″W	Domingo	Operated as a trading post from 1922 to 1995.
51	Tamaya		November 1, 1974 (#74001204)	North of Bernalillo; 35°25′41″N 106°37′03″W	Bernalillo	Santa Ana Pueblo
52	Tonque Pueblo	Tonque Pueblo	January 12, 1984 (#84003045)	Southeast of San Felipe Pueblo; 35°21′49″N 106°21′07″W	Tejon Grant	
53	Tostaskwinu Site (FS-579, LA-479)		May 21, 1984 (#84003047)	Address Restricted	Jemez Springs	
54	Tovakwa Site		May 21, 1984 (#84003049)	Address Restricted	Jemez Springs	
55	Unshagi Site (FS-337, LA-123)		May 21, 1984 (#84003051)	Address Restricted	Jemez Springs	
56	Virgin Canyon Logging Camp No. 1		September 11, 1992 (#92001180)	Address Restricted	Jemez Springs	
57	Virgin Mesa Logging Camp No. 1		September 11, 1992 (#92001182)	Address Restricted	Jemez Springs	
58	Virgin Mesa Logging Camp No. 2		September 11, 1992 (#92001183)	Address Restricted	Jemez Springs	
59	Virgin Mesa Logging Camp No. 3		September 11, 1992 (#92001184)	Address Restricted	Jemez Springs	
60	Virgin Mesa Rock Art Site		April 19, 1990 (#90000592)	Address Restricted	Jemez Springs	
61	Wabakwa Site (FS-400, LA-478)		May 21, 1984 (#84003052)	Address Restricted	Jemez Springs	
62	Wahajhamka (FS-573)		May 21, 1984 (#84003053)	Address Restricted	Jemez Springs	
63	Zia Pueblo	Zia Pueblo	April 3, 1973 (#73001146)	18 miles (29 km) west of Bernalillo on State Road 44; 35°30′22″N 106°43′41″W	Zia Pueblo	

== See also ==
- List of National Historic Landmarks in New Mexico
- National Register of Historic Places listings in New Mexico
