= New Mexico State Road 22 =

State highway in New Mexico, United States

State Road 22
- NM 22 highlighted in red

Route information
- Maintained by NMDOT
- Length: 13.941 mi (22.436 km)

Major junctions
- South end: I-25 / US 85 by Budaghers
- NM 16 in Peña Blanca
- North end: BIA-85 in Cochiti Pueblo

Location
- Country: United States
- State: New Mexico
- Counties: Sandoval

Highway system
- New Mexico State Highway System; Interstate; US; State; Scenic
← NM 21	→ NM 23

State Road 22 (NM 22) is a state highway in the US state of New Mexico. Its total length is approximately 13.9 miles (22.4 km). NM 22's southern terminus is in the village of Budaghers at Interstate 25 (I 25)/U.S. 85 (US 85), and the northern terminus is in Cochiti Pueblo where it continues as BIA-85.

== Major intersections ==
County	Location	mi	km	Destinations	Notes
Sandoval	Budaghers	0.000	0.000	I-25 / US 85	Southern terminus
Sandoval	Peña Blanca	9.421	15.162	NM 16 east	Western terminus of NM 16
Sandoval	Cochiti Pueblo	13.941	22.436	Continues as BIA-85	Northern terminus
1.000 mi = 1.609 km; 1.000 km = 0.621 mi
