= Dorothy Keur =

American cultural anthropologist (1904–1989)

Dorothy L. Keur (née Strouse; 1904–1989) was an American cultural anthropologist specializing in Navajo and Netherlands cultures. She was a professor at Hunter College and was the president of the American Ethnological Society from 1974 to 1979.

== Early life ==
Dorothy Louise Strouse was born on February 13, 1904, in New York City. Keur was an only child; her father was a cutter and buyer of necktie silks, while her mother was a homemaker and fundamentalist Protestant who had missionary ambitions for her daughter. At the time, higher education degrees were uncommon among women, but Keur was motivated to pursue a degree from Hunter College with the motivation of her teachers at Morris High School (Bronx); she graduated from Hunter College in 1925.

== Higher education and early career ==
During her undergraduate program, she formed a close relationship with Professor Edward Sanford Burgess, and when she graduated, she was offered a laboratory assistant position in his group. Half of her salary was returned each month to Burgess so that he could purchase Indian artifacts for the college. One of her duties as laboratory assistant became daily visits to the American Museum of Natural History as educational trips for students. During one particular visit, Henry Fairfield Osborn, president of the Museum, observed her interactions with the students and was so impressed by her faculty for anthropological studies that he urged her to pursue higher education. Encouraged by Osborn, Keur obtained a Master of Arts degree from Columbia University in 1928. Within only one year of her graduation, new archaeological data disproved her thesis.

Shortly after Keur obtained her Master of Arts degree, her longtime mentor Burgess suffered a stroke and was obliged to retire. Elsie Steedman filled the vacant post, making the anthropology department entirely female until the end of World War II. With Steedman's support, Dorothy was promoted to the rank of instructor in 1928. The same year, Dorothy married John Y. Keur, who at the time was a forestry student at Yale. The arrival of Duncan William Strong to the faculty at Columbia University impelled Keur to enroll in the PhD program, from which she graduated in 1941.

== Anthropological activities ==
While a professor at Hunter College and during her earlier dissertation research, Keur was heavily involved in anthropological research. Her prolific career has received many awards and she has held many prominent positions, such as president of the American Ethnological Society from 1974 to 1979, and a Fellow and anthropological chair of the New York Academy of Sciences. Keur's teaching during this time also stressed the biological unity of Homo sapiens as an approach for dispelling rampant racism at the time.

=== Big Bead Mesa ===
As part of her dissertation research, Keur conducted significant research at Big Bead Mesa, a Navajo settlement in New Mexico that was inhabited from around 1745 to 1812. In 1986, Keur received a New Mexico Governor's Award of Honor for Historic Preservation for her work at the site. For her work at Big Bead Mesa and other sites in New Mexico where Navajo and Pueblo lived in close proximity, Keur was recognized as one of the "Daughters of the Desert" at the 1986 Conference on Women Anthropologists of the Native American Southwest.

=== Anderden community ===
In 1952, with support from a Fulbright Program grant Dorothy and her husband John traveled to Anderen, a small village in the Drenthe Province in the Netherlands, to conduct a one-year anthropological study of traditional village life. Their field research was the first anthropological study conducted in the Netherlands. Anderen, population 280, was an interesting community for anthropological study - the Saxon people married almost entirely within the village and its neighboring towns, such that the town was really one large family, engendering a strong sense of community. Dorothy and John concluded their study by publishing a monograph with the American Ethnological Society. This book was widely read in the Netherlands, and was even at one time used as a supplementary textbook for a sociology course at the University of Nijmegen

== Personal life ==
Keur retired from Hunter College in 1965, soon to be followed by her husband's retirement from Brooklyn College in 1966. In retirement, she divided her time between a log cabin in Montana and their apartment in Riverdale. Dorothy died on March 22, 1989, at St. Vincent's Hospital in Billings, Montana, survived by her husband.
