= Richard Gordon Vivian =

American archaeologist and anthropologist

Richard Gordon Vivian (August 27, 1908 – April 29, 1966) was an American archaeologist and anthropologist who worked primarily with ruins and archaeological sites in the American Southwest. Vivian was a longtime employee of the National Park Service, working to stabilize and investigate a variety of sites, including Chaco Canyon in New Mexico.

== Early life and education ==
Richard Gordon Vivian was born to Stanley and Millie Vivian August 27, 1908 in Laurium, Michigan. Vivian and his mother spent the summer of 1913 in Globe, Arizona, with his grandfather. Other than that summer, he lived in Michigan with his parents until 1918, when they moved to Albuquerque, New Mexico, where his father started a dairy business.

In high school in Albuquerque, Vivian visited local archaeological sites, sparking his interest in archaeology and anthropology. His father and grandfather had both worked in mines and been carpenters, and witnessing their work also influenced Vivian's interest in these fields.

Vivian began attending the University of New Mexico in 1927, earning a Bachelor of Arts with a major in archaeology and a minor in geology in 1931. By 1932 he had also earned a master's degree in archaeology from the University of New Mexico. Vivian was a student of the first University of New Mexico Field School at Chaco Canyon.

== Career ==
After obtaining his master's degree, Vivian led excavations for the School of American Research in Chaco, Puaray, and Kuaua until 1935. From 1935 to 1936, he taught anthropology at the Hockaday School for Girls in Dallas, Texas.

Following his short-lived attempt at a career as a schoolteacher, Vivian worked for nearly 27 years for the United States government. Nearly all of that time was spent in the employ of the National Park Service, investigating and stabilizing ruins across the American Southwest and overseeing digs and related projects. From 1942 to 1946, he joined the Army Corps of Engineers in Pecos, Texas, before returning to his post with the National Park Service.

Vivian worked closely with his assistant Roland Richert for 15 years of his career. On March 7, 1953, the National Park Service awarded Vivian the Meritorious Service Award for his years of work on ruins stabilization. Vivian published a number of works on various archaeological sites in the American Southwest during his time with the National Park Service that were reviewed and cited in journals of archaeology.

== Personal life and death ==
Vivian married Myrtle Perce on November 19, 1934. Perce was a schoolteacher as well as a fellow student of anthropology and a photographer. They had three children together: one son, Gwinn, and two daughters, Ruth (1940–1997) and Anne.

Vivian died at the age of 57 on April 29, 1966, after battling leukemia for four years.

== Published works ==
- Vivian, Richard Gordon. "A Re-Study of the Province of Tiguex". January 1, 1932.
- Vivian, Richard Gordon. The Hubbard Site and Other Tri-Wall Structures in New Mexico and Colorado. First Edition. National Park Service, 1959.
- Vivian, Richard Gordon and Reiter, Paul. The Great Kivas of Chaco Canyon and Their Relationships. United States: School of American Research, 1960.
- Vivian, Richard Gordon. Gran Quivira: Excavations in a 17th-century Jumano Pueblo. United States: National Park Service, U.S. Department of the Interior, 1964.
- Vivian, Richard Gordon; Mathews, Tom W.; and Reed, Erik Kellerman. Kin Kletso: A Pueblo III Community in Chaco Canyon, New Mexico. United States: Southwestern Monuments Association, 1965.
- Vivian, Richard Gordon. The Three-C Site, an Early Pueblo II Ruin in Chaco Canyon, New Mexico. First Edition. University of New Mexico Press, 1965.
