= Abenicio Salazar Historic District =

- U.S. National Register of Historic Places
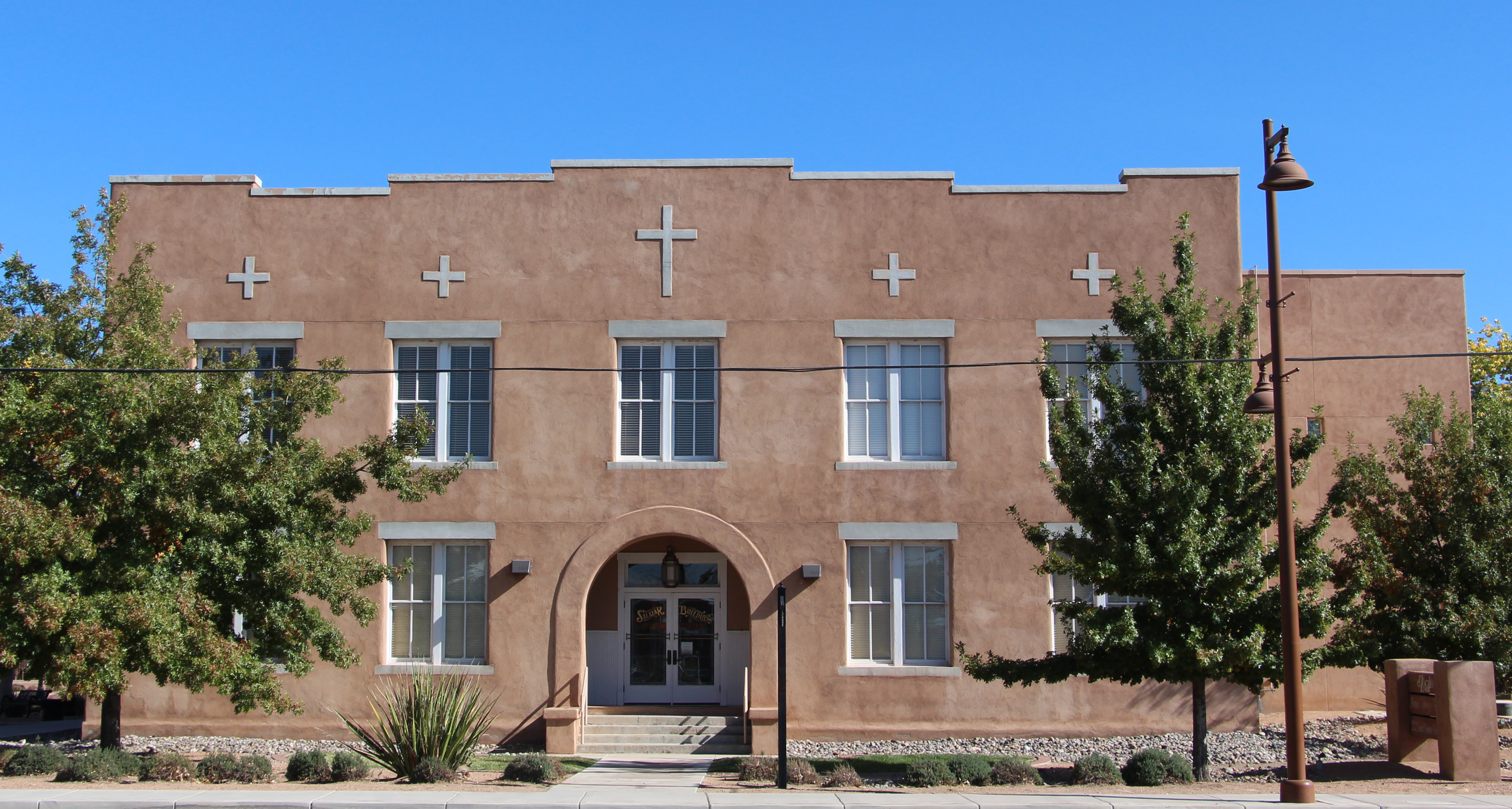
- Our Lady of Sorrows High School

- Location within New Mexico
- Location: Camino del Pueblo, Bernalillo, New Mexico
- Coordinates: 35°18′50″N 106°32′44″W
- Area: 9 acres (3.6 ha)
- Built: 1874, 1922
- Built by: Salazar, Abenicio; Salazar, Benicio
- Architectural style: Classical Revival, Territorial Style
- NRHP reference No.: 80002569
- Added to NRHP: June 6, 1980

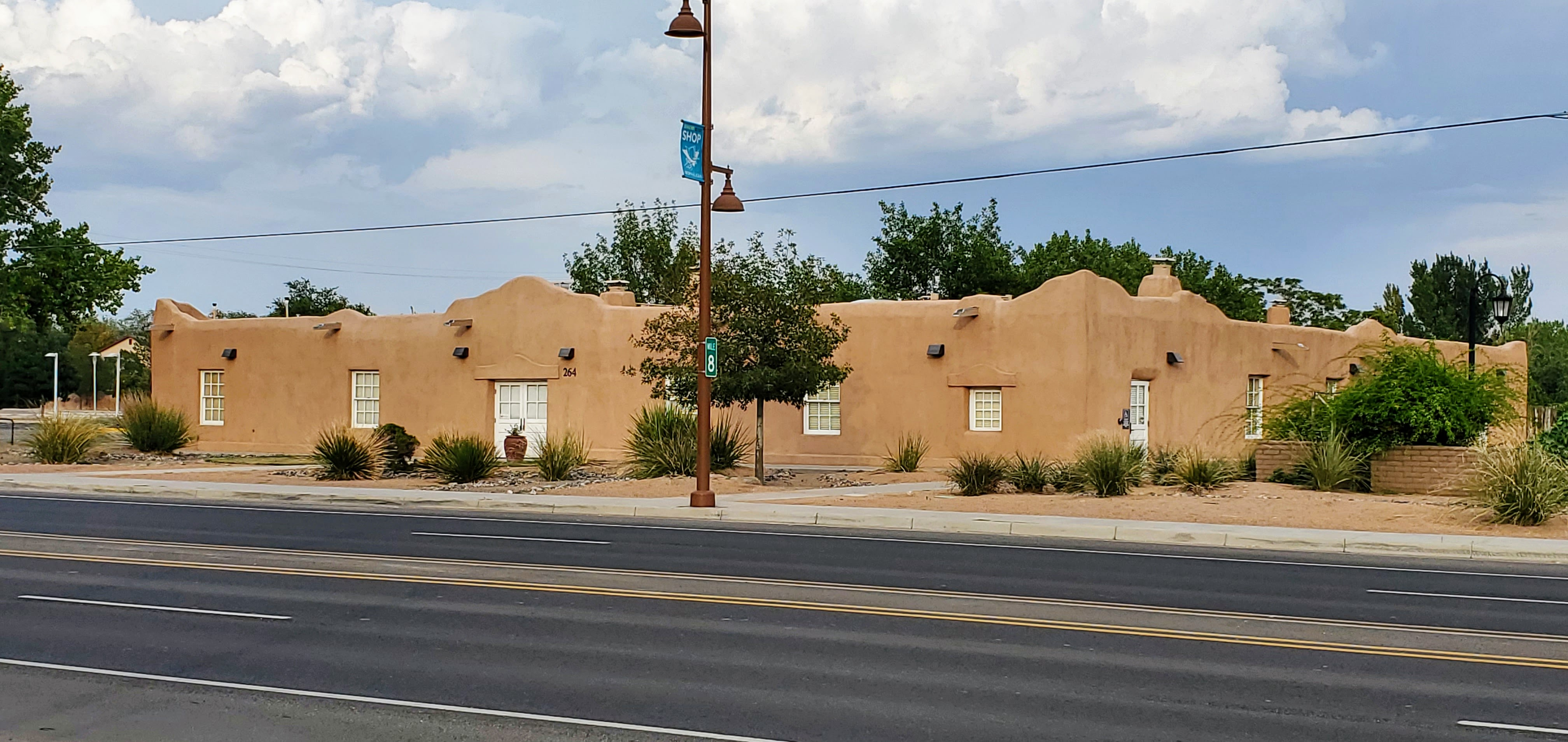
Our Lady of Sorrows Convent, 2022

The Abenicio Salazar Historic District, on Camino del Pueblo (former routing of U.S. Route 85) in Bernalillo, New Mexico, was listed on the National Register of Historic Places in 1980. The listing included 13 contributing buildings on 9 acres (3.6 ha).

It includes the Our Lady of Sorrows High School, a two-story building built in 1922 by local builder Abenicio Salazar (1857-1941). Abenicio Salazar "built the larqest adobe buildings in the Bernalillo area including this building. He built the flour mill, a fire wall for the lumber mill, the coal mining town of Hagan, and a number of houses", but the school is the only large one surviving in good condition.

It is across the street from NRHP-listed Our Lady of Sorrows Church.
