= Fashion Outlets of Santa Fe =

- Location: Santa Fe, New Mexico, United States
- Coordinates: 35.61044°N 106.03217°W
- Address: 8380 Cerrillos Road
- Opened: 1993
- Developer: Ginsburg Craig and Associates
- Owner: 8380 LLC
- Num. of stores: 35
- Floor area: 122,000 sq ft (11,300 m^{2})
- Floors: 1
- Website: fashionoutletssantafe.com

The Fashion Outlets of Santa Fe is an outdoor shopping mall in Santa Fe, New Mexico that opened in 1993. The shopping center is owned by 8380 LLC. It is the sole outlet mall in the state of New Mexico, and one of three malls within the city.

== Background ==
The Santa Fe Factory Outlets was curated by California-based developer Steve Craig of Ginsburg Craig and Associates in 1990. At the time, the shopping center was one of two outlet malls simultaneously being developed within the state. The New Mexico Outlet Center also opened a complex in Budaghers, New Mexico in 1993.

== History ==
=== 1993–2016 ===
Ginsburg Craig and Associates developed the first phase of the center by 1993, and announced a second and third phase would follow. The first phase of the project cost $8 million to develop. In 1997, the property owners Chelsea GCA Realty partnered with Michigan based Horizon Group Inc. Horizon Group also owned and operated nearby New Mexico Outlet Center. Following the partnership, several tenants from the Budaghers shopping center relocated to the Santa Fe Factory Outlets. A few years later, the Albuquerque-based reality company Gulfstream Group purchased the property. The new owners would change the name to Santa Fe Premium Outlets. In 2007, Talisman Cos. LLC purchased the property for $9.3 million and acquired several new tenants. In 2009, the shopping center added a Nike Factory Outlet store as an anchor. Nike quietly closed the location in 2016.

=== 2017–present ===
The property owners faced a foreclosure lawsuit with the lender over an $11 million loan default. In 2023, five years after the loan default with Wells Fargo, the property sold for $5.9 million. Colliers sold the property to 8380 LLC, with the intent to rebrand the center as a marketplace.
