= Our Lady of Sorrows Church (Bernalillo, New Mexico) =

Historic church in New Mexico, United States

- U.S. National Register of Historic Places
- NM State Register of Cultural Properties
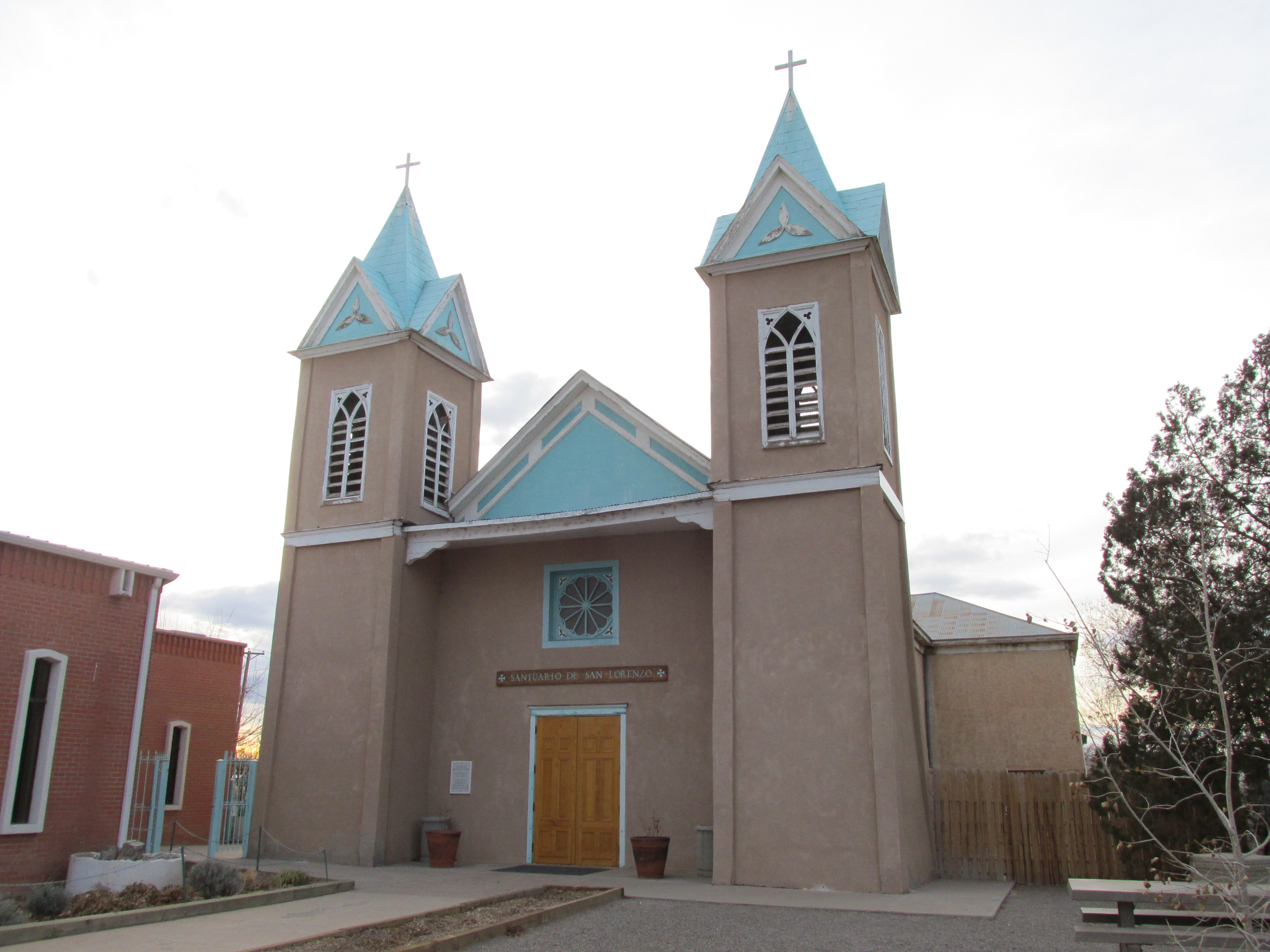
- Santuario de San Lorenzo

- Location within New Mexico Location within the United States
- Location: I-25, Bernalillo, New Mexico
- Coordinates: 35°18′55″N 106°32′48″W
- Area: 2 acres (0.81 ha)
- Built: 1857
- Architect: Fr. Joseph Failon
- Architectural style: Territorial Style
- NRHP reference No.: 77000927
- NMSRCP No.: 164

Significant dates
- Added to NRHP: April 29, 1977
- Designated NMSRCP: March 20, 1970

The Our Lady of Sorrows Church in Bernalillo, New Mexico is a historic church on U.S. Route 85/I-25. It was built in 1857 and added to the National Register of Historic Places in 1977.

It is a cruciform-shaped 120 by 65 feet (37 m × 20 m) stuccoed adobe brick building which served as a church for over 100 years. An adjacent modern brick church replaced it in 1971.

== See also ==
- National Register of Historic Places listings in Sandoval County, New Mexico
