= Roosevelt School (Bernalillo, New Mexico) =

Historic place in New Mexico, United States

- U.S. National Register of Historic Places
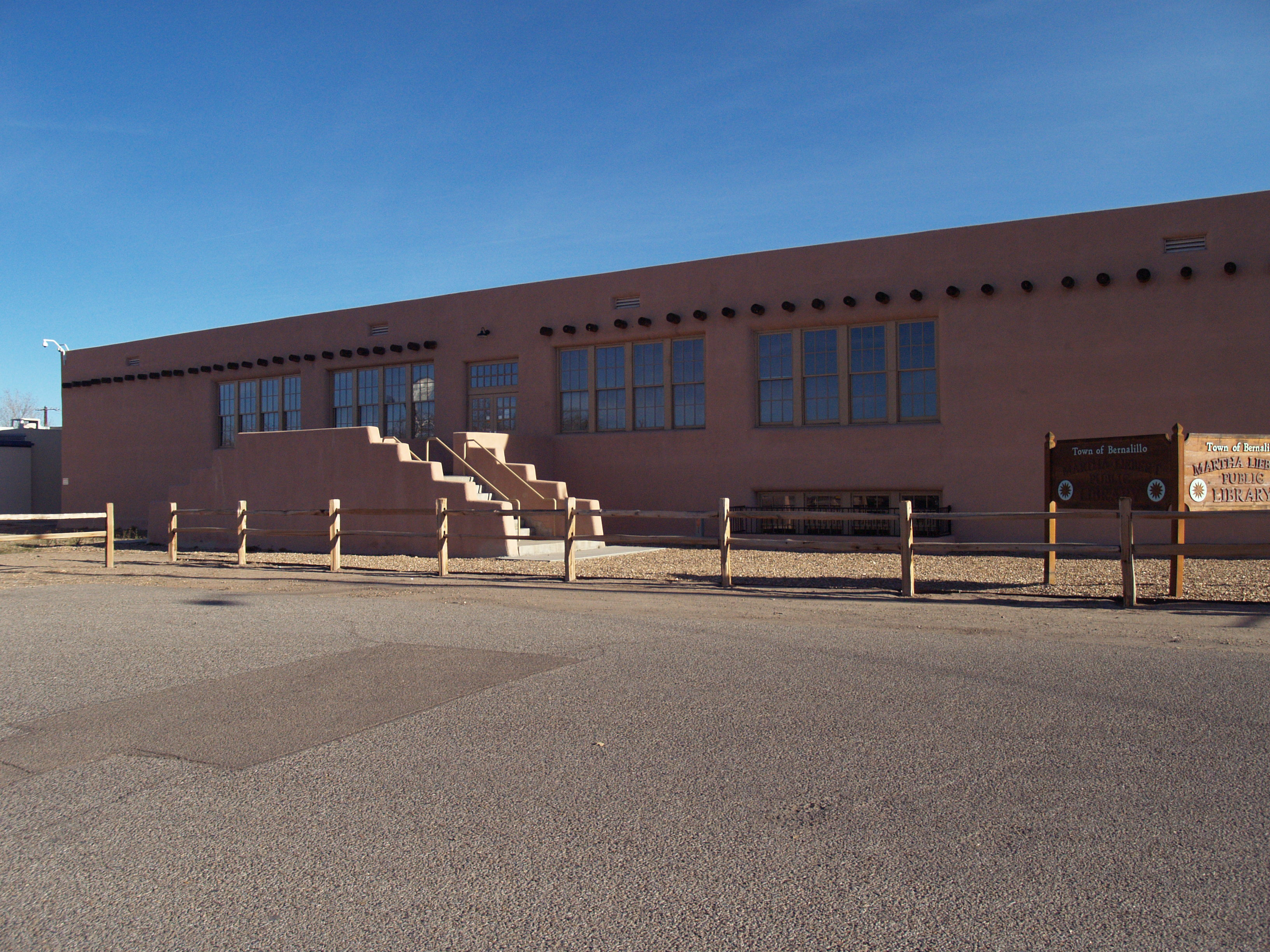

- Location within New Mexico Location within the United States
- Location: Calle Malinche; Bernalillo, New Mexico
- Coordinates: 35°18′16″N 106°33′04″W
- Area: 1 acre (0.40 ha)
- Built: 1935-36
- Built by: Works Progress Administration
- Architectural style: Mission/Spanish Revival
- MPS: New Deal in New Mexico MPS
- NRHP reference No.: 96000266
- Added to NRHP: March 15, 1996

The Roosevelt School in Bernalillo, New Mexico was begun as a Federal Emergency Relief Administration project in 1935 and completed as a Works Progress Administration project in 1936. It was listed on the National Register of Historic Places in 1996.

It is a one-story "Spanish-Pueblo Revival Style building" built with reinforced concrete structure. Its walls are adobe brick covered by a cream-colored stucco. It has a continuous parapet with projecting vigas.
