= New Mexico State Road 23 =

State highway in New Mexico, United States

State Road 23

Route information
- Maintained by NMDOT
- Existed: mid 1930s–mid 1980s

Major junctions
- Southern end: Acoma Pueblo
- Northern end: I-40

Location
- Country: United States
- State: New Mexico
- Counties: Rio Arriba

Highway system
- New Mexico State Highway System; Interstate; US; State; Scenic
← NM 22	→ NM 24

State Road 23 (NM 23) was a state highway in the US state of New Mexico. NM 23's southern terminus was in Acoma Pueblo, and the northern terminus was at Interstate 40 (I-40). It was established in the mid-1930s and removed from highway system by the mid-1980s. It is now known as Indian Route 23.
