= Tamaya (Bernalillo, New Mexico) =

Pueblo in Sandoval County, United States

- U.S. National Register of Historic Places
- Location within New Mexico Location within the United States
- Nearest city: Bernalillo, New Mexico
- Coordinates: 35°25′41″N 106°37′03″W
- Area: 21.5 acres (8.7 ha)
- Built: 1694
- Built by: Diego Arias de Espinoza (1734 reconstruction)
- Architectural style: Pueblo
- NRHP reference No.: 74001204
- Added to NRHP: November 1, 1974

Tamaya, also known as Santa Ana Pueblo, 9 miles (14 km) north of Bernalillo, New Mexico, dates from 1694. It was listed on the National Register of Historic Places in 1974. The listing included 21 contributing buildings on 21.5 acres (8.7 ha).

It was rebuilt in 1734 by Fray Diego Arias de Espinoza. It is included in the modern Santa Ana Pueblo CDP.
