= San Ysidro Church =

Historic church in New Mexico, United States

- U.S. National Register of Historic Places
- NM State Register of Cultural Properties
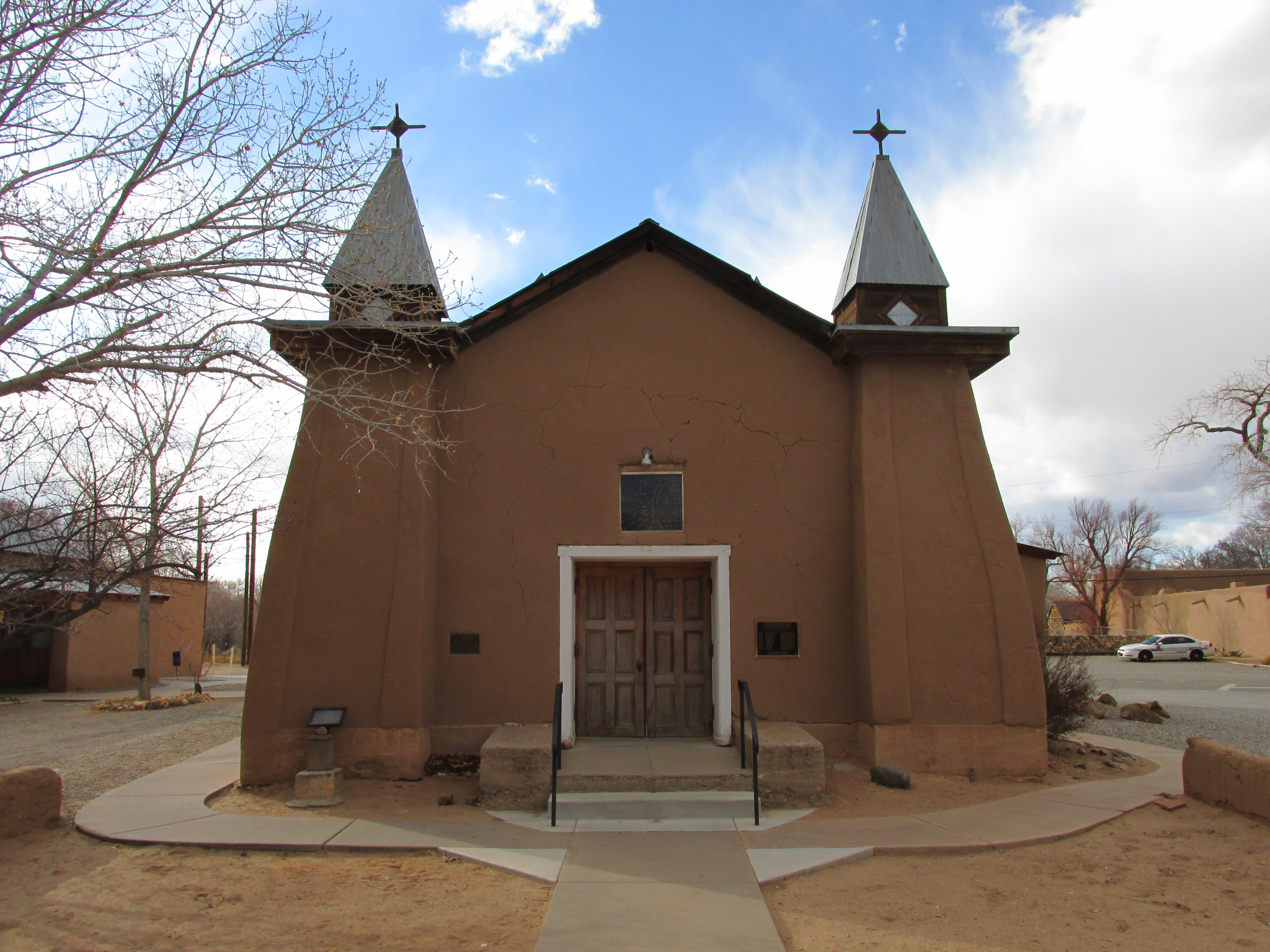
- San Ysidro Church

- Location within New Mexico Location within the United States
- Location: Church Rd., Corrales, New Mexico
- Coordinates: 35°14′1″N 106°36′53″W
- Area: less than one acre
- Built: 1868
- NRHP reference No.: 80002570
- NMSRCP No.: 726

Significant dates
- Added to NRHP: July 30, 1980
- Designated NMSRCP: June 22, 1979

San Ysidro Church is a historic church on Church Road in Corrales, New Mexico. It was erected in 1868 and added to the National Register of Historic Places in 1980.

It is the second of three churches named after Saint Isidore (Ysidro), the patron saint of farmers. It is a one-story adobe church with towers added in 1929.

== See also ==
- National Register of Historic Places listings in Sandoval County, New Mexico
