= Coronado Historic Site =

- Kuaua Ruin
- U.S. National Register of Historic Places
- New Mexico Historic Site
- NM State Register of Cultural Properties
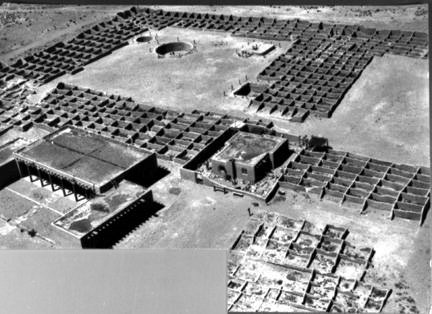
- Aerial view of Kuaua ruins, circa 1940

- Location within New Mexico Location within the United States
- Nearest city: Bernalillo, New Mexico
- Coordinates: 35°19′51″N 106°33′26″W
- Area: 5.7 acres (2.3 ha)
- Built: 1939
- Architect: John Gaw Meem
- Architectural style: Pueblo
- NRHP reference No.: 76001199
- NMSRCP No.: 225

Significant dates
- Added to NRHP: January 1, 1976
- Designated NMHS: 1935
- Designated NMSRCP: December 30, 1971

Coronado Historic Site is the Tiwa pueblo of Kuaua and a historic site that is part of the State-governed Museum of New Mexico system. It is located along U.S. Federal Route 550, 1 mile west of Bernalillo and 16 miles north of Albuquerque.

== History ==
The Coronado Historic Site is most noted for Kuaua Pueblo (Tiwa for "evergreen"). The pueblo or village was settled about 1325 and abandoned toward the end of the 16th century. The Coronado Historic Site was the first state archaeological site to open to the public. It was dedicated on May 29, 1940, as part of the Cuarto Centenario commemoration (400th Anniversary) of Francisco Vásquez de Coronado's entry into New Mexico. James F. Zimmerman was its first president. Although it is named for Vasquez de Coronado, who camped in the vicinity in 1540–1542, the site is of Kuaua Pueblo which was one of several Tiwa-speaking pueblos in the area when the Vasquez de Coronado arrived, and the village was almost certainly abandoned due to Coronado and the after effects of the Tiguex War (February 1541).

The ruins of Kuaua Pueblo were excavated from 1934 to 1939 by an archaeological team led by Edgar Lee Hewett and Marjorie F. Tichy (later Lambert). The excavation revealed a south-to-north development over the village's three centuries of existence, as well as six kivas built in round, square and rectangular shapes. The site is particularly noted for a series of pre-contact (pre-1541) murals that were recovered from a square kiva in the pueblo's south plaza. These murals represent one of the finest examples of pre-contact Native American art to be found anywhere in North America.

== Visitor Center ==
The Coronado visitor center was designed by noted Southwest architect John Gaw Meem. It displays fourteen of the restored kiva murals as well as Pueblo Indian and Spanish Colonial artifacts. An interpretive trail winds through the ruins and along the west bank of the Rio Grande.

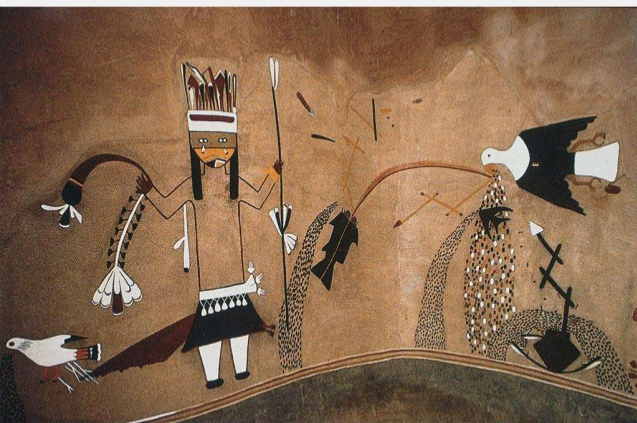
Kuaua pueblo Kiva mural (restored), late 15th to early 16th century

== See also ==
- National Register of Historic Places listings in Sandoval County, New Mexico
