= New Mexico State Road 16 =

State highway in New Mexico, United States

State Road 16
- El Camino Real
- NM 16 highlighted in red

Route information
- Maintained by NMDOT
- Length: 10.500 mi (16.898 km)

Major junctions
- West end: NM 22 near Pena Blanca
- East end: I-25 / US 85

Location
- Country: United States
- State: New Mexico
- Counties: Sandoval, Santa Fe

Highway system
- New Mexico State Highway System; Interstate; US; State; Scenic
← NM 15	→ NM 17

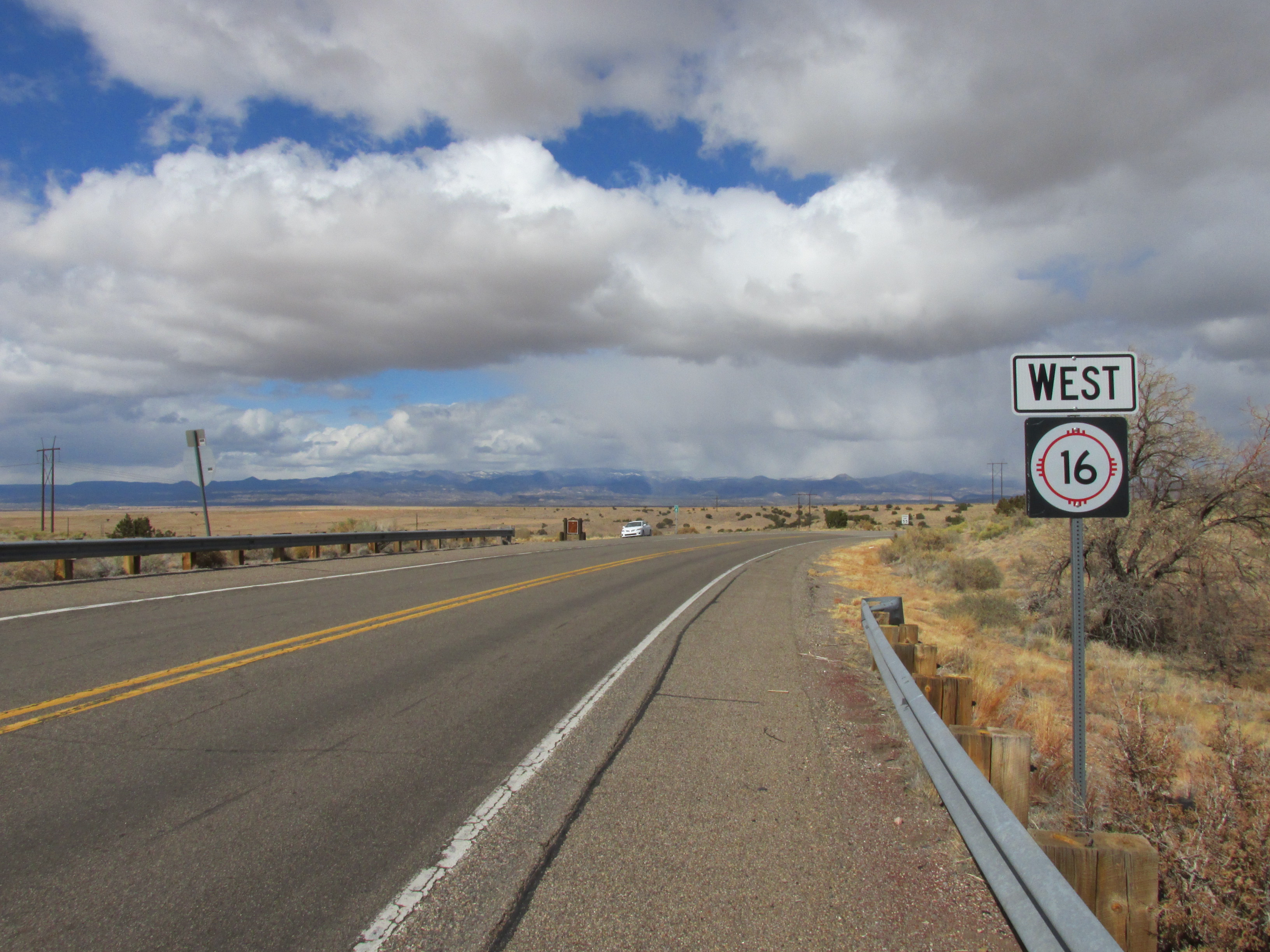
NM 16 westbound in Santa Fe County.

State Road 16 (NM 16) is a 10.5-mile-long (16.9 km) state highway in the U.S. state of New Mexico. It runs from NM 22 near Pena Blanca to Interstate 25 (I-25)/ U.S. Route 85 (US 85).

== Route description ==
The route begins at an intersection with SR 22 north of Pena Blanca. From there, it heads southeastward through a desert landscape with the name of El Camino Real. Running through the Cochiti Indian Reservation, the road meets Dam Crest Road, which serves Cochiti Lake along the Rio Grande. At Tetilla Peak Road, the area south of the route becomes part of the Zia Indian Reservation. The route then crosses from Sandoval County into Santa Fe County. The route ends at an interchange with I-25.

== Major intersections ==
County	Location	mi	km	Destinations	Notes
Sandoval		0.000	0.000	NM 22 – Pena Blanca, Cochiti Pueblo	Western terminus
Santa Fe		10.500	16.898	I-25 / US 85 – Albuquerque, Santa Fe	Eastern terminus; I-25 exit 264
1.000 mi = 1.609 km; 1.000 km = 0.621 mi
