= Jemez Historic Site =

- San José de los Jémez Mission and Gíusewa Pueblo Site
- U.S. National Register of Historic Places
- U.S. National Historic Landmark
- New Mexico Historic Site
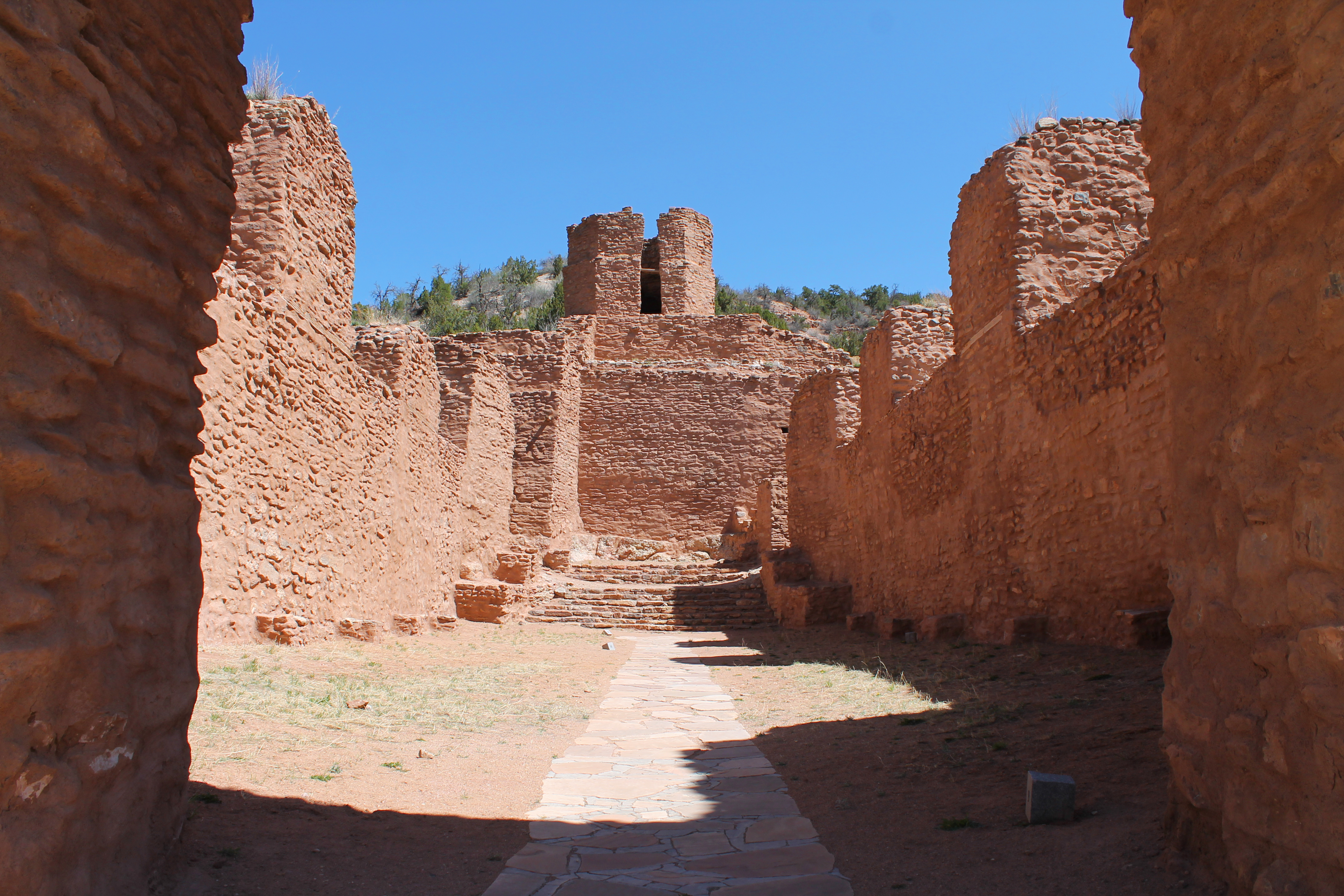
- Nave of the San José de los Jémez Mission Church

- Location within New Mexico Location within the United States
- Location: NM 4, Jemez Springs, New Mexico
- Coordinates: 35°46′38″N 106°41′11″W
- Area: 6 acres (2.4 ha)
- Built: 1621
- Architect: Fr. Gerónimo Zárate Salmerón
- Architectural style: Pueblo
- NRHP reference No.: 73001147

Significant dates
- Added to NRHP: March 14, 1973
- Designated NHL: October 16, 2012
- Designated NMHS: 1935

The Jemez Historic Site (formerly Jemez State Monument) is a state-operated historic site on New Mexico State Road 4 in Jemez Springs, New Mexico. The site preserves the archaeological remains of the 16th-century Native American Gíusewa Pueblo (Jemez: Gįųsewǎtöwǎ) and the 17th-century Spanish colonial mission called San José de los Jémez. The site was listed on the National Register of Historic Places in 1973, and in 2012 it was designated as a National Historic Landmark. It is considered an ancestral site of the Jemez Pueblo people who live nearby.

== Description ==
The Jemez Historic Site is located north of the village of Jemez Springs, in the Jemez River valley. It is on the east side of New Mexico State Road 4, near the mouth of Church Canyon. The site is about 6 acres (2.4 ha) in size, and includes partially stabilized remains of a Towa Native American pueblo and a Spanish mission compound. The principal feature of the latter are the remnant walls of the church, which at 110 feet (34 m) in length represent one of the largest 17th-century mission churches known in the state. The church walls are built mainly out of limestone, with some sandstone and volcanic tuff. Portions have been finished in the traditional mud plaster style, and have had partial restorative and preservative work done on the wall tops to limit erosion. The walls range in thickness between 6 and 7 feet (1.8 and 2.1 m) at their bases. Near the church are the foundational remnants of another structure, probably used as a residence by the priest, and another Spanish foundation that was probably a civic building. On the south side of the church is a small plaza that also has a cemetery.

Adjacent to the mission are the remains of a medium-sized pueblo. It had an estimated 200 rooms in five blocks, including two kivas, and would probably have originally looked similar to surviving pueblos such as Taos Pueblo. The kivas in the Jemez Historical site are square or rectangular in shape, unlike the circular ones found elsewhere. Portions of the pueblo have been excavated and are open to visitors, while others have been backfilled or plastered over to limit damage by erosion or weather.

== History ==
The Gíusewa Pueblo was probably established in the second half of the 15th century, and was first described by Spanish explorers in 1581. A small mission was apparently established next to the pueblo in 1598, but the present surviving structures were begun in 1621. The church was completed in 1623, but damaged by fire not long after, and was again worked on in 1625-26. There was apparently no settled priest, with Franciscan friars making repeated attempts to convert the puebloans until about 1639. The Jémez people continued to occupy the pueblo, and even built a square kiva in one part of the mission compound. The pueblo was abandoned in 1680, when the Jémez participated in the Pueblo Rebellion which evicted the Spanish from the region until 1692. Over time, the forces of nature took their toll on the buildings, resulting in the collapse of the church roof, and the partial collapse of its walls. The site first underwent major excavation in 1910 and 1922, at which time stabilization of some of its features began. The state also acquired the land at that time, and it was designated a state monument in 1935.

== Gallery ==
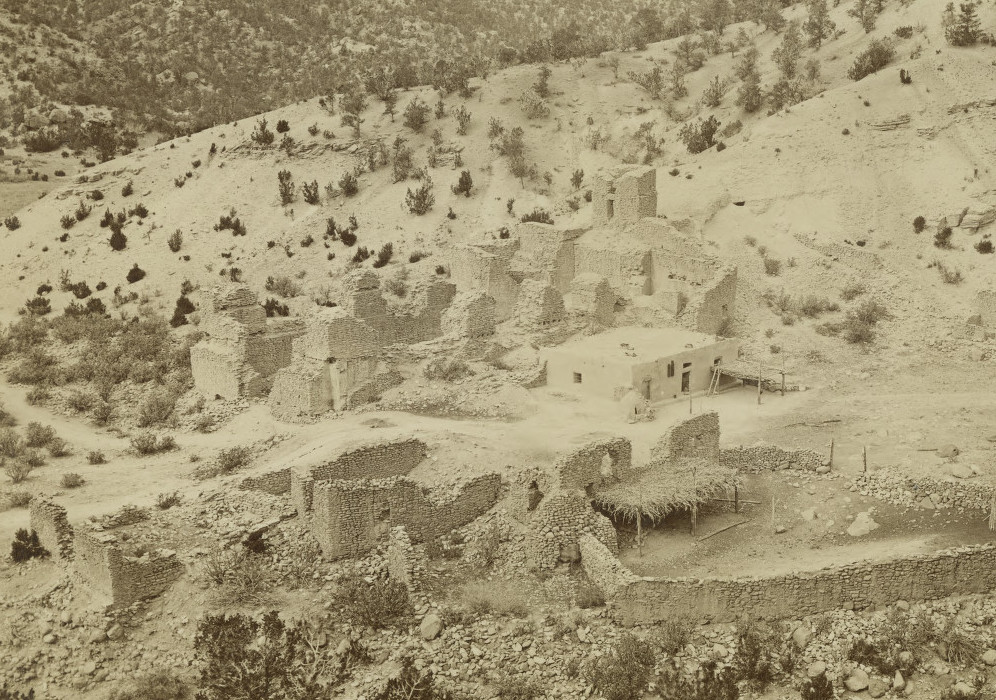
The ruins circa 1877. Photo by John K. Hillers.

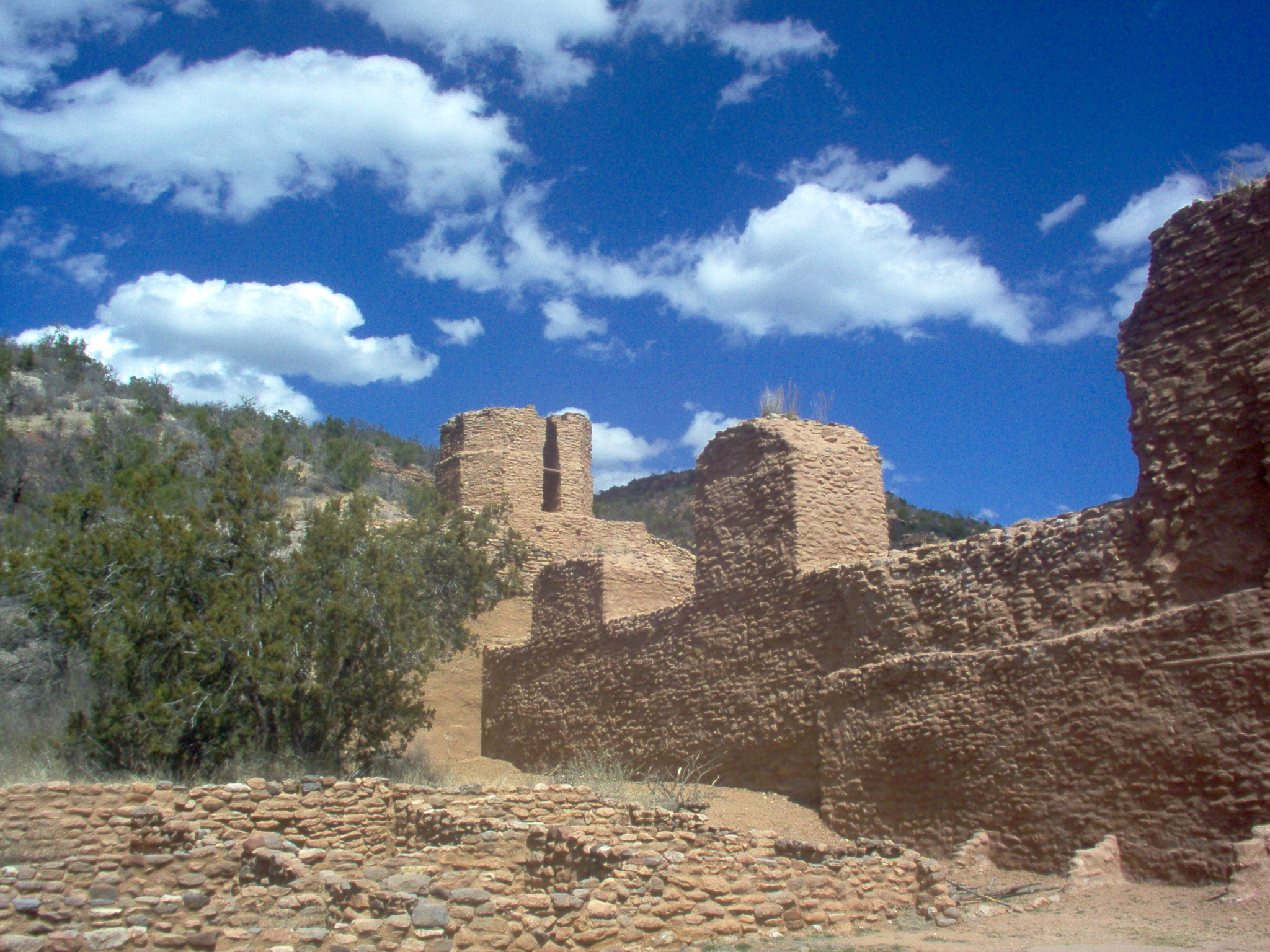
Ruins of Gisewa Pueblo and San José de los Jemez Mission Church.

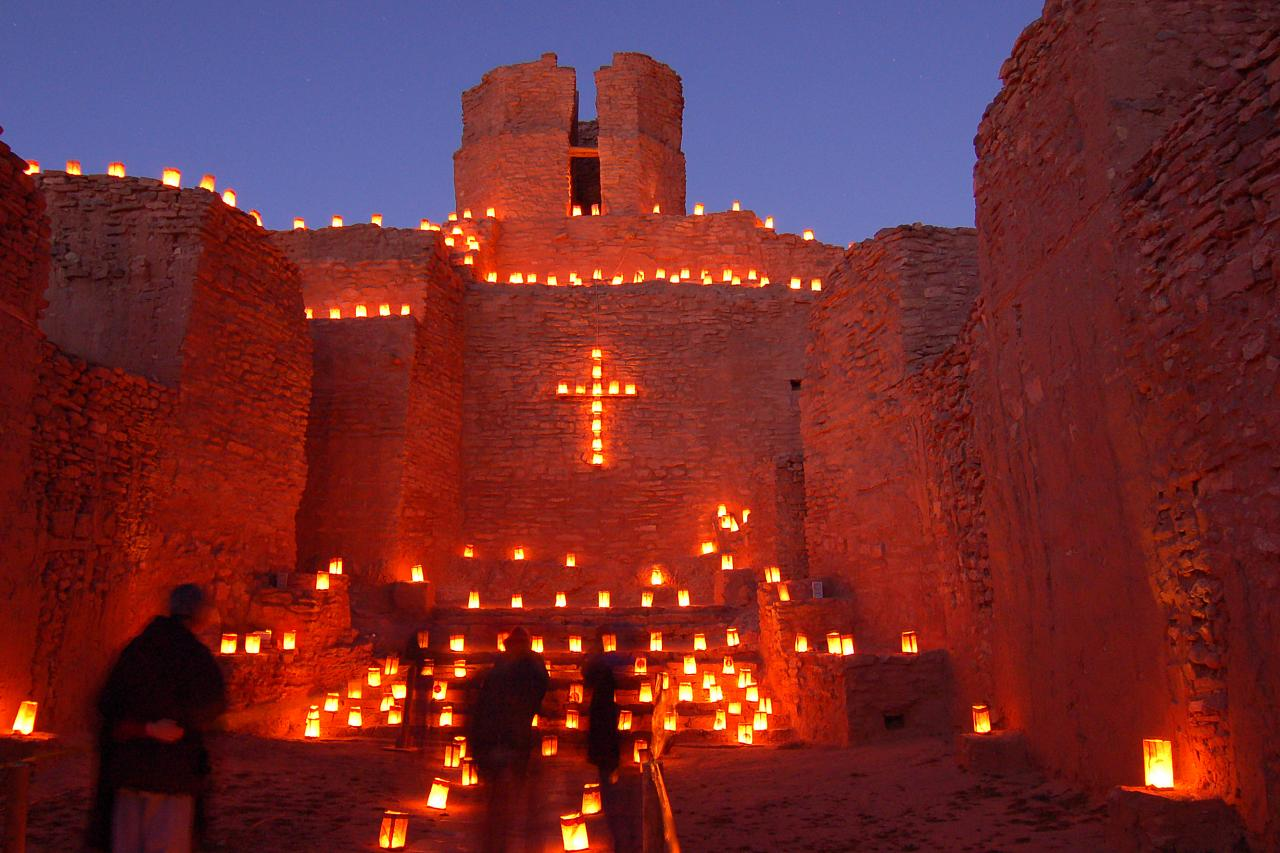
Christmas farolitos at the old church, 2006.

== See also ==
- Puebloan peoples
- National Register of Historic Places listings in Sandoval County, New Mexico
- List of National Historic Landmarks in New Mexico
- Astialakwa
