= Corrales, New Mexico =

- Village
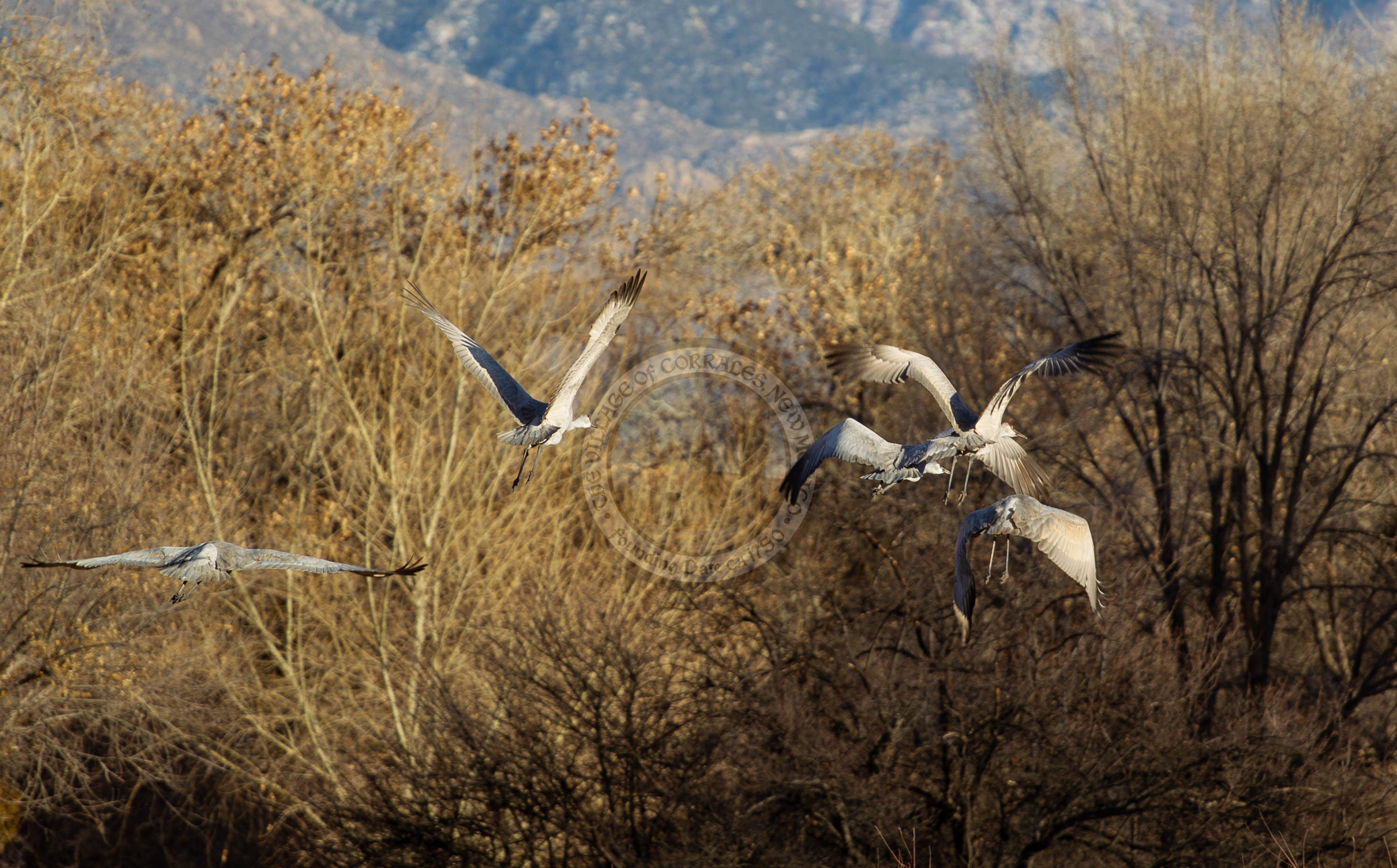
- Village of Corrales

- Location of Corrales, New Mexico

- Location in the United States
- Coordinates: 35°14′16″N 106°37′24″W
- Country: United States
- State: New Mexico
- Counties: Sandoval

Government
  - Mayor: Fred Hashimoto

Area
  - Total: 10.95 sq mi (28.37 km^{2})
  - Land: 10.79 sq mi (27.94 km^{2})
  - Water: 0.17 sq mi (0.43 km^{2})
- Elevation: 5,036 ft (1,535 m)

Population (2020)
  - Total: 8,493
  - Density: 787.2/sq mi (303.93/km^{2})
- Time zone: UTC−7 (Mountain (MST))
  - Summer (DST): UTC−6 (MDT)
- ZIP code: 87048
- Area code: 505
- FIPS code: 35-17960
- GNIS feature ID: 2413544
- Website: corrales-nm.org

Corrales is a village in southern Sandoval County, New Mexico, United States. First farmed by Tiquex Pueblo people, chosen due to its proximity to the Rio Grande, as documented by Hispano farmers of Nuevo México in the late 1500s. Despite being a part of the Albuquerque metropolitan area, the village maintains its rural character, while also being surrounded by the cities of Albuquerque and Rio Rancho. As of the 2020 census, Corrales had a population of 8,493.

The Rio Grande Bosque on the eastern edge of the village provides refuge for native animals and plants, and ancient Pueblo and Hispano acequias continue to be maintained by the United States Department of Agriculture's Natural Resources Conservation Service and the Middle Rio Grande Conservancy District.

== History ==
The village of Corrales (Spanish for "corrals") is located along the Rio Grande and is built on the site of two Indian Pueblos settled before AD 500 by the Tiguex Indians, and which were later occupied by Spanish Colonists and explorers who colonized the region around 1540. The Spanish colonists subsequently built an adobe church on the site called the Church of San Ysidro in 1868, named after the annual fiesta de San Ysidro in May.

In 1710, a grant of the Alameda lands (including Corrales) was given to Corporal Francisco Montes Vigil, a soldier in the Spanish Army. Vigil sold it in 1712 to Captain Juan Gonzáles Bas who was then living in Bernalillo. Gonzáles subsequently sold the land comprising the Village of Corrales in 1718 to Salvador Martinez. Over time, the land comprising the Village of Corrales was parceled off and sold for agricultural development and livestock ranching. The current Village of Corrales government was incorporated and chartered in 1971.

The village was selected as #19 in CNN Money's list of the 100 best places to live in 2007.

== Geography ==
According to the United States Census Bureau, the village has a total area of 11.2 square miles (29 km^{2}), of which 10.7 square miles (28 km^{2}) is land and 0.5 square miles (1.3 km^{2}) (4.71%) is water.

Until 2005, portions of the Village of Corrales were located in both Bernalillo and Sandoval counties. In 2005, a special election annexed the portion of Corrales located in Bernalillo County to Sandoval County, so that now the entire village is located in Sandoval County.

=== Climate ===
Climate data for Corrales, New Mexico, 1991–2020 normals, extremes 1982—
Month	Jan	Feb	Mar	Apr	May	Jun	Jul	Aug	Sep	Oct	Nov	Dec	Year
Record high °F (°C)	69 (21)	77 (25)	85 (29)	89 (32)	102 (39)	109 (43)	106 (41)	101 (38)	99 (37)	95 (35)	79 (26)	70 (21)	109 (43)
Mean maximum °F (°C)	61.7 (16.5)	68.3 (20.2)	77.7 (25.4)	83.7 (28.7)	91.6 (33.1)	99.3 (37.4)	99.4 (37.4)	96.3 (35.7)	92.3 (33.5)	83.8 (28.8)	72.1 (22.3)	61.4 (16.3)	100.8 (38.2)
Mean daily maximum °F (°C)	49.0 (9.4)	55.0 (12.8)	63.5 (17.5)	71.0 (21.7)	80.3 (26.8)	90.5 (32.5)	91.7 (33.2)	89.4 (31.9)	83.0 (28.3)	71.6 (22.0)	58.2 (14.6)	48.1 (8.9)	70.9 (21.6)
Daily mean °F (°C)	34.9 (1.6)	39.7 (4.3)	46.8 (8.2)	53.9 (12.2)	62.6 (17.0)	72.0 (22.2)	76.4 (24.7)	74.6 (23.7)	66.8 (19.3)	54.8 (12.7)	42.8 (6.0)	34.6 (1.4)	55.0 (12.8)
Mean daily minimum °F (°C)	20.9 (−6.2)	24.3 (−4.3)	30.1 (−1.1)	36.7 (2.6)	44.8 (7.1)	53.5 (11.9)	61.1 (16.2)	59.7 (15.4)	50.6 (10.3)	38.1 (3.4)	27.4 (−2.6)	21.0 (−6.1)	39.0 (3.9)
Mean minimum °F (°C)	9.2 (−12.7)	11.4 (−11.4)	18.6 (−7.4)	25.5 (−3.6)	31.9 (−0.1)	41.5 (5.3)	51.3 (10.7)	50.3 (10.2)	38.6 (3.7)	25.4 (−3.7)	14.4 (−9.8)	8.4 (−13.1)	5.2 (−14.9)
Record low °F (°C)	−5 (−21)	−11 (−24)	8 (−13)	16 (−9)	25 (−4)	36 (2)	41 (5)	39 (4)	31 (−1)	13 (−11)	7 (−14)	−6 (−21)	−11 (−24)
Average precipitation inches (mm)	0.55 (14)	0.41 (10)	0.66 (17)	0.48 (12)	0.51 (13)	0.52 (13)	1.40 (36)	1.71 (43)	1.20 (30)	0.96 (24)	0.65 (17)	0.51 (13)	9.56 (242)
Average snowfall inches (cm)	1.7 (4.3)	0.9 (2.3)	0.7 (1.8)	0.1 (0.25)	0.0 (0.0)	0.0 (0.0)	0.0 (0.0)	0.0 (0.0)	0.0 (0.0)	0.6 (1.5)	0.8 (2.0)	2.9 (7.4)	7.7 (19.55)
Average precipitation days (≥ 0.01 in)	3.3	3.1	3.4	2.6	3.4	2.9	7.4	7.9	4.8	4.0	2.7	3.2	48.7
Average snowy days (≥ 0.1 in)	1.2	0.6	0.3	0.1	0.0	0.0	0.0	0.0	0.0	0.2	0.4	1.3	4.1
Source 1: NOAA
Source 2: National Weather Service

== Demographics ==
Historical population
Census	Pop.	Note	%±
1980	2,791		—
1990	5,453		95.4%
2000	7,334		34.5%
2010	8,329		13.6%
2020	8,493		2.0%
U.S. Decennial Census

Corrales is part of the Albuquerque metropolitan area.

Corrales has a rapidly growing Asian population, holding up to 3–4% as of 2022.

=== 2020 census ===
As of the 2020 census, Corrales had a population of 8,493. The median age was 58.3 years. 14.1% of residents were under the age of 18 and 35.7% of residents were 65 years of age or older. For every 100 females there were 91.7 males, and for every 100 females age 18 and over there were 90.4 males age 18 and over.

98.9% of residents lived in urban areas, while 1.1% lived in rural areas.

Racial composition as of the 2020 census
Race	Number	Percent
White	6,272	73.8%
Black or African American	90	1.1%
American Indian and Alaska Native	195	2.3%
Asian	95	1.1%
Native Hawaiian and Other Pacific Islander	4	0.0%
Some other race	449	5.3%
Two or more races	1,388	16.3%
Hispanic or Latino (of any race)	2,227	26.2%

There were 3,647 households in Corrales, of which 20.2% had children under the age of 18 living in them. Of all households, 61.5% were married-couple households, 12.5% were households with a male householder and no spouse or partner present, and 20.6% were households with a female householder and no spouse or partner present. About 22.0% of all households were made up of individuals and 13.3% had someone living alone who was 65 years of age or older.

There were 3,886 housing units, of which 6.2% were vacant. The homeowner vacancy rate was 0.7% and the rental vacancy rate was 6.7%.

=== 2000 census ===
As of the census of 2000, there were 7,334 people, 2,819 households, and 2,122 families residing in the village. The population density was 683.7 inhabitants per square mile (264.0/km^{2}). There were 2,983 housing units at an average density of 278.1 units per square mile (107.4 units/km^{2}). The racial makeup of the village was 86.05% White, 0.57% African American, 1.51% Native American, 0.79% Asian, 0.03% Pacific Islander, 8.22% from other races, and 2.82% from two or more races. Hispanic or Latino of any race were 25.55% of the population.

There were 2,819 households, out of which 32.5% had children under the age of 18 living with them, 65.4% were married couples living together, 7.1% had a female householder with no husband present, and 24.7% were non-families. 18.1% of all households were made up of individuals, and 4.7% had someone living alone who was 65 years of age or older. The average household size was 2.60 and the average family size was 2.97.

In the village, the population was spread out, with 24.6% under the age of 18, 4.8% from 18 to 24, 25.9% from 25 to 44, 34.2% from 45 to 64, and 10.5% who were 65 years of age or older. The median age was 42 years. For every 100 females, there were 93.5 males. For every 100 females age 18 and over, there were 90.2 males.

The median income for a household in the village was $67,217, and the median income for a family was $79,331. Males had a median income of $52,397 versus $34,091 for females. The per capita income for the village was $33,629. About 3.1% of families and 5.0% of the population were below the poverty line, including 7.8% of those under age 18 and 1.8% of those age 65 or over.

== Village infrastructure ==
Unlike the surrounding communities of Rio Rancho and Albuquerque, much of the Village of Corrales does not have a centralized water system for running water or a municipal sewage system, which requires many homes and businesses to each install their own wells and water pumping systems and leach fields for sewage disposal. Newer homes built in Corrales are no longer allowed to install leach fields and are required to use closed septic systems with a holding tank which must be pumped regularly by sewage trucks at the homeowner's expense. The Village has an extensive system of canals which transport water from the Rio Grande to crop fields and pasturage for crop irrigation and livestock.

== Biology ==
The Village is heavily wooded with large stands of cottonwood and other native trees. Russian olive trees grow throughout the area and are an invasive species. Corrales is divided in a lower riparian habitat and a drier, sandy shrubland uphill on the west side of the Rio Grande.

There is a wide variety of animals that use Corrales and the surrounding ecosystems. The most popular with visitors is fish for fishing activities, and birds for wildlife viewing.

== Education ==
It is within Albuquerque Public Schools. Corrales Elementary School is in Corrales.

There is a PK-8 Christian private school, Sandia View Christian School. It is affiliated with the Corrales Seventh-day Adventist Church.

Corrales has its own public library, Corrales Community Library.

== Notable people ==
- Fred Harris, retired United States Senator from Oklahoma
- Timothy Kraft, political consultant and campaign manager
- Brenda McKenna, member of the New Mexico Senate
- Jace Norman, actor
- Stephen R. Donaldson, fantasy writer
