= Astialakwa =

Former village of the ancestral Puebloan people

Astialakwa Astialakwa Archeological District
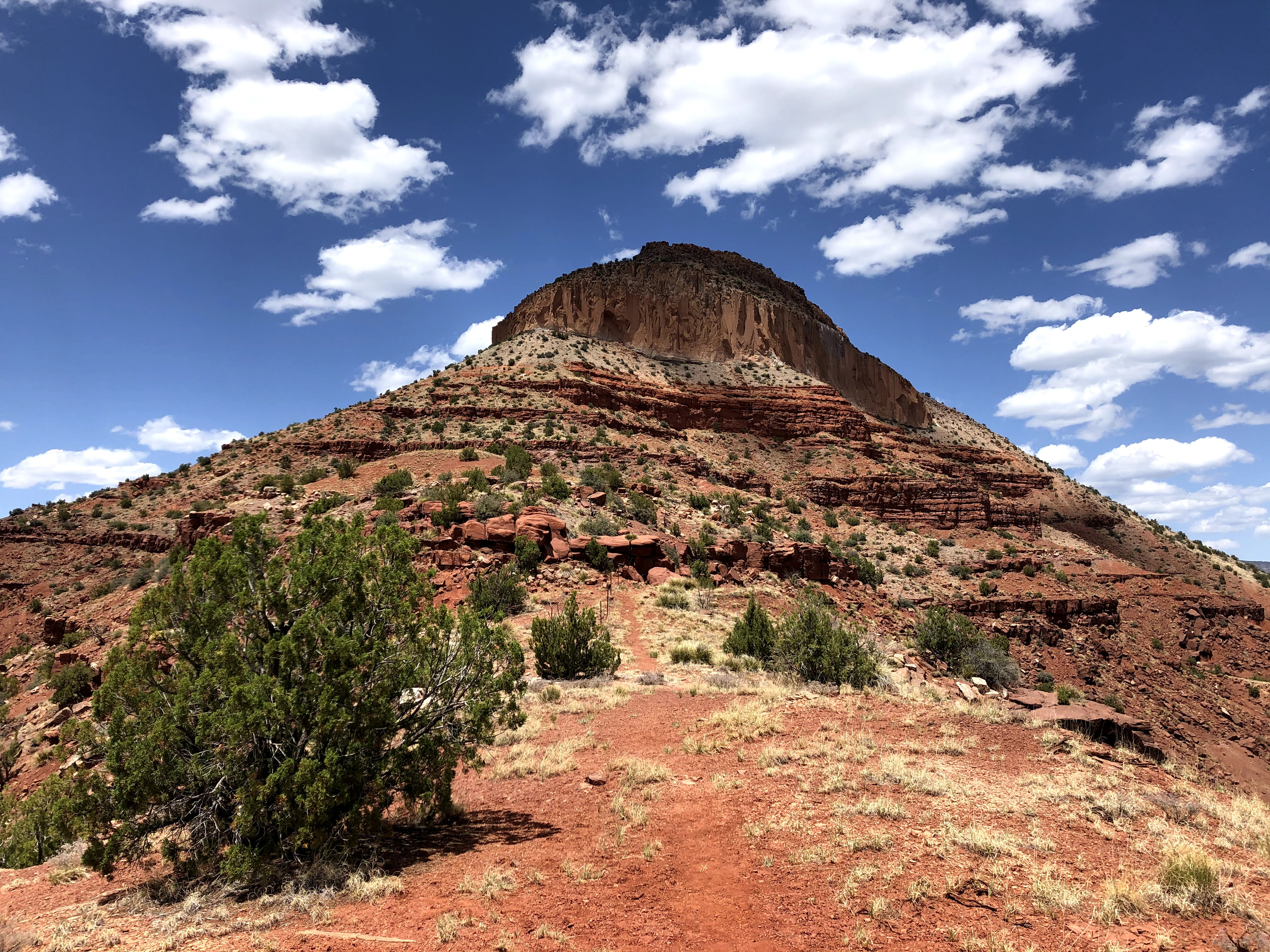
- The Fortress of Astialakwa, near Jemez Pueblo.
- Interactive map of Astialakwa; Astialakwa Archeological District
- 35°41′36″N 106°44′29″W
- Type: Prehistoric/historic aboriginal
- Location: Santa Fe National Forest
- Nearest city: Jemez Springs, Sandoval County, New Mexico, USA

History
- Built: prior to 1500 AD
- Built for: habitation, agriculture, fortification, refuge
- Demolished: 1694

Site notes
- Elevation: 6,975 ft (2,126 m)
- Architect: Ancestral Puebloans
- Architectural style: Linear plaza ladder-type construction

Astialakwa was a prehistoric and historic village built by the ancestral Puebloan people located within the Astialakwa Archeological District (FS-360, LA-1825), in an area now known as the Jemez Springs area of Northern New Mexico. The archeological area is on the National Register of Historic Places (ID# 84003010). The location is restricted from access.

== Description ==
Astialakwa was a fortified pueblo village near Jemez Pueblo in the area that is now New Mexico. The village was built at the top of a nearly inaccessible ridge on an 800-foot high detached mesa (peñol), overlooking the Jemez River. The people who lived in these villages spoke the Towa language, a Tanoan language. Astialaka shares architectural similarities with the former pueblos of Patokwa and Boletsakwa which were centered on two large linear plazas surrounded by multiple rooms built in the characteristic "ladder-type" construction. Astialakwa differed in that there were no kivas, and the one-story walls were built of unhewn tuff blocks. The complex architectural remains indicate that this was a habitation as well as a refuge pueblo, containing many rooms, petroglyphs and other rock art, defensive walls, and agricultural areas. The periods of significance were 1500-1599 and between 1600 and 1649.

== History ==
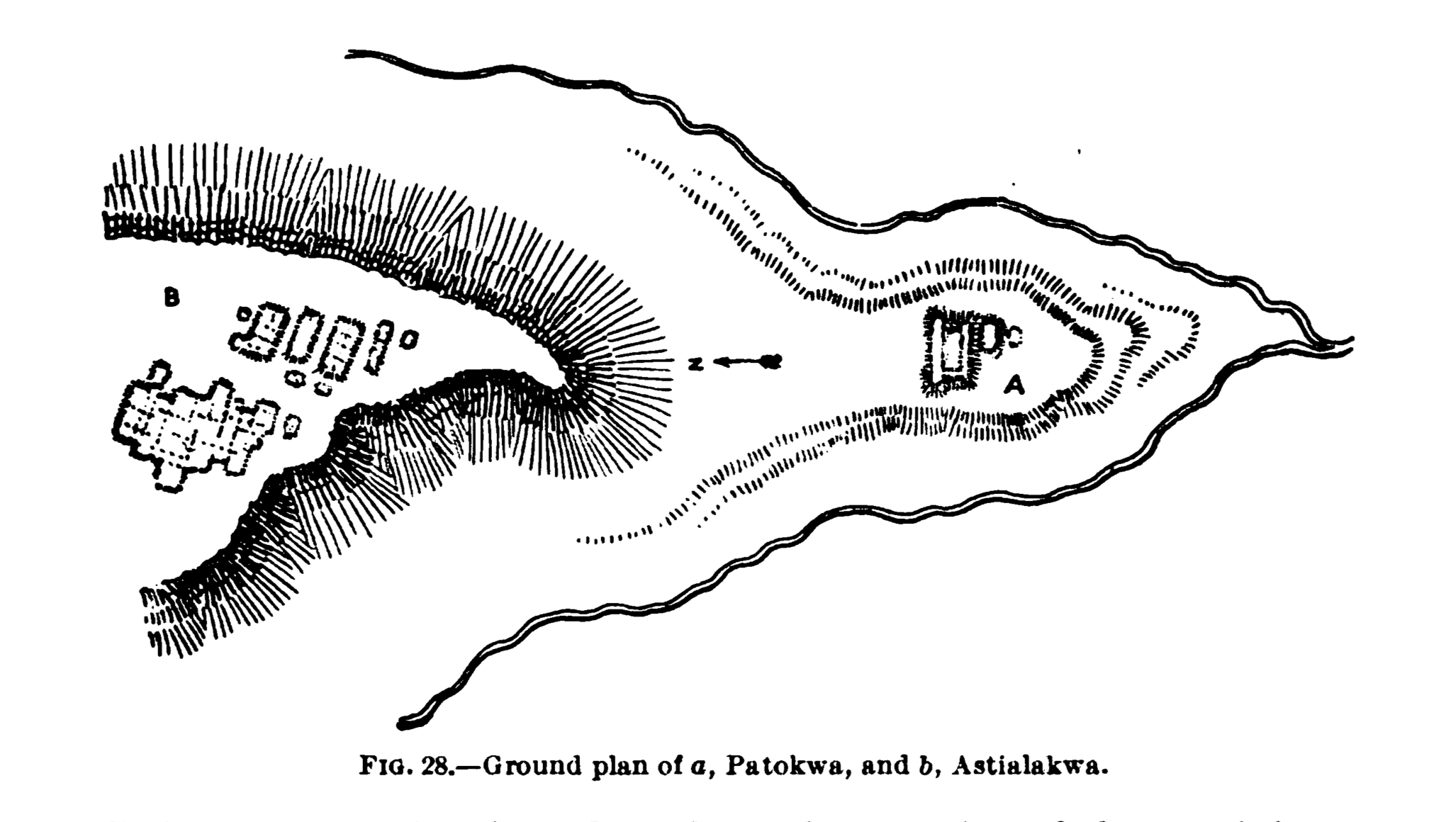
Ground plan of Astialakwa pueblo (area b. in drawing) by Hewitt (1906)

Historically, the Jemez people lived in seven or more pueblos before the conquest of Santa Fe de Nuevo Méjico in 1598 by Juan Oñate and his men. The Spaniards built missions and forced the Jemez people to abandon their historic homes and move to three settlements with missions: Astialakwa, Gyusiwa, and Patoqua (Patokwa). In 1692, don Diego de Vargas reconquered Nuevo Mexico and in 1694 stormed the fortress of Astialakwa in a siege.

== Battle of Astialakwa ==
The Battle of Astialakwa (also known as the Siege of Astialakwa) took place on July 24, 1694, when a group of 120 soldiers led by the Spanish governor don Diego de Vargas and their Keresan-speaking allied militia from the Zia, Santa Ana and San Felipe pueblos, waged war against the Jemez Pueblo indigenous peoples. Eighty-four Jemez people died in the battle, while 81 people escaped. Over three hundred and sixty Native women and children were taken prisoner by the Spanish soldiers. Seven people leapt to their death instead of being captured. After the battle, Vargas ordered the village to be "burned and reduced to ashes" after giving the sheep, goats, cattle and maize to his Keres allies. Some who escaped were taken in by the Diné peoples to the west.

The battle was in part retaliation for the Pueblo Revolt, when over 30 Pueblo villages made up of peoples speaking six languages banded together in a unified uprising against the Spanish colonialist forces; culminating in the death of 401 Spanish on August 10, 1680.

Descendants of the survivors of Astialakwa continue to dwell and share their culture at Jemez Pueblo not far from Guadalupe Mesa.

== Gallery ==
Astialakwa Archeological District is located near Jemez Pueblo, NM, USA. Access to the site is restricted.

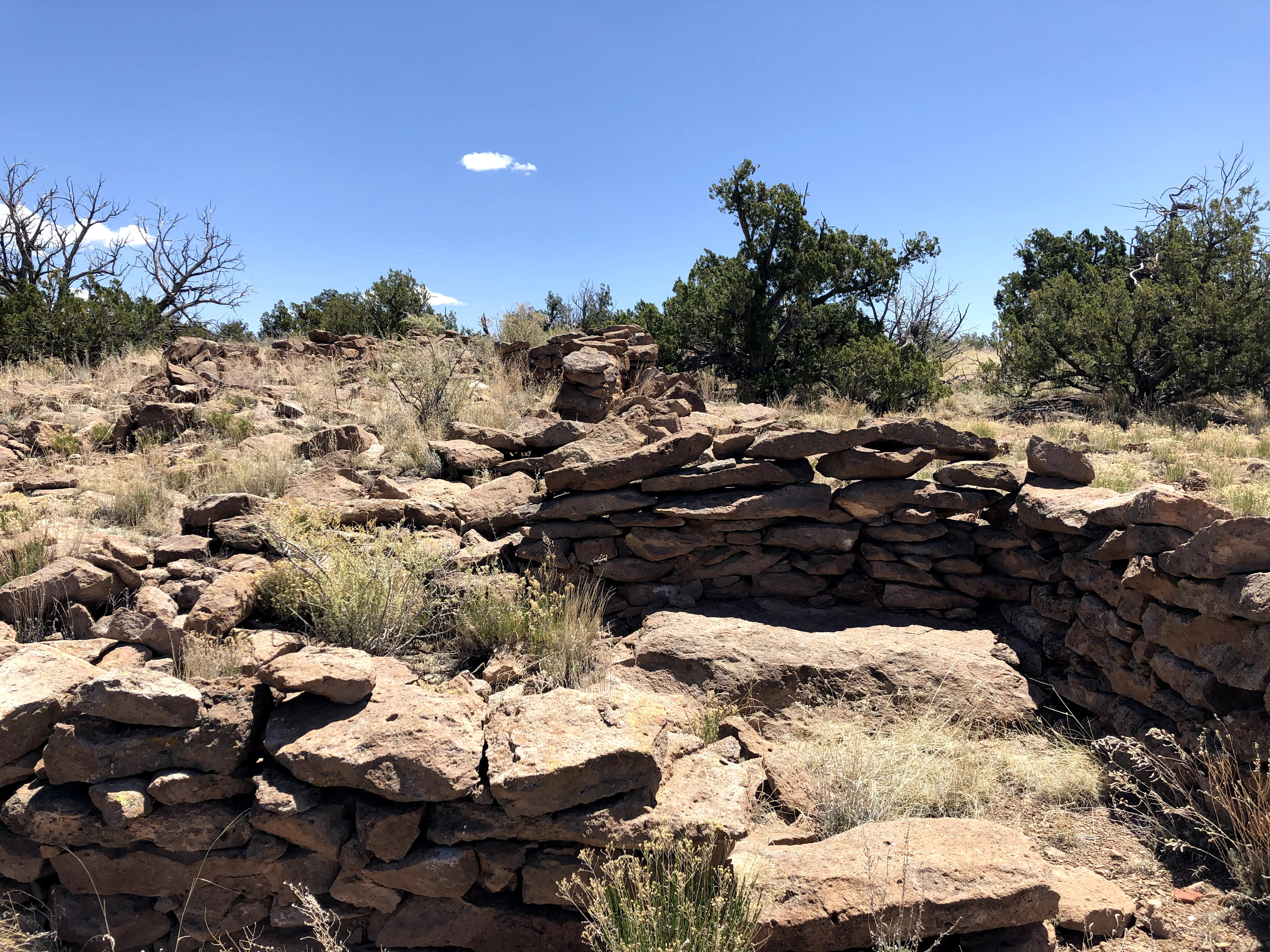

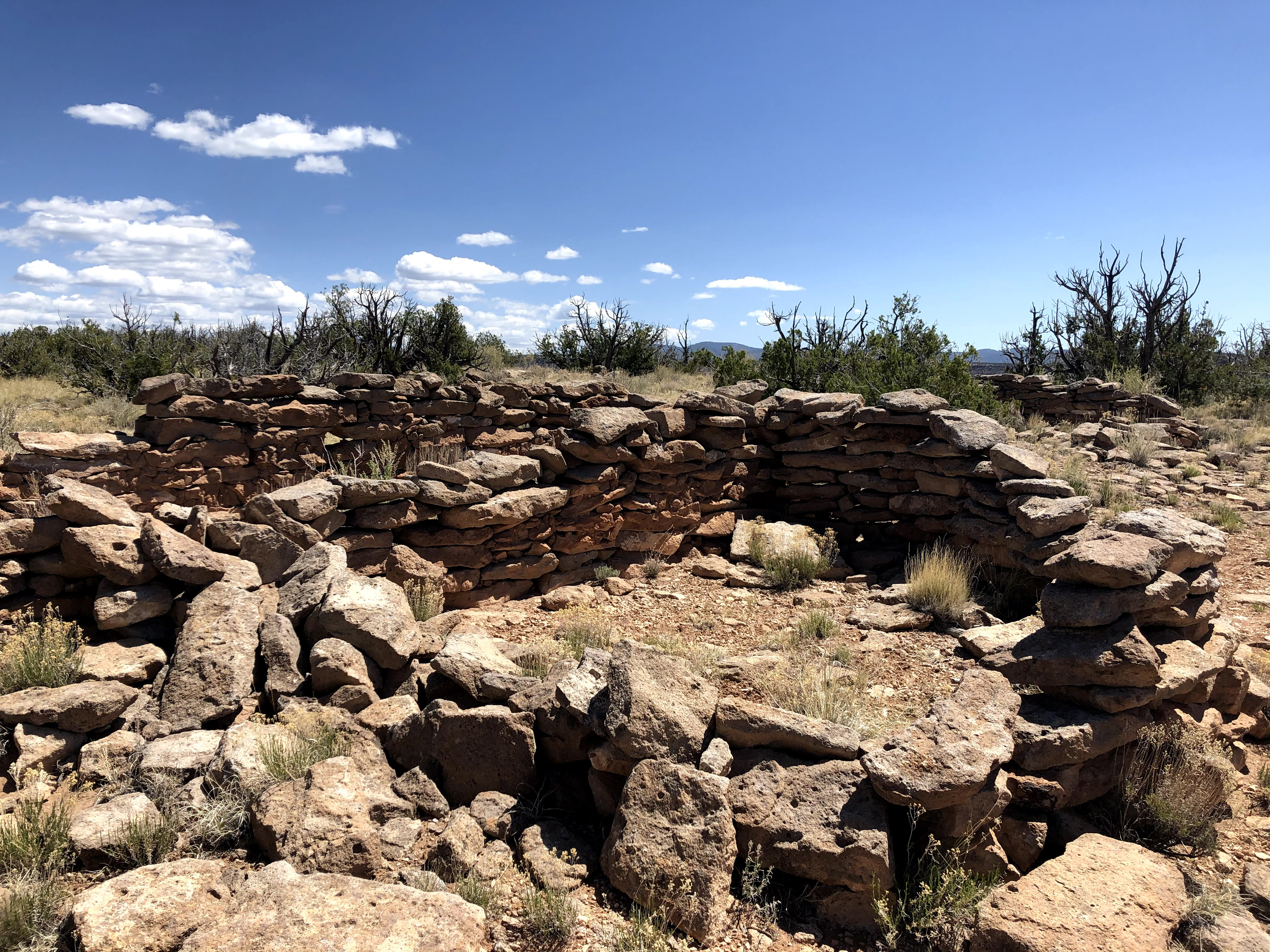

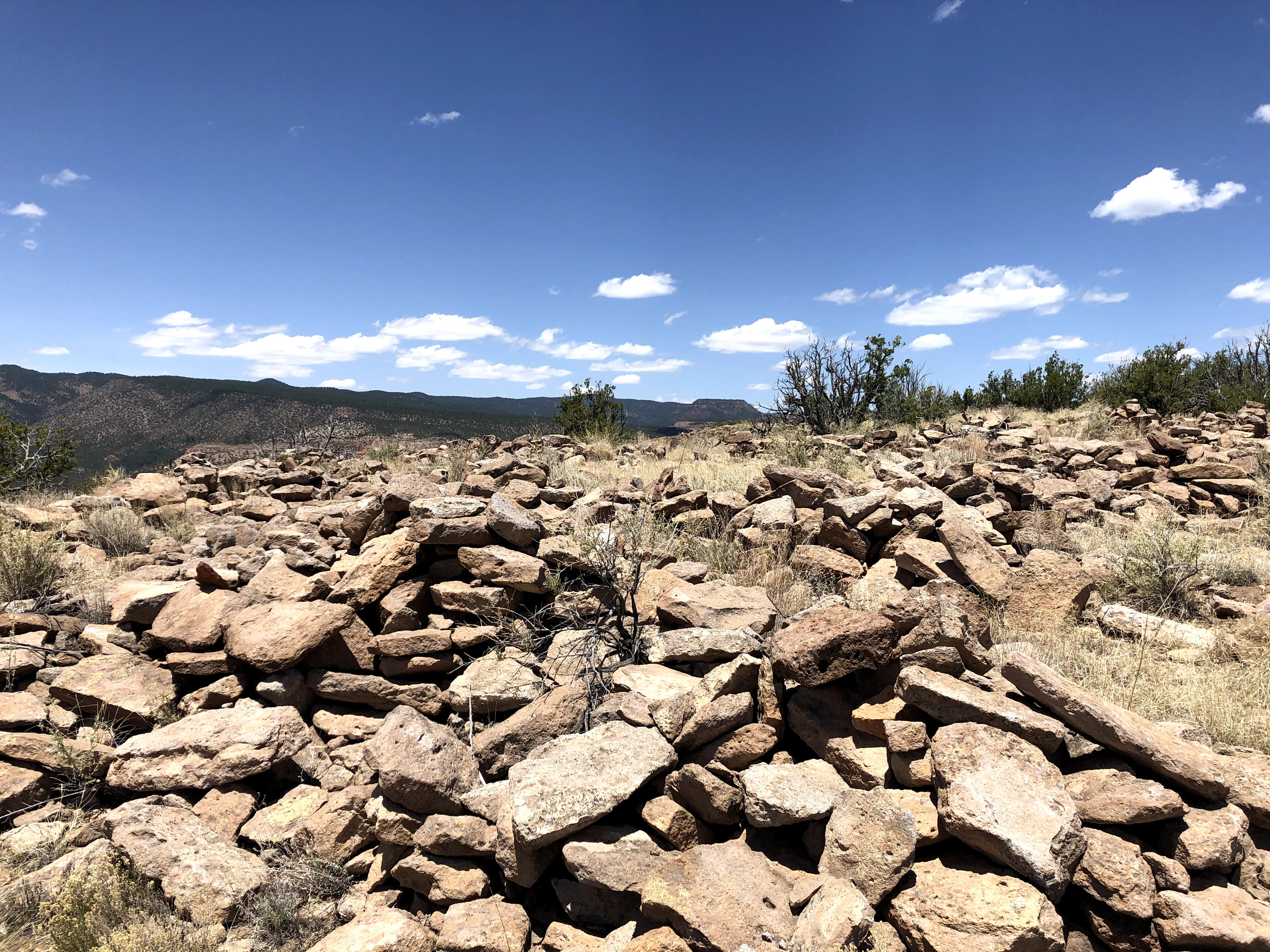

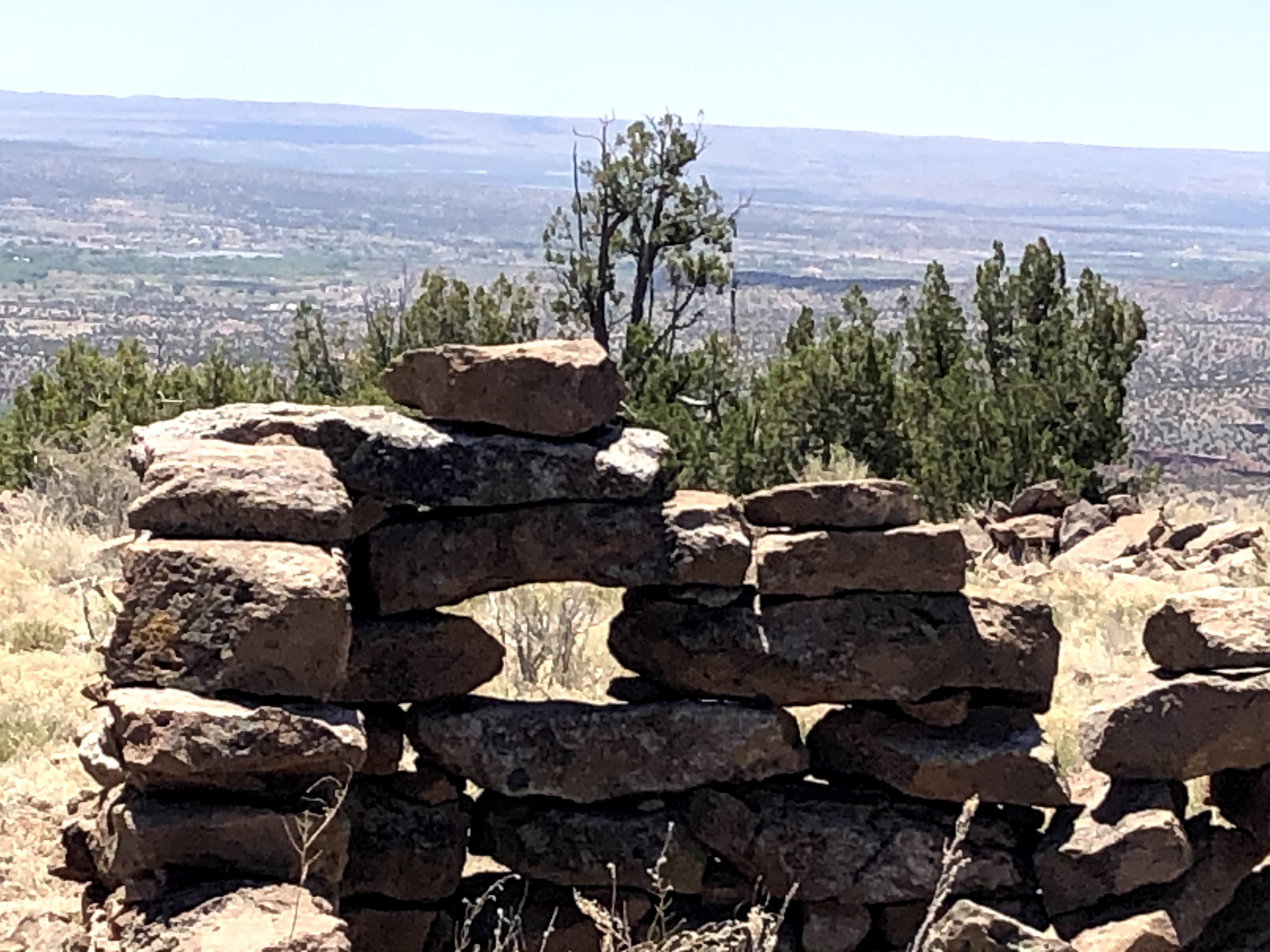

== See also ==
- Ancestral Puebloan dwellings
- Pueblo
- Ancestral Pueblo people
- Tanoan languages
