= Big Bead Mesa =

- U.S. National Register of Historic Places
- U.S. National Historic Landmark
- Location within New Mexico Location within the United States
- Nearest city: Grants, New Mexico
- Coordinates: 35°29′39″N 107°12′58″W
- Area: 160 acres (65 ha)
- Built: 1700
- NRHP reference No.: 66000958

Significant dates
- Added to NRHP: October 15, 1966
- Designated NHL: July 19, 1964

Big Bead Mesa (Navajo: Yooʼtsoh) is a historic Navajo habitation site near Grants, New Mexico, within Cibola National Forest. Occupied from the mid-18th to early 19th century, the site gives an important window into the relations between the Navajo and the Puebloans of that time. First explored archaeologically in 1939, it was declared a National Historic Landmark in 1964.

== Description ==
The Big Bead Mesa site is located in a remote area between Grants, New Mexico and the Jemez Pueblo northwest of Albuquerque. The main areas of the site are located along the northeastern edge of a large mesa, which extends northeast from Grants and includes Mount Taylor. The name of the site is derived from fossilized beads found at the base of the mesa in significant numbers by the local Navajo.

The site consists of a large fortified village, with about 90 hogan sites identified. It extends along two tongues of the mesa, split by a wide complex of arroyo ravines. The hogans are clustered in small groups, each of which is accompanied by secondary structures such as sweat lodges, food cache areas, and fortifications. In two places there are open formations that are interpreted as dance grounds used for ceremonial purposes. Fortifications include an extensive wall that nearly cuts off one portion of the settlement. Access to the area below the mesa rim was possible, but likely required the use of ladders.

The site was occupied by the Navajo from about 1745 to 1812. At the time, they were allied to the Apache, and the site presented a threatening posture to the nearby Jemez and Acoma Puebloan settlements. The site is an important window into the movements of the Navajo and their relationships to the surrounding tribes.

== See also ==
- National Register of Historic Places listings in Sandoval County, New Mexico
- List of National Historic Landmarks in New Mexico
