= Budaghers, New Mexico =

Coordinates: 35°27′30″N 106°20′00″W

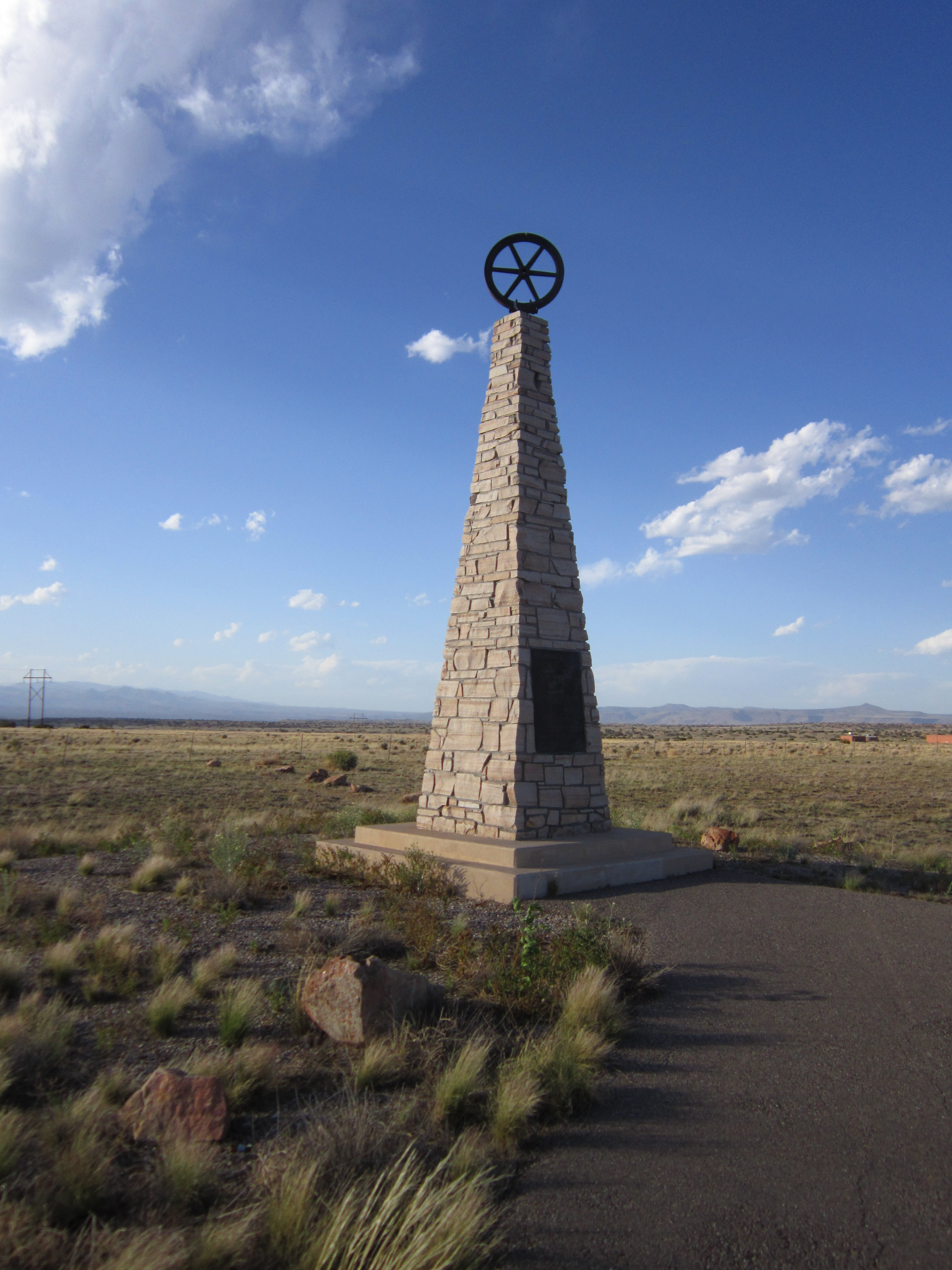
Mormon Battalion Monument

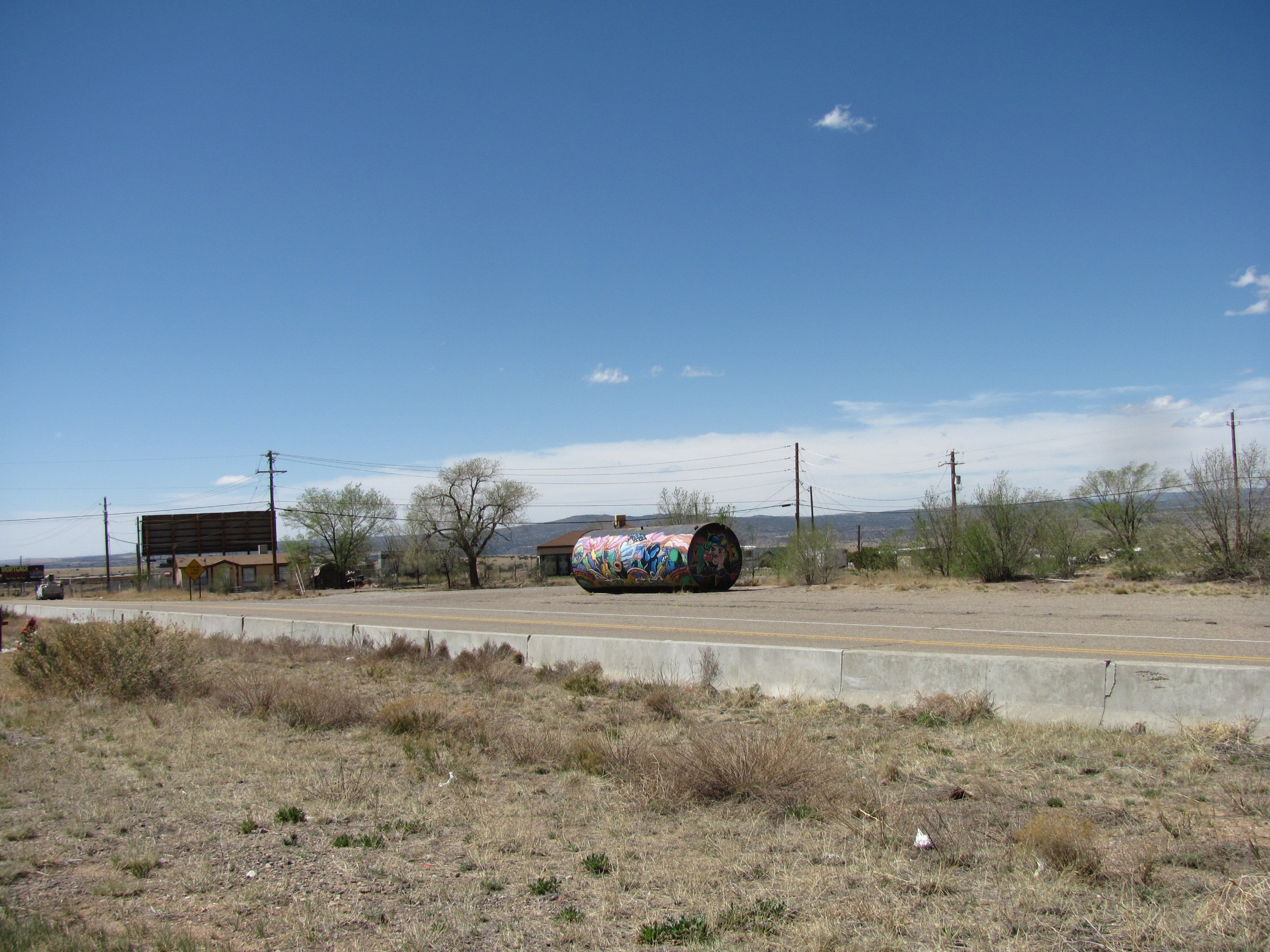
Decorated tank

Budaghers is a former trading post in Sandoval County, New Mexico, United States, located on Interstate 25 halfway between Albuquerque and Santa Fe.

== History ==
Budaghers was a thriving trading post in the 1950s that was started by Joseph and Sally Budagher, who personally knew and traded with the Pueblo Indians in that area. Joseph M. Budagher came to New Mexico from Lebanon and started a business in the area. Before Interstate 25 was built, shoppers pulled off the road and filled up with gas or bought Indian rugs, jewelry, pottery and much more. The bar was attached and only a small part of it.

After the freeway came, the New Mexico Outlet Center mall was built in 1993 and closed in 1997. The mall was redeveloped by Jim Long in 2000 as ¡Traditions!, featuring New Mexico products and a cultural center, but it stands empty today.

At the south end of the West Frontage Road in Budaghers stands the Mormon Battalion Monument. It is a rock pillar with a wagon wheel at the top and with an information plaque on the east side. Also in Budaghers is a brightly painted cylindrical metal tank that changes subject from time to time.
