= Bernalillo, New Mexico =

- Town
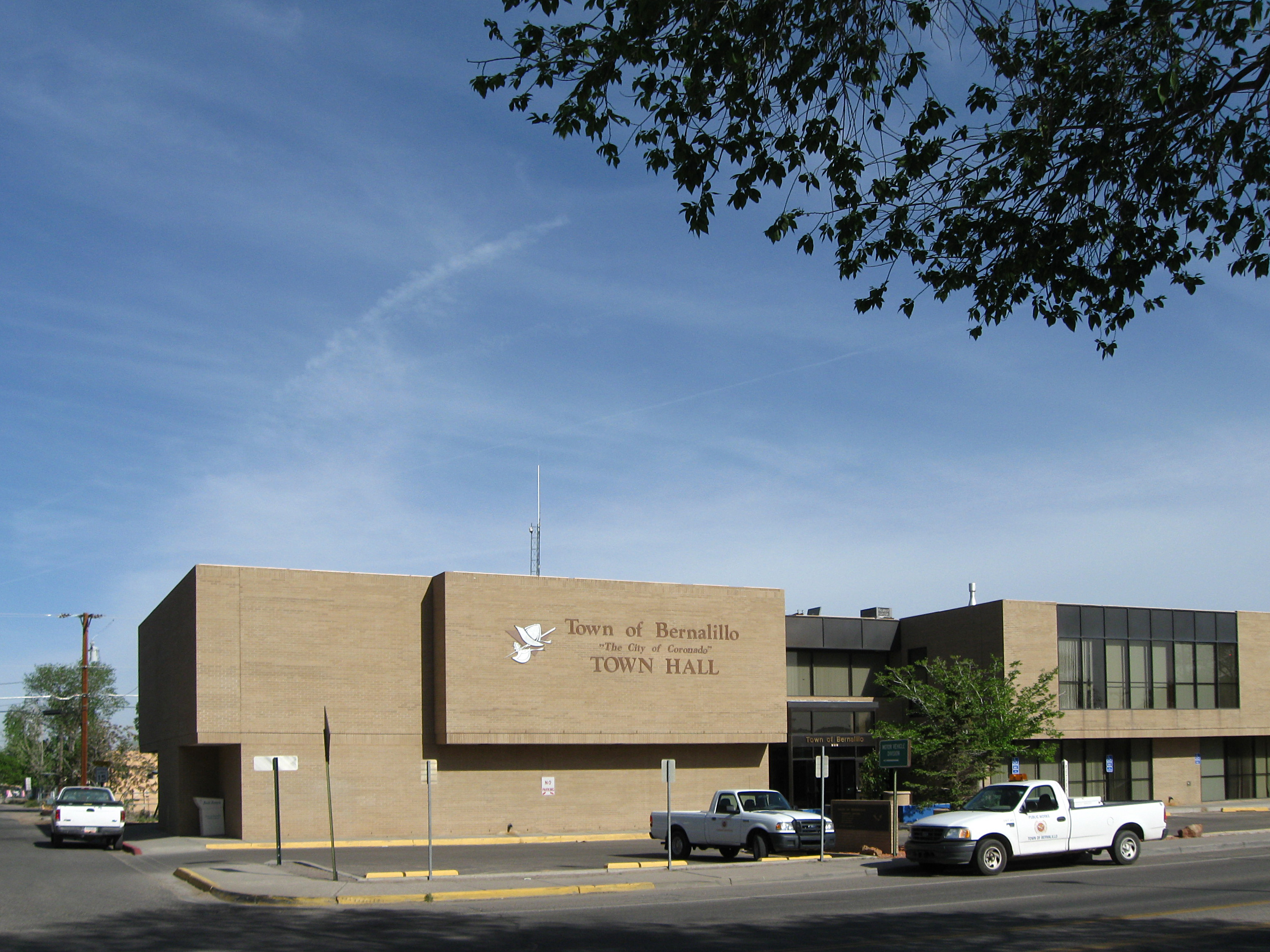
- Bernalillo Town Hall, May 2009

- Location of Bernalillo, New Mexico

- Location in the United States
- Coordinates: 35°18′50″N 106°33′08″W
- Country: United States
- State: New Mexico
- County: Sandoval
- Founded: 1695

Government
  - Mayor: Jack Torres

Area
  - Total: 5.296 sq mi (13.717 km^{2})
  - Land: 5.258 sq mi (13.619 km^{2})
  - Water: 0.038 sq mi (0.099 km^{2})
- Elevation: 5,050 ft (1,540 m)

Population (2020)
  - Total: 8,977
  - Estimate (2023): 9,114
  - Density: 1,733/sq mi (669.2/km^{2})
- Time zone: UTC−07:00 (MST)
  - Summer (DST): UTC−06:00 (MDT)
- ZIP Code: 87004
- Area code: 505
- FIPS code: 35-06970
- GNIS feature ID: 2411678
- Sales tax: 6.94%
- Website: tobnm.gov

Bernalillo (/ˌbɜːrnəˈliːjoʊ/) is a town in and the county seat of Sandoval County, New Mexico, United States. The population was 8,977 at the 2020 census.

Bernalillo is part of the Albuquerque metropolitan area.

== History ==
Bernalillo is one of the oldest European-founded communities in New Mexico. The area had been occupied for centuries by indigenous Pueblo peoples before Spanish resettlement in the late 17th century. Following the Spanish reconquest of New Mexico, Governor Diego de Vargas founded the settlement of Bernalillo in 1695, and the community developed along the Rio Grande as part of the colonial corridor associated with El Camino Real de Tierra Adentro. Bernalillo later grew from a series of riverfront haciendas into a regional trading center linking nearby Pueblo communities and Hispanic settlers.

During the territorial and statehood eras, Bernalillo remained an important administrative and commercial center in north-central New Mexico. Sandoval County was created from the northern portion of Bernalillo County in 1903, and Bernalillo became the county seat. The town's historic Camino del Pueblo reflects Bernalillo's longstanding role as a transportation and trade corridor in the Rio Grande Valley.

The town's historic main street, Camino del Pueblo, also formed part of several major transportation routes over time, including El Camino Real, U.S. Route 66, and New Mexico's early highway system, reflecting Bernalillo's long-standing role as a crossroads community. Anton Docher, who became known as "The Padre of Isleta", first served as a priest in Bernalillo after coming as a missionary to the United States from France. He later served for decades in Isleta.

=== Wine Festival ===
In the 1620s, the wine grape was introduced to Bernalillo by the Catholic priests and Spaniards. The wine industry grew rapidly since. Families were making their own wine and the vineyards were flourishing. The market dipped due to drought and floods. Slowly over time, the wine industry came back into Bernalillo and has sustained its health today, becoming a tradition and staple within the town itself.

The town has embraced its wine heritage and hosts the New Mexico Wine festival yearly during each Labor Day. The event brings in people from all of New Mexico as well as tourists. The event has served as an economic development project for the area as well.

== Geography ==
Bernalillo lies in the Rio Grande Valley of the Albuquerque Basin on the east bank of the Rio Grande. According to the United States Census Bureau, the city has a total area of 5.296 square miles (13.72 km^{2}), of which 5.258 square miles (13.62 km^{2}) is land and 0.038 square miles (0.10 km^{2}), or 2.34% is water

== Demographics ==
Historical population
Census	Pop.	Note	%±
1880	1,223		—
1950	1,922		—
1960	2,574		33.9%
1970	2,016		−21.7%
1980	2,988		48.2%
1990	5,960		99.5%
2000	6,611		10.9%
2010	8,320		25.9%
2020	8,977		7.9%
2023 (est.)	9,114	▲	1.5%
U.S. Decennial Census; 2020 Census

=== 2020 census ===
As of the 2020 census, there were 8,977 people, 3,563 households, and 2,367 families residing in the town. The population density was 1,837.7 inhabitants per square mile (709.5/km^{2}). The median age was 45.7 years. 20.1% of residents were under the age of 18, 3.6% were under 5 years of age, and 25.0% were 65 years of age or older.

For every 100 females there were 93.0 males, and for every 100 females age 18 and over there were 90.5 males age 18 and over. 99.5% of residents lived in urban areas, while 0.5% lived in rural areas.

There were 3,801 housing units, of which 6.3% were vacant. The homeowner vacancy rate was 0.8% and the rental vacancy rate was 7.2%.

There were 3,563 households in Bernalillo, of which 27.8% had children under the age of 18 living in them. Of all households, 45.0% were married-couple households, 17.3% were households with a male householder and no spouse or partner present, and 30.1% were households with a female householder and no spouse or partner present. About 27.6% of all households were made up of individuals and 15.4% had someone living alone who was 65 years of age or older.

Racial composition as of the 2020 census
Race	Number	Percent
White	3,964	44.2%
Black or African American	67	0.7%
American Indian and Alaska Native	594	6.6%
Asian	72	0.8%
Native Hawaiian and Other Pacific Islander	6	0.1%
Some other race	2,201	24.5%
Two or more races	2,073	23.1%
Hispanic or Latino (of any race)	5,730	63.8%

=== 2000 census ===
As of the 2000 census, there were 6,611 people, 2,309 households, and 1,724 families residing in the town. The population density was 1,436.9 inhabitants per square mile (554.8/km^{2}). There were 2,473 housing units at an average density of 537.5 per square mile (207.5/km^{2}). The racial makeup of the town was 60.17% White, 0.74% African American, 3.92% Native American, 0.20% Asian, 31.34% from other races, and 3.63% from two or more races. Hispanic or Latino of any race were 74.75% of the population. Most of these are descendants of colonial Spanish and Mexican settlers in the area from the 16th through the 19th century.

There were 2,309 households, out of which 40.8% had children under the age of 18 living with them, 49.1% were married couples living together, 18.6% had a female householder with no husband present, and 25.3% were non-families. 20.2% of all households were made up of individuals, and 6.9% had someone living alone who was 65 years of age or older. The average household size was 2.86 and the average family size was 3.30.

In the town, the population was spread out, with 31.0% under the age of 18, 9.9% from 18 to 24, 28.5% from 25 to 44, 21.4% from 45 to 64, and 9.2% who were 65 years of age or older. The median age was 32 years. For every 100 females, there were 93.9 males. For every 100 females age 18 and over, there were 91.4 males.

The median income for a household in the town was $30,864, and the median income for a family was $36,286. Males had a median income of $27,417 versus $22,125 for females. The per capita income for the town was $13,100. About 13.9% of families and 18.2% of the population were below the poverty line, including 25.4% of those under age 18 and 16.3% of those age 65 or over.

== Education ==
Most of Bernalillo is in the Bernalillo Public Schools district. Some is in the Jemez Valley Public Schools district. The former operates Bernalillo High School.

== In popular culture ==
- Bernalillo is mentioned several times in Willa Cather's 1927 novel Death Comes for the Archbishop.
- Sam Shepard's play The Late Henry Moss is set "on the outskirts of" Bernalillo.
- Bernalillo Courthouse is the setting for the marriage between Jimmy "Saul Goodman" McGill and Kim Wexler in the New Mexico-set TV series Better Call Saul.
- Bernalillo is mentioned and is the scene of part of the action in Ben Sanders book American Blood (2015).

== Gallery ==
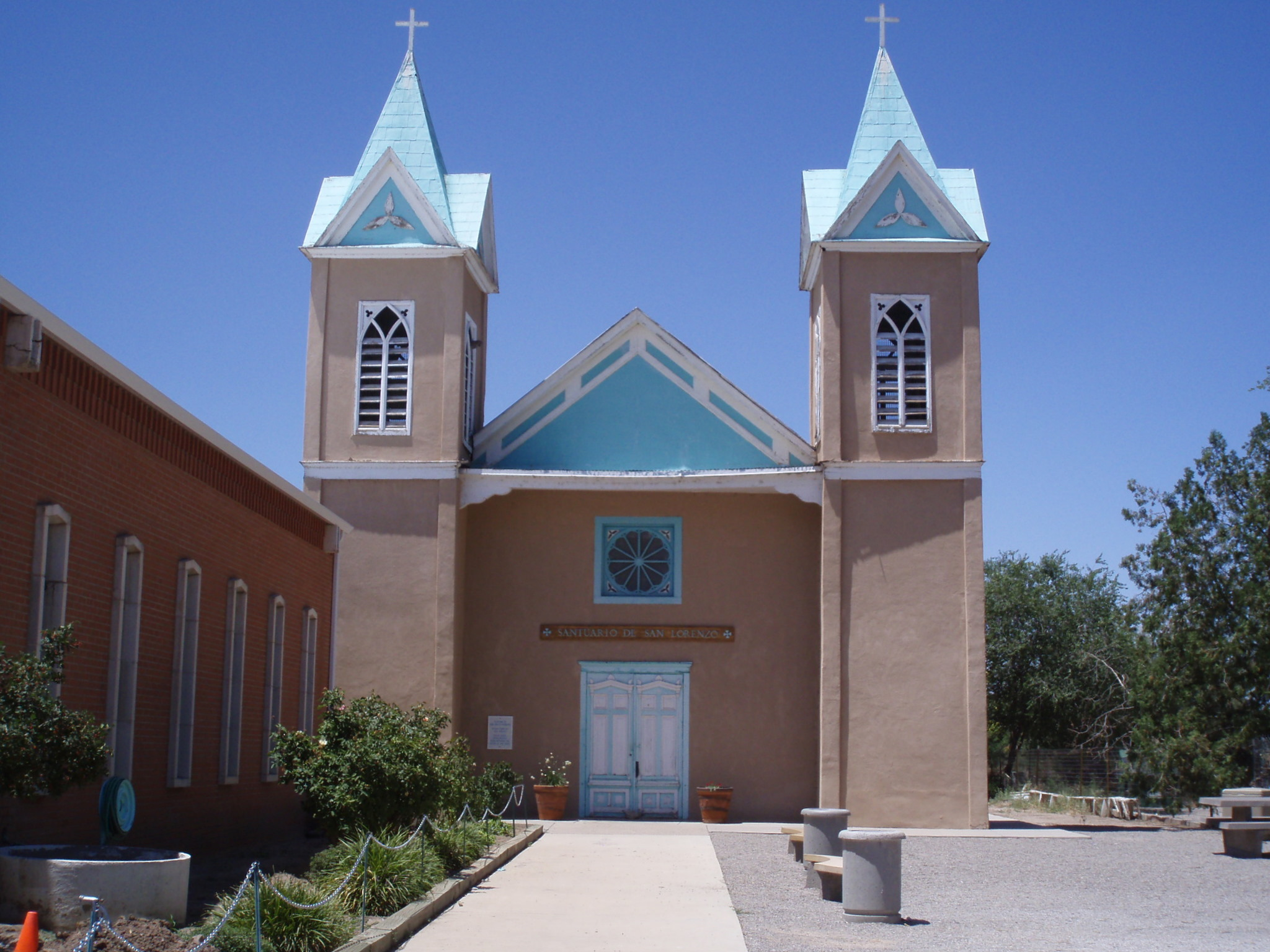
Historic Santuario de San Lorenzo, Bernalillo

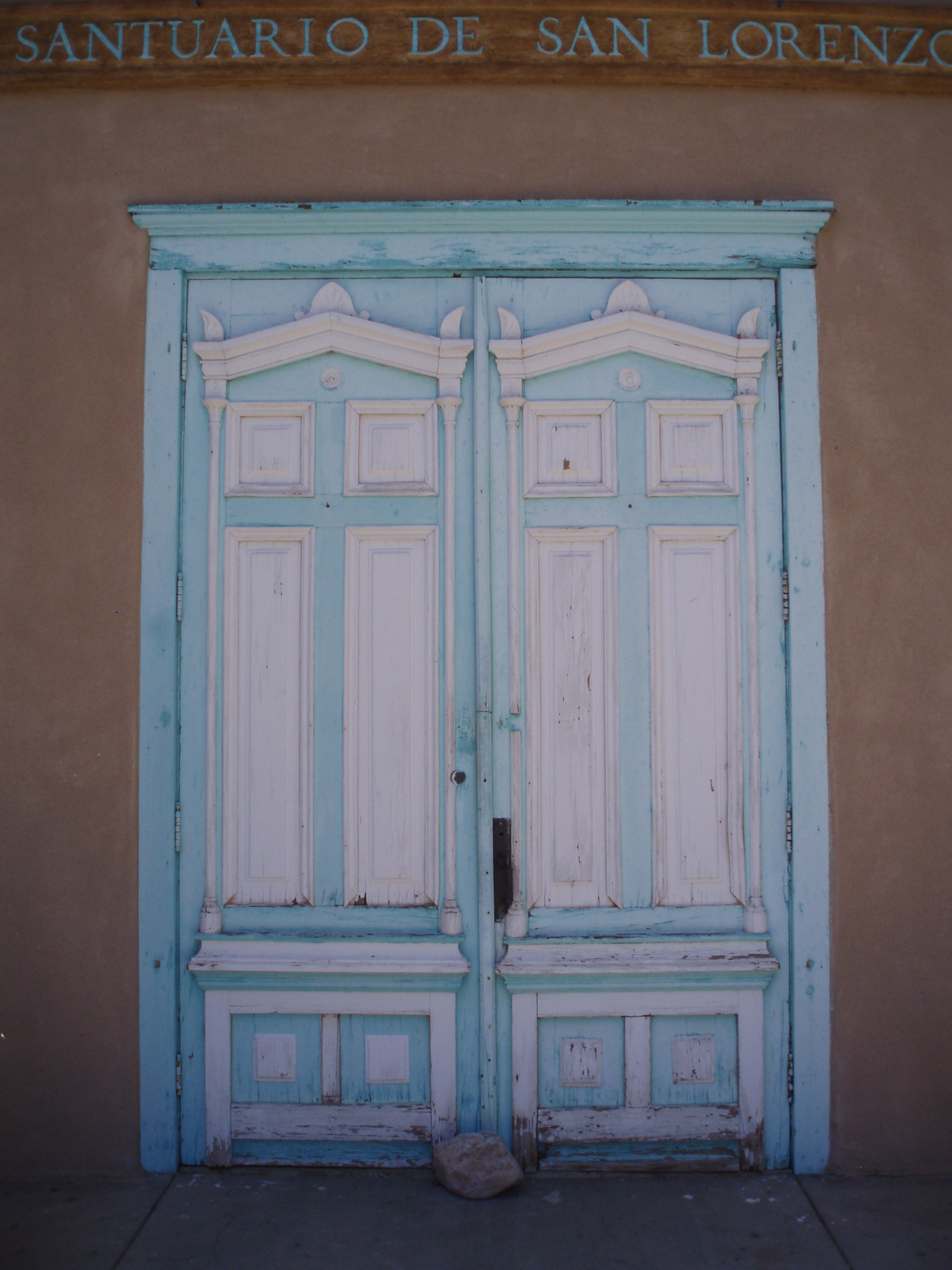
Entrance, Santuario de San Lorenzo

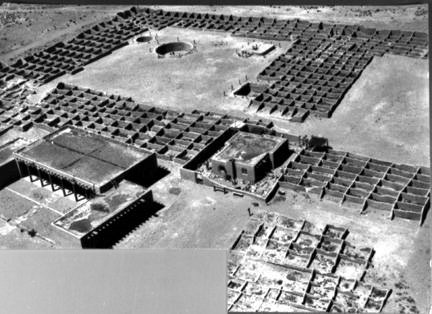
Kuaua ruins, Coronado State Monument, 1940

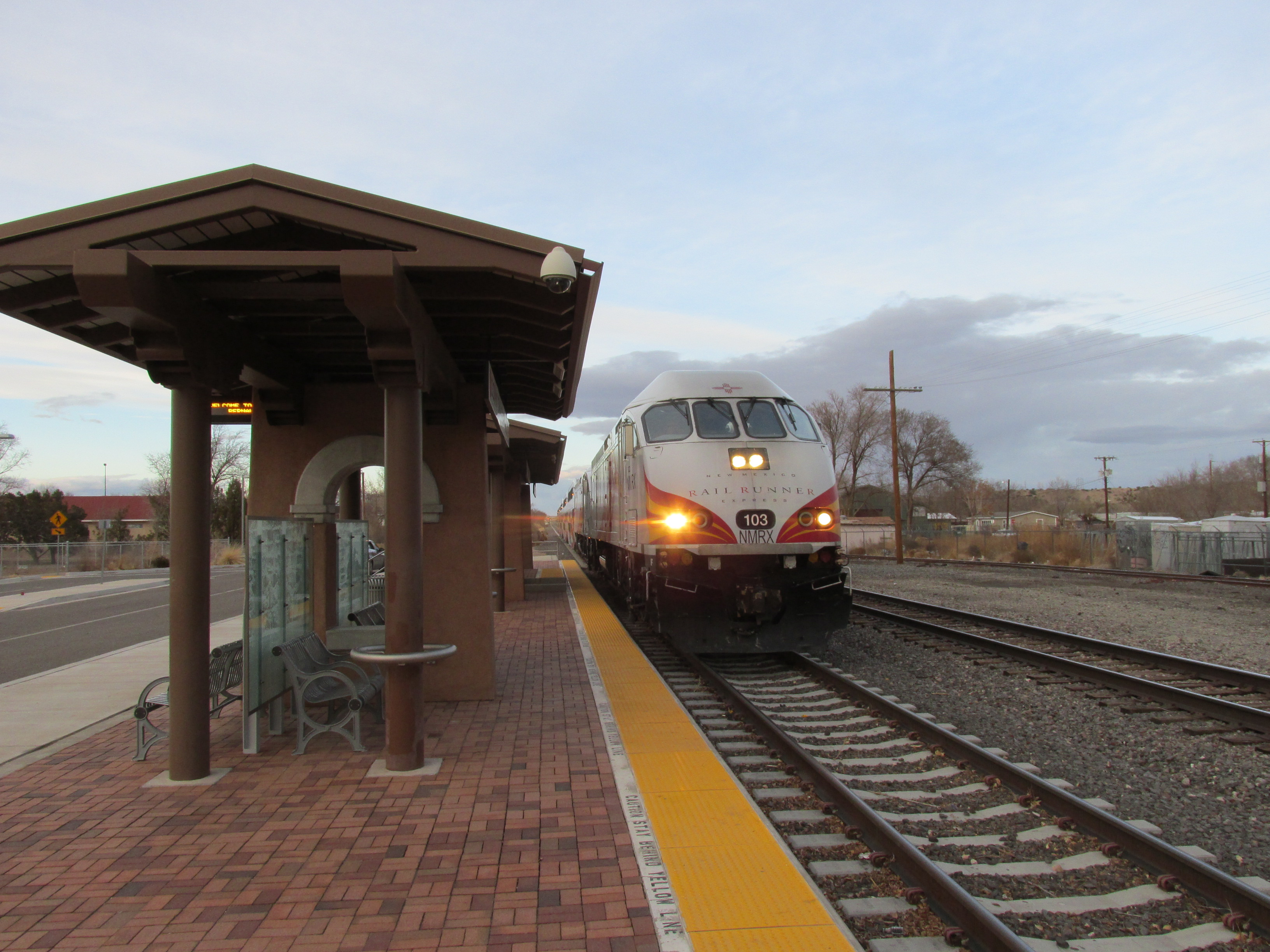
Downtown Bernalillo Rail Runner station, Bernalillo

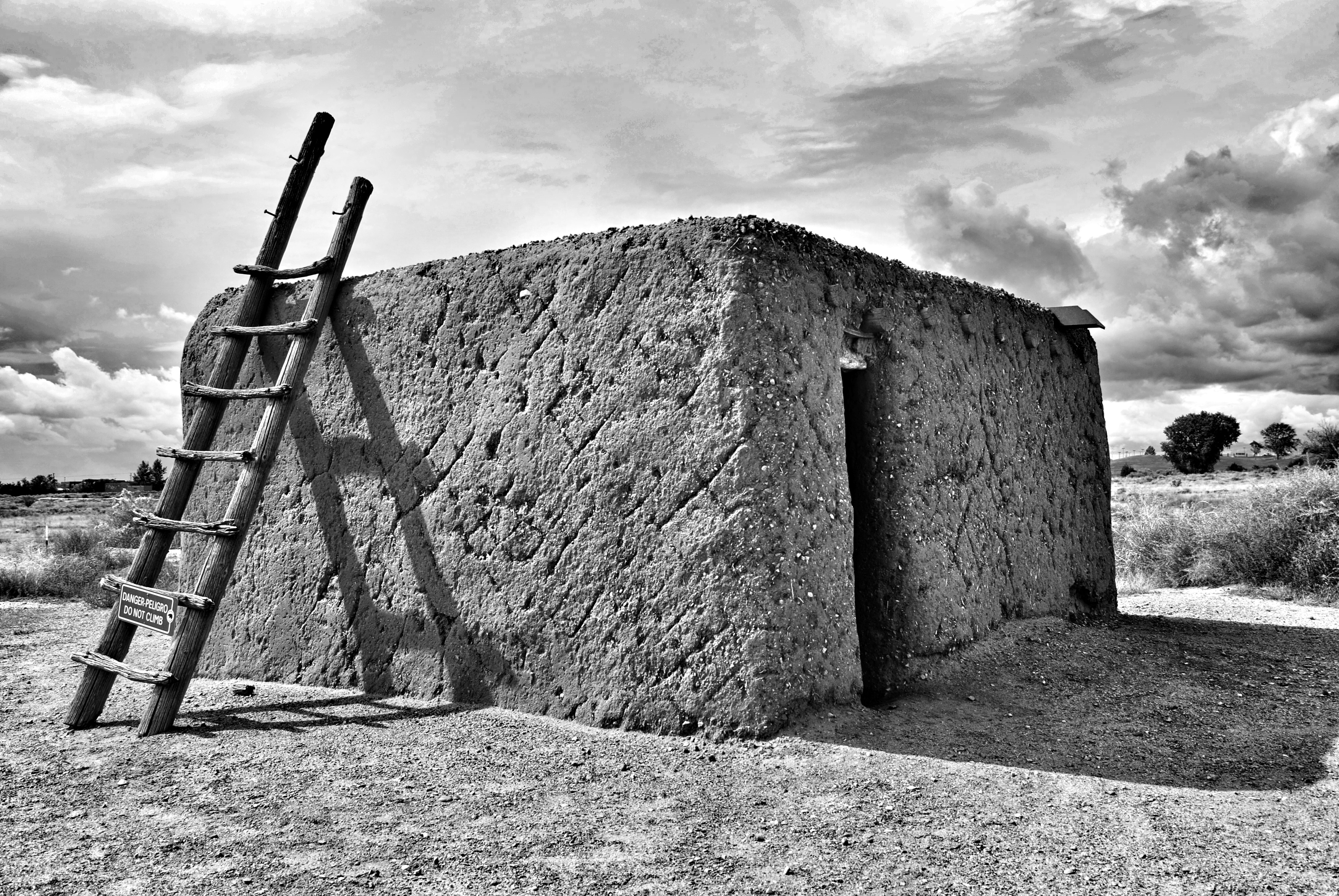
Pueblo Style House - Coronado State Monument

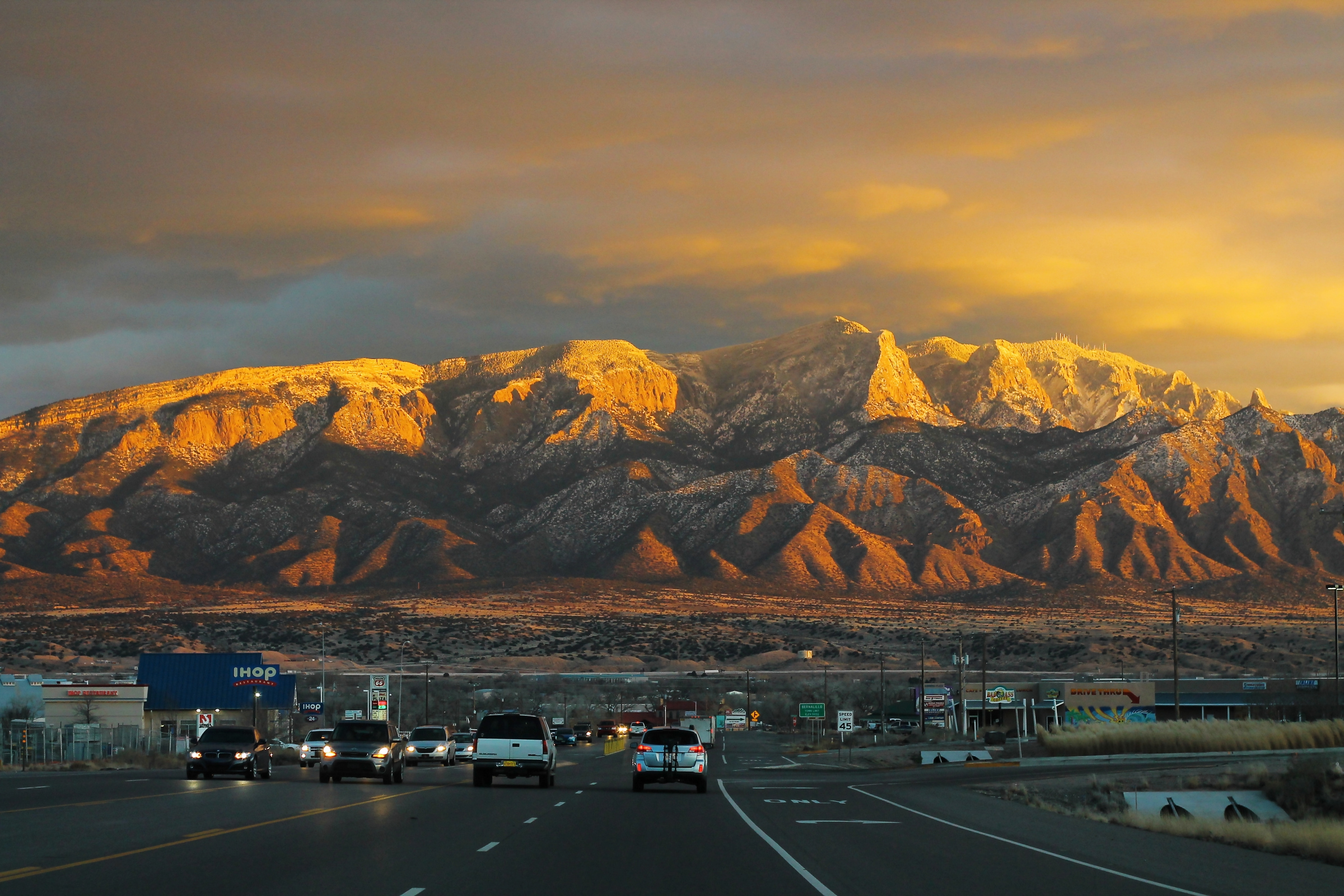
US Route 550 with Sandia Mountains

== See also ==
- List of municipalities in New Mexico
