= Santo Domingo Pueblo, New Mexico =

Kewa Pueblo
- Location in Sandoval County

Total population
- 2,311

Regions with significant populations
- United States (New Mexico)

Languages
- Keres, English

Santo Domingo Pueblo
- Census-designated place
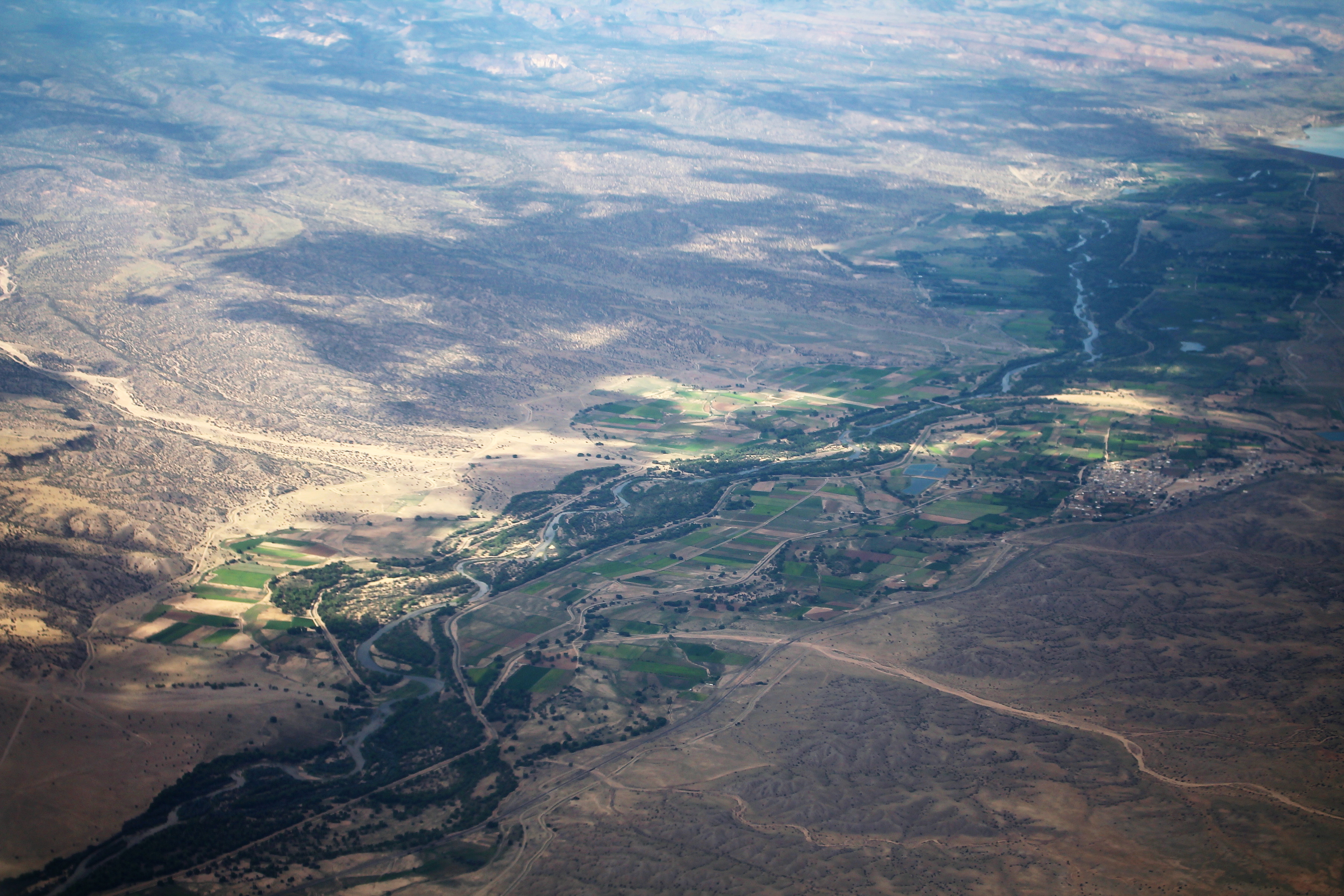
- Aerial image of Kewa Pueblo

- Location in New Mexico

- Location in the United States
- Coordinates: 35°30′52″N 106°21′48″W
- Country: United States
- State: New Mexico
- County: Sandoval

Area
  - Total: 2.05 sq mi (5.32 km^{2})
  - Land: 2.04 sq mi (5.28 km^{2})
  - Water: 0.015 sq mi (0.04 km^{2})
- Elevation: 5,187 ft (1,581 m)

Population (2020)
  - Total: 2,311
  - Density: 1,133.8/sq mi (437.78/km^{2})
- Time zone: UTC-7 (Mountain (MST))
  - Summer (DST): UTC-6 (MDT)
- ZIP code: 87052
- Area code: 505
- FIPS code: 35-70810
- GNIS feature ID: 0928818

- Pueblo of Santo Domingo (Kiua)
- U.S. National Register of Historic Places
- U.S. Historic district
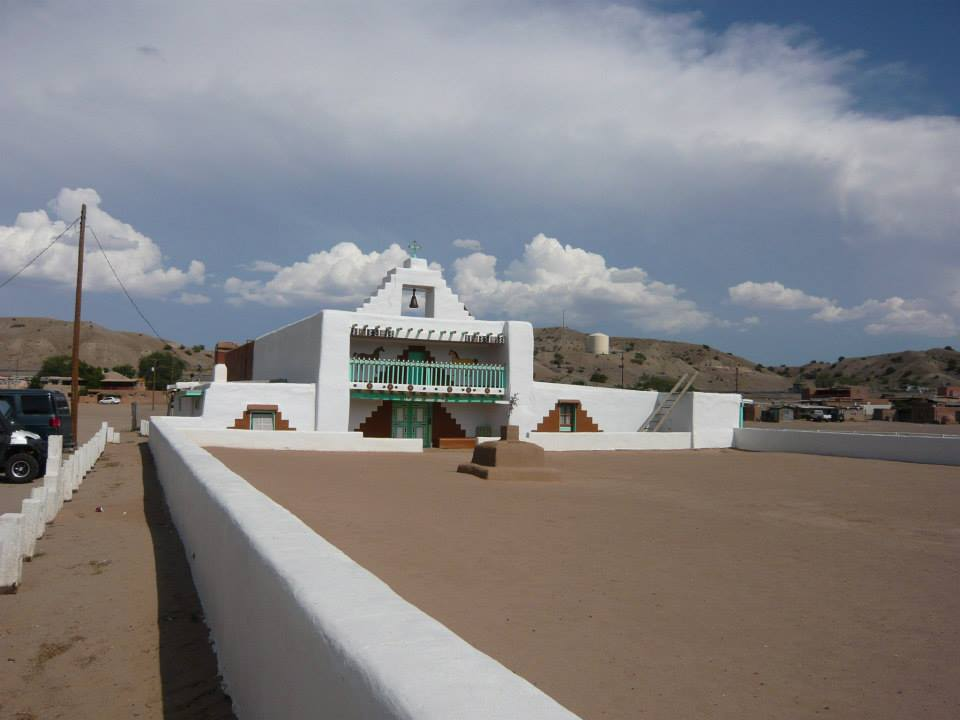

- Location within New Mexico
- Nearest city: Albuquerque, New Mexico
- Area: 48 acres (19 ha)
- Built: 1700
- Architectural style: Mixed (more Than 2 Styles From Different Periods), Pueblo
- NRHP reference No.: 73001145
- Added to NRHP: December 12, 1973

Santo Domingo Pueblo, also known as Kewa Pueblo (also spelled Kiua, Eastern Keres [kʰewɑ], Western Keres: Díiwʾi, Navajo: Tó Hájiiloh) is a federally recognized tribe of Keres Pueblo people in northern New Mexico. As of the 2020 census, Santo Domingo Pueblo had a population of 2,311. Many residents live in structures some of which date from circa 1700; the community is located in Sandoval County (~35 miles (56 km) northeast of Albuquerque, off Interstate 25 southwest of Santa Fe) and is described by the U.S. Census Bureau as a census-designated place.

A 48 acres (19 ha) area of the pueblo was listed on the National Register of Historic Places in 1973. The listing included 80 contributing buildings.

== Culture ==
The population of the pueblo is composed of Native Americans who speak Keres, an eastern dialect of the Keresan languages. Like several other Pueblo peoples, they have a matrilineal kinship system, in which children are considered born into the mother's family and clan, and inheritance and property pass through the maternal line. The pueblo celebrates an annual feast day on August 4 to honor their patron saint, Saint Dominic. More than 2,000 Pueblo people participate in the traditional corn dances held at this time.

== Name ==
On the Catholic saint's day of Santo Domingo in August 1598, conquistador Juan de Oñate had his first encounter with Kewa Pueblo. The Pueblo was subsequently named "Santo Domingo". Its earliest recorded name was Gipuy. According to Pueblo Council members, the local name in their Keres language has always been Kewa. In 2009, the pueblo officially changed its name to Kewa Pueblo, altering its seal, signs and letterhead.

According to the Pueblo of Acoma's Keres Online Dictionary, the Western Keresan-name for the pueblo was Díiwʾi and for its people therefore Dîiwʾamʾé.

== Geography ==
Kewa Pueblo is located at 35°30′52″N 106°21′48″W (35.514483, -106.363429). The pueblo is located approximately 25 miles (40 km) southwest of Santa Fe. Interstate 25 runs 4 miles (6 km) to the east of the community. The pueblo is part of the Albuquerque metropolitan area.

According to the United States Census Bureau, the Santo Domingo CDP that overlays the pueblo has a total area of 2.0 square miles (5.2 km^{2}), all land.

== Demographics ==
Historical population
Census	Pop.	Note	%±
2020	2,311		—
U.S. Decennial Census

=== 2020 census ===
As of the 2020 census, Santo Domingo Pueblo had a population of 2,311. The median age was 31.9 years. 28.6% of residents were under the age of 18 and 13.2% of residents were 65 years of age or older. For every 100 females there were 101.3 males, and for every 100 females age 18 and over there were 97.3 males age 18 and over.

0.0% of residents lived in urban areas, while 100.0% lived in rural areas.

There were 479 households in Santo Domingo Pueblo, of which 52.8% had children under the age of 18 living in them. Of all households, 21.5% were married-couple households, 21.1% were households with a male householder and no spouse or partner present, and 49.3% were households with a female householder and no spouse or partner present. About 14.9% of all households were made up of individuals and 6.9% had someone living alone who was 65 years of age or older.

There were 494 housing units, of which 3.0% were vacant. The homeowner vacancy rate was 0.0% and the rental vacancy rate was 0.0%.

Racial composition as of the 2020 census
Race	Number	Percent
White	2	0.1%
Black or African American	0	0.0%
American Indian and Alaska Native	2,083	90.1%
Asian	0	0.0%
Native Hawaiian and Other Pacific Islander	0	0.0%
Some other race	0	0.0%
Two or more races	226	9.8%
Hispanic or Latino (of any race)	221	9.6%

=== 2010 census ===
The 2010 census found that 2,456 people lived in the CDP, while 3,519 people in the U.S. reported being exclusively Santo Domingo Puebloan and 4,430 people reported being Santo Domingo Puebloan exclusively or in combination with another group.

== Government ==
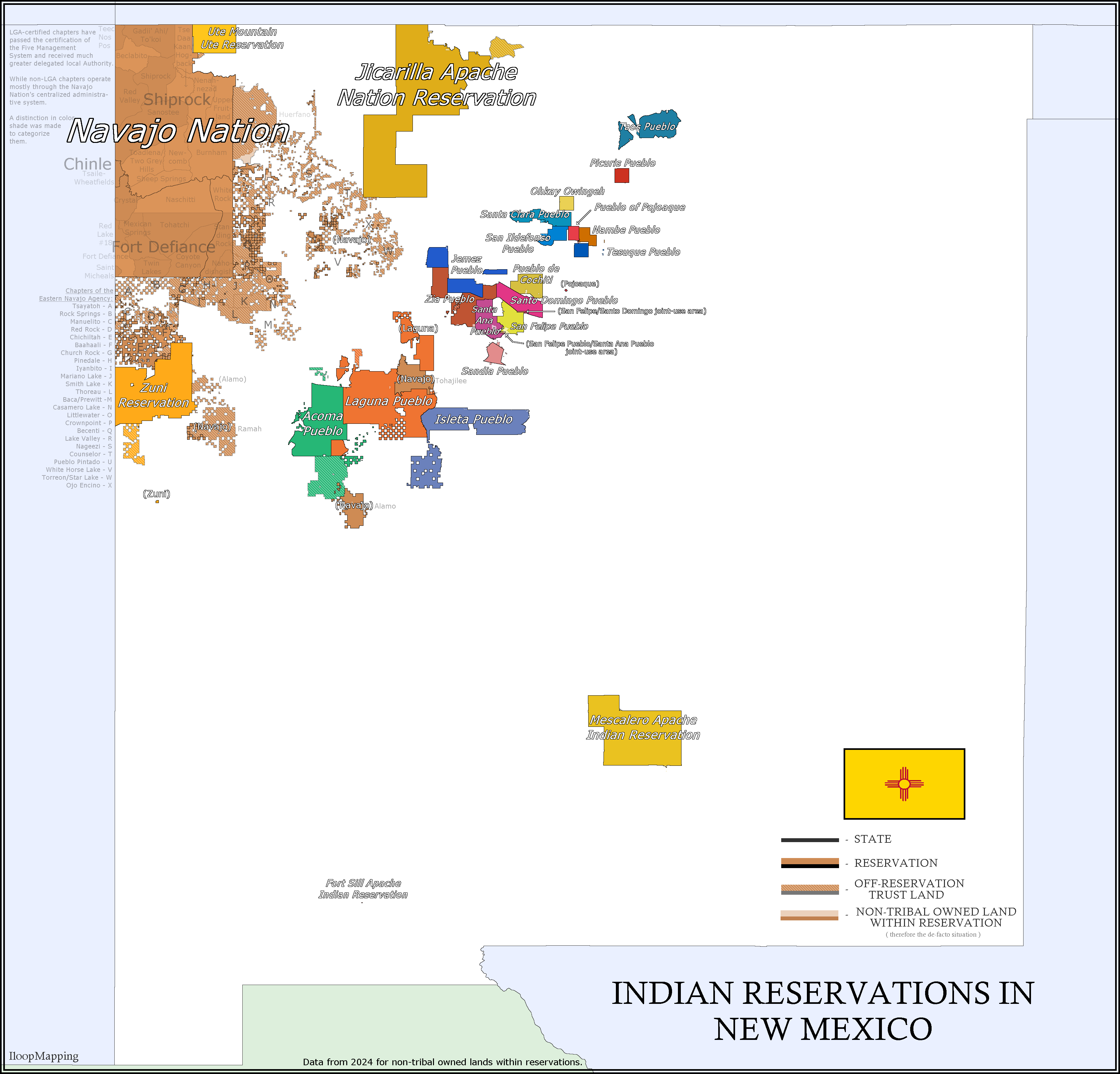
Map of the Santo Domingo and neighboring tribes (In pink).

The administration of the Kewa Pueblo in 2026 is:

- Governor: Raymond Aguilar, Jr.
- Lieutenant Governor: Ivan Garcia

== History ==
The pueblo plays a supporting role in Spanish colonial history. Francisco Vázquez de Coronado made first contact with Kewa in 1540. When the Spanish first came to the Rio Grande Valley, they found over 70 villages that manufactured goods and had a strong trade network. Kewa was one of these villages. After first contact, Spanish expeditions into the area continued, one of them being Juan de Oñate's expedition in 1598. Oñate arrived in Kewa Pueblo with the intention of bringing Kewa and pueblos in its vicinity under Spanish rule. Soon after his visit, a mission was established and a church was built. In 1680, Kewa and other nearby pueblos rose in revolt against their Spanish colonizers, killing four priests and Spanish settlers nearby. Similar strife occurred again during the tail end of Spanish colonization in the area in 1696. In both cases, the revolts were eventually quelled by the Spanish. A century later, in 1807, Lieutenant Zebulon Pike visited Kewa. In his journal, he described the church as adorned with elegantly ornamented paintings, one of which being Saint Domingo.

Gaspar Castaño de Sosa, a fugitive from the Crown, was arrested at the pueblo in March 1591. Castaño, a notorious slaver, had fled capture. He pursued an illegal claims expedition up the Pecos River, which had not yet been seen by Europeans. He made it as far as Pecos Pueblo, and raided it for slaves. He turned west and traveled toward modern-day Santa Fe, which had been established by the Spanish. He followed the Rio Grande river valley south. On orders of the Viceroy at Mexico City, Captain Juan Morlette found Castaño at Kewa Pueblo and arrested him. He returned him to authorities to face trial for his crimes, including his attack on Pecos Pueblo.

Castaño abandoned two interpreters at Kewa Pueblo, Tomas and Cristobal; he had kidnapped them earlier and brought them with him. Governor Juan de Oñate's expedition recorded encountering Tomas and Cristobal at Kewa Pueblo, as it traveled north.

=== 20th century to present ===
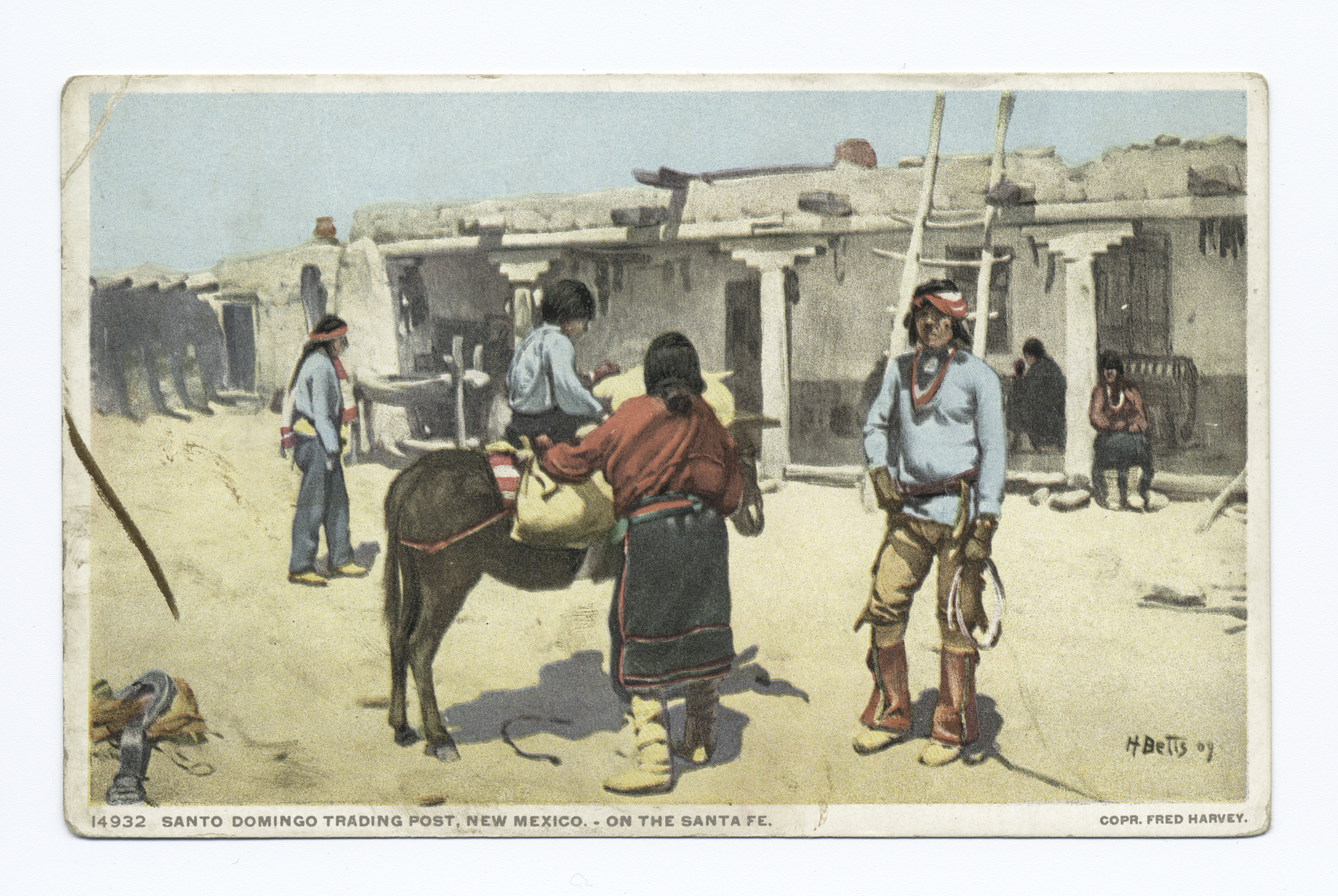
Trading Post, early 20th century

Potters of Kewa and Cochiti Pueblos have made stylized pottery for centuries, developing styles for different purposes and expressing deep beliefs in their designs. Since the early decades of the 20th century, these pots have been appreciated by a wider audience outside the pueblos. Continuing to use traditional techniques, in the late 20th and early 21st centuries, potters have also expanded their designs and repertoire in pottery, which has an international market.

== Belief system ==
Kewa members, similar to other Indigenous populations in the Rio Grande region, believe their people emerged from the inner earth from a place in the north called Shipap. As the legend goes, from Shipap they migrated southwards, breaking off into smaller groups along the way. These breakaway groups would go on to found other pueblos.

== Government ==
The highest official in the pueblo is called the Cacique. Although he is the highest ranking official, he does not serve as ruler. Rather, he serves as a priest, and conducts a multitude of religious ceremonies.

== Visual arts ==
Kewa artists are known for their stonework jewelry, including flat disks or beads called heishi, meaning "shell bead" in Eastern Keresan, which are often made into necklaces.

Angie Reano Owen grew up in the Reano family of heishi beadmakers. She is a Kewa inlay jeweler and lapidary artist. Her designs are inspired by prehistoric Anasazi and Hohokam inlay designs. Today, the Reano family has continued to develop the art of shell and stone inlay jewelry.

=== Pottery ===
Pottery is an important art form and utilitarian craft from Kewa Pueblo. Large ollas and dough bowls are common forms for Kewa potters. Many Kewa potters are women, although men can also create ceramics. In the 1920's, tourism catalyzed by a nearby railway stop in the town of Wallace, drew attention to Kewa and its pottery. Pottery would become a valuable export for Kewa during this time.

The Aguilar Family, consisting of two sisters and one sister-in-law, created Kewa pottery from 1910 until approximately 1915 and became very well-known for their artwork.

Robert Tenorio has continued his family legacy by making traditional Kewa pottery, and Tenorio's sister was part of a well-known husband-wife pottery collaboration called, Arthur and Hilda Coriz.

== Education ==
It is in the Bernalillo Public Schools district, which operates Santo Domingo Elementary and Middle Schools, and Bernalillo High School.

The school district states that Cochiti Elementary and Middle Schools in Peña Blanca and Bernalillo Middle School have students from Kewa Pueblo. Bernalillo Middle School (a zoned middle school of this community), Some elementary-aged students from Kewa Pueblo attend Algodones Elementary School in Algodones.
