= San Felipe Pueblo, New Mexico =

San Felipe Pueblo, New Mexico Katishtya (Eastern Keres)
- CDP
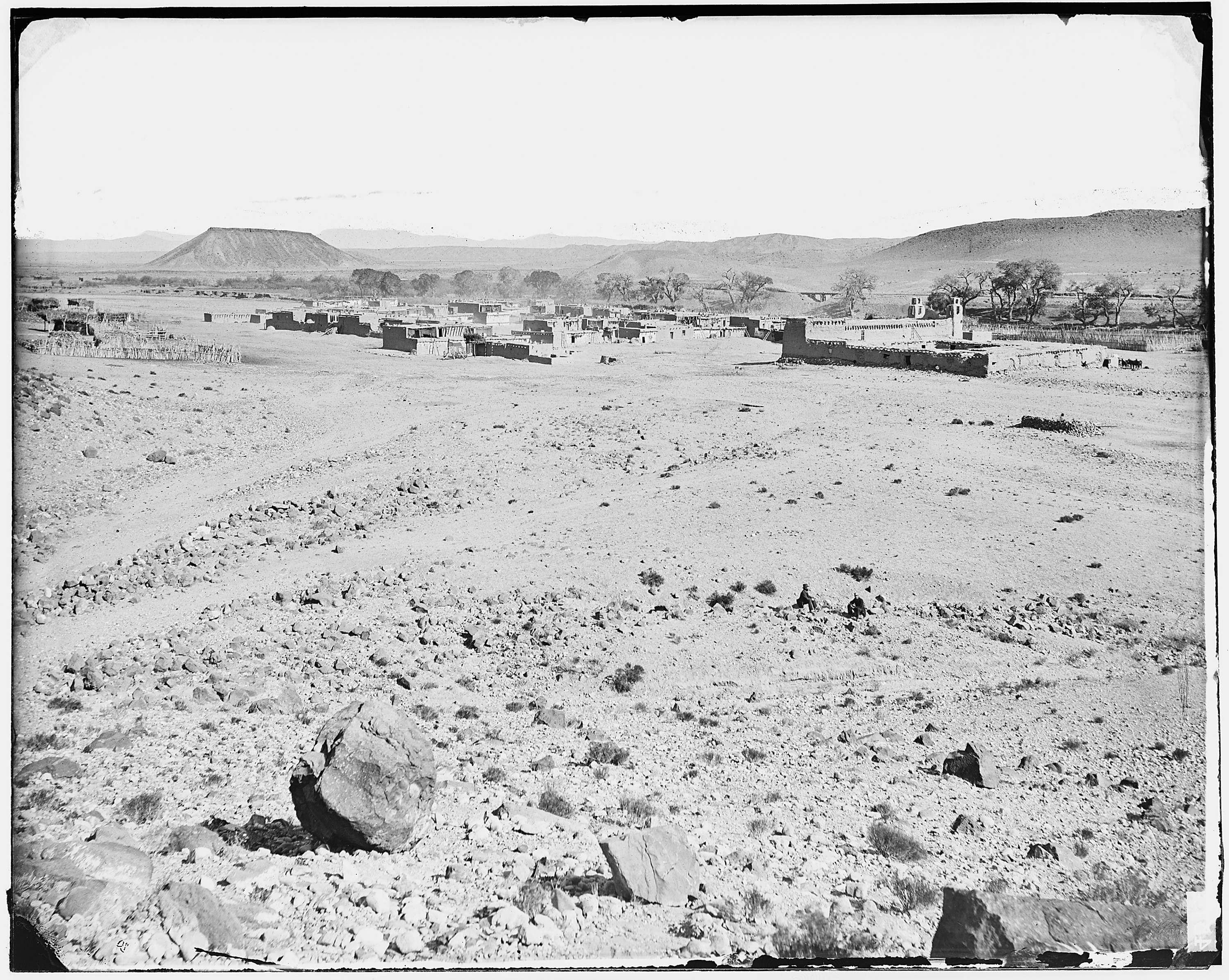
- San Felipe Pueblo
- Nickname: Katishtya
- Location of San Felipe Pueblo, New Mexico

- Location in the United States San Felipe Pueblo (the United States)
- Coordinates: 35°25′37″N 106°26′37″W
- Country: United States
- State: New Mexico
- County: Sandoval

Area
  - Total: 12.26 sq mi (31.76 km^{2})
  - Land: 11.98 sq mi (31.04 km^{2})
  - Water: 0.28 sq mi (0.73 km^{2})
- Elevation: 5,131 ft (1,564 m)

Population (2020)
  - Total: 2,542
  - Density: 212.1/sq mi (81.91/km^{2})
- Time zone: UTC-7 (Mountain (MST))
  - Summer (DST): UTC-6 (MDT)
- Area code: 505
- FIPS code: 35-67450
- GNIS feature ID: 0928802

San Felipe Pueblo (Eastern Keres: Katishtya, Navajo Tsédááʼkin) is a census-designated place (CDP) in Sandoval County, New Mexico, United States, and is located 10 miles (16 km) north of Bernalillo. As of the 2020 census, San Felipe Pueblo had a population of 2,542. It is part of the Albuquerque metropolitan area.

== Laws ==
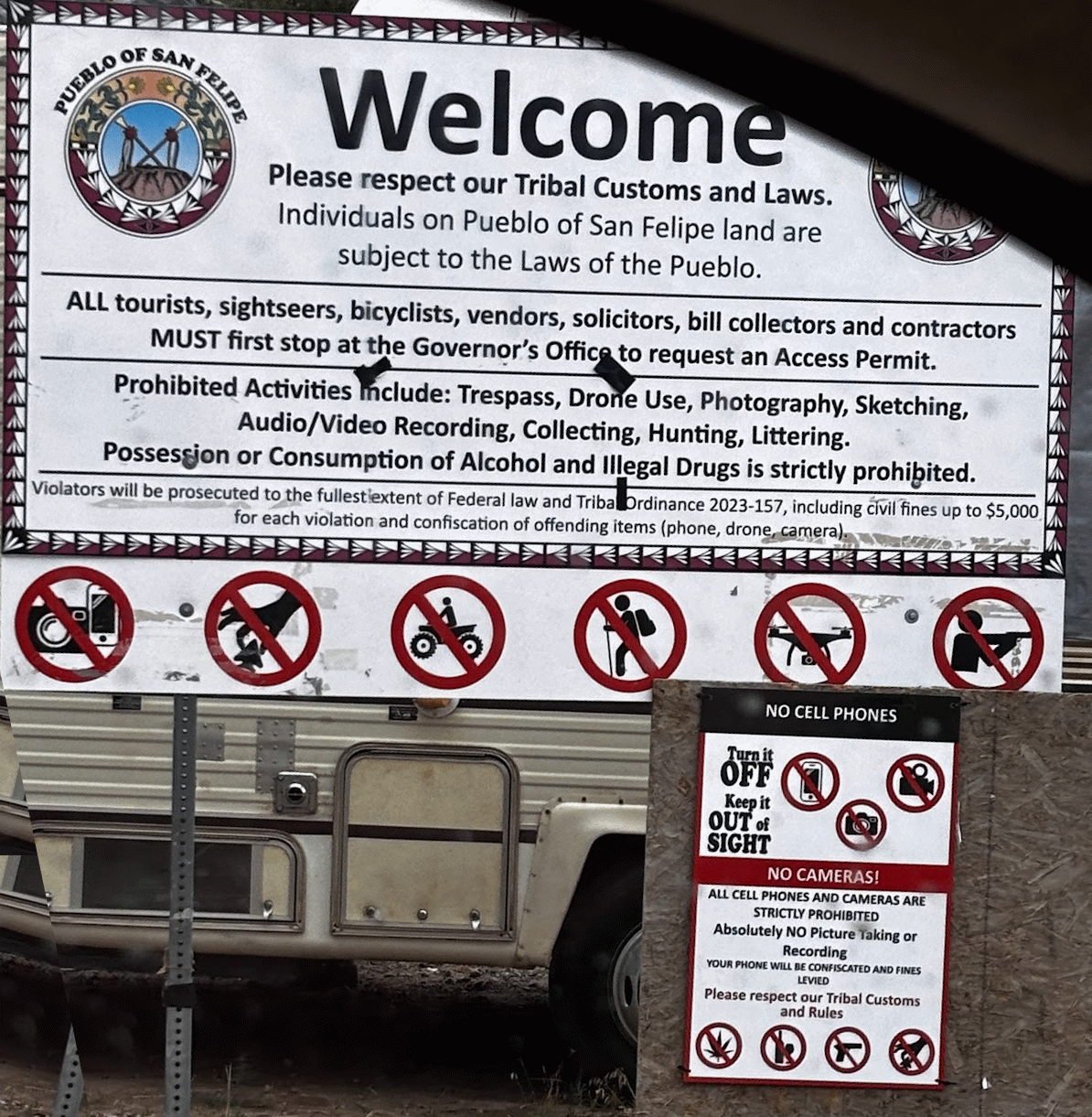
Regulatory sign informing visitors of tribal laws

As a sovereign tribal nation, San Felipe Pueblo exercises strict restrictions for non-tribal visitors, and features numerous rules and regulations on visitor activity. Access is prohibited for any reason without a permit. Any audio or visual documentation, including sketching, is prohibited without a permit. While the Pueblo permits visitor access during public events, photography of these events is strictly prohibited; the tribal government claims the right to confiscate equipment upon suspicion that it has been used to violate regulations.

== Government ==
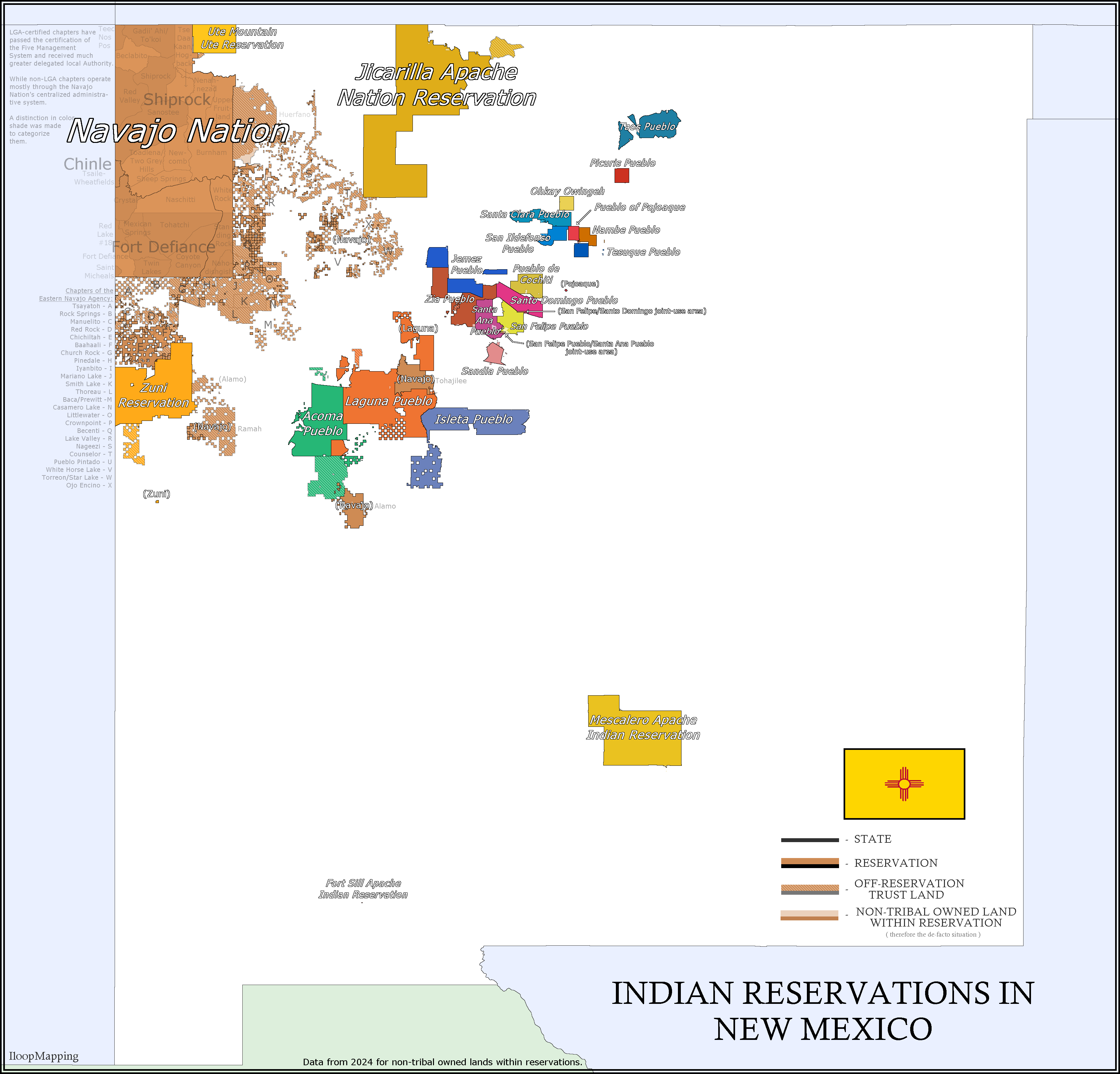
Map of the San Felipe and neighboring tribes (In yellow).

The administration of the Pueblo of San Felipe in 2025 is:

- Governor: Anthony Ortiz
- Lieutenant Governor: James Tenorio

== Culture ==
The Pueblo, founded in 1706, is home to a Native American Nation who speak an eastern dialect of the Keresan languages.

The Pueblo celebrates the annual Feast of St. Philip on May 1, when hundreds of pueblo people participate in traditional corn dances.

Today, the tribe operates Black Mesa Casino formerly San Felipe Casino and Casino Hollywood, just off Interstate 25.

== Geography ==
San Felipe Pueblo is located at 35°25′37″N 106°26′37″W (35.426985, -106.443593).

According to the United States Census Bureau, the CDP has a total area of 12.2 square miles (31.6 km^{2}), of which 11.9 square miles (30.8 km^{2}) is land and 0.3 square mile (0.8 km^{2}) (2.46%) is water.

== Demographics ==
Historical population
Census	Pop.	Note	%±
2020	2,542		—
U.S. Decennial Census

=== 2020 census ===
As of the 2020 census, San Felipe Pueblo had a population of 2,542. The median age was 30.8 years. 30.1% of residents were under the age of 18 and 10.2% of residents were 65 years of age or older. For every 100 females there were 97.5 males, and for every 100 females age 18 and over there were 93.3 males age 18 and over.

0.0% of residents lived in urban areas, while 100.0% lived in rural areas.

There were 546 households in San Felipe Pueblo, of which 57.7% had children under the age of 18 living in them. Of all households, 25.8% were married-couple households, 14.8% were households with a male householder and no spouse or partner present, and 46.9% were households with a female householder and no spouse or partner present. About 12.3% of all households were made up of individuals and 5.7% had someone living alone who was 65 years of age or older.

There were 561 housing units, of which 2.7% were vacant. The homeowner vacancy rate was 0.0% and the rental vacancy rate was 0.0%.

Racial composition as of the 2020 census
Race	Number	Percent
White	8	0.3%
Black or African American	2	0.1%
American Indian and Alaska Native	2,505	98.5%
Asian	2	0.1%
Native Hawaiian and Other Pacific Islander	0	0.0%
Some other race	5	0.2%
Two or more races	20	0.8%
Hispanic or Latino (of any race)	36	1.4%

=== 2000 census ===
As of the census of 2000, there were 2,080 people, 368 households, and 341 families residing in the CDP. The population density was 174.6 inhabitants per square mile (67.4/km^{2}). There were 405 housing units at an average density of 34.0 per square mile (13.1/km^{2}). The racial makeup of the CDP was 99.18% Native American, 0.10% White, 0.29% from other races, and 0.43% from two or more races. Hispanic or Latino of any race were 0.62% of the population.

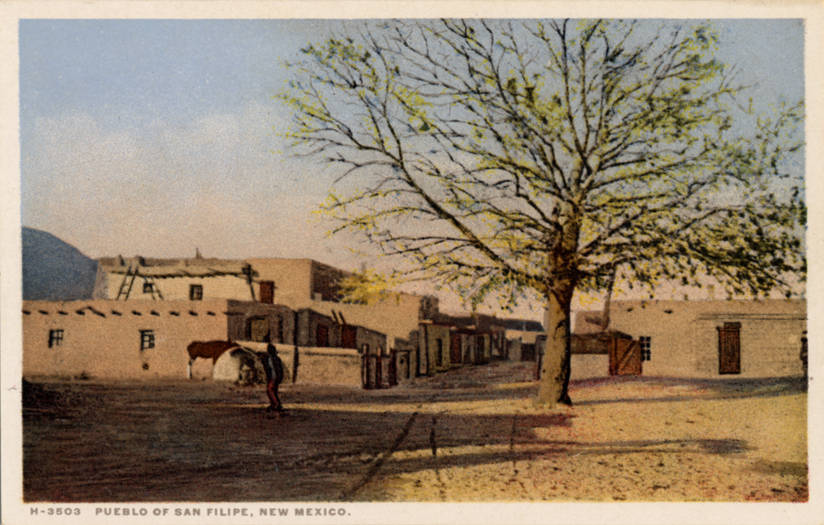

There were 368 households, out of which 45.1% had children under the age of 18 living with them, 34.8% were married couples living together, 38.9% had a female householder with no husband present, and 7.1% were non-families. 5.4% of all households were made up of individuals, and 0.5% had someone living alone who was 65 years of age or older. The average household size was 5.65 and the average family size was 5.60.

In the CDP, the population was spread out, with 37.7% under the age of 18, 12.0% from 18 to 24, 31.3% from 25 to 44, 14.7% from 45 to 64, and 4.3% who were 65 years of age or older. The median age was 25 years. For every 100 females, there were 102.7 males. For every 100 females age 18 and over, there were 96.2 males.

The median income for a household in the CDP was $29,800, and the median income for a family was $28,264. Males had a median income of $17,162 versus $16,771 for females. The per capita income for the CDP was $6,225. About 34.3% of families and 38.2% of the population were below the poverty line, including 49.1% of those under the age of 18 and 42.1% of those 65 and older.

== Education ==
It is in the Bernalillo Public Schools district. Algodones Elementary School is the zoned elementary school that takes students from San Felipe Pueblo. The zoned middle school of this community is Bernalillo Middle School. The Bernalillo district's zoned high school is Bernalillo High School.

The Bureau of Indian Education (BIE) operates the San Felipe Pueblo Elementary School, a federal K-8 school for Native American children, in the pueblo.

== See also ==
- List of census-designated places in New Mexico
- San Felipe Indian Reservation
