= KUPR =

KUPR may refer to:

- KUPR-LP, a low-power radio station (99.9 FM) licensed to serve Placitas, New Mexico, United States
- KLAG, a radio station (91.7 FM) licensed to serve Alamogordo, New Mexico, which held the call sign KUPR from 1997 to 2013
- KSSX, a radio station (95.7 FM) licensed to serve Carlsbad, California, United States, which held the call sign KUPR from 1995 to 1997
