= Cochiti Lake, New Mexico =

CDP in New Mexico, United States

- Census-designated place
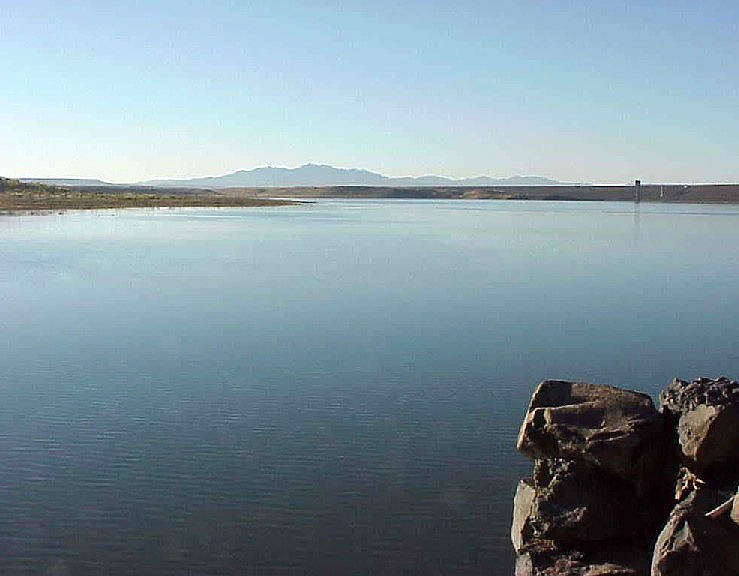
- Cochiti Dam

- Location within New Mexico
- Coordinates: 35°38′53″N 106°20′15″W
- Country: United States
- State: New Mexico
- County: Sandoval

Area
  - Total: 1.24 sq mi (3.22 km^{2})
  - Land: 1.24 sq mi (3.22 km^{2})
  - Water: 0 sq mi (0.00 km^{2})
- Elevation: 5,584 ft (1,702 m)

Population (2020)
  - Total: 438
  - Density: 352.3/sq mi (136.03/km^{2})
- Time zone: UTC-7 (Mountain (MST))
  - Summer (DST): UTC-6 (MDT)
- ZIP code: 87083
- Area code: 505
- GNIS feature ID: 916010

Cochiti Lake is a census-designated place in Sandoval County, New Mexico, United States. As of the 2020 census, Cochiti Lake had a population of 438.

== Demographics ==
At the 2020 Decennial Census, there was a population of 438, 305 total housing units and 273 family households. The employment rate was 38.9% and the average income was US$57,375. 4.2% of the population doesn't have healthcare coverage and 52.2% has a bachelor degree of higher education. The racial makeup of the CDP was 70 American Indian and Alaskan native, 1 Asian, 5 black or African American, 70 Hispanic or Latino, 273 were not Hispanic or Latino and 14 were of other races. 64 had two or more races and 284 were white. The poverty rate among the population is 11.1% with 43.1% of people under the age of 18 being in poverty.

Historical population
Census	Pop.	Note	%±
2020	438		—
U.S. Decennial Census

== Education ==
It is in the Bernalillo Public Schools district, which operates Cochiti Elementary and Middle Schools in Peña Blanca (the zoned elementary and middle school for this community), and Bernalillo High School.
