= La Madera, New Mexico =

La Madera is the name of two populated places in the U.S. state of New Mexico:

- La Madera, Rio Arriba County, New Mexico
- La Madera, Sandoval County, New Mexico
