= Angie Reano Owen =

Santo Domingo Pueblo jewelry artist from New Mexico, U.S. (born 1946)

- Born: Angelita Reano; 1946 (age 79–80); Santo Domingo Pueblo
- Citizenship: Santo Domingo Pueblo and U.S.
- Education: Albuquerque High School (1965)
- Known for: mosaic inlay jewelry
- Spouse: Don Owen
- Parents: Joe Isidro Reano (father); Clara Lovato Reano (mother)

Angelita "Angie" Reano Owen (born 1946) is a Santo Domingo Pueblo jeweler and lapidary artist from New Mexico.

Owen is known for her intricate jewelry that draws inspiration from precontact Ancestral Pueblo and Hohokam designs. She is recognized for helping to revitalize Pueblo shell mosaic inlay in the 1970s.

== Early life and education ==
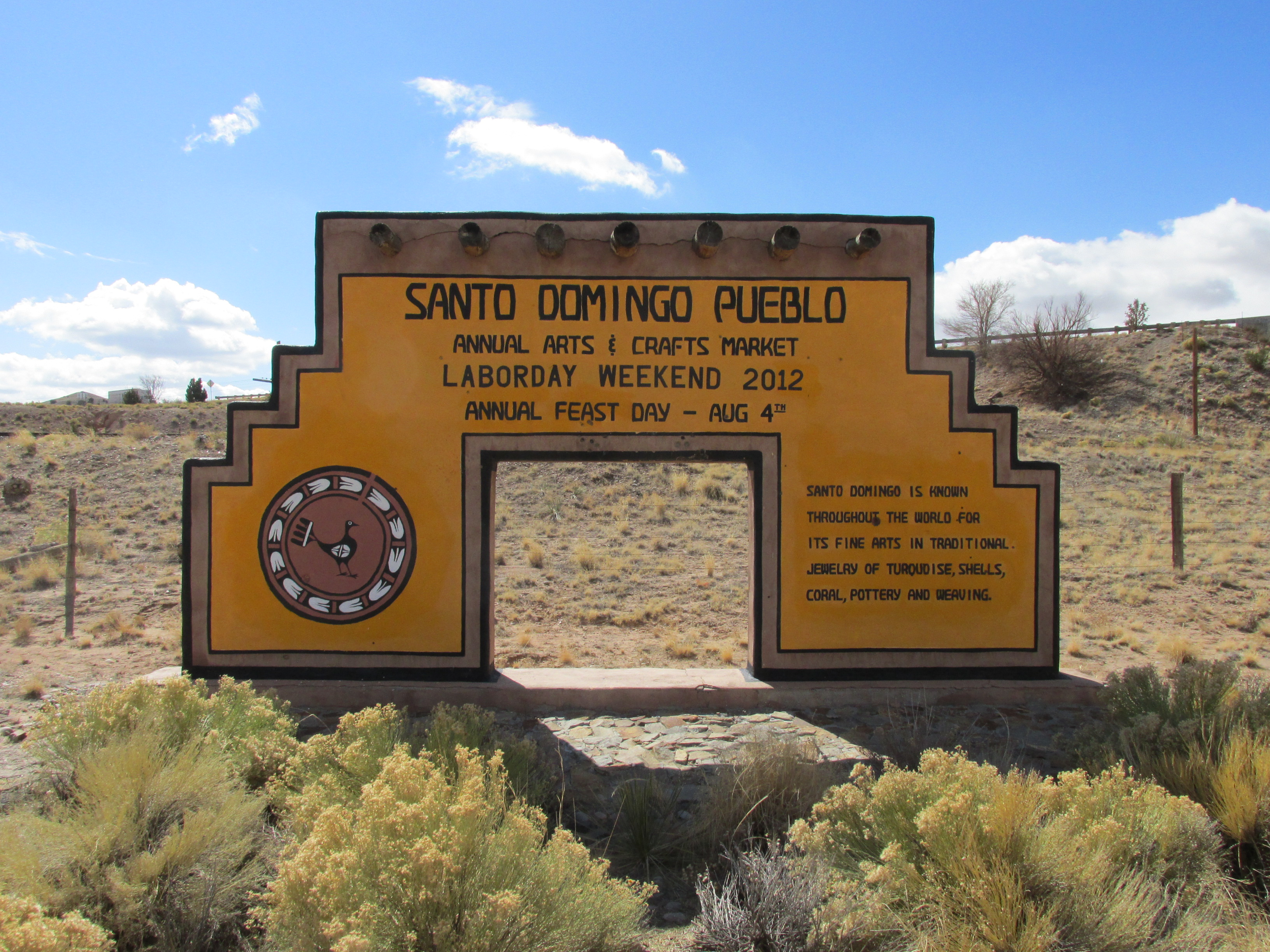
Santa Domingo Pueblo, birthplace of Angie Reano Owen

Owen was born in 1946 to Joe Isidro and Clara Lovato Reano in Santo Domingo Pueblo in New Mexico. Her family was known for their heshi shell beads, and her mother was a jeweler. She attended Bernalillo High School and graduated from Albuquerque High School in 1965.

As one of Joe and Clara's eight children, she joined in the family's jewelry business, making Thunderbird necklaces for the tourist trade, after the boom in interest in Southwestern jewelry. Owen and her brothers and sisters would sell the family's wares on the steps of the Palace of the Governors in Santa Fe, New Mexico.

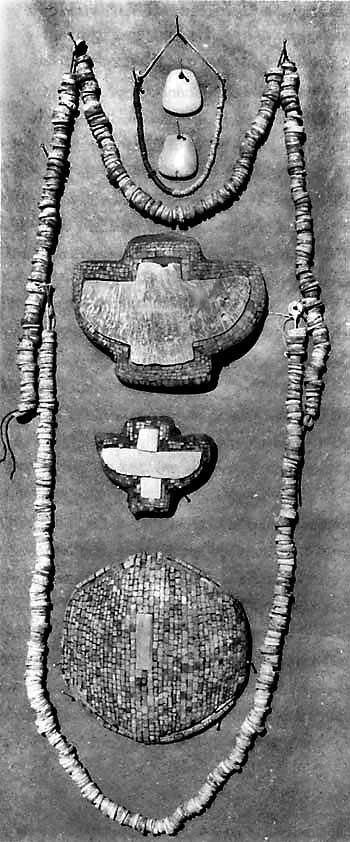
Hohokam turquoise mosaics, an example of the precontact art that inspires Owen's jewelry designs

== Art career ==
In the 1970s, Owen became known for her mastery of ancient Ancestral Pueblo and Hohokam inlay jewelry, a delicate technique which she is noted for reviving.

After a trip to Tucson, Arizona, where she viewed precontact mosaic inlays, Owen began to develop her own take on the traditional artwork. She innovated a technique of combining shell and stone with a unique adhesive that is known only to the family.

Her mosaics use slices of stones and shell, such as turquoise, coral and Tiger cowrie, which she arranged in patterns or landscapes and inlays with epoxy. They are carefully placed, set, then sanded smooth.

By the 1980s, her designs became more elaborate, with mosaic designs adorning complex organic forms, arranged in an "unconventional integration of various prehistoric and postmodern design elements". Owen's designs are noted for their intricacy and multifaceted surfaces of inlaid shells, stones. and natural materials.

Owen is recognized for helping popularize this traditional Ancestral Pueblo style of Native American jewelry, which was not previously well known. After developing her technique, she taught her family members to carry on the tradition, including her brother Joe, sister in law Angie P. Reano, and her children Rena, Dean and Donna. Other members of the Reano Owen family have gone on to become talented inlay jewelry artisans in their own right.

== Honors and awards ==
In 1995, she was named the Ronald and Susan Dubin Artist Fellow at the School for Advanced Research in Santa Fe.

Owen's artwork has won several Best of Division awards at the Santa Fe Indian Market and Heard Museum Fair in Phoenix, Arizona.

== Collections ==
- School for Advanced Research, Indian Arts Research Center
- Museum of Fine Arts Boston
- National Museum of the American Indian
- IAIA Museum of Contemporary Native Arts, Santa Fe
- Nelson-Atkins Museum of Art, Kansas City, MO

== Selected exhibitions ==
- Get a Bead On: Jewelry and Small Objects, Racine Art Museum
- RAM Showcase: Focus on Adornment, Racine Art Museum
- Totems to Turquoise, American Museum of Natural History New York
- Turquoise, Water Sky: The Stone and Its Meaning, Museum of Indian Arts and Culture Santa Fe
- Water, Wind, Breath: Southwest Native Art, Barnes Foundation

== See also ==
- Glycymeris, a shell of a saltwater clam that Owen uses in her jewelry designs following the Hohokam tradition
- Olivella white shells used in her designs
- Spiny oyster, mollusk shell used in her designs
