= Paa-Ko, New Mexico =

- Census-designated place
- Location within New Mexico Location within the United States
- Coordinates: 35°11′59″N 106°20′01″W
- Country: United States
- State: New Mexico
- County: Bernalillo

Area
  - Total: 5.80 sq mi (15.03 km^{2})
  - Land: 5.80 sq mi (15.03 km^{2})
  - Water: 0 sq mi (0.00 km^{2})
- Elevation: 6,644 ft (2,025 m)

Population (2020)
  - Total: 818
  - Density: 140.9/sq mi (54.42/km^{2})
- Time zone: UTC-7 (Mountain (MST))
  - Summer (DST): UTC-6 (MDT)
- ZIP Code: 87047 (Sandia Park)
- Area code: 505
- FIPS code: 35-54675
- GNIS feature ID: 2806684

Paa-Ko is a census-designated place (CDP) in Bernalillo County, New Mexico, United States, built around the Paa-Ko Ridge Golf Club. It was first listed as a CDP prior to the 2020 census. As of the 2020 census, Paa-Ko had a population of 818.

The CDP is in northeastern Bernalillo County on the northwest side of New Mexico State Road 14. It is bordered to the southeast, across NM 14, by Edgewood, and to the north it is bordered by La Madera in Sandoval County. Via NM 14, Paa-Ko is 3 miles (5 km) northeast of San Antonito, 10 miles (16 km) northeast of Interstate 40 at Tijeras, and 7 miles (11 km) southwest of Golden.

The community is on the west side of the valley of San Pedro Creek, a north-flowing tributary, via Arroyo Tonque, of the Rio Grande. Paa-Ko Pueblo, a ruined pueblo of Tiwa or Tewa people, is situated within the community.

== Demographics ==
Historical population
Census	Pop.	Note	%±
2020	818		—
U.S. Decennial Census

== Education ==
It is zoned to Albuquerque Public Schools.
