= Pueblo of Sandia Village, New Mexico =

Village in Sandoval County, New Mexico, US

- Census-designated place
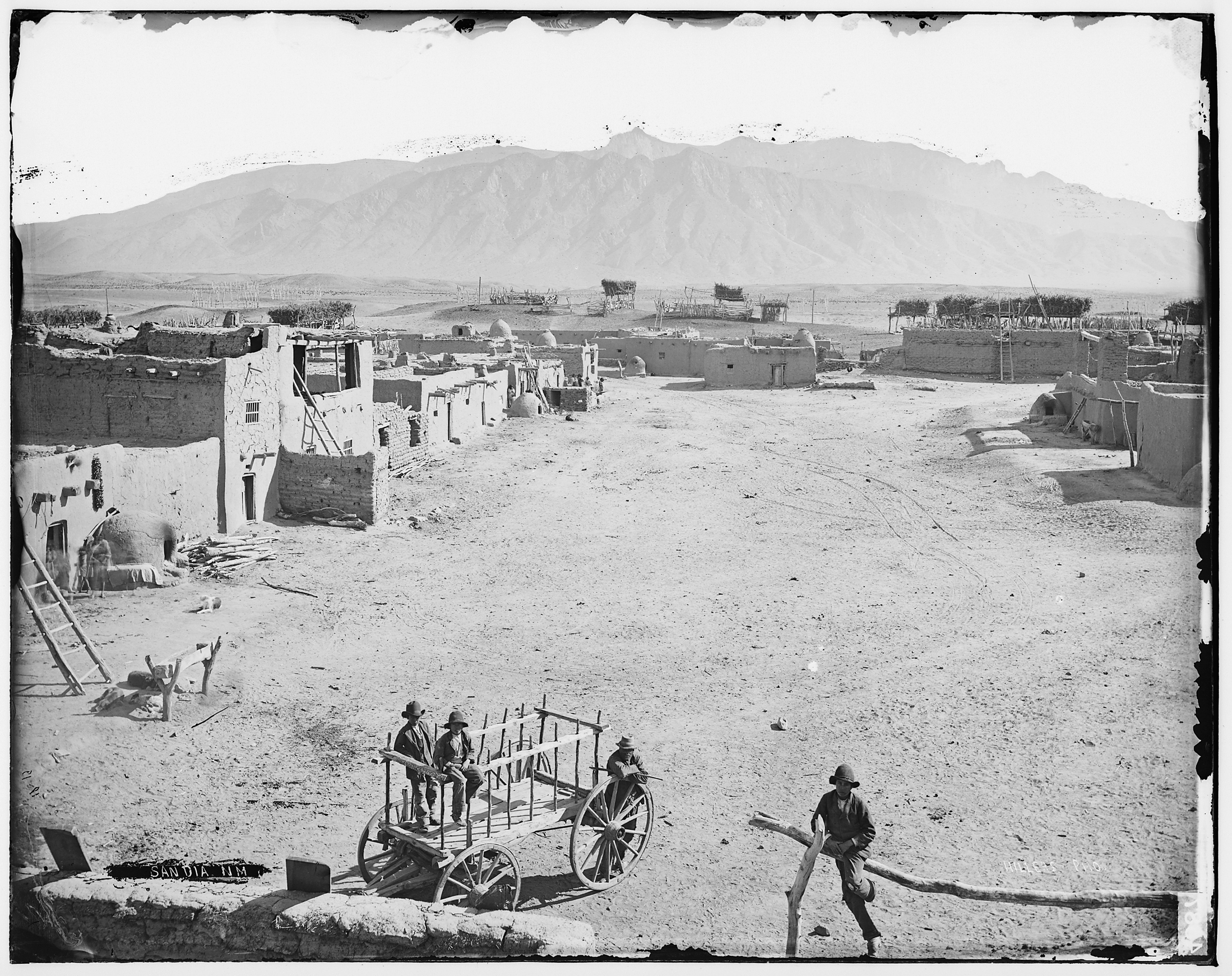
- Sandia Pueblo in the late 1800s.

- Location of the Pueblo of Sandia Village, New Mexico

- Location in New Mexico#Location in the United States Pueblo of Sandia Village (the United States)
- Coordinates: 35°15′22″N 106°34′22″W
- Country: United States
- State: New Mexico
- County: Sandoval

Area
  - Total: 1.14 sq mi (2.94 km^{2})
  - Land: 1.14 sq mi (2.94 km^{2})
  - Water: 0 sq mi (0.00 km^{2})
- Elevation: 5,039 ft (1,536 m)

Population (2020)
  - Total: 421
  - Density: 371.3/sq mi (143.35/km^{2})
- Time zone: UTC-7 (Mountain (MST))
  - Summer (DST): UTC-6 (MDT)
- Area code: 505
- FIPS code: 35-59950
- GNIS feature ID: 1852632

Pueblo of Sandia Village is a census-designated place (CDP) in Sandoval County, New Mexico, United States. As of the 2020 census, Pueblo of Sandia Village had a population of 421. It is part of the Albuquerque Metropolitan Statistical Area.

== Geography ==
Pueblo of Sandia Village is located at 35°15′22″N 106°34′22″W.

According to the United States Census Bureau, the CDP has a total area of 1.0 square mile (2.5 km^{2}), all land.

== Demographics ==
Historical population
Census	Pop.	Note	%±
2020	421		—
U.S. Decennial Census

As of the census of 2000, there were 344 people, 113 households, and 89 families residing in the CDP. The population density was 356.7 inhabitants per square mile (137.7/km^{2}). There were 125 housing units at an average density of 129.6 per square mile (50.0/km^{2}). The racial makeup of the CDP was 4.07% White, 0.29% African American, 94.48% Native American, and 1.16% from two or more races. Hispanic or Latino of any race were 4.07% of the population.

There were 113 households, out of which 44.2% had children under the age of 18 living with them, 31.0% were married couples living together, 29.2% had a female householder with no husband present, and 21.2% were non-families. 16.8% of all households were made up of individuals, and 5.3% had someone living alone who was 65 years of age or older. The average household size was 3.04 and the average family size was 3.35.

In the CDP, the population was spread out, with 33.4% under the age of 18, 10.2% from 18 to 24, 27.6% from 25 to 44, 20.9% from 45 to 64, and 7.8% who were 65 years of age or older. The median age was 29 years. For every 100 females, there were 90.1 males. For every 100 females age 18 and over, there were 90.8 males.

The median income for a household in the CDP was $31,000, and the median income for a family was $35,179. Males had a median income of $25,179 versus $23,906 for females. The per capita income for the CDP was $11,240. About 16.5% of families and 19.8% of the population were below the poverty line, including 24.0% of those under age 18 and 22.7% of those age 65 or over.

== Education ==
It is in the Bernalillo Public Schools district, which operates Bernalillo Middle School (the zoned middle school of this community), and Bernalillo High School.

== See also ==
- List of census-designated places in New Mexico
