= Tawapa =

Former squatted settlement

- Hippie commune
- Interactive map of Tawapa
- Coordinates: 35.324865°N 106.425678°W
- Country: United States
- State: New Mexico
- County: Sandoval County
- Established: c. 1970
- Dissolved: 1990s

Government
  - Type: Commune

Tawapa was a hippie commune that operated north of Placitas, New Mexico. It was founded around 1970 and dissolved in the 1990s. It was located along Las Huertas Creek near the Sandia Mountains. A spring flowed through Tawapa. Watercress grew by the spring.

== History ==
=== Lower Farm ===
At the commune of Lower Farm one Donald Waskey called himself Ulysses, claiming to be the reincarnation of Ulysses S. Grant. He also claimed to be the reincarnation of Vulcan and Jesus Christ. He made a tongue-in-cheek attempt to run for governor of New Mexico in 1969, and murdered two people in 1970. He was the commune's self-proclaimed leader.

=== Tawapa ===
In the late 1960s or early 1970s, due to problems at Lower Farm, several couples left and founded Tawapa along Las Huertas Creek. Many people, especially youth, settled in Tawapa in the 1970s. The commune grew by word of mouth and through magazine articles. They constructed houses there. The commune appeared on a map of hippie communes, drawing more people. Several other communes were founded in the area, such as Sun Farm and Dome Valley. The people living in Tawapa claimed adverse possession over the land. However, they were ultimately evicted by people holding legal title. Housing developments in the 1990s forced people to leave Tawapa.

=== Post-disestablishment ===
Later, environmental damage was caused by the increasing number of houses, as well as groundwater mining. The spring mostly ran dry, while Sun Farm experienced a water shortage in the late 2010s and early 2020s.
