= Bernalillo Public Schools =

School district in New Mexico, United States

- Bernalillo, New Mexico; United States

Information
- Type: School district

Bernalillo Public Schools is a school district with headquarters in Bernalillo, New Mexico, the County Seat of Sandoval County.

== History ==
As of 1970, Hispanic and Latino people are the majority ethnic group in the area. Prior to 1969 the school board had five members. To encourage elections of members of non-Hispanic groups, in 1969 the number of board members increased to seven. The two new board members included an American Indian and a non-Hispanic white person.

Bernalillo High School alumnus Matthew Montaño became the superintendent in 2021.

== Service area ==
Its service area, located north of Albuquerque, New Mexico, includes most of the town of Bernalillo as well as surrounding Algodones, Cochiti, Cochiti Lake, La Madera, Peña Blanca, Placitas, Pueblo of Sandia Village, San Felipe Pueblo, Santo Domingo Pueblo, and most of Santa Ana Pueblo.

== Schools ==
High schools

- Bernalillo High School

K-8 schools

- Cochiti elementary and middle schools
- Santo Domingo elementary and middle schools
- Placitas Elementary and Middle School

Middle schools

- Spartan Learning Academy

Elementary schools

- Algodones Elementary
- Bernalillo Elementary School
- W. D. Carroll Elementary School

Preschool

- La Escuelita Preschool
