= Santa Ana Pueblo, New Mexico =

Native American settlement and federally recognized tribe in New Mexico

Santa Ana Pueblo
- Location of Santa Ana Pueblo

Total population
- 800

Regions with significant populations
- United States (New Mexico)

Languages
- Keres, English, Spanish

Santa Ana Pueblo, New Mexico Tamaya (Eastern Keres)
- CDP
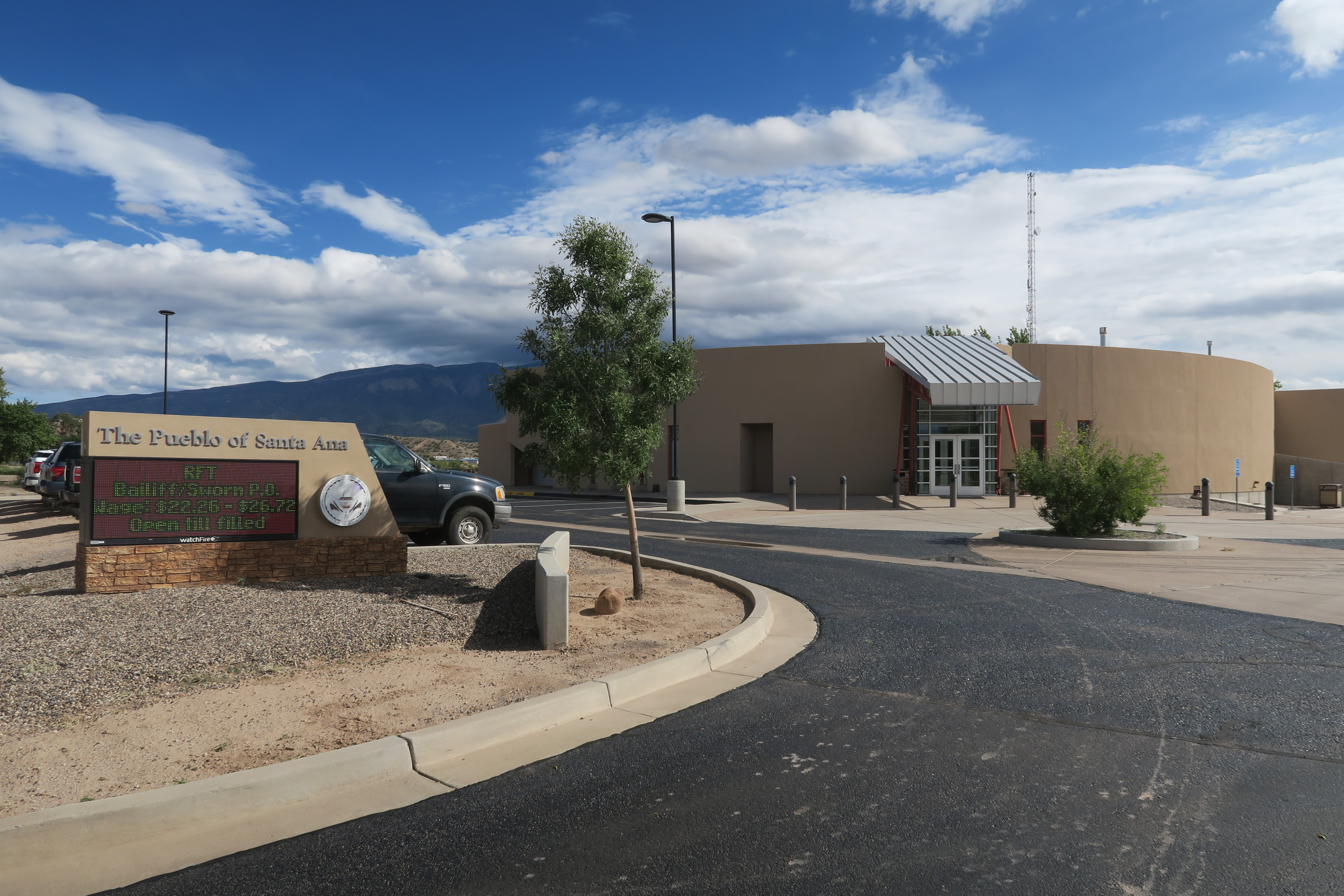
- Pueblo of Santa Ana

- Location of Santa Ana Pueblo, New Mexico

- Location in the United States
- Coordinates: 35°20′44″N 106°31′24″W
- Country: United States
- State: New Mexico
- County: Sandoval

Area
  - Total: 7.54 sq mi (19.52 km^{2})
  - Land: 7.39 sq mi (19.15 km^{2})
  - Water: 0.14 sq mi (0.36 km^{2})
- Elevation: 5,200 ft (1,600 m)

Population (2020)
  - Total: 673
  - Density: 91.0/sq mi (35.13/km^{2})
- Time zone: UTC-7 (Mountain (MST))
  - Summer (DST): UTC-6 (MDT)
- ZIP code: 87004
- Area code: 505
- FIPS code: 35-70250
- GNIS feature ID: 0928811
- Website: santaana-nsn.gov

Santa Ana Pueblo (Eastern Keres: Tamaya [tʰɑmɑjːɑ]) is a settlement in Sandoval County, New Mexico, United States, of Native Americans who speak an eastern dialect of the Keresan languages. For statistical purposes, the United States Census Bureau has defined this community as a census-designated place (CDP). As of the 2000 census, the CDP had a total population of 479. It is part of the Albuquerque metropolitan area. The Pueblo, named Tamaya in Keres, administers a total reservation land of 73,000 acres (295 km^{2}) in the Rio Grande valley.

The pueblo celebrates an annual feast day for its patron saint, St. Anne, on July 26.

== Geography ==
According to the United States Census Bureau, the CDP has a total area of 7.4 square miles (19.3 km^{2}), of which 6.9 square miles (17.9 km^{2}) is land and 0.5 square miles (1.4 km^{2}) (7.11%) is water.

== Demographics ==
Historical population
Census	Pop.	Note	%±
2020	673		—
U.S. Decennial Census

As of the census of 2000, there were 479 people, 121 households, and 99 families residing in the CDP. The population density was 69.2 inhabitants per square mile (26.7/km^{2}). There were 132 housing units at an average density of 19.1 per square mile (7.4/km^{2}). The racial makeup of the CDP was 1.25% White, 97.29% Native American, 0.84% from other races, and 0.63% from two or more races. 2.51% of the population were Hispanic or Latino of any race.

There were 121 households, out of which 43.0% had children under the age of 18 living with them, 41.3% were married couples living together, 31.4% had a female householder with no husband present, and 17.4% were non-families. 14.9% of all households were made up of individuals, and 5.0% had someone living alone who was 65 years of age or older. The average household size was 3.96 and the average family size was 4.42.

In the CDP, the population was spread out, with 34.9% under the age of 18, 11.5% from 18 to 24, 26.7% from 25 to 44, 17.7% from 45 to 64, and 9.2% who were 65 years of age or older. The median age was 28 years. For every 100 females, there were 88.6 males. For every 100 females age 18 and over, there were 73.3 males.

The median income for a household in the CDP was $45,179, and the median income for a family was $45,714. Males had a median income of $22,188 versus $23,125 for females. The per capita income for the CDP was $9,857. 5.1% of the population and 4.1% of families were below the poverty line, including 4.1% of those under the age of 18 and 5.3% of those 65 and older.

== Government ==
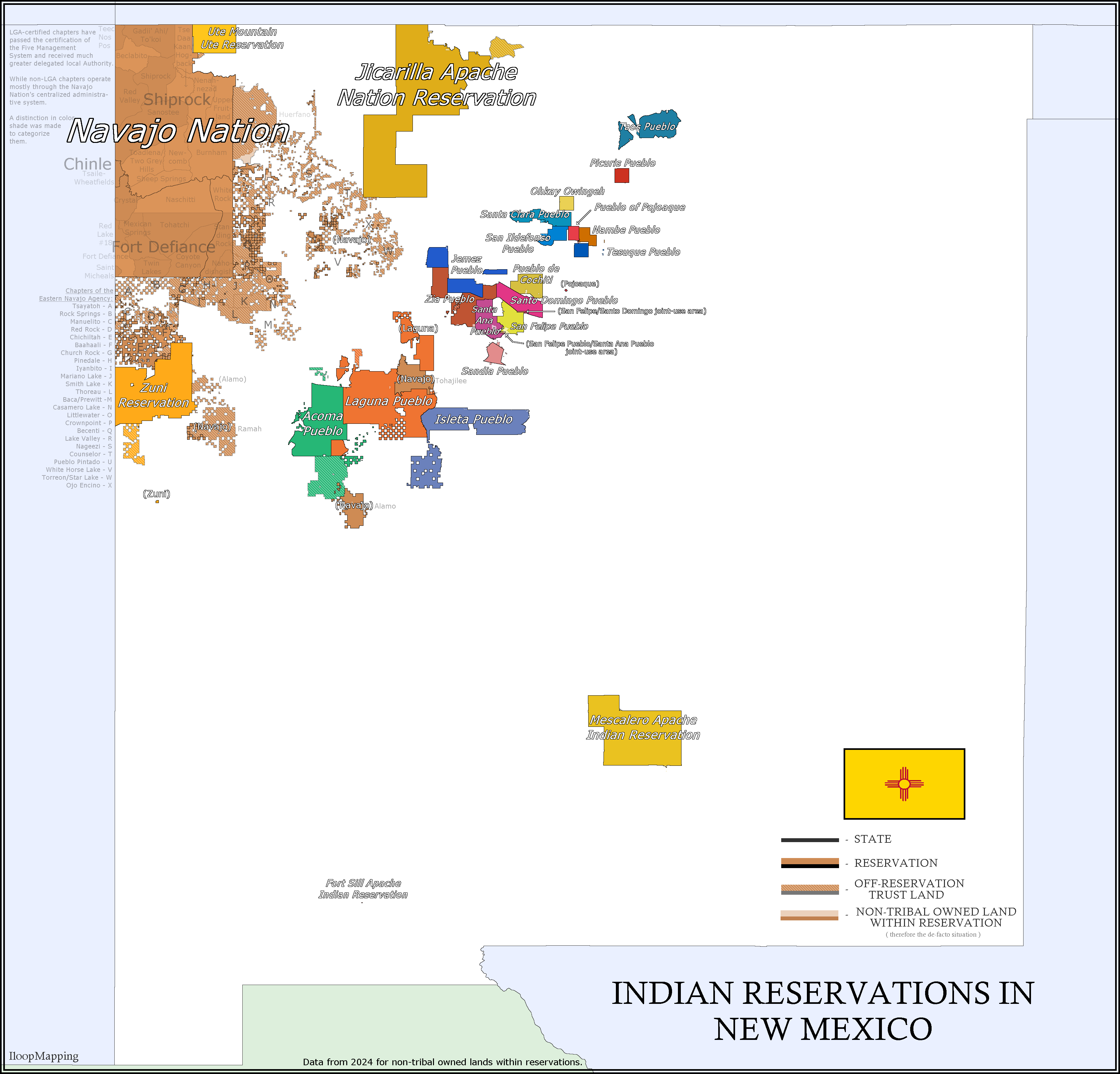
Map of the Santa Ana and neighboring tribes (In magenta).

The administration of the Pueblo of Laguna in 2025 is:

- Governor: Myron Armijo
- Lieutenant Governor: Kevin Montoya

== Economy ==
The people of Santa Ana Pueblo participate in a mixed economy, with many traveling to jobs outside of the Pueblo lands.

The Pueblo operates the Santa Ana Star Casino and is the site of the Hyatt Regency Tamaya Resort & Spa. The Pueblo owns and operates two championship golf courses, Santa Ana Golf Club and Twin Warriors Golf Club. They also run arts and crafts, gardening and cooking enterprises.

In 2022, Tesla leased Santa Ana tribal land to build a new service and delivery center, something that they cannot do on non-Federal-jurisdiction land in the state due to New Mexico legislation requiring the use of automobile dealers as intermediaries in selling cars to consumers, something Tesla has been unwilling to do. The store opened in 2023 and is five times larger than the first New Mexico Tesla facility on tribal land, a 7,000 sq ft (650 m^{2}) service center built the previous year in Nambe.

== Education ==
Most of Santa Ana Pueblo is in the Bernalillo Public Schools district. Some is in the Jemez Valley Public Schools district. The former operates Bernalillo Middle School (the zoned middle school of the Bernalillo portion of this community), and Bernalillo High School.
