= San Felipe Pueblo Elementary School =

School in New Mexico

Coordinates: 35°24′16″N 106°26′5″W

San Felipe Pueblo Elementary School (SFPES), also known as San Felipe Pueblo Day School, is a Bureau of Indian Education-operated school in San Felipe Pueblo, New Mexico. It is a K-8 school.

It has a laboratory for education in aeronautics fields that was established by NASA; as of 2003 it is the only such laboratory in any American elementary school.

== Facilities ==
In the 1990s an educator who assisted various New Mexican schools with mathematics and science programs suggested to NASA that they establish an educational laboratory at San Felipe Pueblo. In 1999 the agency offered to build one on the condition that the community do fundraising to where it could generate $200,000. The laboratory was dedicated in 2002.

== Curriculum ==
The Comprehensive School Mathematics Program (CSMP), in 1979, became a part of the curriculum at the school.
