= Peña Blanca, New Mexico =

Peña Blanca, New Mexico Kwésrte Háʼasrtetrạ (Eastern Keres)
- CDP
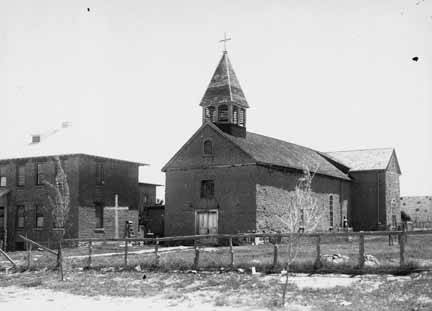
- Church at Peña Blanca, 1915. Photo by Carlos Vierra
- Nickname: Peña
- Location of Peña Blanca, New Mexico
- Coordinates: 35°34′23″N 106°20′14″W
- Country: United States
- State: New Mexico
- County: Sandoval

Area
  - Total: 6.89 sq mi (17.84 km^{2})
  - Land: 6.89 sq mi (17.84 km^{2})
  - Water: 0 sq mi (0.00 km^{2})
- Elevation: 5,236 ft (1,596 m)

Population (2020)
  - Total: 624
  - Density: 90.6/sq mi (34.98/km^{2})
- Time zone: UTC-7 (Mountain (MST))
  - Summer (DST): UTC-6 (MDT)
- ZIP code: 87041
- Area code: 505
- FIPS code: 35-55830
- GNIS feature ID: 0928768

Peña Blanca (Eastern Keres: Kwésrte Háʼasrtetrạ) is a census-designated place (CDP) in Sandoval County, New Mexico. As of the 2020 census, Peña Blanca had a population of 624. It is part of the Albuquerque Metropolitan Statistical Area.

Peña Blanca's name is derived from the Spanish term for "white rock". Its Keres name means "south town", describing its position relative Cochiti Pueblo.

== Geography ==
Peña Blanca is located at 35°34′23″N 106°20′14″W (35.573078, -106.337361).

According to the United States Census Bureau, the CDP has a total area of 6.8 square miles (18 km^{2}), all land.

== Demographics ==
Historical population
Census	Pop.	Note	%±
2020	624		—
U.S. Decennial Census

As of the census of 2000, there were 661 people, 226 households, and 169 families residing in the CDP. The population density was 97.4 inhabitants per square mile (37.6/km^{2}). There were 262 housing units at an average density of 38.6 per square mile (14.9/km^{2}). The racial makeup of the CDP was 26.63% White, 0.91% African American, 5.60% Native American, 0.15% Pacific Islander, 63.24% from other races, and 3.48% from two or more races. Hispanic or Latino of any race were 79.43% of the population.

There were 226 households, out of which 38.5% had children under the age of 18 living with them, 54.4% were married couples living together, 10.2% had a female householder with no husband present, and 25.2% were non-families. 16.8% of all households were made up of individuals, and 7.5% had someone living alone who was 65 years of age or older. The average household size was 2.92 and the average family size was 3.33.

In the CDP, the population was spread out, with 29.7% under the age of 18, 10.4% from 18 to 24, 28.3% from 25 to 44, 21.9% from 45 to 64, and 9.7% who were 65 years of age or older. The median age was 33 years. For every 100 females there were 99.7 males. For every 100 females age 18 and over, there were 94.6 males.

The median income for a household in the CDP was $24,063, and the median income for a family was $28,214. Males had a median income of $19,732 versus $24,583 for females. The per capita income for the CDP was $15,401. About 25.3% of families and 27.0% of the population were below the poverty line, including 30.8% of those under age 18 and 13.0% of those age 65 or over.

== Education ==
Peña Blanca in the Bernalillo Public Schools district, which operates Cochiti Elementary & Middle Schools in Peña Blanca, and Bernalillo High School.

== Notable people ==
- Joseph Montoya, politician
- Francine Irving Neff, 34th treasurer of the United States
