= La Madera, Sandoval County, New Mexico =

La Madera, New Mexico
- Census-designated place
- Location within New Mexico Location within the United States
- Coordinates: 35°13′22″N 106°22′13″W
- Country: United States
- State: New Mexico
- County: Sandoval

Area
  - Total: 13.09 sq mi (33.91 km^{2})
  - Land: 13.09 sq mi (33.91 km^{2})
  - Water: 0 sq mi (0.00 km^{2})
- Elevation: 6,942 ft (2,116 m)

Population (2020)
  - Total: 729
  - Density: 56/sq mi (21.5/km^{2})
- Time zone: UTC-7 (Mountain (MST))
  - Summer (DST): UTC-6 (MDT)
- ZIP Code: 87047 (Sandia Park)
- Area code: 505
- FIPS code: 35-38540
- GNIS feature ID: 2812757

La Madera is an unincorporated community and census-designated place (CDP) in Sandoval County, New Mexico, United States. It was first listed as a CDP prior to the 2020 census.

The CDP is in the southeast corner of the county, bordered to the south by Paa-Ko and Edgewood, both in Bernalillo County. The community sits at the eastern base of the Sandia Mountains, which rise to the west 4 miles (6 km) to the summit of Sandia Crest, elevation 10,678 feet (3,255 m).

== Demographics ==
Historical population
Census	Pop.	Note	%±
2020	729		—
U.S. Decennial Census

== Education ==
It is in the Bernalillo Public Schools district, which operates Bernalillo High School.
