= Placitas, Sandoval County, New Mexico =

Placitas, New Mexico
- CDP
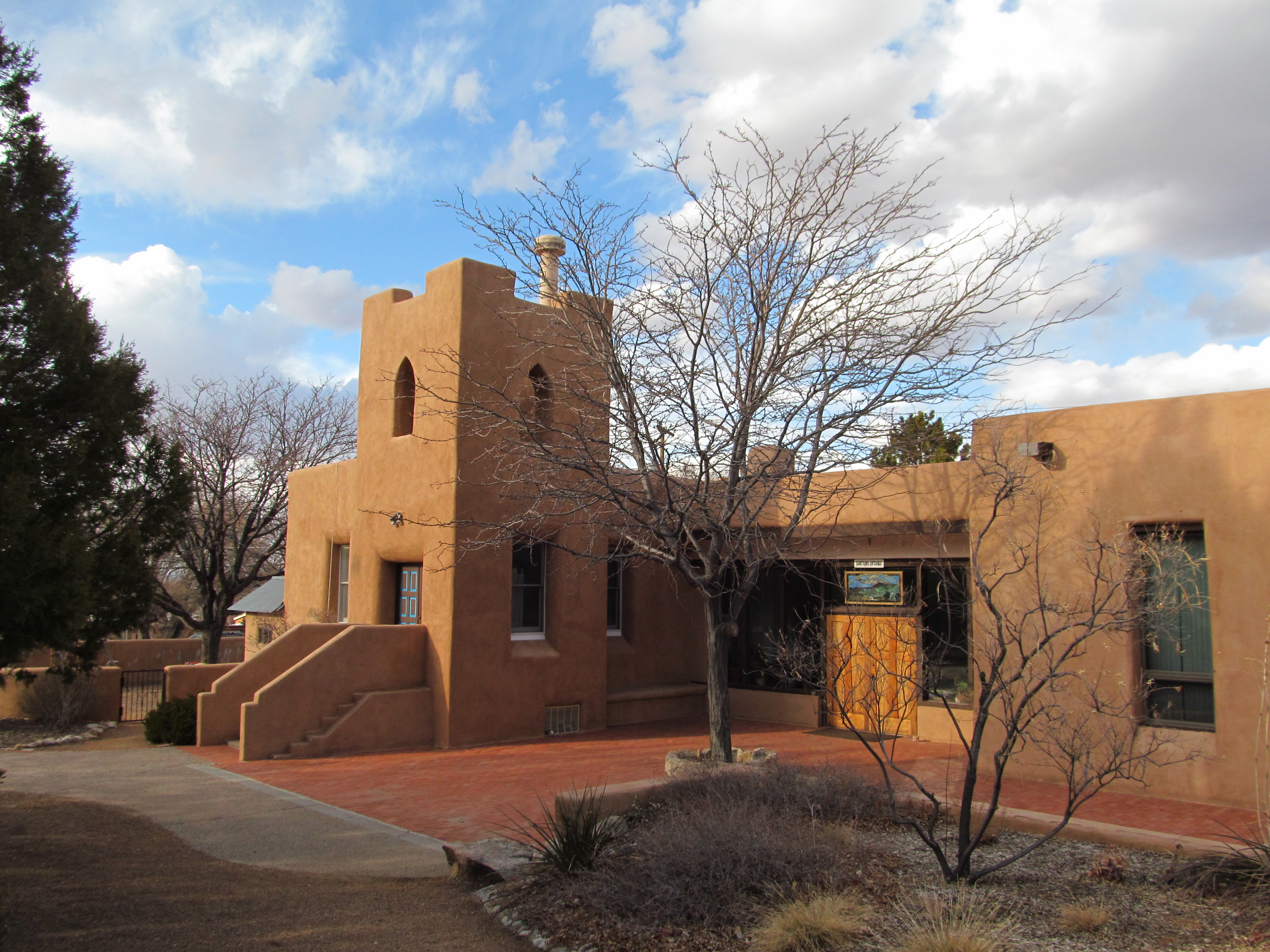
- Las Placitas Presbyterian Church

- Location of Placitas, New Mexico

- Location in the United States
- Coordinates: 35°19′3″N 106°27′7″W
- Country: United States
- State: New Mexico
- County: Sandoval

Area
  - Total: 29.44 sq mi (76.25 km^{2})
  - Land: 29.44 sq mi (76.25 km^{2})
  - Water: 0 sq mi (0.00 km^{2})
- Elevation: 5,955 ft (1,815 m)

Population (2020)
  - Total: 5,041
  - Density: 171.2/sq mi (66.11/km^{2})
- Time zone: UTC-7 (Mountain (MST))
  - Summer (DST): UTC-6 (MDT)
- ZIP code: 87043
- Area code: 505
- FIPS code: 35-58070
- GNIS feature ID: 0915877

Placitas is a census-designated place (CDP) in Sandoval County, New Mexico, United States. As of the 2010 census, its population was 4,977. It is part of the Albuquerque Metropolitan Statistical Area.

== History ==
In 1767, 21 families received a land grant from Spain. They founded the village of San Jose de las Huertas near present-day Placitas. Around the year 1768, nomadic Native Americans raided the village. In the 1830s, Placitas, which at the time was known as Las Placitas, was settled. On February 24, 1894, Las Placitas Presbyterian Church was founded.

During the 1960s and 1970s, there were many hippie settlements near Placitas. These settlements include Sun Farm, Lower Farm, Little Farm, Dome Valley, and Tawapa. The only one of these settlements that still exists today is Sun Farm.

== Geography ==
Placitas is located at 35°19′3″N 106°27′7″W (35.317444, -106.452065).

According to the United States Census Bureau, the CDP has a total area of 29.7 square miles (77 km^{2}), all land.

== Demographics ==
Historical population
Census	Pop.	Note	%±
2020	5,041		—
U.S. Decennial Census

At the 2000 census there were 3,452 people, 1,485 households, and 1,101 families in the CDP. The population density was 115.4 inhabitants per square mile (44.6/km^{2}). There were 1,606 housing units at an average density of 53.7 per square mile (20.7/km^{2}). The racial makeup of the CDP was 83.52% White, 0.70% African American, 1.30% Native American, 0.52% Asian, 0.03% Pacific Islander, 10.46% from other races, and 3.48% from two or more races. Hispanic or Latino of any race were 20.22%.

Of the 1,485 households 23.5% had children under the age of 18 living with them, 67.0% were married couples living together, 5.2% had a female householder with no husband present, and 25.8% were non-families. 20.1% of households were one person and 4.8% were one person aged 65 or older. The average household size was 2.32 and the average family size was 2.66.

The age distribution was 18.8% under the age of 18, 3.0% from 18 to 24, 25.1% from 25 to 44, 42.5% from 45 to 64, and 10.5% 65 or older. The median age was 46 years. For every 100 females, there were 92.8 males. For every 100 females age 18 and over, there were 93.8 males.

The median household income was $60,597 and the median family income was $71,696. Males had a median income of $46,667 versus $41,914 for females. The per capita income for the CDP was $36,243. About 2.6% of families and 7.0% of the population were below the poverty line, including 12.7% of those under age 18 and 3.8% of those age 65 or over.

== Education ==
Placitas is in the Bernalillo Public Schools district, which operates Placitas Elementary School, Bernalillo Middle School (the zoned middle school of this community), and Bernalillo High School.
