= Bernalillo High School =

Coordinates: 35°19′16″N 106°32′26″W

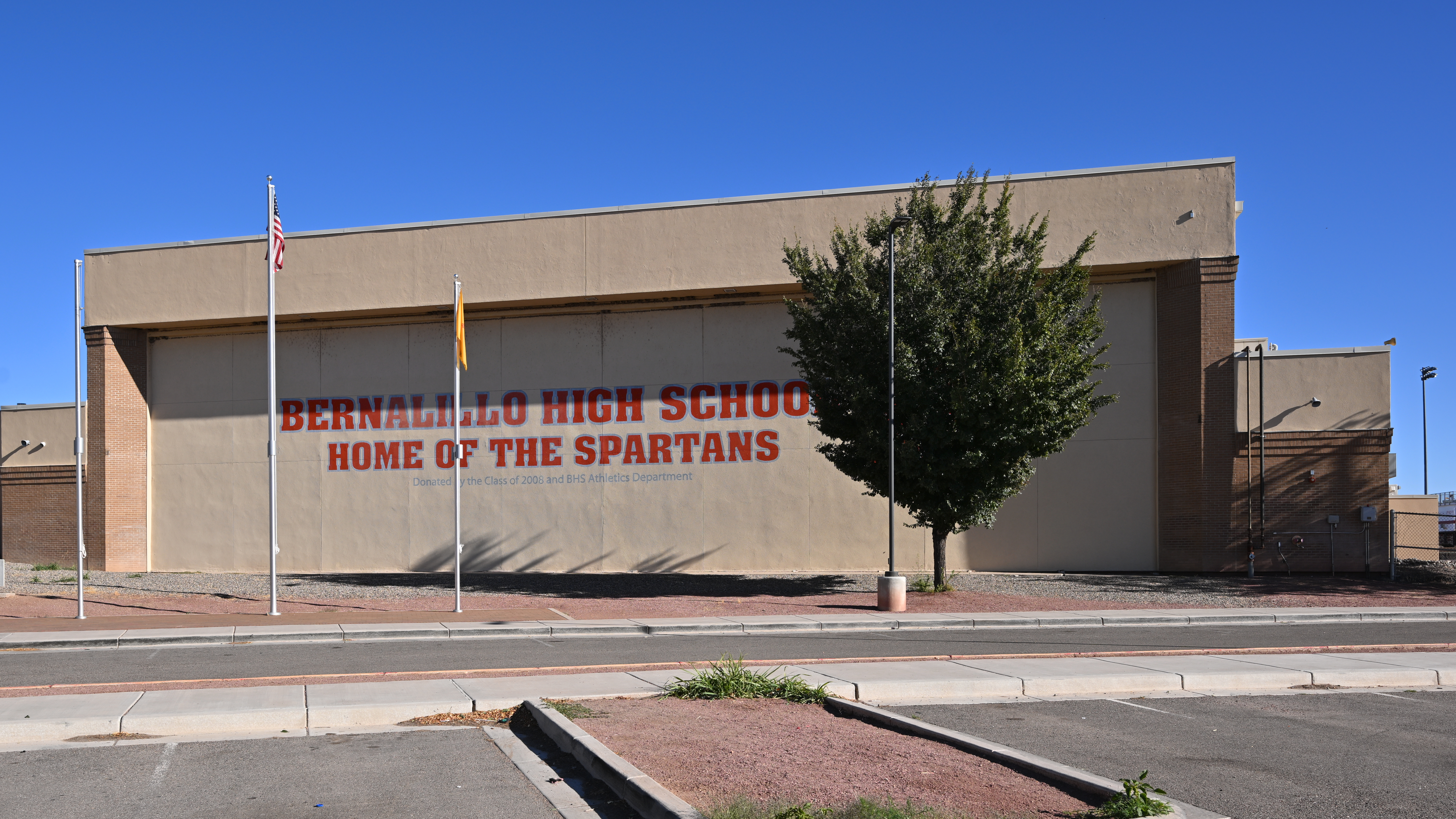

Location
- 250 Isidro Sanchez Road. Bernalillo, New Mexico 87004; United States

Information
- School type: Public, high school
- Motto: Excellence is the Standard
- Founded: 1952
- School district: Bernalillo Public Schools
- Principal: Alyssa Sanchez-Padilla
- Staff: 50.99 (FTE)
- Enrollment: 856 (2023–2024)
- Student to teacher ratio: 16.79
- Campus: Suburban
- Colors: Red & Silver
- Athletics conference: NMAA - 2AAAA League
- Mascot: Spartan
- Team name: Spartans
- Website: https://www.bernalillo-schools.org/o/bhs

Bernalillo High School is a public high school in Bernalillo, New Mexico, United States. The school is a part of the Bernalillo Public Schools district and is the only high school in the district. The mascot is the Spartan.

== Service area ==
The service area of its school district, and therefore the high school itself, includes most of Bernalillo as well as Algodones, Cochiti, Cochiti Lake, La Madera, Peña Blanca, Placitas, Pueblo of Sandia Village, San Felipe Pueblo, Santo Domingo Pueblo, and most of Santa Ana Pueblo.

== Athletics ==
Bernalillo High School competes in District 2-AAAA.

In 2023, the high school posthumously honored Benny Shendo Sr. who won the state mile with a time of 4.44 (for all schools, regardless of size) in 1953, becoming the first state champion for Bernalillo High, with an honorary diploma. The spring after his championship, Benny's grandfather died, requiring Benny to leave school to help run the family farm. He was then drafted to serve in the Korean War and never finished his diploma.
