= Keres language =

Language isolate of New Mexico, United States

Keresan
- Native to: United States
- Region: New Mexico
- Ethnicity: Keres
- Native speakers: 13,190 (2013)
- Language family: Language isolate or Keresan
- Dialects: East Keres; West Keres

Language codes
- ISO 639-3: Either: kee – Eastern kjq – Western
- Glottolog: kere1287
- ELP: Acoma-Laguna; Rio Grande Keresan
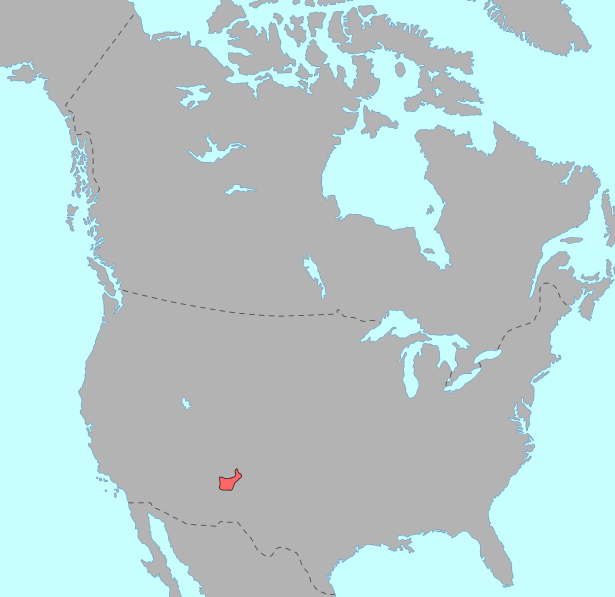
- Pre-contact distribution of Keresan languages

- Acoma–Laguna and Rio Grande Keresan are classified as Definitely Endangered by the UNESCO Atlas of the World's Languages in Danger.

Keres (/ˈkeɪreɪs/), also Keresan (/ˈkɛrəsən/), is a Native American language, spoken by the Keres Pueblo people in New Mexico. Depending on the analysis, Keres is considered a small language family or a language isolate with several dialects. If it is considered a language isolate, it would be the most widely spoken language isolate within the borders of the United States. The varieties of each of the seven Keres pueblos are mutually intelligible with its closest neighbors. There are significant differences between the Western and Eastern groups, which are sometimes counted as separate languages.

== Classification ==
Keres is now considered a language isolate. In the past, Edward Sapir grouped it together with a Hokan–Siouan stock. Morris Swadesh suggested a connection with Wichita. Joseph Greenberg grouped Keres with Siouan, Yuchi, Caddoan, and Iroquoian in a superstock called Keresiouan. None of these proposals has been validated by subsequent linguistic research.

=== Internal classification ===
In 2013, there was an estimate total of 13,190 speakers.

- Keres
  - Eastern Keres: total of 4,580 speakers (1990 census)
    - Cochiti Pueblo Kotyit dialect: 600 speakers (2007)
    - San Felipe Pueblo Katishtya dialect: 2,340 speakers (2007)
    - Kewa Pueblo (formally Santo Domingo Pueblo) Kewa dialect: 2,850 speakers (2007)
    - Zia Pueblo Ts'ia dialect: 500 speakers (2007)
    - Santa Ana Pueblo Tamaiya dialect: 390 speakers (2007)
  - Western Keres: total of 3,391 speakers (1990 census)
    - Acoma Pueblo Áakʼu dialect: 1,930 speakers (2007)
    - Laguna Pueblo Kawaika dialect: 2,060 speakers (2007)

== Phonology ==
Keresan has around 40 consonant phonemes, and around 12 vowel phonemes. Based on the classification in the World Atlas of Language Structures, Keres is a language with a large consonant inventory.

The great number of consonants relates to the three-way distinction between voiceless, aspirated and ejective consonants (e.g. /t tʰ tʼ/), and to the larger than average number of fricatives (i.e. /s sʼ ʂ ʂʼ ʃ ʃʼ h/) and affricates, the latter also showing the three-way distinction found in stops.

The large number of vowels derives from a distinction made between long and short vowels (e.g. /e eː/), as well as from the presence of tones and voicelessness. Thus, a single vowel quality may occur with seven distinct realizations: /é è e̥ éː èː êː ěː/, all of which are used to distinguish words in the language.

=== Consonants ===
The chart below contains the consonants of the proto-Keresan (or pre-Keresan) from Miller & Davis (1963) based on a comparison of Acoma, Santa Ana, and Santo Domingo, as well as other features of the dialects compiled from The Language of Santa Ana Pueblo (1964), Kansas Working Papers in Linguistics (1987), and The Phonemes of Keresan (1946), and the Grammar of Laguna Keres (2005).

		Labial	Alveolar		Palatal (-alveolar)		Retroflex	Velar	Glottal
		Labial	plain	sib./nasal	plain	sib./nasal	Retroflex	Velar	Glottal
Plosive/ Affricate	tenuis	p	t	ts	c	tʃ	tʂ	k	ʔ
Plosive/ Affricate	aspirated	pʰ	tʰ	tsʰ	cʰ	tʃʰ	tʂʰ	kʰ	
Plosive/ Affricate	ejective	pʼ	tʼ	tsʼ	cʼ	tʃʼ	tʂʼ	kʼ	
Fricative	tenuis			s		ʃ	ʂ		h
Fricative	ejective			sʼ		ʃʼ	ʂʼ		
Sonorant	plain	m	ɾ	n	j	ɲ		w	
Sonorant	glottalic	mˀ	ɾˀ	nˀ	jˀ	ɲˀ		wˀ	

=== Vowels ===
Keresan vowels have a phonemic distinction in duration: all vowels can be long or short. Additionally, short vowels can also be voiceless. The vowel chart below contains the vowel phonemes and allophones from the information of the Keresan languages combined from The Language of Santa Ana Pueblo (1964), The Phonemes of Keresan (1946), and Kansas Working Papers in Linguistics (1987).

	Long		Short		
	Phonemic	Phonetic	Phonemic	Phonetic	Voiceless
Close	/iː/	[i]	/i/	[i ɪ]	[ɪ̥]
Mid-front	/eː/	[eː]	/e/	[e ɛ æ]	[e̥]
Mid-central	/ɨː/	[əː ɨː]	/ɨ/	[ə ɨ ɤ]	[ɨ̥]
Open	/ɑː/	[aː ɑː]	/ɑ/	[a ɑ]	[ḁ]
Back-close	/oː/	[oː]	/o/	[o]	[o̥]
Back-close	/uː/	[uː]	/u/	[u ʊ o]	[ʊ̥]

Notes:

- Western Keres does not have phonemic /oː/ or /o/, though both vowels may occur phonetically. Eastern Keres words containing /o/ show /au/ in Western Keres. For instance, the first vowel in the word-sentence Sraúka̠cha̠ – "I see you":
  - Kotyit Keres: [ʂóːkʰɑ̥tʃʰɑ̥]
  - Kʼawaika Keres: [ʂɑ̌ukʰɑ̥tʃʰɑ̥]

==== Voiceless vowels ====
All Keresan short vowels may be devoiced in certain positions. The phonemic status of these vowels is controversial. Maring (1967) considers them to be phonemes of Áákʼu Keres, whereas other authors disagree. There are phonetic grounds for vowel devoicing based on the environment they occur, for instance word-finally, but there are also exceptions. Vowels in final position are nearly always voiceless and medial vowels occurring between voiced consonants, after nasals and ejectives are nearly always voiced.

- Word-final devoicing: [pɑ̌ːkʊ̥] because
- Word-medial devoicing: [ʔìpʰi̥ʃɑ́] white paint

=== Tones ===
Acoma Keres has four lexical tones: high, low, falling and rising. Falling and rising tones only occur in long vowels and voiceless vowels bear no tones:

Tones	examples	translation
High	[tɨ́j], [áwáʔáwá]	here, matrilineal uncle
Low	[mùːtètsá]	young boy
Rising	[pɑ̌ːkʊ̥]	because
Falling	[ʔêː], [hêːk'a]	and, whole part

=== Syllable structure ===
Most Keresan syllables take a CV(V) shape. The maximal syllable structure is CCVVC and the minimal syllable is CV. In native Keresan words, only a glottal stop /ʔ/ ⟨ʼ⟩ can close a syllable, but some loanwords from Spanish have syllables that end in a consonant, mostly a nasal (i.e. /m n/ but words containing these sequences are rare in the language).

Syllable type	examples	translation
CV	[sʼà], [ʔɪ]shv́v	I have it, left
CVV	[mùː]dedza, a[táù]shi	young boy, cooking pot
CCV	[ʃkʰí]srátsʼa	I'm not fat
CCVV	[ʃtùː]sra	bluejay
CVC	í[miʔ], [kùm]banêeru	expression of fear, workmate (Spanish "compañero")

Due to extensive vowel devoicing, several Keresan words may be perceived as ending in consonants or even containing consonant clusters.

- Word-internal cluster: yʼâakạ srûunị 'stomach' /jˀɑ̂ːkḁʂûːni/ > [jɑ̂ːkḁʂûːni] ~ [jɑ̂ːkʂûːni]
- Word-final coda: úwàakạ 'baby'; /úwɑ̀ːkḁ/ > [úwɑ̀ːkʰḁ] ~ [úwɑ̀ːkʰ]

==== Phonotactics ====
The only sequence of consonants (i.e. consonant cluster) that occurs in native Keresan words is a sequence of a fricative /ʃ ʂ/ and a stop or affricate. Clusters are restricted to beginnings of syllables (i.e. the syllable onset). When the alveolo-palatal consonant /ʃ/ occurs as C_{1}, it combines with alveolar and palatal C_{2}, whereas the retroflex alveolar /ʂ/ precedes bilabial and velar C_{2}s, which suggest a complementary distribution. Consonant clusters may occur both word-initially and word-medially.

C_{1}/C_{2}	Bilabial			Alveolar			Velar			Postalveolar		
C_{1}/C_{2}	/p/	/pʰ/	/pʼ/	/t/	/tʰ/	/tʼ/	/k/	/kʰ/	/kʼ/	/tʃ/	/tʃʰ/	/tʃʼ/
/ʃ/				/ʃtáʊ̯rákʊ̥/ shdáurákụ 'frog, toad'	/ʃtʰéràʃtʼíká/ shtérashtʼígá 'cricket'	/ʃtʼìcɑ̀ːtʰɪ̥ʃɪ̥/ shtʼidyàatịshị 'plot of land'				/ʃtʃɨ/ shjv 'upward'	/ʃtʃʰúmúná/ shchúmúmá 'wasp'	/ʃtʃʼísḁ/ shchʼísạ 'six'
/ʂ/	/ʂpúːná/ srbúuná 'water jug'	/ʂpʰɑ̀ːtʼi/ srpàat'i 'mockingbird'	/ʂpʼeruru/ srpʼeruru 'it's full'				/ʂkɑ́ʂkɑ́ʊ̯kʼa/ srgásrgáukʼa 'quail'	/ʂkʰɨ́tútsʰɪ̥/ srkv́dútsị 'mound, hill'	/ʂkʼàpɪ́hɪ́/ srkʼabíhí 'female in-law'			

== Orthography ==
Traditional Keresan beliefs postulate that Keres is a sacred language that must exist only in its spoken form. The language's religious connotation and years of persecution of Pueblo religion by European colonizers may also explain why no unified orthographic convention exists for Keresan. However, a practical spelling system has been developed for Laguna (Kʼawaika) and more recently for Acoma (Áakʼu) Keres, both of which are remarkably consistent.

In the Keres spelling system, each symbol represents a single phoneme. The letters ⟨c q z f⟩ and sometimes also ⟨v⟩ are not used. Digraphs represent both palatal consonants (written using a sequence of C and ⟨y⟩), and retroflex consonants, which are represented using a sequence of C and the letter ⟨r⟩. These graphemes used for writing Western Keres are shown between ⟨...⟩ below.

=== Consonant symbols ===
		Labial	Alveolar	Palatal	Retroflex	Velar	Glottal
Nasal	voiced	⟨m⟩	⟨n⟩	⟨ny⟩			
Nasal	glottalized	⟨mʼ⟩	⟨nʼ⟩	⟨nyʼ⟩			
Plosive	voiceless	⟨b⟩	⟨d⟩	⟨dy⟩		⟨g⟩	⟨ʼ⟩
Plosive	aspirated	⟨p⟩	⟨t⟩	⟨ty⟩		⟨k⟩	
Plosive	ejective	⟨pʼ⟩	⟨tʼ⟩	⟨tyʼ⟩		⟨kʼ⟩	
Affricate	voiceless		⟨dz⟩	⟨j⟩	⟨dr⟩		
Affricate	aspirated		⟨ts⟩	⟨ch⟩	⟨tr⟩		
Affricate	ejective		⟨tsʼ⟩	⟨chʼ⟩	⟨trʼ⟩		
Fricative	voiceless		⟨s⟩	⟨sh⟩	⟨sr⟩		⟨h⟩
Fricative	ejective		⟨sʼ⟩	⟨shʼ⟩	⟨srʼ⟩		
Approximant	voiced	⟨w⟩	⟨r⟩	⟨y⟩			
Approximant	glottalized	⟨wʼ⟩	⟨rʼ⟩	⟨yʼ⟩			

==== Signage at Acoma Pueblo ====
Signs at Acoma Pueblo sometimes use special diacritics for ejective consonants that differ from the symbols above, as shown in the table:

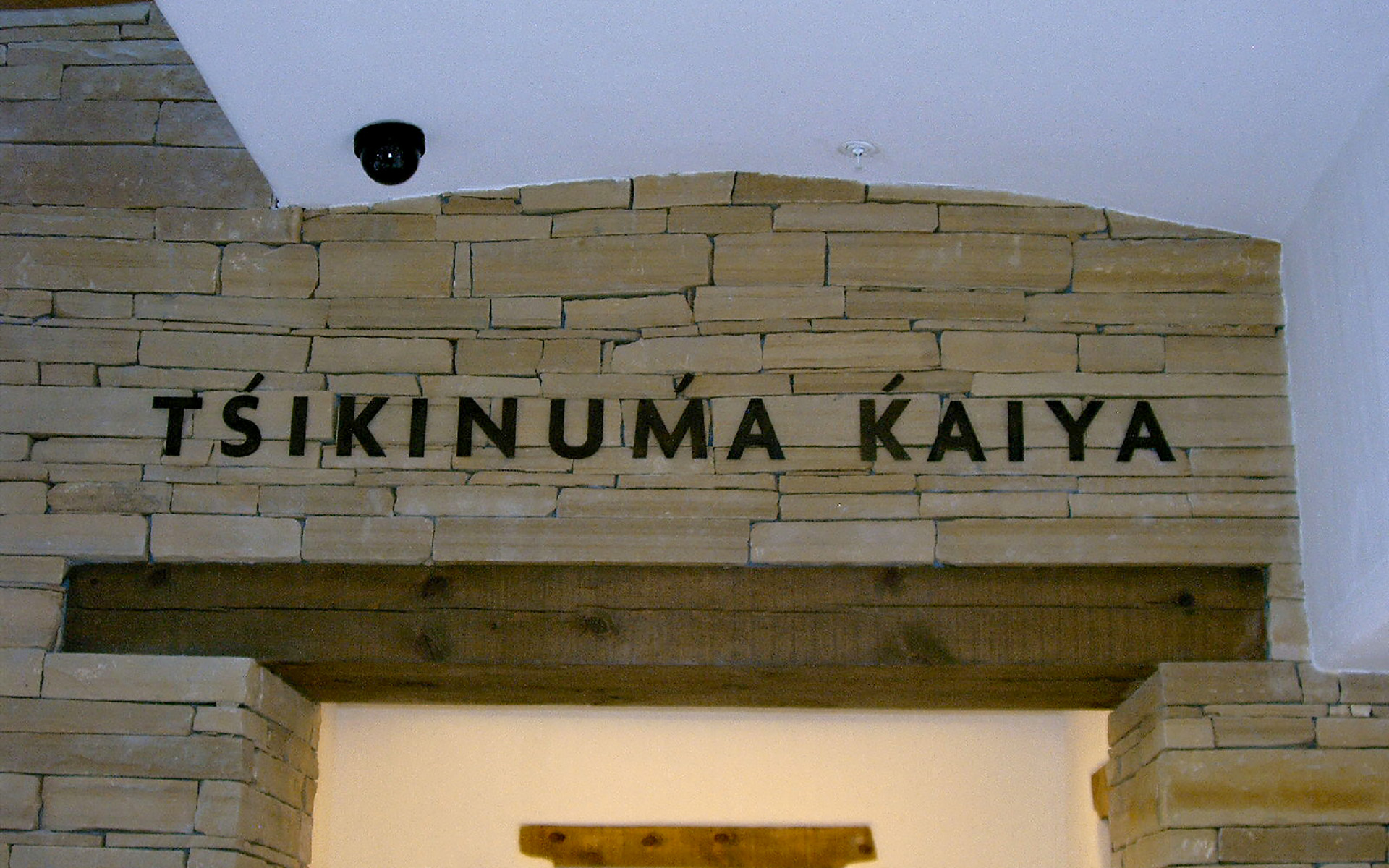
Signage at Acoma Pueblo

Comparison between general orthography and the orthography used at Acoma
General	⟨pʼ⟩	⟨tʼ⟩	⟨kʼ⟩	⟨sʼ⟩	⟨tsʼ⟩	⟨mʼ⟩	⟨wʼ⟩	⟨yʼ⟩	⟨nʼ shʼ srʼ tyʼ⟩
Acoma signage	⟨ṕ⟩	⟨t́⟩	⟨ḱ⟩	⟨ś⟩	⟨tś⟩	⟨ḿ⟩	⟨ẃ⟩	⟨ý⟩	?

=== Vowel symbols ===
Vowel sounds are represented straightforwardly in the existing spellings for Keresan. Each vowel sound is written using a unique letter or digraph (for long vowels and diphthongs). However, there are two competing representations for the vowel /ɨ/. Some versions simply use the IPA ⟨ɨ⟩ whereas others use the letter ⟨v⟩ (the sound /v/ as in veal does not occur in Keresan). Voiceless vowels have also been represented in two ways; either underlined or with a dot below (see table).

Long vowels		Short vowels		Voiceless vowels	
Phoneme	Grapheme	Phoneme	Grapheme	Phoneme	Grapheme
/iː/	⟨ii⟩	/i/	⟨i⟩	/ɪ̥/	⟨i̱⟩ or ⟨ị⟩
/eː/	⟨ee⟩	/e/	⟨e⟩	/e̥/	⟨e̱⟩ or ⟨ẹ⟩
/ɨː/	⟨ɨɨ⟩ or ⟨vv⟩	/ɨ/	⟨ɨ⟩ or ⟨v⟩	/ɨ̥/	⟨ɨ̱⟩ or ⟨ṿ⟩
/ɑː/	⟨aa⟩	/ɑ/	⟨a⟩	/ḁ/	⟨a̱⟩ or ⟨ạ⟩
/oː/	⟨oo⟩	/o/	⟨o⟩	/o̥/	⟨o̱⟩ or ⟨ọ⟩
/uː/	⟨uu⟩	/u/	⟨u⟩	/ʊ̥/	⟨u̱⟩ or ⟨ụ⟩

==== Diacritics for tone ====
Tone may or may not be represented in the orthography of Keresan. When represented, four diacritics may be used above the vowel. Unlike the system used for Navajo, diacritics for tone are not repeated in long vowels.

	High tone	Low tone	Rising tone	Falling tone
Long Vowel	⟨áa⟩, ⟨úu⟩	⟨àa⟩, ⟨ùu⟩ or unmarked	⟨ǎa⟩, ⟨ǔu⟩ or ⟨aá⟩, ⟨uú⟩	⟨âa⟩, ⟨ûu⟩ or ⟨aà⟩, ⟨uù⟩
Short Vowel	⟨á⟩, ⟨ú⟩	⟨à⟩, ⟨ù⟩ or unmarked	-	

=== Keres orthography and alphabetical order ===
Although Keresan is not normally written, there exists one dictionary of the language in which words are listed in any given order. In this dictionary of Western Keres, digraphs count as single letters, although ejective consonants are not listed separately; occurring after their non-ejective counterparts. The symbol for the glottal stop ⟨ʼ⟩, for long vowels (e.g. ⟨aa ee ii⟩ etc.) are not treated as separate letters.

Alphabetical order in the Acoma Keres Audio Dictionary
A a	B b	CH ch	CHʼ chʼ	D d	DR dr	DY dy	DZ dz	E e	G g	H h	I i	(Ɨ ɨ)	J j	K k	Kʼ kʼ
M m	Mʼ mʼ	N n	Nʼ nʼ	NY ny	NYʼ nyʼ	(O o)	P p	Pʼ pʼ	R r	Rʼ rʼ	S s	Sʼ sʼ	SH sh	SHʼ shʼ	SR sr
SRʼ srʼ	T tʼ	TR tr	TRʼ trʼ	TS ts	TSʼ tsʼ	TY ty	TYʼ tyʼ	U u	W w	(V v)	Wʼ wʼ	Y y	Yʼ yʼ

Letters〈f q x z〉are not used to write Keres, whereas the letters ⟨ɨ o v⟩ are only used in some dialects.

=== Sample texts ===
==== Orthography marking tone ====
Woodpecker and Coyote

⟨Ái dítʼîishu srbígà kʼánâaya dyáʼâʼu. Shʼée srbígà ái dyěitsị ái náyáa shdyɨ dyáʼa.⟩
/ ɑ́ì títʼîːʃù ʂpíkɑ̀ kʼɑ́nɑ̂ːjɑ̀ cɑ́ʔɑ̂ʔù | ʃʼéː ʂpíkɑ̀ ɑ́ì cěǐtsʰi̥ ɑ́ì nɑ́jɑ́ː ʃcɨ̀ cɑ́ʔɑ̀ /

==== Orthography without tone marking ====
Boas text

Baanaʼa, egu kauʼseeʼe, atsi sʼaama-ee srayutse.

== Morphosyntax ==
Keresan is a split-ergative language in which verbs denoting states (i.e. stative verbs) behave differently from those indexing actions, especially in terms of the person affixes they take. This system of argument marking is based on a split-intransitive pattern, in which subjects are marked differently if they are perceived as actors than from when they are perceived as undergoers of the action being described.

The morphology of Keresan is mostly prefixing, although suffixes and reduplication also occur. Keresan distinguishes nouns, verbs, numerals and particles as word classes. Nouns in Keresan do not normally distinguish case or number, but they can be inflected for possession, with distinct constructions for alienable and inalienable possession. Other than possession, Keresan nouns show no comprehensive noun classes.

=== Word order ===
Keresan is a verb-final language, though word order is rather flexible.

John Bill gukacha
J. B. g-Ø-ukacha
John Bill 3S-3S-see
subject object verb
'John saw Bill.'

==== Negation ====
Negation is doubly marked in Keresan. In addition to the adverb dzaadi, verbs index negation through a suffix (e.g. -u).

- Gukacha 'S/he saw her/him'
- Dzaadi gukachau 'S/he didn't see her/him'

=== Verbal morphology ===
The verb is a central grammatical category in Keres, conveying the most information about events in communicative acts. Through its morphemes, Keresan verbs code not only person and number of the initiator of the action (e.g. "Tammy drinks decaf") as is common in Indo-European languages, but also how the initiator is implicated in the action. For instance, the three verbs that describe Tammy's actions in "Tammy kicked the ball" vs. "Tammy jumped" vs. "Tammy sneezed" require different levels of effort from Tammy, that is when kicking vs. jumping vs. sneezing.

Additionally, the person and number of the undergoer of the action are all coded on the verb (e.g. the word gukacha means "S/he sees her/him", a full sentence in English). The ways the speaker assesses the action (i.e. evidentiality, as in "I think Tammy arrived from class" vs. "Tammy arrived from class"). Finally, the internal temporal structure of the action (i.e. aspect, as in "Tammy was sneezing in class" vs. "Tammy sneezed in class") is also coded in Keresan verbs.

According to Maring (1967), the Keresan verb is organized around the following grammatical categories (pp. 39–40)

- Subject/Object relations
  - Subject of intransitive verbs: marked by a prefix that distinguishes 3-4 persons in the singular (see below).
  - Subject of transitive verbs: marked by a prefix that distinguishes 3-4 persons in the singular (see below).
  - Object of transitive verbs: marked by a prefix that combines with the subject prefix, or by a suffix
- Number relations
  - Singular: usually marked by a prefix
  - Dual: can be marked by a prefix, partial reduplication or by suffixes
  - Plural: can be marked by a prefix, partial reduplication, by suffixes or by suppletive stem forms (i.e. singular and plural forms are not related etymologically)
- Temporal relations
  - Future: is marked on the verb by a series of prefixes that also encode number
- Modality relations
  - Indicative
  - Dubitative
  - Hortative
    - Negative hortative
  - Negative
    - Future negative
- Voice relations
  - Active
  - Passive
  - Reflexive
  - Reciprocal
- Aspect
  - Imperfective
  - Inceptive
  - Repetitive
  - Continuative
  - Habitual
  - Inchoative
  - Perfective

==== The verbal prefix ====
In Keres, the verbal prefix carries information from five different grammatical categories: argument role, modality, polarity, person and number. That is, a single Keresan verb prefix codes who initiated the action and how implicated that entity is (the subject/case), who underwent the effects of the action (the direct object), the speaker's assessment of the action (the modality) and whether it occurred or not (polarity). On the other hand, information about when the action took place (i.e. tense) is expressed elsewhere in a clause, mostly by adverbs.

===== Number =====
Keresan verbs distinguish three numbers: singular, dual (two entities) and plural (more than two entities); and four persons: first (the speaker), second (the hearer), third (a known, definite or salient entity being talked about) and fourth (a non-salient, unknown or indefinite entity being talked about, also known as obviative) persons. The plural and dual forms are often marked by reduplication of part of the stem (gukacha 's/he saw it' vs guʼukacha 'the two of them saw it').

===== Argument role =====
Languages encode two main types of actions: those in which the main participant initiates an action that produces change in an object (e.g. kick a ball, buy a gift, cook a dish, read a book); and those in which the action produces no (perceived) change in the world or that have no object (sneezing, breathing, growing, diving, etc.). Actions that take an object are encoded by transitive verbs, whereas those that take no object are expressed via intransitive verbs.

====== Intransitive verbs ======
In Indo-European languages like English, all intransitive verbs behave similarly ('They sneeze/breathe/dive/think'/etc.). In Keresan, actions that take no object are conceptualized in two distinct ways depending on how the initiator of the action is implicated. More active-like intransitive verbs (e.g. 'to sneeze') are coded through one set of morphemes, whereas actions conceptualized as involving the initiator at a lesser degree (e.g. 'to believe') are coded using a separate set of prefixes.

Degrees of involvement of the initiator in Keres
	Actions	Intransitive verb type
More	to write (-dyàatra), to steal as a thief (-chʼáwʼa), to have diarrhea (-ushchʼi), to leave (-mi), to whistle (-srbiitsa), to sweat (-shdyuwàanʼi)	Active
Less	to believe (-hima), to be born (-dyá), to sleep (-bái), to be afraid (-tyishu), to forget (-dyúmidruwi)	Inactive

Ideas expressed in Indo-European languages with adjectives are most often encoded by verbs in Keresan. That is, in Keresan one express the idea in the sentence 'He is selfish' by saying something along the lines of 'He selfishes'. In such "actions", the entity that is characterized by them is not implicated in the action directly (i.e. it's beyond their control), and thus belong in the Inactive intransitive category. The different sets of prefixes are shown below:

Intransitive Prefixes by Verb Type
	Active intransive			Inactive intransitive		
	Prefix	Example		Prefix	Example	
First	s(i)-	sudyàatra	I write	srk-	srkuhima	I believe
Second	sr-	srúuchʼáwʼa	you steal	kɨdr-	kɨdrâidyá	you were born
Third	k-	kashdyuwàanʼi	s/he sweats	dz-	dzíibái	he is sleeping

====== Transitive verbs ======
Transitive verb - Indicative mood (-ukạchạ 'to see')
	Direct object				
Singular
Subject		First ('me')	Second ('you')	Third ('her'/'him')	Fourth
Subject	First ('I')	-	srà-ukạchạ	sì-ukạchạ	-
Subject	First ('I')	-	I see you	I see her/him	-
Subject	Second ('you')	dyù-ukạchạ	-	srù-ukạchạ	-
Subject	Second ('you')	you see me	-	you see her/him	-
Subject	Third ('she'/'he')	srgù-ukạchạ	kudrù -ukạchạ	g-ukạchạ	gù-ukạchạ
Subject	Third ('she'/'he')	s/he sees me	s/he sees you	s/he sees her/him	s/he sees something
Subject	Fourth ('one')	-		dzì-ukạchạ	-
Subject	Fourth ('one')	-		one sees it	-

=== Aspect ===
Aspect in Keresan is signalled by suffixes.

-ajanu 'to rain'
kájáni	it rains
káajáni	it is raining
kájásɨ	it keeps raining
káajatú	it rained

=== Time (tense) adverbials ===
The category of tense is expressed in Keresan via adverbs that indicate when the action about which one is speaking took place.

Time adverbials in Acoma Keres
Past		Future	
tsikʼínuma	long ago	kúsra	tonight
háma	once, formerly	nacháma	tomorrow
súwa	yesterday	naháayashi	day after tomorrow

== Lexicon ==
New words are coined through a number of roots that are combined to pre-existing ones. Compounding is a common strategy for word building, although derivation also occurs.

=== Numerals ===
The Keresan numeral system is a base 10 system. Numerals 11–19, as well as those between the multiple of tens, are formed by adding the word kʼátsi (/ kʼátsʰɪ / 'ten') followed by the word dzidra (/tsɪtʂa/ 'more'). Numerals 20 and above are formed by adding a multiplicative adverb (-wa or -ya) to the base number and the word kʼátsi.

Western Keres
1	ísrkʼé	11	kʼátsi-írskʼá-dzidra	21	dyúya-kʼátsi-íisrkʼé-dzidra
2	dyúuwʼée	12	kʼátsi-dyú-dzidra	22	dyúya-kʼátsi-dyú-dzidra
3	chameʼée	13	kʼátsi-chami-dzidra	30	chamiya-kʼátsi
4	dyáana	14	kʼátsi-dyáana-dzidra	40	dyáanawa-kʼátsi
5	táam'a	15	kʼátsi-táamʼa-dzidra	50	táamʼawa-kʼátsi
6	shʼísa	16	kʼátsi-shchʼísa-dzidra	60	shchʼísawa-kʼátsi
7	mʼáiʼdyàana	17	kʼátsi-mʼáidyana-dzidra	70	mʼáidyanawa-kʼátsi
8	kukʼúmishu	18	kʼátsi-kukʼúmishu-dzidra	80	kukʼúmishuwa-kʼátsi
9	máyúkʼu	19	kʼátsi-máiyúkʼa-dzidra	90	máiyúkʼuwa-kʼátsi
10	kʼátsi	20	dyúwa-kʼátsi	100	kʼádzawa-kʼátsi

=== Loanwords from Spanish ===
European colonizers arriving in the Southwest US brought with them material culture and concepts that were unknown to the peoples living in the area. Words for the new ideas introduced by Spaniards were often borrowed into Keres directly from Early Modern Spanish, and a large number of these persists in Modern Keresan.

Semantic domain	Modern Western Keres	Modern Spanish	English translation
Household items	kamárîita, kuchâaru, kujûuna, méesa, mendâan, kuwêeta	camarita, cuchara, colchón, mesa, ventana, cubeta (Mexico)	bed, spoon, mattress, table, window (glass), bucket
Social structure	gumbanêerụ, rái, murâatụ, merigâanạ, kumanirá, ninêeru	compañero, rey, mulato, americano(a), comunidad, dinero	workmate, king, black person, white person, community house, money
Food	géesu, arûusị, kawé, kurántụ, mantạgîiyụ, mandêegạ	queso, arroz, café, cilantro, mantequilla, manteca	cheese, rice, coffee, cilantro, butter, lard/butter
Animal husbandry	kawâayu, kanêeru, kujíinu, kurá, dûura, wáakạshị	caballo, carnero, cochino, corral, toro, vaca	horse, sheep, pig, pen/corral, bull, cow
Religious concepts	míisa, Háasus Kuríistị, nachạwêena, guréesima	misa, Jesús Cristo, Noche Buena, Cuaresma	mass, Jesus Christ, Christmas, Lent
Days of the week	tamîikụ, rûunishị, mâatịsị, mérikụsị, sruwêewesị, yêenịsị, sâawaru	domingo, lunes, martes, miércoles, jueves, viernes, sábado	Sunday, Monday, Tuesday, Wednesday, Thursday, Friday, Saturday

== Proto-language ==
Proto-Keresan
- Reconstruction of: Keresan languages

Selected Proto-Keresan reconstructions of plants, animals, and toponyms by Miller and Davis (1963) are given below. The IPA transcription is based on the authors' description. Underlined consonants in reconstructions refer to uncertainties by the authors regarding aspiration (p. 312); these are shown as capitalized consonants in the IPA.

no.	gloss	Proto-Keresan	IPA
10	wheat	*ʔáṣánɪ	*/ʔáʂáni̥/
17	centipede	*ʔíʔìˑdʸawa	*/ʔíʔìːcàwà/
19	cholla cactus	*ʔiˑbánɪ	*/ʔiːpáni̥/
27	porcupine	*ʔiˑṣ̍á	*/ʔiːʂʼá/
45	toad	*bêˑrak̠ᴀ	*/pêːɾàKḁ/
63	turkey	*cinᴀ	*/tsʰinḁ/
64	fox	*cúsk̠ɪ	*/tsʰúsKi̥/
71	locust	*c̍íˑga	*/tsʼíːkà/
72	Zia Pueblo	*c̍íˑy̍á	*/tsʼíːjˀá/
78	kiva	*c̆ídʸá	*/tʃícá/
83	medicine man	*č̇áyâˑni	*/tʃʼájâːnì/
84	hawk	*č̇ɨ́ˑríga	*/tʃʼɨ́ːɾíka/
85	horned toad	*dabínᴜsk̠ᴀ	*/tapínu̥sKḁ/
87	Santa Ana Pueblo	*dámáyá	*/támájá/
88	squash	*dâˑni	*/tâːnì/
91	corn husk	*díˑskámí	*/tíːskʰámí/
93	dog	*díyᴀ	*/tíjḁ/
98	bobcat	*dʸáˑdʸᴜ	*/cáːcu̥/
101	deer	*dʸán̍é	*/cánˀé/
104	gourd	*dʸáˑwí	*/cáːwí/
105	piñon pine	*dʸèic̠ɪ	*/cèiTSi̥/
108	elk	*dʸɨ́ˑṣᴀ	*/cɨ́ːʂḁ/
110	badger	*dʸúˑbí	*/cúːpí/
112	beans	*gánami	*/kánàmì/
114	seed	*gáwɪc̠ɪ	*/káwi̥TSi̥/
119	bear	*gúháyᴀ	*/kúhájḁ/
124	yucca	*háʔásc̐á	*/háʔástʃʼá/
127	oak	*ha̍ˑbánɪ	
137	pine tree	*hâˑniˑ	*/hâːniː/
147	Jemez Pueblo	*héˑmíšíˑ-cɪ, *héˑmíšíˑ-zé	*/héːmíʃíː-tsʰi̥/, */héːmíʃíː-tsé/
149	turtle	*héyᴀdʸɪ	*/héjḁci̥/
157	willow	*híẓᵻsk̍áwa	*/híʂɨ̥skʼáwa/
158	dove	*húˑʔùˑga	
161	yucca fruit	*hùˑsk̍ani	
169	antelope	*kɨ́ˑc̠ɪ	
175	wolf	*k̍ákana	
176	spider	*k̍ámᴀsk̠ᵻ	
198	mountain lion	*mûˑk̍aiẓᴀ	
200	buffalo	*múšêiẓᴀ	
201	soapweed	*múšɪ	
213	hummingbird	*m̍îˑzᴀ	
225	prairie dog	*nɨ́t̠ɪ	
232	bedbug	*peséc̍uru	
239	salamander	*p̍águra	
241	rabbit	*rèˑdʸᴀ	
246	woodpecker	*sbíga	
247	chicken	*sbíˑná	
251	meadowlark	*sc̐áˑná	
254	grasshopper	*sc̐ár̍ɪ	
260	crow	*sc̐ɨ́r̍á	
262	wild honey	*sc̐úmᵻ	
264	mosquito	*sc̐úy̍úˑná	
274	ant	*síˑʔí	
275	squirrel	*síˑdʸᴀ	
279	mouse	*síyan̍ᵻ	
282	bighorn sheep	*skàˑsk̠ᴜ	
286	bullsnake	*sk̍áʔáˑdʸᴜ	
287	fish	*sk̍àˑšᵻ	
291	peas	*sk̍úrúˑná	
293	dwarf corn	*spíníní	
306	parrot	*šâˑwit̠ᴀ	
307	flea, louse	*šínaˑ	
309	goose	*šúˑdá	
318	blue jay	*ṣúisɪ	
319	snake	*ṣûˑwiˑ	
342	abalone shell	*w̍a̍ˑbɨ́nɪ	
347	duck	*w̍âˑyuṣᴀ	
354	corn silk	*yábášɪ	
355	corn	*yáˑčínɪ	
356	mesquite	*yêˑt̠ᴜ	
357	worm	*yúʔúbɨ́	
369	corn cob	*y̍úˑskúm̍á	

== In popular media ==
Keres was one of the seven languages sung in the Coca-Cola "It's Beautiful" commercial during the 2014 Super Bowl featuring "America the Beautiful".

== See also ==
- Keresan Sign Language

== Bibliography ==
- Boas, Franz (1923). "A Keresan text". International Journal of American Linguistics. 2 (3–4): 171–180. doi:10.1086/463743. S2CID 144375478.
- Campbell, Lyle (1997). American Indian Languages: The Historical Linguistics of Native America. Oxford Studies in Anthropological Linguistics. Vol. 4. New York: Oxford University Press. ISBN 978-0-19-509427-5.
- Davis, Irvine (1963). "Bibliography of Keresan linguistic sources". International Journal of American Linguistics. 29 (3): 289–293. doi:10.1086/464745. S2CID 145202838.
- Davis, Irvine (1964). "The language of Santa Ana Pueblo". Anthropological Papers. Bulletin (Smithsonian Institution, Bureau of American Ethnology). 191 (69). Washington, DC: Smithsonian Institution Press: 53–190. ISSN 0082-8882 – via U.S. Government Printing Office.
- Davis, Irvine (1966). "Acoma Grammar and Texts. Wick R. Miller". Review. American Anthropologist. 68 (3): 810–811. doi:10.1525/aa.1966.68.3.02a00450.
- Davis, Irvine (1968). "Acoma Grammar and Texts. By Wick R. Miller". Review. Language. 44 (1): 185–189. doi:10.2307/411485. JSTOR 411485.
- Davis, Irvine (1974). "Keresan–Caddoan comparisons". International Journal of American Linguistics. 40 (3): 265–267. doi:10.1086/465321. S2CID 143862548.
- Hawley, Florence (1950). "Keresan patterns of kinship and social organization". American Anthropologist. 52 (4): 499–512. doi:10.1525/aa.1950.52.4.02a00050.
- Kroskrity, Paul V. (1983). "On male and female speech in the Pueblo Southwest". International Journal of American Linguistics. 49 (1): 88–91. doi:10.1086/465769. S2CID 144870648.
- Lachler, Jordan (2006). A grammar of Laguna Keres (PhD thesis). University of New Mexico. ISBN 978-05-4273622-3.
- Maring, Joel M. (1975). "Speech variation in Acoma Keresan". In Kinkade, M. Dale; Hale, Kenneth L.; Werner, Oswald (eds.). Linguistics and Anthropology: In Honor of C. F. Voegelin. Lisse, Netherlands: Peter de Ridder Press. pp. 473–485. ISBN 978-90-316-0079-3.
- Mickey, Barbara H. (1956). "Acoma kinship terms". Southwestern Journal of Anthropology. 12 (3): 249–256. doi:10.1086/soutjanth.12.3.3629083. S2CID 156497463.
- Miller, Wick R. (1959). "Some notes on Acoma kinship terminology". Southwestern Journal of Anthropology. 15 (2): 179–184. doi:10.1086/soutjanth.15.2.3628805. S2CID 146921018.
- Miller, Wick R. (1959). "Spanish loanwords in Acoma: I". International Journal of American Linguistics. 25 (3): 147–153. doi:10.1086/464521. S2CID 222527399.
- Miller, Wick R. (1960). "Spanish loanwords in Acoma: II". International Journal of American Linguistics. 26 (1): 41–49. doi:10.1086/464552. S2CID 224808846.
- Miller, Wick R. (1965). Acoma Grammar and Texts. University of California Publications in Linguistics. Vol. 40. Berkeley, CA: University of California Press. ISSN 0068-6484.
- Miller, Wick R.; Davis, Irvine (1963). "Proto-Keresan phonology". International Journal of American Linguistics. 29 (4): 310–330. doi:10.1086/464748. S2CID 143519987.
- Mithun, Marianne (1999). The Languages of Native North America. Cambridge Language Surveys. Cambridge: Cambridge University Press. ISBN 978-0-521-29875-9.
- Sims, Christine P.; Valiquette, Hilaire (1990). "More on male and female speech in (Acoma and Laguna) Keresan". International Journal of American Linguistics. 56 (1): 162–166. doi:10.1086/466144. S2CID 143626730.
- Spencer, Robert F. (1946). "The phonemes of Keresan". International Journal of American Linguistics. 12 (4): 229–236. doi:10.1086/463918. S2CID 144257720.
- Spencer, Robert F. (1947). "Spanish loanwords in Keresan". Southwestern Journal of Anthropology. 3 (2): 130–146. doi:10.1086/soutjanth.3.2.3628729. S2CID 164169397.
- Valiquette, Hilaire Paul (1990). A study for a lexicon of Laguna Keresan (PhD thesis). University of New Mexico.
- Walker, Willard (1967). "Acoma Grammar and Texts. By Wick R. Miller". Review. International Journal of American Linguistics. 33 (3): 254–257. doi:10.1086/464971.
- White, Leslie A. (1928). "Summary report of field work at Acoma". American Anthropologist. 30 (4): 559–568. doi:10.1525/aa.1928.30.4.02a00020.
- Yumitani, Yukihiro (1987). "A comparative sketch of Pueblo languages: Phonology". Kansas Working Papers in Linguistics. 12: 119–139. doi:10.17161/KWPL.1808.514. hdl:1808/514.
