= Algodones, New Mexico =

- CDP
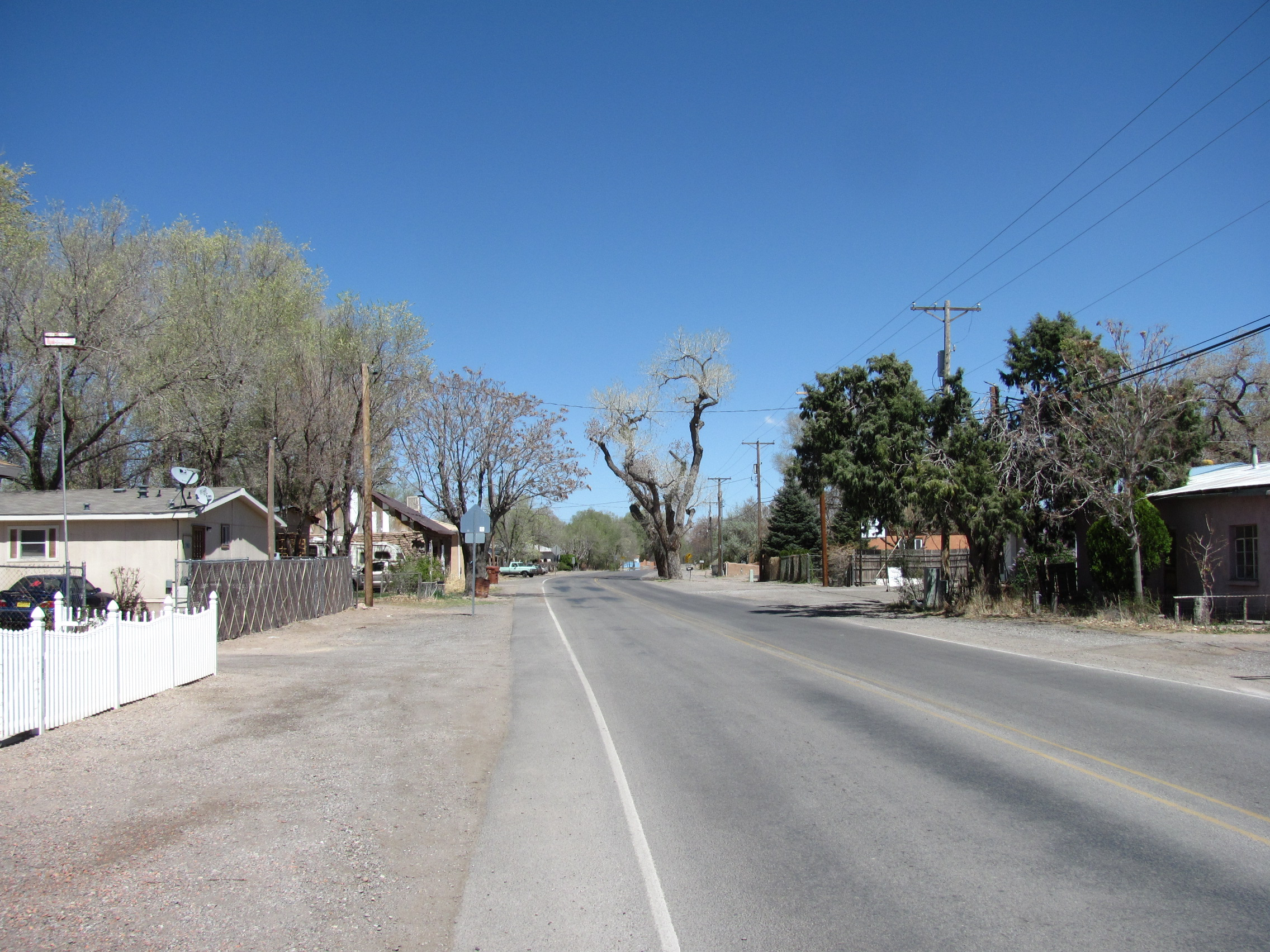
- El Camino Real

- Location of Algodones, New Mexico

- Location in the United States
- Coordinates: 35°22′44″N 106°29′7″W
- Country: United States
- State: New Mexico
- County: Sandoval

Area
  - Total: 7.41 sq mi (19.20 km^{2})
  - Land: 7.31 sq mi (18.93 km^{2})
  - Water: 0.11 sq mi (0.28 km^{2})
- Elevation: 5,112 ft (1,558 m)

Population (2020)
  - Total: 720
  - Density: 98.5/sq mi (38.04/km^{2})
- Time zone: UTC-7 (Mountain (MST))
  - Summer (DST): UTC-6 (MDT)
- ZIP code: 87001
- Area code: 505
- FIPS code: 35-02210
- GNIS feature ID: 0899497

Algodones (English: Cotton or Cottons) is a census-designated place (CDP) in Sandoval County, New Mexico, United States. As of the 2020 census, Algodones had a population of 720. It is part of the Albuquerque Metropolitan Statistical Area.

== Geography ==
Algodones lies in the Rio Grande Valley in the northeast of the Albuquerque Basin on the east bank of the Rio Grande. According to the United States Census Bureau, the CDP has a total area of 7.3 square miles (19 km^{2}), of which 7.2 square miles (19 km^{2}) is land and 0.1 square miles (0.26 km^{2}) (1.37%) is water.

== History ==
Near the town of Algodones lies a narrow pass known as La Angostura. The pass was important for trade along the Camino Real, and was the site of fortifications dating from the early 17th century to control movement along the road. The village of Algodones developed in the 18th century during continuing efforts by the Spanish settlers to control the nearby Rio Grande river fords and passes through the valley.

== Demographics ==
Historical population
Census	Pop.	Note	%±
2020	720		—
U.S. Decennial Census

As of the census of 2000, there were 688 people, 236 households, and 182 families residing in the CDP. The population density was 95.4 inhabitants per square mile (36.8/km^{2}). There were 257 housing units at an average density of 35.6 per square mile (13.7/km^{2}). The racial makeup of the CDP was 55.52% White, 0.58% African American, 2.33% Native American, 0.15% Asian, 39.39% from other races, and 2.03% from two or more races. Hispanic or Latino of any race were 73.40% of the population.

There were 236 households, out of which 40.3% had children under the age of 18 living with them, 60.6% were married couples living together, 9.3% had a female householder with no husband present, and 22.5% were non-families. 14.8% of all households were made up of individuals, and 5.1% had someone living alone who was 65 years of age or older. The average household size was 2.92 and the average family size was 3.32.

In the CDP, the population was spread out, with 31.5% under the age of 18, 6.7% from 18 to 24, 31.3% from 25 to 44, 22.2% from 45 to 64, and 8.3% who were 65 years of age or older. The median age was 33 years. For every 100 females, there were 100.6 males. For every 100 females age 18 and over, there were 97.1 males.

The median income for a household in the CDP was $39,792, and the median income for a family was $42,813. Males had a median income of $30,833 versus $26,477 for females. The per capita income for the CDP was $15,214. About 10.2% of families and 9.8% of the population were below the poverty line, including 7.4% of those under age 18 and 3.6% of those age 65 or over.

== Education ==
It is in the Bernalillo Public Schools district, which operates Algodones Elementary School in Algodones, Bernalillo Middle School (the zoned middle school of this community), and Bernalillo High School.

== Gallery ==
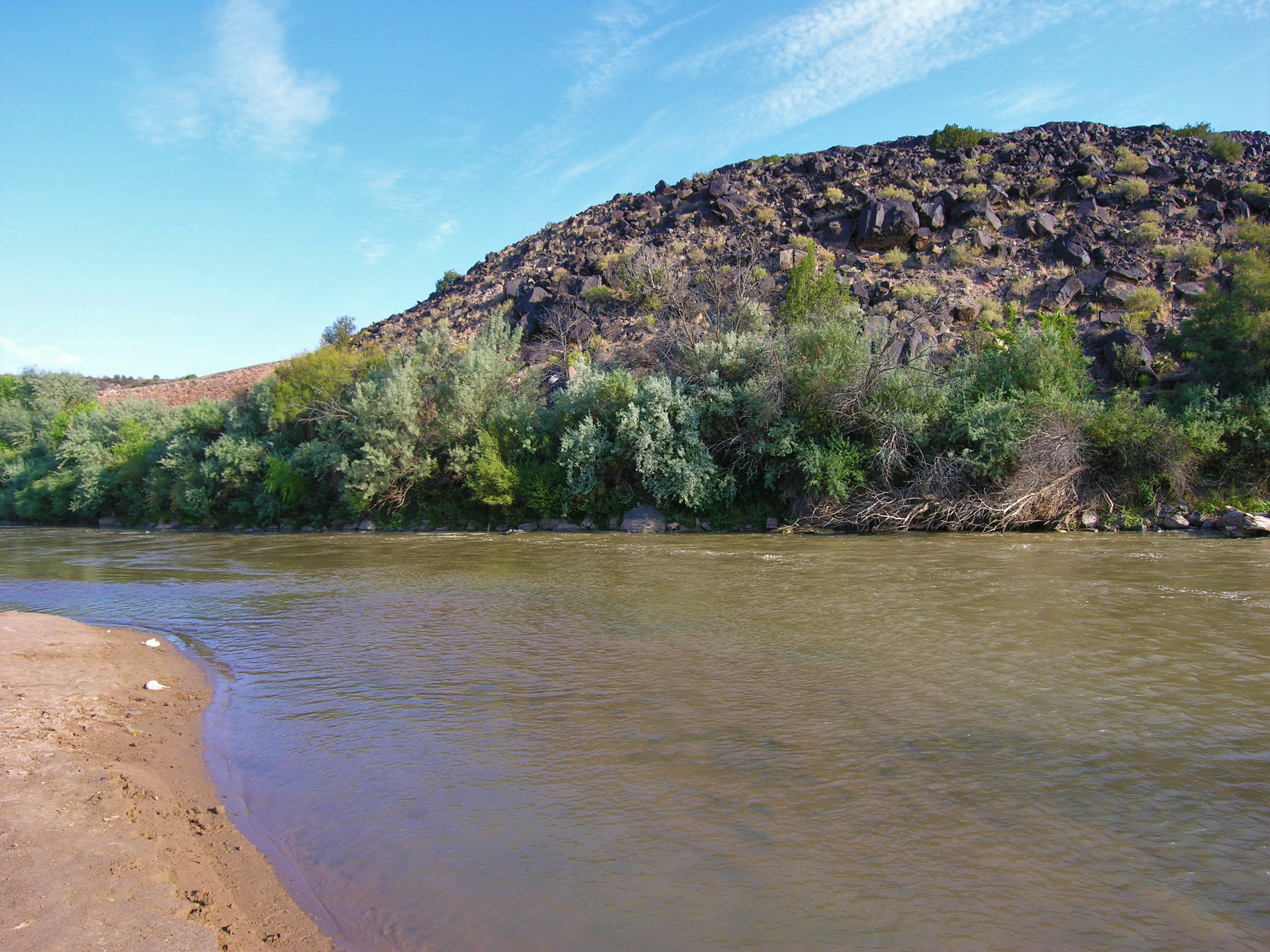
Rio Grande at Algodones, New Mexico

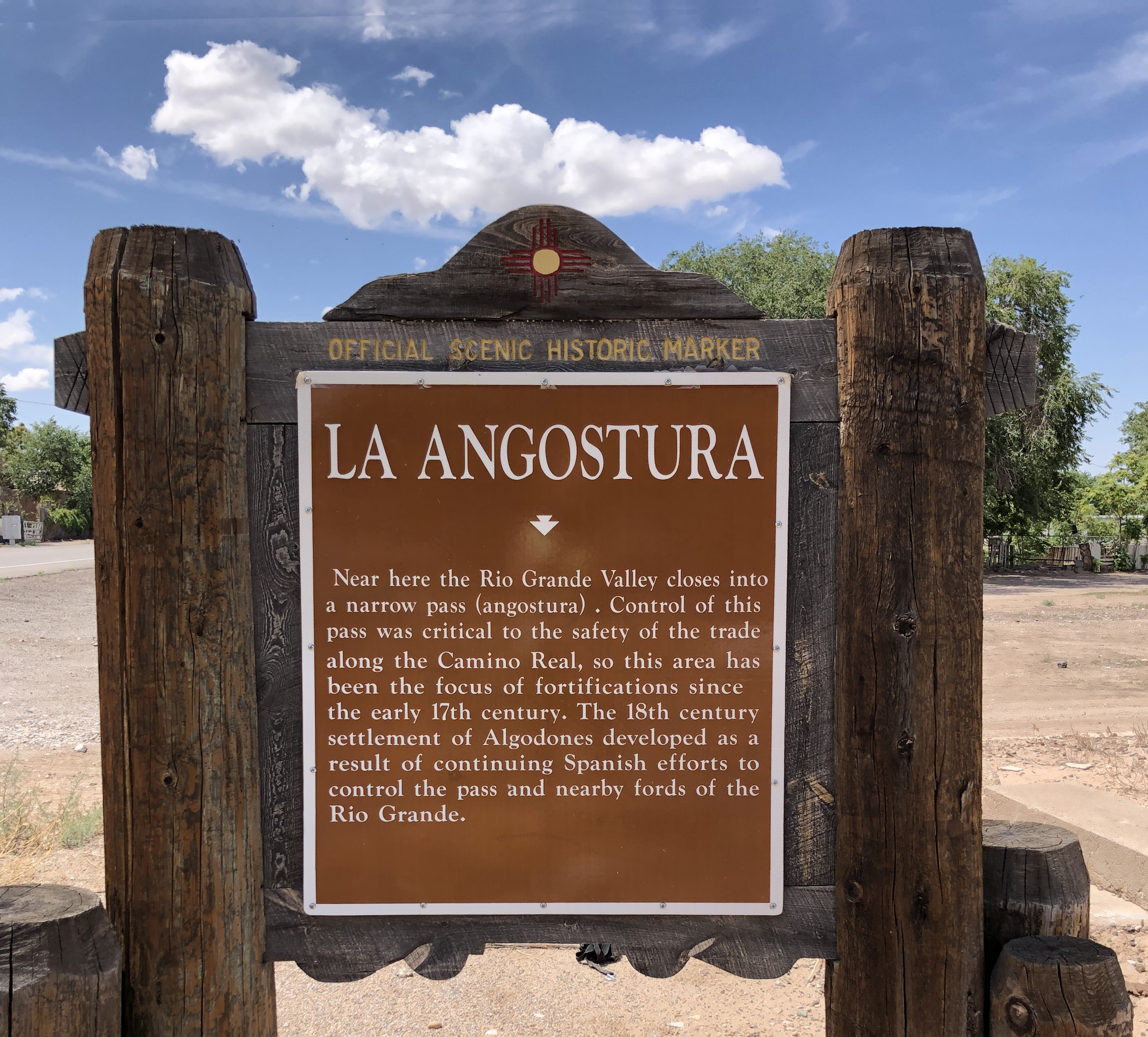
Algodones, New Mexico (La Angostura historical marker)
