= Jemez =

Jemez or Jémez may refer to

- Jemez Pueblo, New Mexico, a census-designated place in the United States
  - Jemez Springs, New Mexico, a village
  - Jemez Mountains
  - Jemez Mountains salamander (Plethodon neomexicanus)
  - Jemez Mountains Electric Cooperative, Inc.
  - Jemez Falls, a waterfall in the Jemez Mountains
  - Jemez River in the area of the Jemez Mountains
  - Jemez National Forest
  - Jemez Canyon Dam
  - Jemez Lineament, a series of faults
  - Jemez Historic Site, a state-operated historic site
  - Jemez Valley Public Schools
  - Jemez National Recreation Area
- Jemez language
- Paco Jémez (born 1970), Spanish football defender
