= New Mexico State Road 4 =

State highway in New Mexico, United States

State Road 4
- NM 4 highlighted in red

Route information
- Maintained by NMDOT
- Length: 67.946 mi (109.348 km)
- Tourist routes: Part of Jemez Mountain Trail National Scenic Byway

Major junctions
- West end: US 550 in San Ysidro
- NM 290 in Jemez Pueblo; NM 485 north of Cañon; NM 126 in La Cueva; NM 501 southwest of Los Alamos
- East end: NM 502 north of White Rock

Location
- Country: United States
- State: New Mexico
- Counties: Sandoval, Los Alamos, Santa Fe

Highway system
- New Mexico State Highway System; Interstate; US; State; Scenic
← NM 3	→ NM 5

New Mexico State Road 4 (NM 4) is a 67.946-mile-long (109.348 km) state highway in Sandoval, Los Alamos, and Santa Fe counties in New Mexico, United States. It is significant as the main access route (in conjunction with NM 501 and NM 502) connecting the remote town of Los Alamos, Los Alamos National Laboratory, and Bandelier National Monument to other, more major highways in New Mexico.

== Route description ==
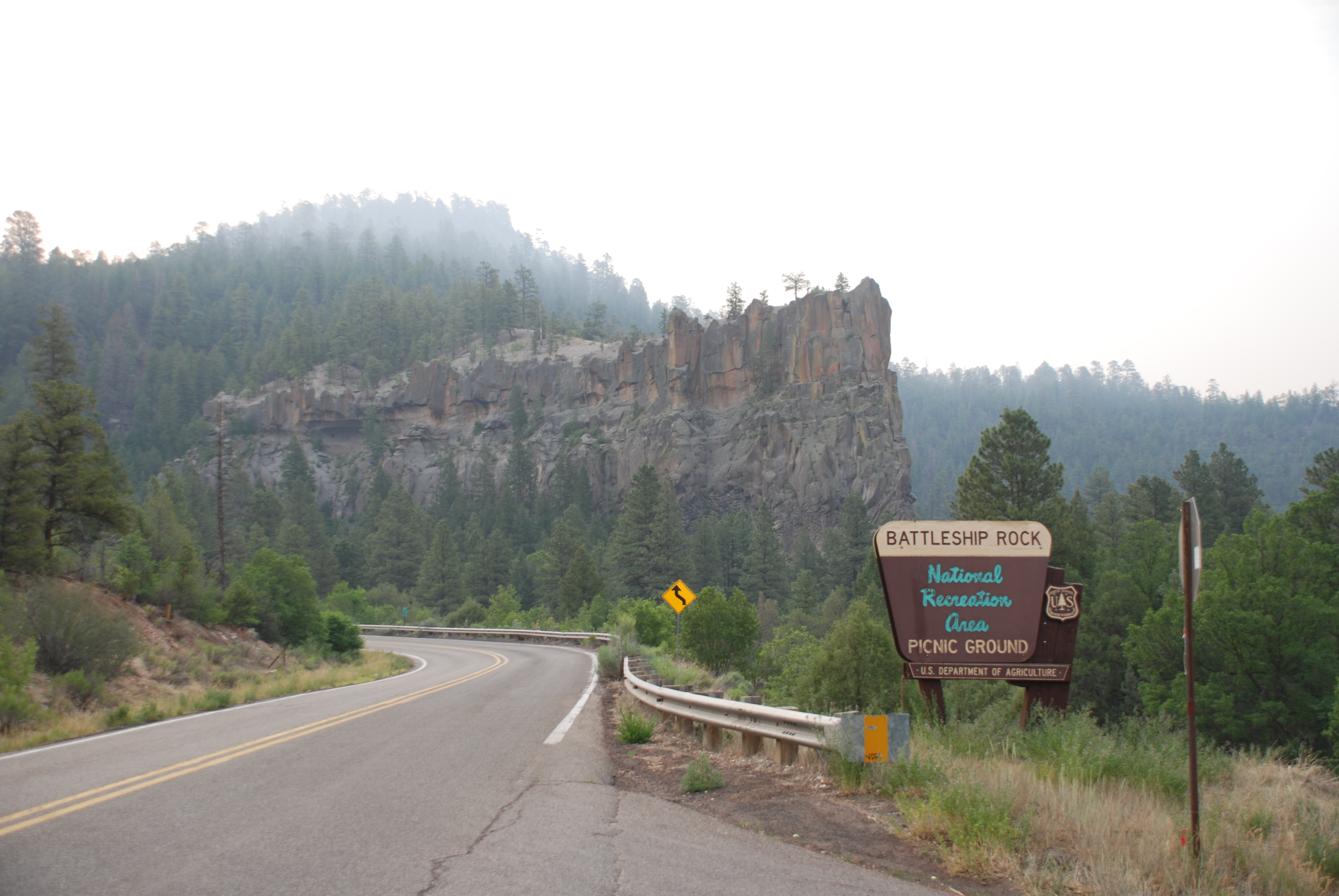
NM 4 approaching Battleship Rock, June 2011

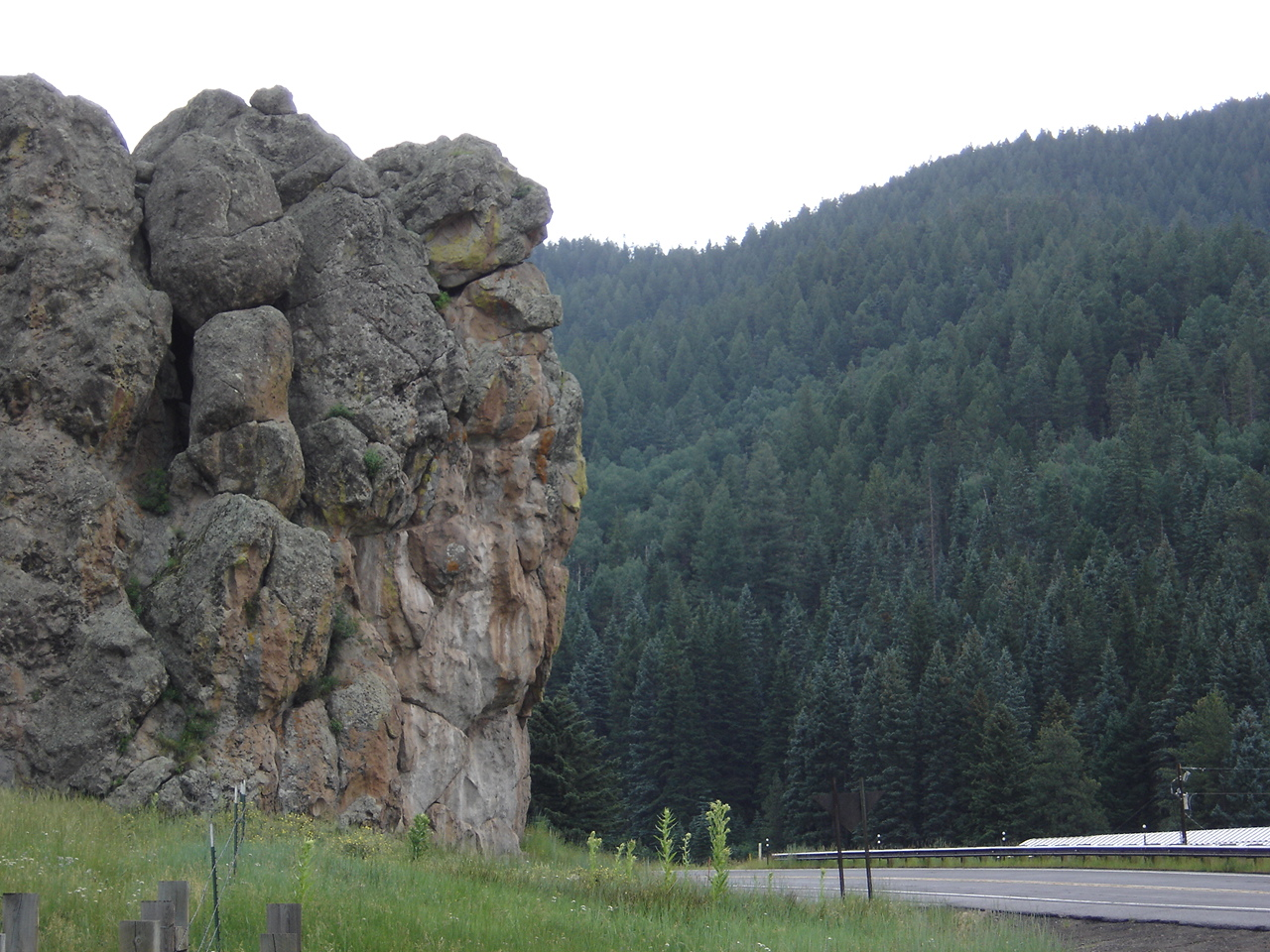
An outcropping in the Valles Caldera along the highway, July 2007

NM 4's western terminus is in the small town of San Ysidro, at U.S Route 550. The route passes through Jemez Pueblo and Jemez Springs as it climbs steeply into the Jemez Mountains and Santa Fe National Forest, and skirts the southern boundary of Valles Caldera National Preserve. On the east side of the Jemez Mountains, it descends even more steeply, on a series of hairpin turns offering views into Frijoles Canyon in Bandelier National Monument, to a junction with NM 501 leading east into the town of Los Alamos. NM 4 itself continues past the main entrance to Bandelier and several Los Alamos National Laboratory sites, as well as the town of White Rock, to another junction with NM 502 east of Los Alamos, where the route ends. The continuation of NM 502 to Pojoaque was formerly designated as NM 4 as well.

In contrast to several other state highways in northern New Mexico, NM 4 is paved for its entire length. It is predominantly a 2-lane road, with passing lanes in several places in the mountains. A short section near White Rock was 4-lane until its reconstruction in 2012; now that stretch is 2 lanes with many left-turn turn lanes going to businesses and streets in White Rock. Speed limits on most of the highway are 50 or 55 miles per hour (mph), although the tight curves make it dangerous to maintain maximum speed in many sections. Speed limits are lower near and through the towns.

The coniferous forest traversed by NM 4 in its upper regions is prone to severe forest fires, several of which have burned up to the highway. Unfortunately, the highway is too narrow to serve as an effective firebreak, and such devastating fires as the 1977 La Mesa Fire and 2000 Cerro Grande Fire, the most severe forest fire in the state's history, have jumped the road to destroy forests, and habitations, on both sides of the road—in the case of the Cerro Grande Fire, into the upper reaches of Frijoles Canyon, contributing significantly to the magnitude of the disaster caused by the fire.

== National Scenic Byway ==
NM 4 forms the main artery of the Jemez Mountain Trail National Scenic Byway. The Byway includes short excursions on New Mexico State Roads 502, 126, and 290. Notable points of interest on the NM 4 section of the Byway include:

- Jemez Pueblo;
- The red rock of Cañon de San Diego;
- The Jemez River, with numerous protected areas affording access for fishing;
- Jemez State Monument, protecting both Puebloan ruins and ruins of a mission constructed by 16th-century Spanish explorers;
- Jemez Falls, a 70-foot (21 m)-high waterfall reached by a short hiking trail from a turnoff;
- Valles Caldera National Preserve;
- Bandelier National Monument, with hiking and Nordic skiing trails to Frijoles Canyon, Cerro Grande (highest summit in the monument, at 10,199 feet), and the Tsankawi outlier reachable from trailheads at turnouts.

== Major intersections ==
County	Location	mi	km	Destinations	Notes
Sandoval	San Ysidro	0.000	0.000	US 550 – Bernalillo, Cuba	Western terminus
Sandoval	Jemez Pueblo	6.161	9.915	NM 290 north – Ponderosa	Southern terminus of NM 290
Sandoval		9.454	15.215	NM 485 north	Southern terminus of NM 485
Sandoval	La Cueva	26.270	42.277	NM 126 east – Cuba	Western terminus of NM 126
Los Alamos		49.698	79.981	NM 501 east – Los Alamos	Western terminus of NM 501
Santa Fe		67.946	109.348	NM 502 – Los Alamos, Pojoaque	Eastern terminus
1.000 mi = 1.609 km; 1.000 km = 0.621 mi

== See also ==
- List of state roads in New Mexico
