= New Mexico State Road 485 =

State highway in New Mexico, United States

State Road 485
- NM 485 highlighted in red

Route information
- Maintained by NMDOT
- Length: 3.900 mi (6.276 km)

Major junctions
- South end: NM 4 near Jemez Pueblo
- North end: Forest Road 376 near Cañones

Location
- Country: United States
- State: New Mexico
- Counties: Sandoval

Highway system
- New Mexico State Highway System; Interstate; US; State; Scenic
| ← NM 484 | → US 491 |

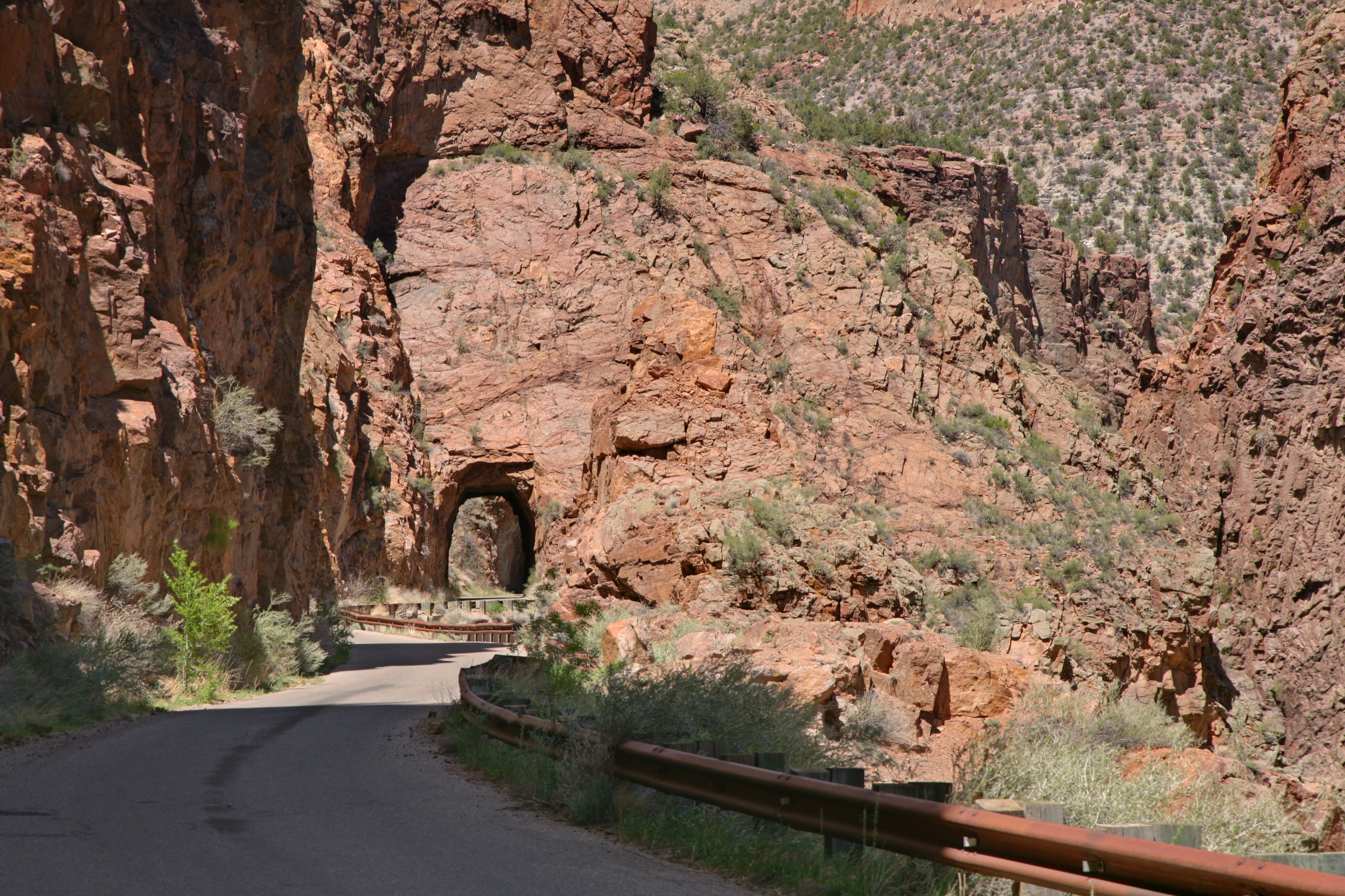
Gilman tunnels on FR376 can be reached vis NM 485

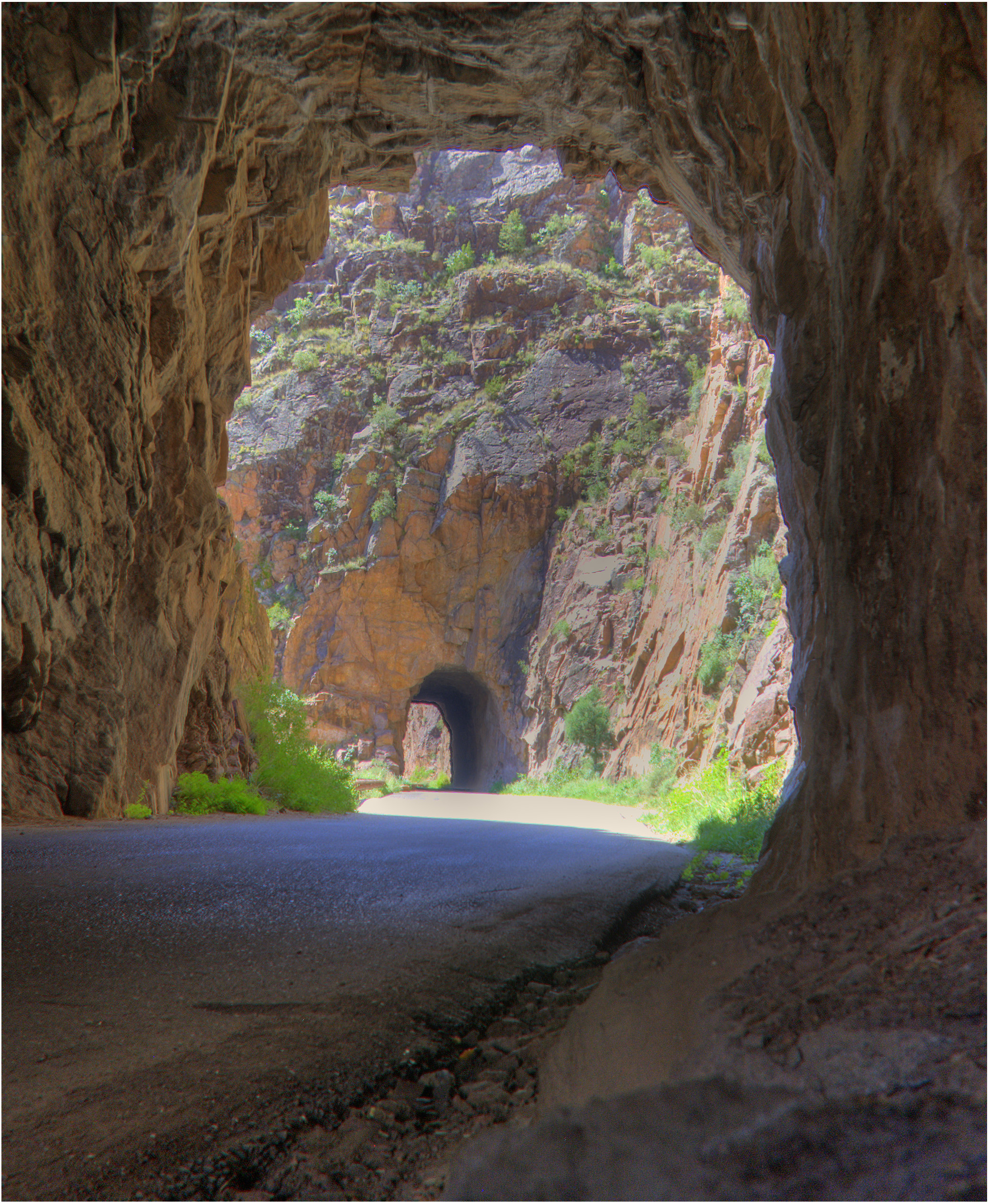

State Road 485 (NM 485) is a 3.9-mile-long (6.3 km) state highway in the US state of New Mexico. NM 485's southern terminus is near the small town of Jemez Pueblo, at NM 4. The route passes through land belonging to the pueblo near the Nacimiento Mountains and follows the canyon of the Rio Guadalupe until the pavement ends. The highway intersects and adjoins the Jemez Mountain Trail National Scenic Byway.

== Gilman Tunnels ==
The road through the Rio Guadalupe box canyon bears the designation Forest Road 376 in Santa Fe National Forest near the unincorporated town of Cañones (or Gilman). The continuation as Forest Road 376 eventually terminates at New Mexico State Road 126 east of San Pedro Parks Wilderness. The route incorporates the Gilman Tunnels (1 mi (1.6 km) beyond the transition to Forest Road 376) which was part of the former Santa Fe Northwestern Railway (SFNW) through the canyon which was used to haul lumber from the Jemez Mountains. The railway opened in 1924 but never recovered financially from the Wall Street crash of 1929, and ceased operations in May 1941 following flood damage from the Rio Guadalupe.

The Gilman Tunnels were used in the filming of the 2007 motion picture 3:10 to Yuma.

The tunnels pass through a beautiful Precambrian monzogranite with an radiometric age of 1450 million years.

== Major intersections ==
The entire route is in Sandoval County.

| Location | mi | km | Destinations | Notes |
|---|---|---|---|---|
| | 0.000 | 0.000 | NM 4 | Southern terminus |
| | 3.900 | 6.276 | Forest Road 376 | Northern terminus; road continues into Santa Fe National Forest |
1.000 mi = 1.609 km; 1.000 km = 0.621 mi
