= Jemez Mountains Electric Cooperative =

Rural utility cooperative in New Mexico, US

- Company type: Electric cooperative
- Founded: 1948
- Headquarters: Hernandez, New Mexico, United States
- Area served: Sandoval, McKinley, San Juan, Rio Arriba, and Santa Fe Counties
- Website: jemezcoop.org

Jemez Mountains Electric Cooperative is the rural utility cooperative providing electricity to the residents of Sandoval, McKinley, San Juan, Santa Fe, and Rio Arriba counties. Jemez Mountains Electric Cooperative, Inc. has three offices. The main office in Hernandez, an office in Jemez Springs, and an office in Cuba. It is New Mexico's largest electric cooperative in geographical size and membership base and is governed by an eleven member board of trustees elected by the membership to operate affairs.

== Board of trustees ==
Name	Position	Residence	Took office	Up for re–election
Dennis R. Trujillo	District 1, President	Ponderosa	2017	2025
Dolores G. McCoy	District 2, Treasurer	Cuba	2009	2025
Dennis Gallegos	District 3	Abiquiu	2021	2025
Lucas J. Cordova, Jr.	District 4 (Ward A)	Chili	2007	2023
John Ramon Vigil	District 4 (Ward B), Secretary	West Española	2020	2025
Manuel N. Bustos	District 5 (at-large), Vice-President	Ranchitos	2021	2025
Stanley G. Crawford	District 5 (Ward A)	Dixon	2019	2023
Elias Coriz	District 5 (Ward B)	Chimayo	2021	2025
Marcelina Martinez	District 6 (Ward A)	Cuarteles	2021	2025
Bruce Duran	District 6 (Ward B)	El Rancho	2015	2023
Marissa Maestas-Muller	Trustee-At-large	Nambe	2020	2023

== See also ==
- Local government in New Mexico
- United States energy law
