= 1920 United States presidential election in New Mexico =

- November 2, 1920
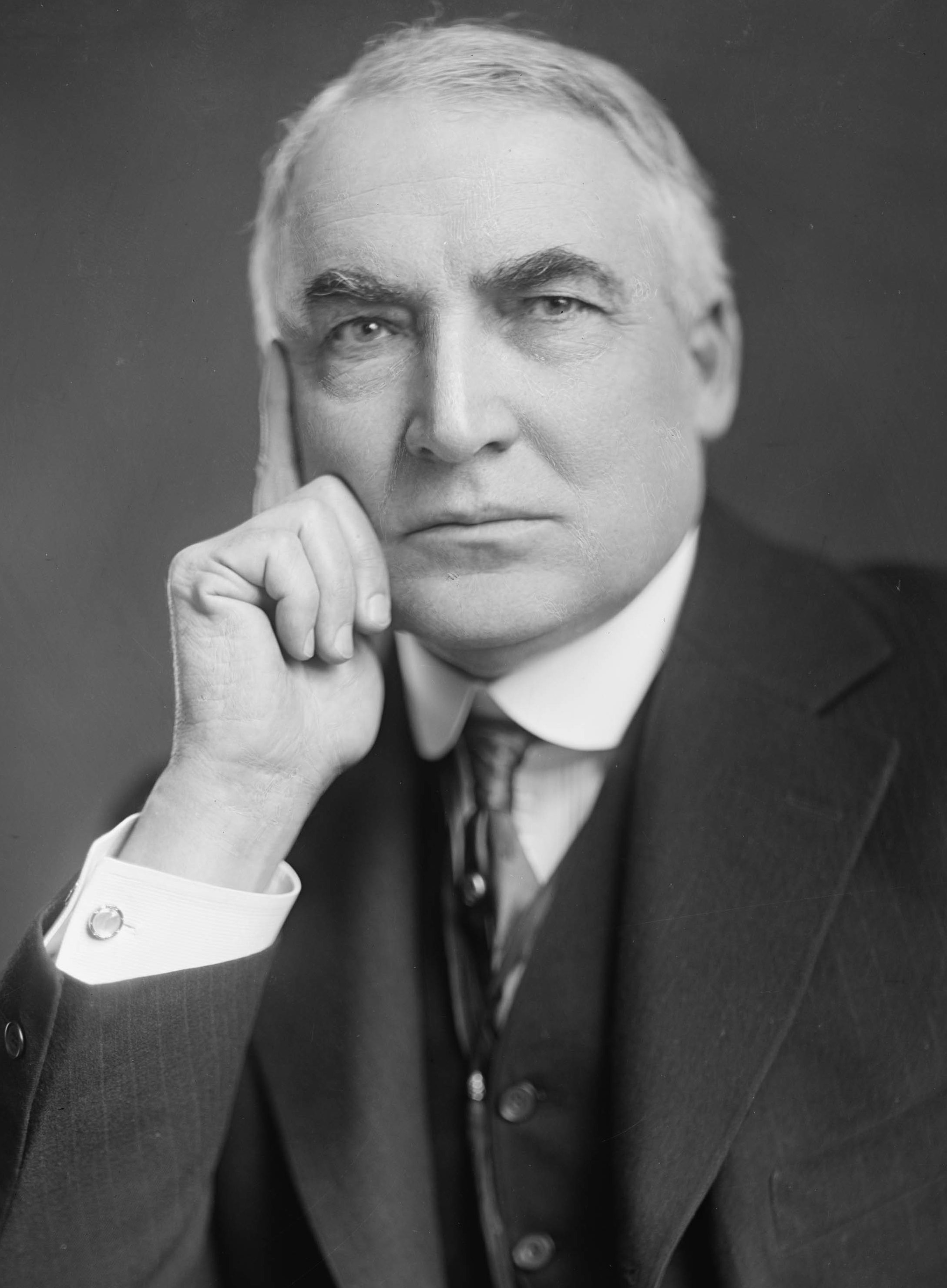

Nominee	Warren G. Harding	James M. Cox
Party	Republican	Democratic
Home state	Ohio	Ohio
Running mate	Calvin Coolidge	Franklin D. Roosevelt
Electoral vote	3	0
Popular vote	57,634	46,668
Percentage	54.68%	44.27%
County results
Harding
50–60%
60–70%
70–80%
Cox
50–60%
60–70%
70–80%
President before election
Woodrow Wilson
Democratic
Elected President
Warren G. Harding
Republican

The 1920 United States presidential election in New Mexico took place on November 2, 1920. All contemporary forty-eight States were part of the 1920 United States presidential election. Voters chose three electors to represent them in the Electoral College, which voted for President and Vice President.

During the period between New Mexico's annexation by the United States and statehood, the area was divided between largely Republican machine-run highland regions (which were a mix of Hispanos and Anglo migrants from the Midwest and Northeast) and its firmly Southern Democrat and Baptist "Little Texas" region to the southeast. A split in the "Old Guard" of highland Republicanism meant that in the state's inaugural presidential election in 1912 Woodrow Wilson carried the state through overwhelming "Little Texas" and southern desert support over Progressive Theodore Roosevelt and incumbent Republican William Howard Taft. Four years later in 1916, Wilson gained sufficient Progressive support to narrowly hold the state against Charles Evans Hughes and the reunited Republican Party; however, in 1918, despite extremely low turnout due to the Spanish flu epidemic the reunited GOP regained considerable strength.

The following two years saw the Democratic Party's prospects decline still further due to skyrocketing inflation helping make President Wilson very unpopular – besides which the President also had major health problems that had left First Lady Edith effectively running the nation. Political unrest observed in the Palmer Raids and the "Red Scare" further added to the unpopularity of the Democratic Party, since this global political turmoil produced considerable fear of alien revolutionaries invading the country. However, owing to its Anglo population's ties to the Southern United States, New Mexico was not nearly so isolationist as Appalachia or the Midwest, but the state's farmers did come to believe that the old Confederacy was gaining preferential treatment – to its disadvantage – from the Democratic administration.

Neither Harding nor Cox campaigned in this electoral-vote-poor state; however, a powerful group of corporate Republicans campaigned extensively for Harding, as did Senator Albert Fall, who was a very close associate of the President-to-be. The corporate and "Old Guard" Republicans campaigned on a "Return to Normalcy" following World War I and the tumult of the Bolshevik Revolution and attempts to spread it across Europe.

New Mexico was won by Ohio Senator Warren G. Harding, in a strong 10-percentage-point sweep against Ohio Governor James M. Cox. Despite this victory, New Mexico was still sixteen percentage points more Democratic than the nation at-large, because the internationalist and traditionally Democratic Plains regions remained extremely loyal to Cox, and Fall's campaign in urban Bernalillo County was so ineffective that that county actually swung 4 percentage points towards the Democrats amidst a national 29-percentage-point swing.

== Results ==
General Election Results
Party	Pledged to	Elector	Votes
Republican Party	Warren G. Harding	E. A. Cahoon	57,634
Republican Party	Warren G. Harding	S. B. Davis Jr.	57,495
Republican Party	Warren G. Harding	Antonio Gomez	57,442
Democratic Party	James M. Cox	R. L. Young	46,668
Democratic Party	James M. Cox	James B. Priddy	46,590
Democratic Party	James M. Cox	Severino Martinez	46,584
Farmer-Labor Party	Parley P. Christensen	J. D. Hume	1,104
Farmer-Labor Party	Parley P. Christensen	Louis Ve Verka	1,097
Farmer-Labor Party	Parley P. Christensen	Donald McRae	1,089
Write-in		Allen Busen	4
Write-in		Helquist Norris	4
Write-in		Upton Sinclair	4
Write-in		E. V. Debs	2
Write-in		James W. Cox	1
Votes cast (Note: Based on totals for highest elector on each ticket)			105,421

=== Results by county ===
County	Warren G. Harding Republican		James M. Cox Democratic		Parley P. Christensen Farmer-Labor		Scattering Write-in		Margin		Total votes cast (Note: Based on the highest elector on each ticket)
County	#	%	#	%	#	%	#	%	#	%	Total votes cast
Bernalillo	4,969	50.53%	4,808	48.90%	56	0.57%	0	0.00%	161	1.64%	9,833
Chaves	1,765	45.54%	2,080	53.66%	31	0.80%	0	0.00%	-315	-8.13%	3,876
Colfax	3,351	54.87%	2,709	44.36%	47	0.77%	0	0.00%	642	10.51%	6,107
Curry	884	27.81%	2,143	67.41%	152	4.78%	0	0.00%	-1,259	-39.60%	3,179
De Baca	412	36.75%	693	61.82%	16	1.43%	0	0.00%	-281	-25.07%	1,121
Doña Ana	2,627	66.27%	1,318	33.25%	19	0.48%	0	0.00%	1,309	33.02%	3,964
Eddy	982	37.42%	1,611	61.39%	31	1.18%	0	0.00%	-629	-23.97%	2,624
Grant	2,230	53.76%	1,879	45.30%	38	0.92%	1	0.02%	351	8.46%	4,148
Guadalupe	1,599	56.30%	1,224	43.10%	17	0.60%	0	0.00%	375	13.20%	2,840
Hidalgo	443	43.82%	551	54.50%	4	0.40%	13	1.29%	-108	-10.68%	1,011
Lea	255	25.22%	733	72.50%	23	2.27%	0	0.00%	-478	-47.28%	1,011
Lincoln	1,456	57.32%	1,047	41.22%	37	1.46%	0	0.00%	409	16.10%	2,540
Luna	834	44.65%	1,000	53.33%	34	1.82%	0	0.00%	-166	-8.89%	1,868
McKinley	1,525	60.02%	989	38.92%	27	1.06%	0	0.00%	536	21.09%	2,541
Mora	2,478	52.89%	2,179	46.51%	28	0.60%	0	0.00%	299	6.38%	4,685
Otero	1,229	51.36%	1,095	45.76%	69	2.88%	0	0.00%	134	5.60%	2,393
Quay	1,213	39.15%	1,813	58.52%	72	2.32%	0	0.00%	-600	-19.37%	3,098
Rio Arriba	3,986	65.97%	2,056	34.03%	0	0.00%	0	0.00%	1,930	31.94%	6,042
Roosevelt	571	31.43%	1,178	64.83%	68	3.74%	0	0.00%	-607	-33.41%	1,817
San Juan	985	53.39%	831	45.04%	28	1.52%	1	0.05%	154	8.35%	1,845
San Miguel	5,535	58.11%	3,990	41.89%	0	0.00%	0	0.00%	1,545	16.22%	9,525
Sandoval	1,194	57.46%	884	42.54%	0	0.00%	0	0.00%	310	14.92%	2,078
Santa Fe	3,060	63.92%	1,700	35.51%	27	0.56%	0	0.00%	1,360	28.41%	4,787
Sierra	862	56.79%	642	42.29%	14	0.92%	0	0.00%	220	14.49%	1,518
Socorro	3,150	63.16%	1,807	36.23%	30	0.60%	0	0.00%	1,343	26.93%	4,987
Taos	2,519	64.86%	1,359	34.99%	6	0.15%	0	0.00%	1,160	29.87%	3,884
Torrance	1,751	60.28%	1,125	38.73%	29	1.00%	0	0.00%	626	21.55%	2,905
Union	2,930	54.38%	2,273	42.19%	185	3.43%	0	0.00%	657	12.19%	5,388
Valencia	2,839	74.59%	951	24.99%	16	0.42%	0	0.00%	1,888	49.61%	3,806
Total	57,634	54.67%	46,668	44.27%	1,104	1.05%	15	0.01%	10,966	10.40%	105,421

==== Counties that flipped from Democratic to Republican ====
- Colfax
- Grant
- Guadalupe
- Otero
- San Juan
- Sandoval
- Sierra
- Union
