= San Ysidro, Sandoval County, New Mexico =

Village in Sandoval County, New Mexico, United States

San Ysidro, New Mexico
- Village
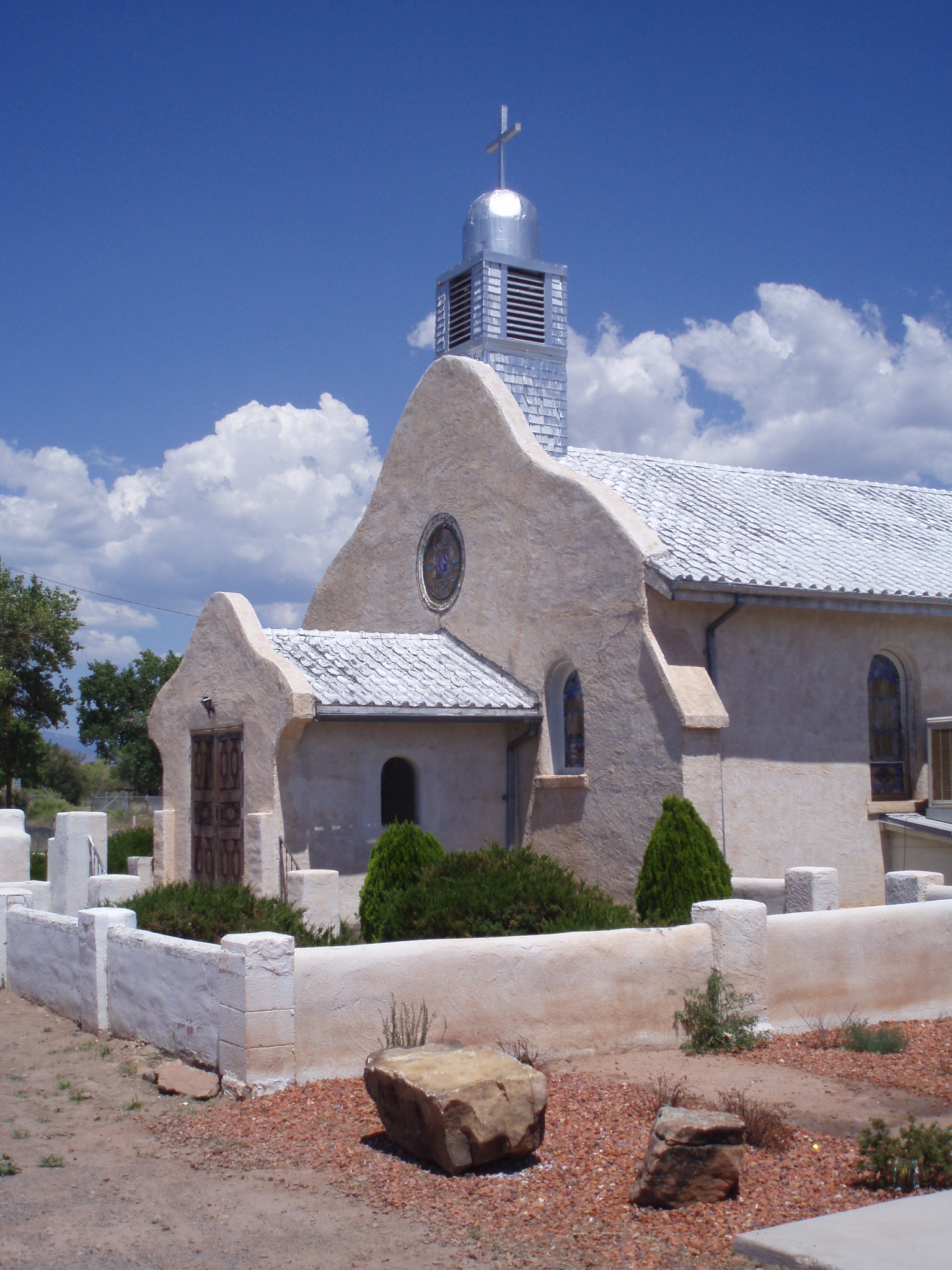
- Old church in San Ysidro

- Location of San Ysidro, New Mexico

- Location in the United States
- Coordinates: 35°33′38″N 106°46′25″W
- Country: United States
- State: New Mexico
- County: Sandoval

Area
  - Total: 2.34 sq mi (6.06 km^{2})
  - Land: 2.34 sq mi (6.06 km^{2})
  - Water: 0 sq mi (0.00 km^{2})
- Elevation: 5,473 ft (1,668 m)

Population (2020)
  - Total: 166
  - Density: 71.0/sq mi (27.41/km^{2})
- Time zone: UTC-7 (Mountain (MST))
  - Summer (DST): UTC-6 (MDT)
- ZIP code: 87053
- Area code: 575
- FIPS code: 35-71020
- GNIS feature ID: 2413589
- Website: www.sanysidronm.gov

San Ysidro is a village in Sandoval County, New Mexico, United States. The population was 193 at the 2010 census. It is part of the Albuquerque Metropolitan Statistical Area.

== Description ==
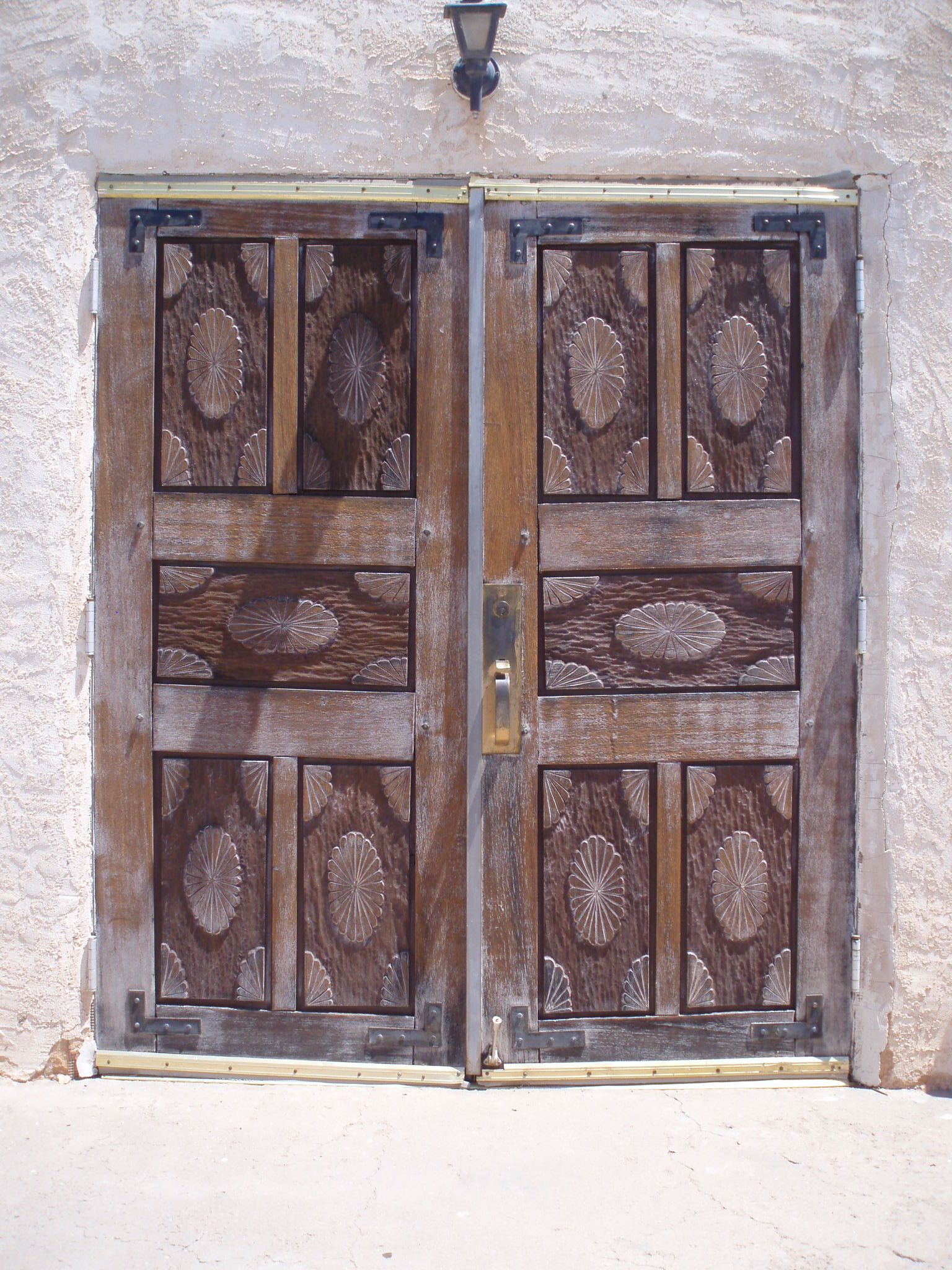
Church doors, San Ysidro

The village is near the junction of U.S. Highway 550 and New Mexico State Road 4, at the south end of the Jemez Valley. The Jemez River runs through San Ysidro, just north of where the Rio Salado joins the Jemez River.

The village has been a farming community since 1699 when Juan Trujillo established a settlement named for San Ysidro, or Saint Isidore the Farmer. The Village was incorporated in 1967. An annual San Ysidro Fiesta Day is held each year in mid-May.

In 2007, the exterior sets for the Taylor Hackford film Love Ranch were built just outside of San Ysidro on Highway 550.

== Geography ==
According to the United States Census Bureau, the village has a total area of 2.3 square miles (6.0 km^{2}), all land.

== Demographics ==
Historical population
Census	Pop.	Note	%±
1970	182		—
1980	199		9.3%
1990	233		17.1%
2000	238		2.1%
2010	193		−18.9%
2020	166		−14.0%
U.S. Decennial Census

As of the census of 2000, there were 238 people, 86 households, and 63 families residing in the village. The population density was 101.8 inhabitants per square mile (39.3/km^{2}). There were 99 housing units at an average density of 42.3 per square mile (16.3/km^{2}). The racial makeup of the village was 30.67% White, 0.84% African American, 7.56% Native American, 53.78% from other races, and 7.14% from two or more races. Hispanic or Latino of any race were 71.85% of the population.

There were 86 households, out of which 33.7% had children under the age of 18 living with them, 44.2% were married couples living together, 24.4% had a female householder with no husband present, and 25.6% were non-families. 22.1% of all households were made up of individuals, and 4.7% had someone living alone who was 65 years of age or older. The average household size was 2.77 and the average family size was 3.16.

In the village, the population was spread out, with 29.0% under the age of 18, 9.7% from 18 to 24, 24.4% from 25 to 44, 23.5% from 45 to 64, and 13.4% who were 65 years of age or older. The median age was 36 years. For every 100 females, there were 84.5 males. For every 100 females age 18 and over, there were 83.7 males.

The median income for a household in the village was $30,521, and the median income for a family was $32,188. Males had a median income of $26,429 versus $16,442 for females. The per capita income for the village was $14,787. About 10.6% of families and 15.1% of the population were below the poverty line, including 17.6% of those under the age of eighteen and 7.7% of those 65 or over.

== Education ==
It is within the Jemez Valley Public Schools school district.

== See also ==
- List of municipalities in New Mexico
