= La Cueva, New Mexico =

La Cueva may refer to the following places in New Mexico:

- La Cueva, Mora County, New Mexico, an unincorporated community
- La Cueva, Sandoval County, New Mexico, an unincorporated community and census-designated place
- La Cueva, Santa Fe County, New Mexico, an unincorporated community
