= New Mexico State Road 126 =

State highway in New Mexico, United States

State Road 126
- NM 126 highlighted in red

Route information
- Maintained by NMDOT
- Length: 39.654 mi (63.817 km)
- Tourist routes: Part of Jemez Mountain Trail National Scenic Byway

Major junctions
- West end: US 550 in Cuba
- East end: NM 4 near Jemez Springs

Location
- Country: United States
- State: New Mexico
- Counties: Sandoval

Highway system
- New Mexico State Highway System; Interstate; US; State; Scenic
← NM 125	→ NM 127

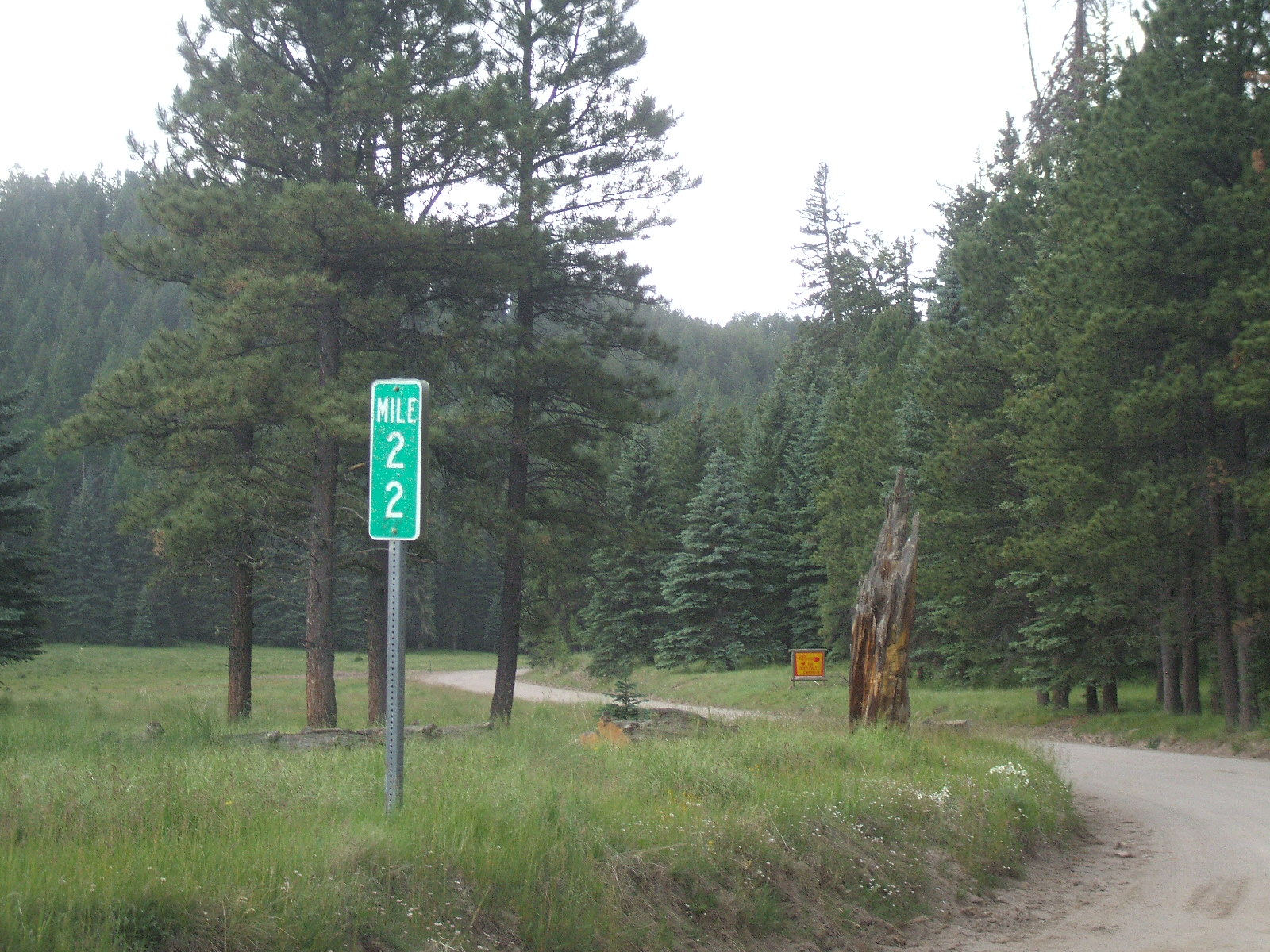
Looking west towards Cuba

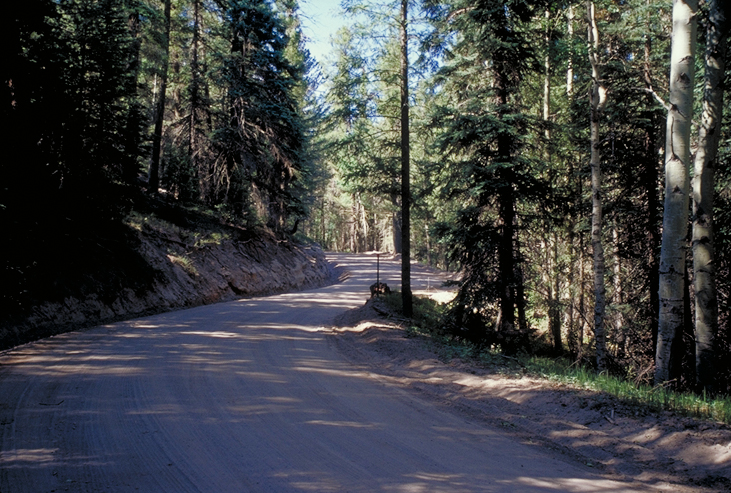
The Jemez Mountain Trail turns rustic on this gravel section near Fenton Lake State Park.

New Mexico State Road 126 (NM 126) is a 39.654-mile-long (63.817 km) state highway in New Mexico, United States. NM 126's western terminus is in the small town of Cuba, at U.S. Route 550 (US 550). The route passes through the Nacimiento Mountains and Jemez Mountains, along the southern boundary of the San Pedro Parks Wilderness, then descends past Fenton Lake to the small, unincorporated community of La Cueva (east of Jemez Springs), where it ends at NM 4.

The highway is a part of the Jemez Mountain Trail National Scenic Byway. It is paved near Cuba and La Cueva, but is a graded dirt road for much of its middle section. This section is usually closed during the winter months, and may be impassable for a few days at other times because of muddy conditions resulting from rainstorms.

== Major intersections ==
The entire route is in Sandoval County.

Location	mi	km	Destinations	Notes
Cuba	0.000	0.000	US 550 – Bloomfield, Bernalillo	Western terminus
	39.654	63.817	NM 4 – Jemez Pueblo, White Rock	Eastern terminus
1.000 mi = 1.609 km; 1.000 km = 0.621 mi
