= New Mexico State Road 290 =

State highway in New Mexico, United States

State Road 290
- NM 290 highlighted in red

Route information
- Maintained by NMDOT
- Length: 6.06 mi (9.75 km)

Major junctions
- Southern end: NM 4 in Jemez Pueblo
- Northern end: End of route at US Forest Service Boundary

Location
- Country: United States
- State: New Mexico
- Counties: Sandoval

Highway system
- New Mexico State Highway System; Interstate; US; State; Scenic
← NM 289	→ NM 291

State Road 290 (NM 290) is a 6.06-mile-long (9.75 km) state highway in the US state of New Mexico. NM 290's southern terminus is at NM 4 in Jemez Pueblo, and the northern terminus is at the end of route at US Forest Service Boundary.

== Route description ==
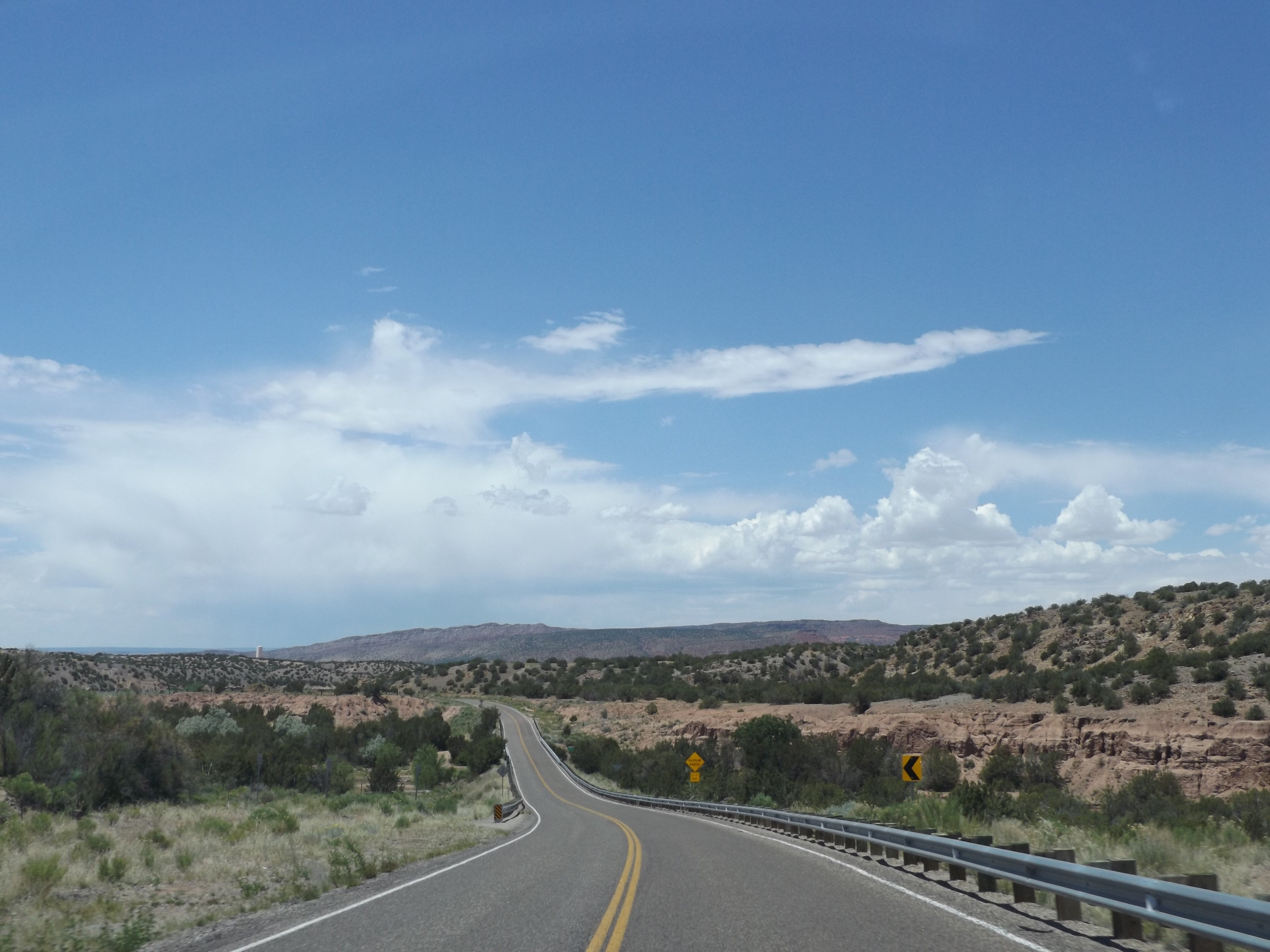
NM 290

NM 290 begins at NM 4 in Jemez Pueblo. It travels northward through rural desert terrain before ending at US Forest Service Boundary.

== Major intersections ==
The entire route is in Sandoval County.

Location	mi	km	Destinations	Notes
Jemez Pueblo	0.000	0.000	NM 4	Southern terminus
	6.060	9.753	End of route	Northern terminus, ends at US Forest Service Boundary
1.000 mi = 1.609 km; 1.000 km = 0.621 mi
