= Jemez Falls =

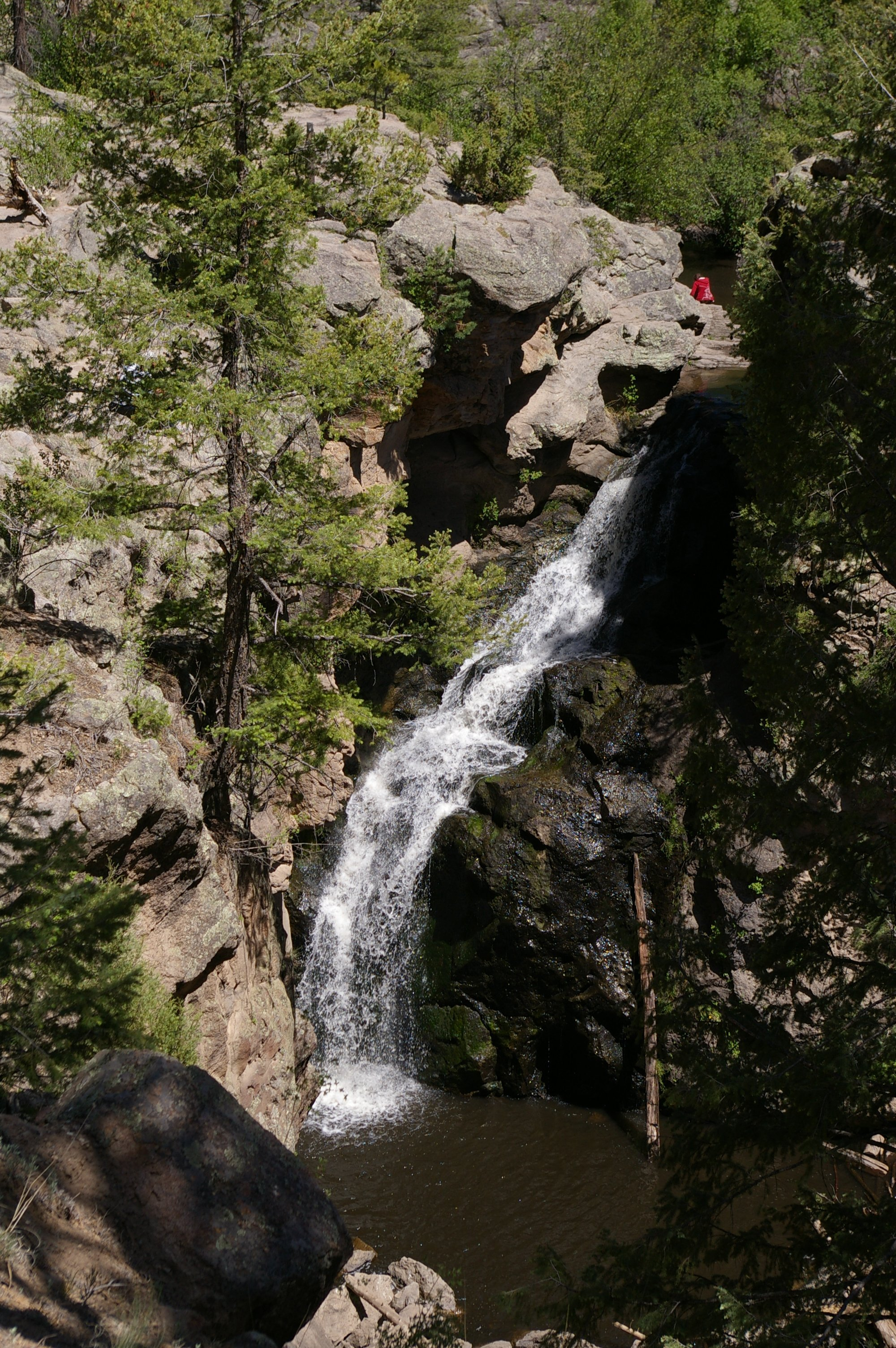
- View of Jemez Falls
- Interactive map of Jemez Falls
- Location: Sandoval County, New Mexico
- Coordinates: 35.81°N 106.60°W
- Total height: 70 feet (21 m)
- Watercourse: East Fork, Jemez River

Jemez Falls is a waterfall located in the Jemez Mountains of the Santa Fe National Forest. The falls are located on the East Fork of the Jemez River in an area dominated by Ponderosa Pine forests. Jemez Falls are the highest waterfalls in the Jemez Mountains. There are some smaller falls on the river just above the main falls. The falls are accessible from a trail that starts at the Jemez Falls campground and day use area.

There is an overlook at the end of the trail. The Jemez Falls Campground is located at an elevation of 7,880 feet above sea level. Campers should come prepared for warm days and cooler nights. The East Fork of the Jemez River is in close proximity to the campground. Because of this, it also offers nice fishing and whitewater kayaking.

Tourists believe the Jemez falls to be the most satisfying spot in New Mexico. The falls have a heavy flow especially when there is snowfall that had recently melted. The Jemez is about 70 ft, the water cascades until it twists at the bottom.

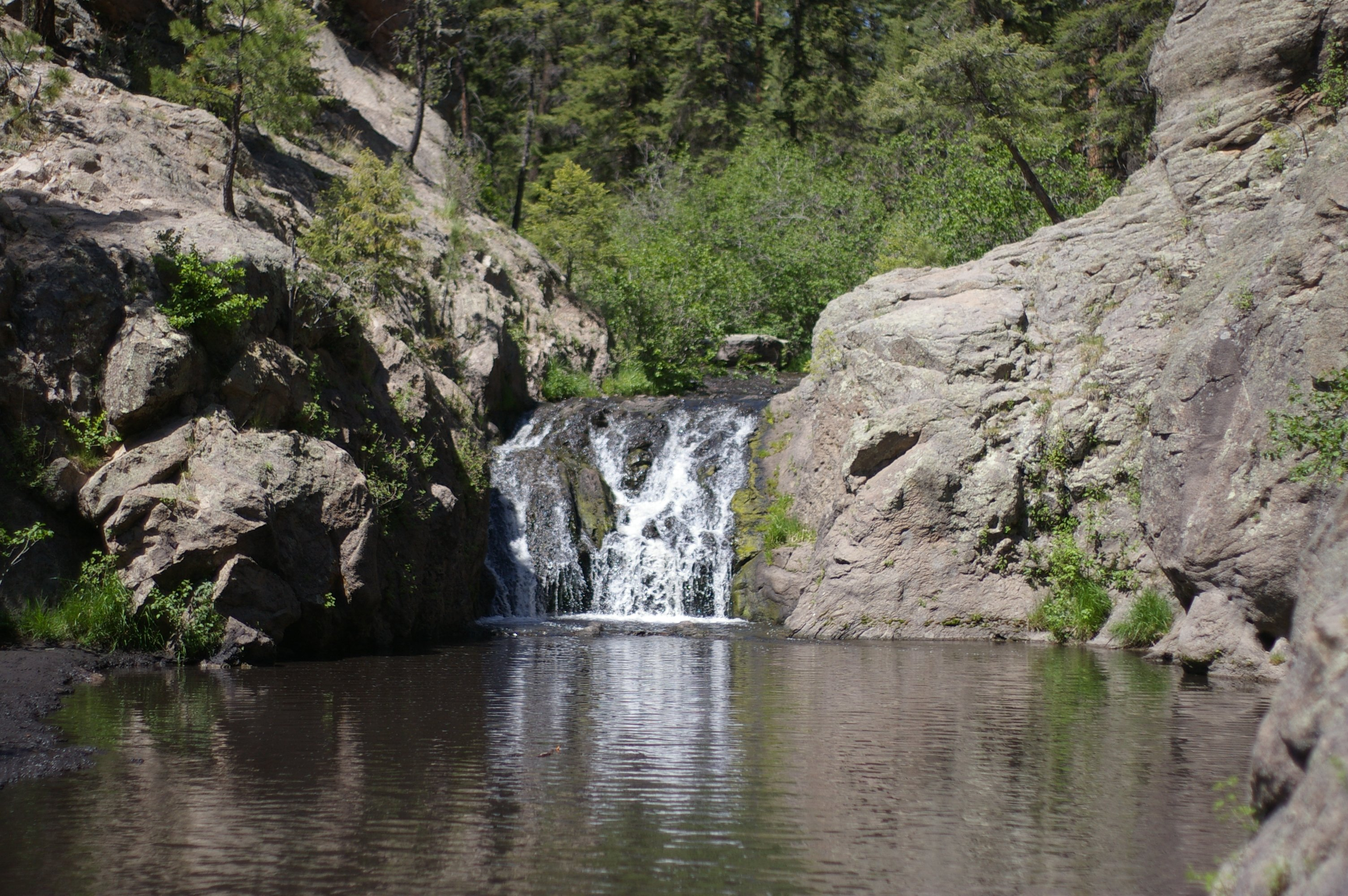
Smaller falls on the river above the main falls

== See also ==
- List of waterfalls

== Sources ==
- Four Corners Region Geotourism Map
- Santa Fe National Forest page
