= Cañon, New Mexico =

Cañon, New Mexico Gǎyų (Jemez)
- Unincorporated community
- Location within New Mexico
- Coordinates: 35°39′25″N 106°44′08″W
- Country: United States
- State: New Mexico
- County: Sandoval

Area
  - Total: 16.11 sq mi (41.73 km^{2})
  - Land: 16.11 sq mi (41.73 km^{2})
  - Water: 0 sq mi (0.00 km^{2})
- Elevation: 5,689 ft (1,734 m)

Population (2020)
  - Total: 317
  - Density: 20/sq mi (7.6/km^{2})
- Time zone: UTC-7 (Mountain (MST))
  - Summer (DST): UTC-6 (MDT)
- Area code: 505
- GNIS feature ID: 928702

Cañon (Jemez: Gǎyų) is an unincorporated community and census-designated place in Sandoval County, New Mexico, United States. As of the 2020 census, Cañon had a population of 317. New Mexico State Road 4 passes through the community.

== Geography ==
Cañon is located at 35.6569716°N 106.7355910°W. According to the U.S. Census Bureau, the community has an area of 16.111 square miles (41.73 km^{2}), all land.

== Demographics ==
Historical population
Census	Pop.	Note	%±
2020	317		—
U.S. Decennial Census

== Education ==
It is within the Jemez Valley Public Schools school district.
