= La Cueva, Sandoval County, New Mexico =

La Cueva, New Mexico
- Census-designated place
- Location within New Mexico
- Coordinates: 35°52′27″N 106°38′38″W
- Country: United States
- State: New Mexico
- County: Sandoval

Area
  - Total: 1.647 sq mi (4.27 km^{2})
  - Land: 1.647 sq mi (4.27 km^{2})
  - Water: 0 sq mi (0 km^{2})
- Elevation: 7,680 ft (2,340 m)

Population (2010)
  - Total: 168
  - Density: 102/sq mi (39.4/km^{2})
- Time zone: UTC-7 (Mountain (MST))
  - Summer (DST): UTC-6 (MDT)
- Area code: 575
- GNIS feature ID: 902763

La Cueva is a census-designated place in Sandoval County, New Mexico, United States. Its population was 168 as of the 2010 census. New Mexico State Road 126 passes through the community.

== Geography ==
La Cueva is located at 35.8742400°N 106.6439000°W. According to the U.S. Census Bureau, the community has an area of 1.647 square miles (4.27 km^{2}), all land.

== Education ==
It is within the Jemez Valley Public Schools school district.

== See also ==
- List of census-designated places in New Mexico
