= 1916 United States presidential election in New Mexico =

- November 7, 1916

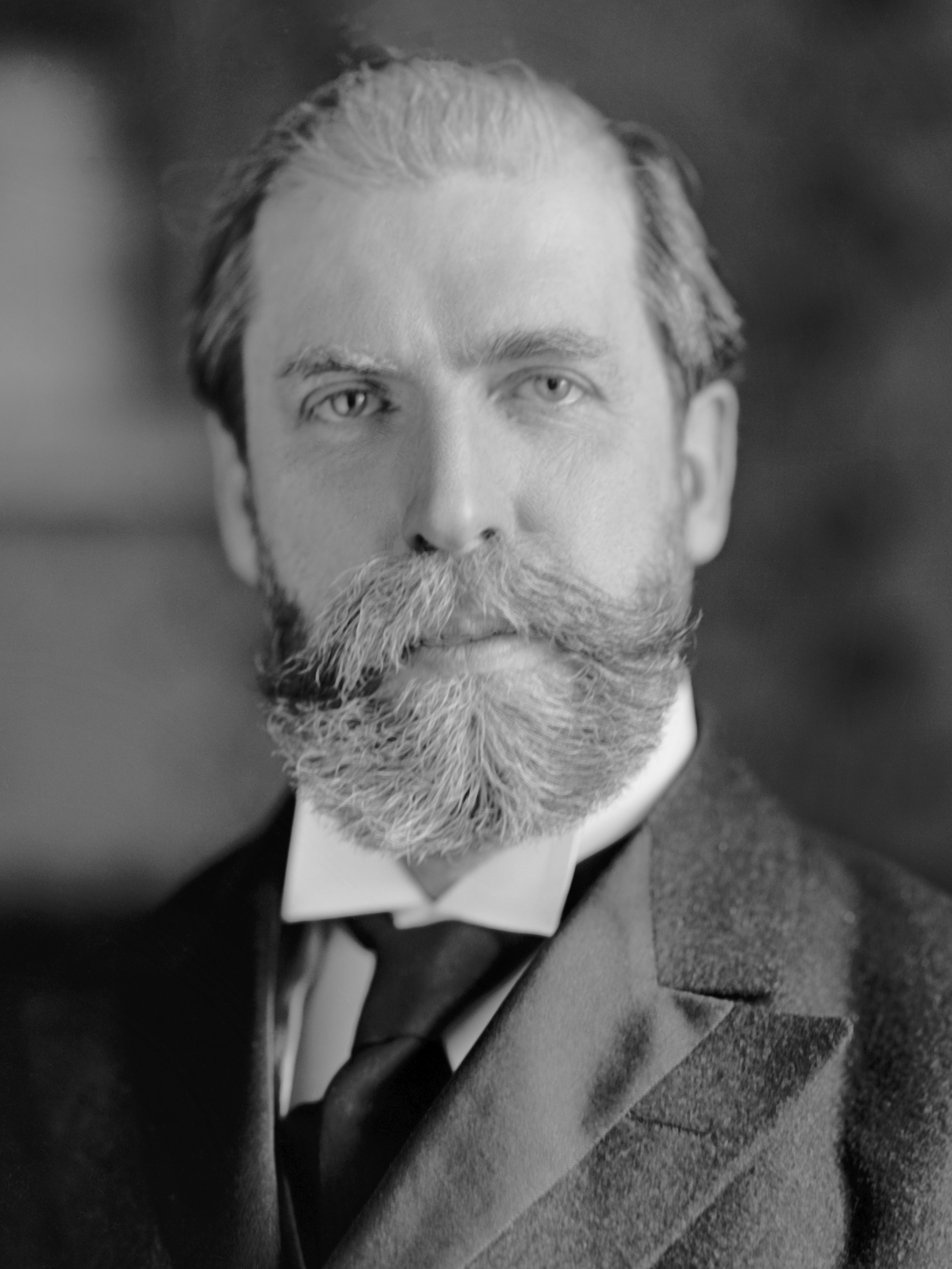
Nominee	Woodrow Wilson	Charles Evans Hughes
Party	Democratic	Republican
Home state	New Jersey	New York
Running mate	Thomas R. Marshall	Charles W. Fairbanks
Electoral vote	3	0
Popular vote	33,693	31,163
Percentage	50.31%	46.53%
County results
Wilson
50–60%
60–70%
70–80%
Hughes
40–50%
50–60%
70–80%
President before election
Woodrow Wilson
Democratic
Elected President
Woodrow Wilson
Democratic

The 1916 United States presidential election in New Mexico took place on November 7, 1916. All contemporary forty-eight states were part of 1916 United States presidential election. Voters chose three electors to represent them in the Electoral College, which voted for President and Vice President.

During the period between New Mexico's annexation by the United States and statehood, the area was divided between largely Republican machine-run highland regions and its firmly Southern Democrat and Baptist "Little Texas" region to the southeast. A split in the "Old Guard" of highland Republicanism meant that in the state's inaugural presidential election in 1912 Woodrow Wilson carried the state through overwhelming "Little Texas" and southern desert support over Progressive Theodore Roosevelt and incumbent Republican William Howard Taft. Nonetheless, New Mexico was still Taft's fourth-strongest state by vote percentage reflecting the strong Hispanic machine loyalties to him in the northern highlands.

In the East, supporters of Theodore Roosevelt's "Bull Moose" Party rapidly returned to the Republicans, in the Mountain States many if not most of these supporters turned to the Democratic Party not only in presidential elections, but also in state and federal legislative ones. Wilson was also helped by a powerful "peace vote" in the Western states due to opposition to participation in World War I.

New Mexico was won by incumbent President Woodrow Wilson, who secured a tumultuous reelection against Supreme Court Justice Charles Evans Hughes, and Socialist Party icon Allan L. Benson. Wilson's reluctance to bid armed forces in World War I improved his image for this election, as a "peace candidate". However, whilst many Progressive business leaders believed the Republican Old Guard stood for fraud and dishonesty, they nonetheless supported Hughes even whilst opposing GOP candidates for other statewide positions. Consequently, despite its strong Democratic base at a local level that was completely absent in most parts of the West during the "System of 1896", New Mexico was Wilson's third-weakest state in the West.

== Results ==
General Election Results (Note: These figures include the "Absent Railroad Vote")
Party	Pledged to	Elector	Votes
Democratic Party	Woodrow Wilson	Felix Garcia	33,693
Democratic Party	Woodrow Wilson	James N. Upton	33,649
Democratic Party	Woodrow Wilson	Jose G. Chaves	33,555
Republican Party	Charles Evans Hughes	C. L. Hill	31,163
Republican Party	Charles Evans Hughes	Juan Ortiz	31,097
Republican Party	Charles Evans Hughes	H. J. Hammond	31,035
Socialist Party	Allan L. Benson	Ira N. Crisp	1,999
Socialist Party	Allan L. Benson	W. T. Holmes	1,997
Socialist Party	Allan L. Benson	McB. Smith	1,977
Prohibition Party	Frank Hanly	Lester Sands	112
Prohibition Party	Frank Hanly	F. C. Peterson	109
Prohibition Party	Frank Hanly	W. G. Ogilvie	108
Votes cast (Note: Based on totals for highest elector on each ticket)			66,967

=== Results by county ===
County	Woodrow Wilson Democratic		Charles Evans Hughes Republican		Allan L. Benson Socialist		Frank Hanly Prohibition		Margin		Total votes cast (Note: Based on the highest elector on each ticket)
County	#	%	#	%	#	%	#	%	#	%	Total votes cast
Bernalillo	2,399	46.17%	2,714	52.23%	77	1.48%	6	0.12%	-315	-6.06%	5,196
Chaves	2,279	68.40%	862	25.87%	186	5.58%	5	0.15%	1,417	42.53%	3,332
Colfax	2,024	51.87%	1,839	47.13%	38	0.97%	1	0.03%	185	4.74%	3,902
Curry	1,205	63.89%	356	18.88%	323	17.13%	2	0.11%	849	45.02%	1,886
Doña Ana	1,079	39.86%	1,606	59.33%	22	0.81%	0	0.00%	-527	-19.47%	2,707
Eddy	1,405	72.61%	425	21.96%	99	5.12%	6	0.31%	980	50.65%	1,935
Grant	2,305	53.93%	1,869	43.73%	96	2.25%	4	0.09%	436	10.20%	4,274
Guadalupe	1,173	51.54%	1,067	46.88%	36	1.58%	0	0.00%	106	4.66%	2,276
Lincoln	870	48.25%	889	49.31%	43	2.38%	1	0.06%	-19	-1.05%	1,803
Luna	796	63.02%	418	33.10%	45	3.56%	4	0.32%	378	29.93%	1,263
McKinley	564	45.48%	669	53.95%	2	0.16%	5	0.40%	-105	-8.47%	1,240
Mora	1,505	48.42%	1,590	51.16%	13	0.42%	0	0.00%	-85	-2.73%	3,108
Otero	824	54.39%	561	37.03%	128	8.45%	2	0.13%	263	17.36%	1,515
Quay	1,562	64.55%	598	24.71%	234	9.67%	26	1.07%	964	39.83%	2,420
Rio Arriba	1,528	43.40%	1,992	56.57%	1	0.03%	0	0.00%	-464	-13.18%	3,521
Roosevelt	1,088	73.56%	230	15.55%	150	10.14%	11	0.74%	858	58.01%	1,479
San Juan	637	59.64%	385	36.05%	46	4.31%	0	0.00%	252	23.60%	1,068
San Miguel	2,263	43.24%	2,933	56.04%	29	0.55%	9	0.17%	-670	-12.80%	5,234
Sandoval	734	54.57%	611	45.43%	0	0.00%	0	0.00%	123	9.14%	1,345
Santa Fe	1,406	43.16%	1,830	56.17%	15	0.46%	7	0.21%	-424	-13.01%	3,258
Sierra	493	50.51%	460	47.13%	23	2.36%	0	0.00%	33	3.38%	976
Socorro	1,575	44.33%	1,956	55.05%	16	0.45%	6	0.17%	-381	-10.72%	3,553
Taos	910	39.95%	1,320	57.95%	46	2.02%	2	0.09%	-410	-18.00%	2,278
Torrance	679	39.99%	948	55.83%	68	4.00%	3	0.18%	-269	-15.84%	1,698
Union	1,996	53.24%	1,495	39.88%	246	6.56%	12	0.32%	501	13.36%	3,749
Valencia	394	20.19%	1,540	78.93%	17	0.87%	0	0.00%	-1,146	-58.74%	1,951
Total	33,693	50.31%	31,163	46.53%	1,999	2.99%	112	0.17%	2,530	3.78%	66,967

==== Counties that flipped from Progressive to Democratic ====
- Sandoval

==== Counties that flipped from Democratic to Republican ====
- Lincoln
- Socorro

==== Counties that flipped from Progressive to Republican ====
- Bernalillo
