= T'siya Day School =

School in Zia Pueblo, New Mexico, U.S.

Coordinates: 35.5098°N 106.7083°W

T'siya Day School, previously spelled Zia Day School, is a Bureau of Indian Education (BIE)-operated school in Zia Pueblo, New Mexico. It covers elementary school grades.

== History ==
The school first opened in 1929. The original building had two rooms, and was made of adobe.

Evelyn Page, who lived in the pueblo, served as principal until her death, at 55 years of age, in 1964.

A gymnasium and another group of classrooms were installed in the 1970s.

In 1997 there were 58 students. By 1997 the school's condition had deteriorated, and four portable buildings had the majority of school activity. In 1998 there were 71 students. At that time community members asked for a new school; at that time 24 students in the area were attending standard public schools even though they could attend Zia Day School if they wanted to; according to Lawrence Wright, the principal, the poor condition of the Zia Day School buildings was the major factor. After he visited the school in 1998, Bruce Babbitt, the Secretary of the Interior, stated that he would advocate for a new school.

In 2001 the Bureau of Indian Affairs (BIA) announced that circa 2002 a new school facility for Zia Day School will open. The building, with a capacity of 157, was to have 44,425 square feet (4,127.2 m^{2}) of space and have a cost of $7,600,000. Its student capacity was to be over two times as large as that of the previous facility.

== Curriculum ==
The curriculum included instruction in the Keres language.
