= Jemez Valley Public Schools =

School district in New Mexico, United States

Location
- Sandoval County, New Mexico Northern New Mexico; Jemez Mountains

District information
- Type: Public
- Motto: "Caring Community Schools, Providing Every Student, Opportunities for Success"
- Grades: preK-12
- Superintendent: Dr. Eudora Camata

Students and staff
- Students: 364

Other information
- Website: www.jvps.org

Jemez Valley Public Schools is a public school district headquartered in unincorporated Sandoval County, New Mexico, United States; the facility has a Jemez Pueblo postal address, but it is outside of (north of) the Jemez Pueblo census-designated place.

With a total area of 1,115 square miles (2,890 km^{2}), it has territory in central Sandoval County. The school district has a total of 4 schools: 1 high school, 1 middle school, 1 elementary school, and 1 charter school.

== Service area ==
Jemez Valley Public Schools serves: Cañon, Jemez Pueblo, Jemez Springs, La Cueva, San Ysidro, Zia Pueblo, most of Ponderosa, and small sections of Rio Rancho, Rio Rancho Estates, and Santa Ana Pueblo. It also serves the neighboring communities of Sierra Los Pinos and Gilman.

== Schools ==
Zoned:

- Jemez Valley High School
- Jemez Valley Middle School
- Jemez Valley Elementary School

Charter school

- San Diego Riverside Charter School
