= Zia Pueblo, New Mexico =

Zia Pueblo, New Mexico Tsi'ya, Ts'iiy'a (Eastern Keres)
- Census-designated place
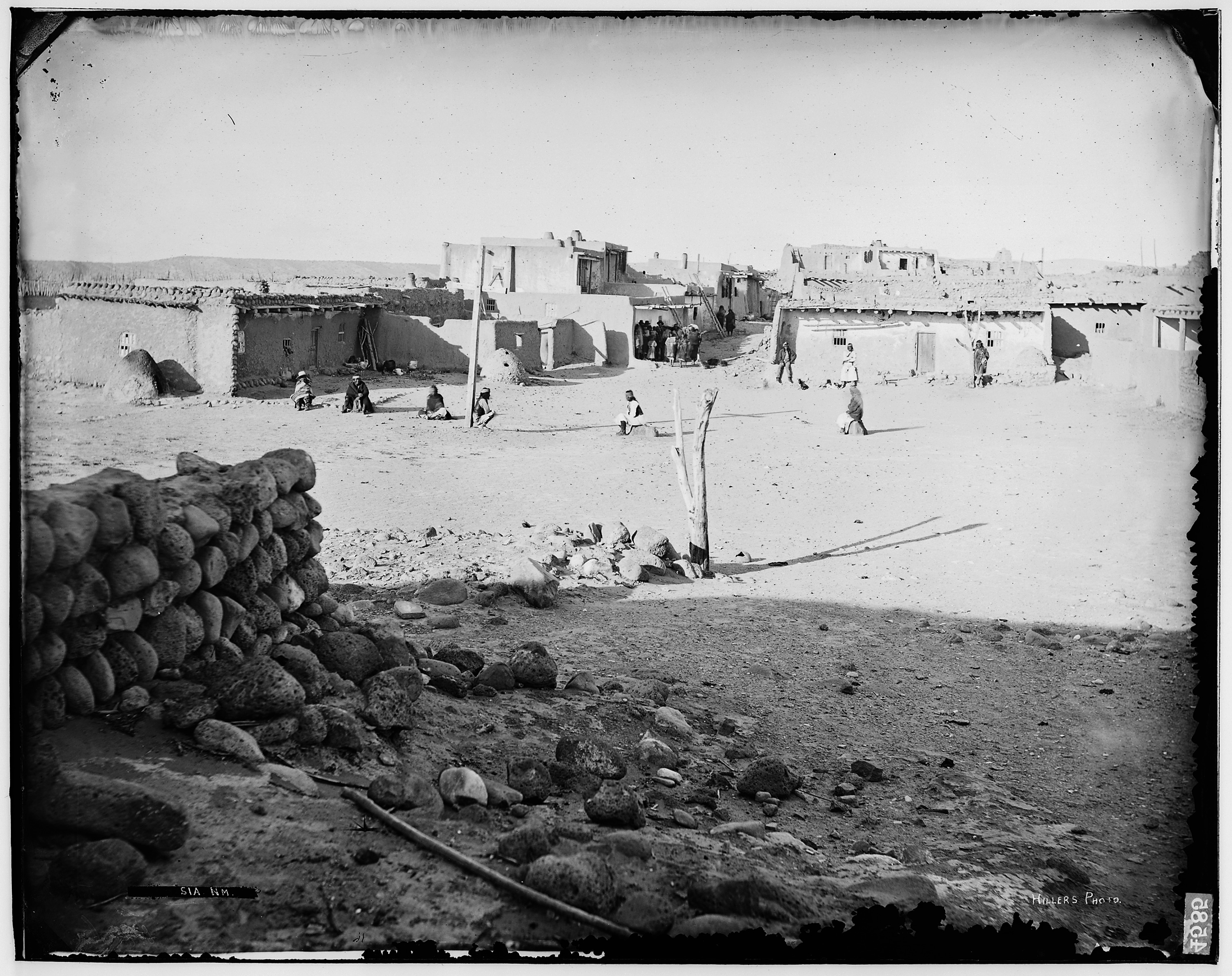
- Zia Pueblo in the late 1800s.

- Flag

- Location of Zia Pueblo, Sandoval County, New Mexico

- Location in the United States
- Coordinates: 35°30′13″N 106°43′24″W
- Country: United States
- State: New Mexico
- County: Sandoval

Area
  - Total: 27.07 sq mi (70.12 km^{2})
  - Land: 27.03 sq mi (70.01 km^{2})
  - Water: 0.046 sq mi (0.12 km^{2})
- Elevation: 5,472 ft (1,668 m)

Population (2020)
  - Total: 760
  - Density: 28.1/sq mi (10.86/km^{2})
- Time zone: UTC-7 (Mountain (MST))
  - Summer (DST): UTC-6 (MDT)
- ZIP code: 87053
- Area code: 505
- FIPS code: 35-86420
- GNIS feature ID: 0928840
- Zia Pueblo
- U.S. National Register of Historic Places
- U.S. Historic district
- NM State Register of Cultural Properties
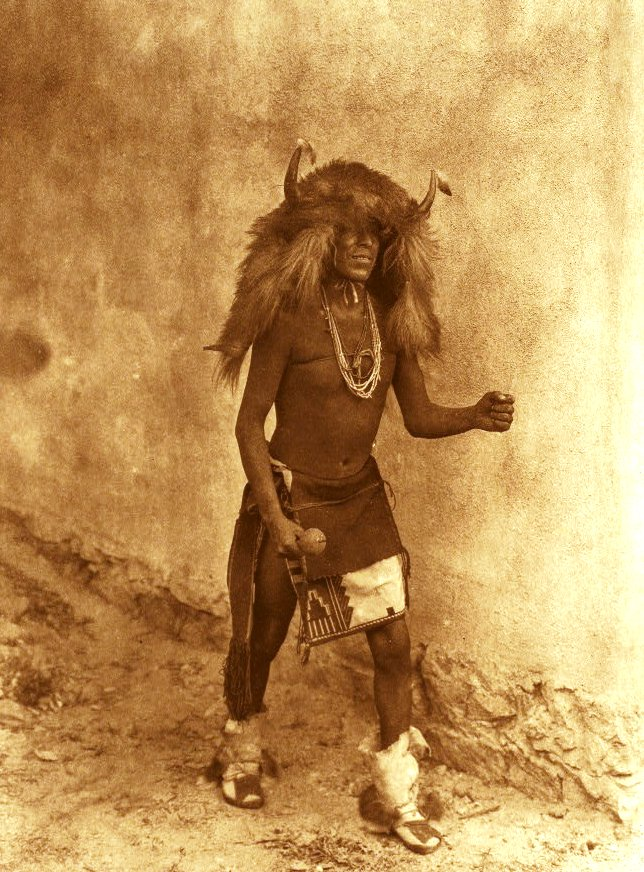
- Zia buffalo dancer
- Nearest city: Bernalillo, New Mexico
- Area: 26 acres (11 ha)
- Architectural style: Pueblo
- NRHP reference No.: 73001146
- NMSRCP No.: 232

Significant dates
- Added to NRHP: April 3, 1973
- Designated NMSRCP: December 30, 1971

Zia Pueblo (Eastern Keres: Tsi'ya, Ts'iiy'a, Spanish: Pueblo de Zía) is a census-designated place (CDP) in Sandoval County, New Mexico, United States. As of the 2020 census, Zia Pueblo had a population of 760. The pueblo after which the CDP is named is included within the CDP; it is listed on the National Register of Historic Places.

Zia Pueblo is part of the Albuquerque metropolitan area.

== Geography ==
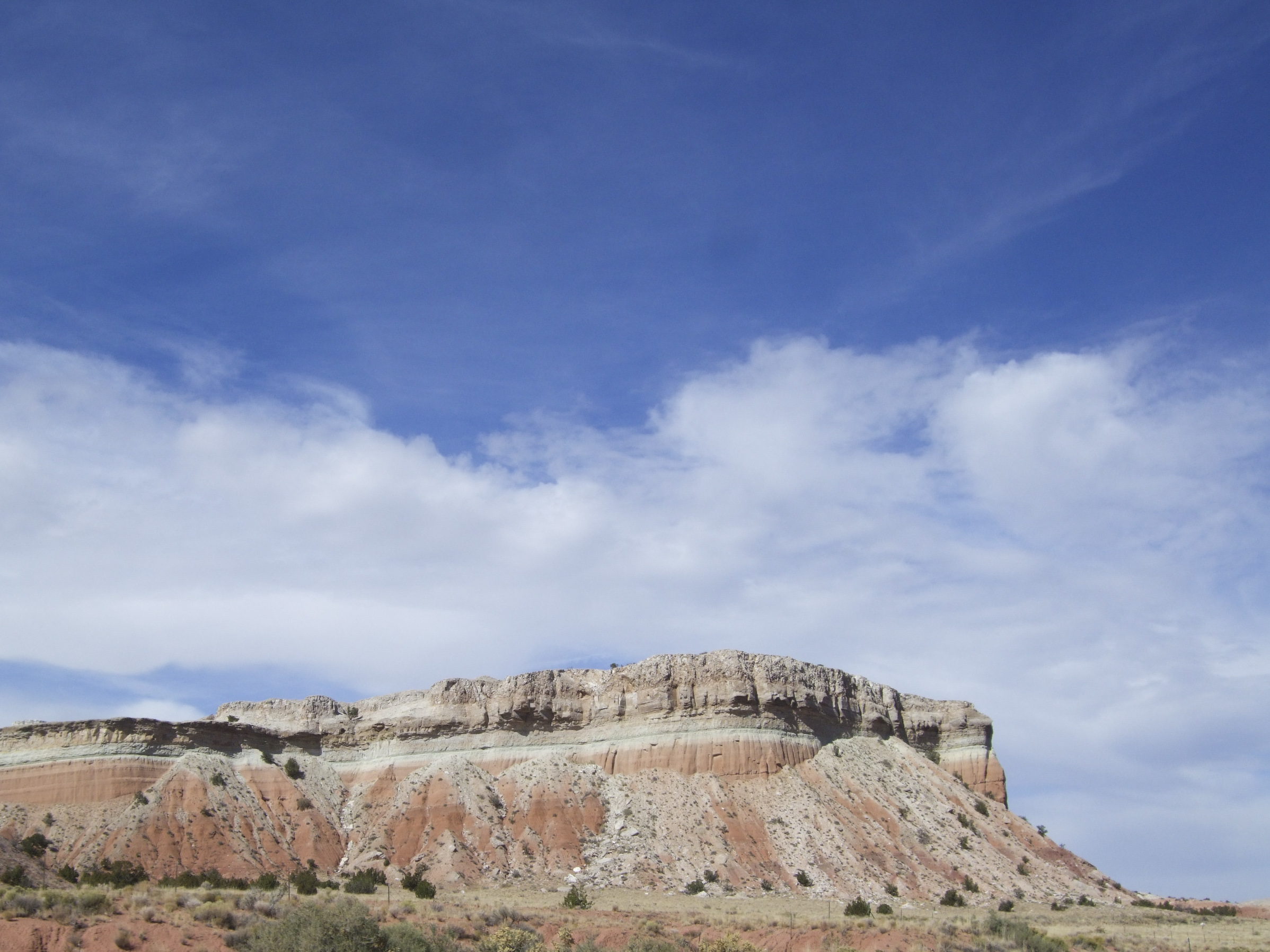
Land formation on the Zia Pueblo, November 2008

According to the United States Census Bureau, the CDP has a total area of 27.3 square miles (70.8 km^{2}), of which 27.3 square miles (70.7 km^{2}) is land and 0.04 square mile (0.1 km^{2}) (0.15%) is water.

== Demographics ==
Historical population
Census	Pop.	Note	%±
2020	760		—
U.S. Decennial Census

As of the census of 2000, there were 646 people, 155 households, and 137 families residing in the CDP. The population density was 23.7 people per square mile (9.1/km^{2}). There were 189 housing units at an average density of 6.9 per square mile (2.7/km^{2}). The racial makeup of the CDP was 99.85% Native American, and 0.15% from two or more races. Hispanic of any race were 0.46% of the population.

There were 155 households, out of which 43.9% had children under the age of 18 living with them, 43.9% were married couples living together, 37.4% had a female householder with no husband present, and 11.0% were non-families. 10.3% of all households were made up of individuals, and 1.3% had someone living alone who was 65 years of age or older. The average household size was 4.17 and the average family size was 4.38.

In the CDP, the population was spread out, with 34.8% under the age of 18, 12.4% from 18 to 24, 28.5% from 25 to 44, 18.3% from 45 to 64, and 6.0% who were 65 years of age or older. The median age was 27 years. For every 100 females, there were 92.3 males. For every 100 females age 18 and over, there were 87.1 males.

The median income for a household in the CDP was $34,583, and the median income for a family was $37,679. Males had a median income of $20,313 versus $19,271 for females. The per capita income for the CDP was $8,689. About 15.0% of families and 15.4% of the population were below the poverty line, including 18.6% of those under age 18 and 9.1% of those age 65 or over.

== Education ==
It is within the Jemez Valley Public Schools school district.

The Bureau of Indian Education (BIE) operates the T'siya Day School (formerly Zia Day School), a federal elementary school for Native Americans, in Zia Pueblo.

== Government ==
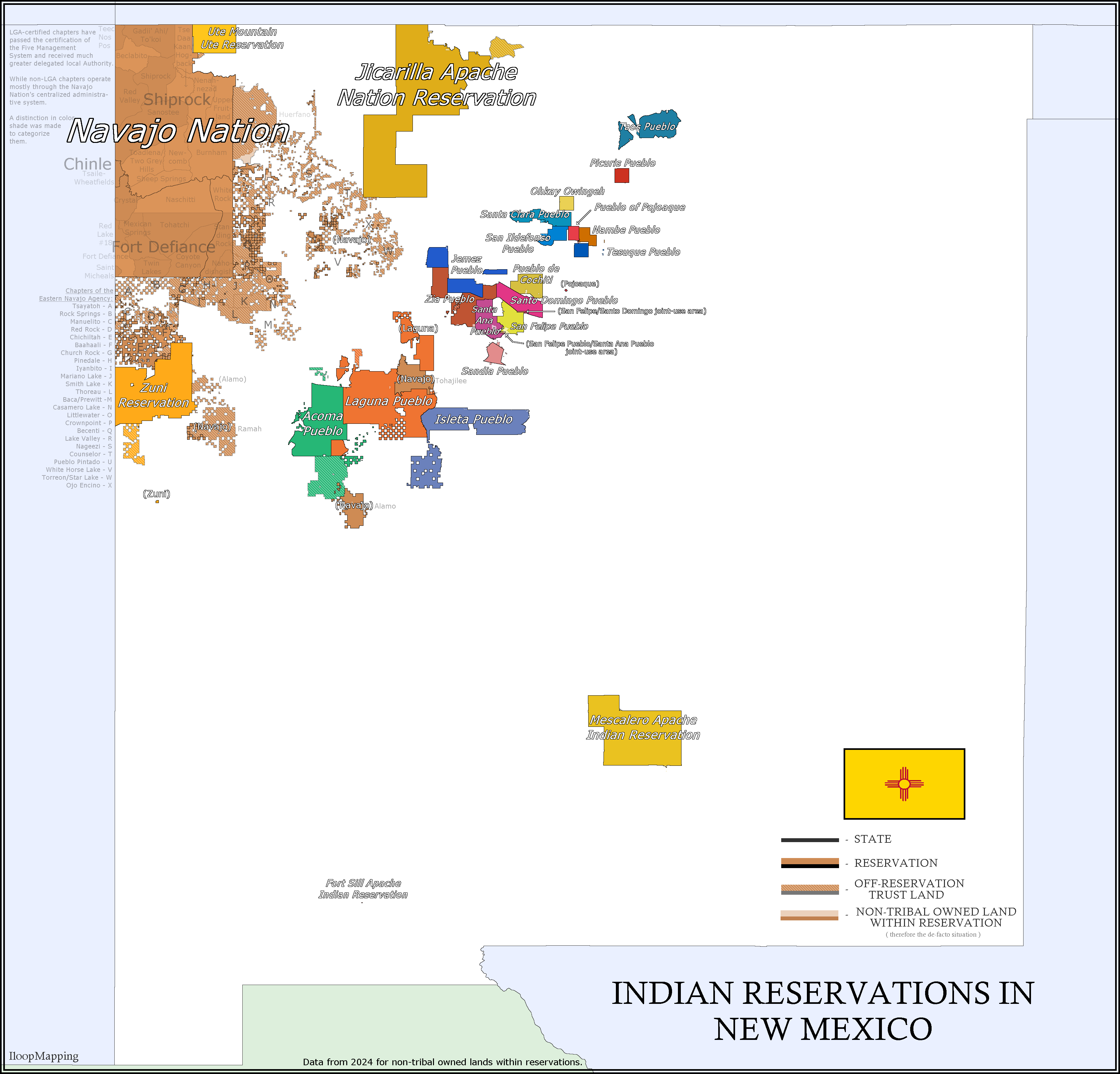
Map of the Zia and neighboring tribes (In dark orange).

The administration of the Pueblo of Zia in 2025 is:

- Governor: Lambert Pino
- Lieutenant Governor: Byron Shije

== See also ==
- List of census-designated places in New Mexico
- Zia people (New Mexico)
- National Register of Historic Places listings in Sandoval County, New Mexico
