= Sandoval County, New Mexico =

County in New Mexico, United States

- County
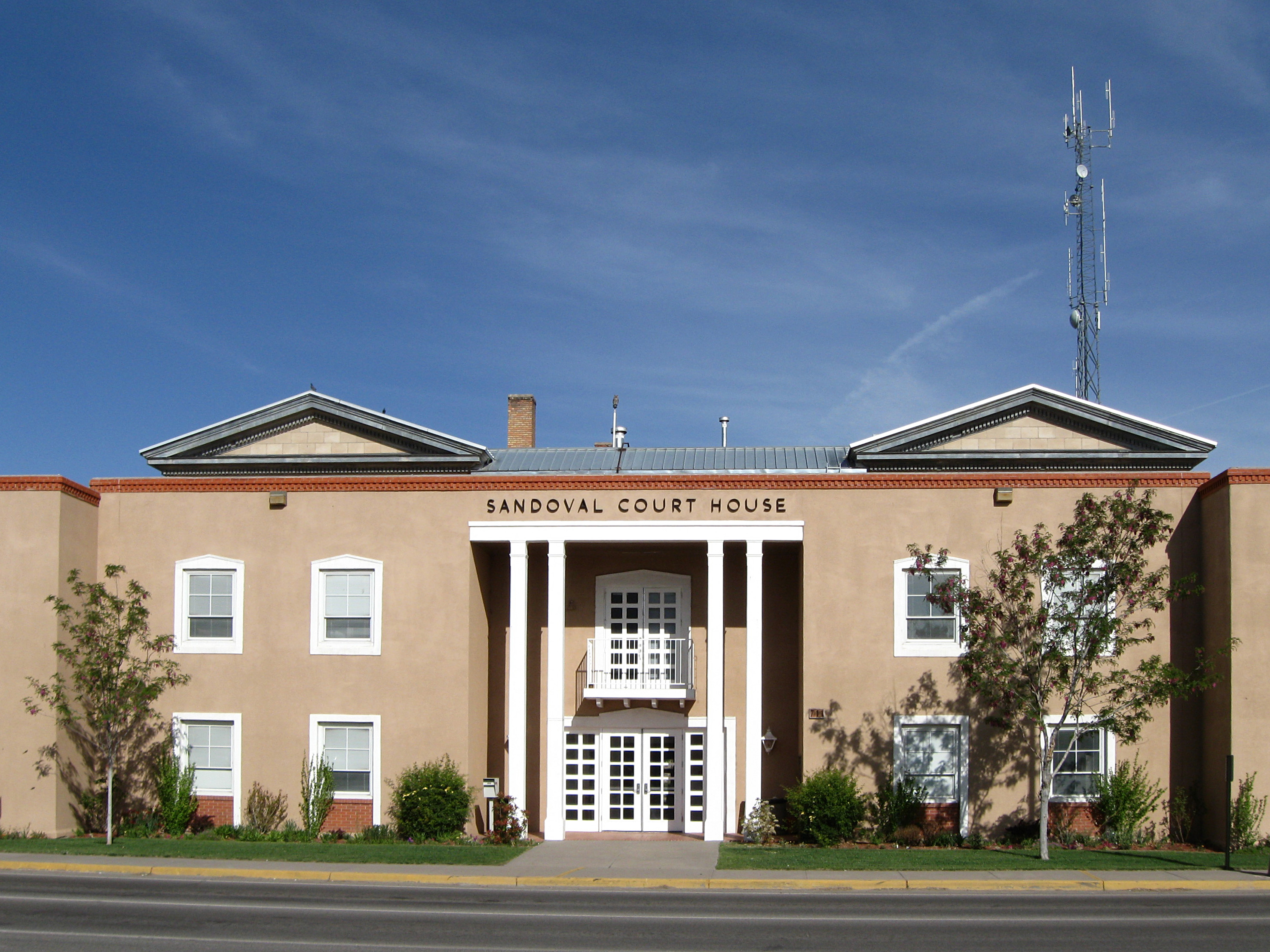
- Sandoval County Courthouse in Bernalillo

- Seal

- Location within the U.S. state of New Mexico
- Coordinates: 35°41′N 106°51′W
- Country: United States
- State: New Mexico
- Founded: 1903
- Named for: Sandoval family
- Seat: Bernalillo
- Largest city: Rio Rancho

Area
  - Total: 3,716 sq mi (9,620 km^{2})
  - Land: 3,711 sq mi (9,610 km^{2})
  - Water: 5.3 sq mi (14 km^{2}) 0.1%

Population (2020)
  - Total: 148,834
  - Estimate (2025): 159,565 ▲
  - Density: 35/sq mi (14/km^{2})
- Time zone: UTC−7 (Mountain)
  - Summer (DST): UTC−6 (MDT)
- Congressional districts: 1st, 3rd
- Website: www.sandovalcountynm.gov

Sandoval County (Spanish: Condado de Sandoval) is a county located in the U.S. state of New Mexico. As of the 2020 census, the population was 148,834, making it the fourth-most populous county in New Mexico. The county seat is Bernalillo.

Sandoval County is part of the Albuquerque metropolitan area.

== History ==
Sandoval County was created in 1903 from the northern part of Bernalillo County. Its name comes from one of the large land-holding Spanish families in the area. The original county seat was Corrales, but it was moved to Bernalillo in 1905.

Mormon Battalion Monument (New Mexico) is in the county.

== Geography ==
According to the U.S. Census Bureau, the county has a total area of 3,716 square miles (9,620 km^{2}), of which 3,711 square miles (9,610 km^{2}) is land and 5.3 square miles (14 km^{2}) (0.1%) is water. The highest point in the county is the summit of Redondo Peak, at 11,254 feet (3,430 m).

A relatively small portion of the county exists as a geographically separate exclave between Los Alamos County and Santa Fe County. This came about when Los Alamos County was created; the land that became the exclave would have been part of Los Alamos but was excluded owing to its sacred status among the local Indians. Rather than be ceded to neighboring Santa Fe (or Los Alamos) it has remained part of Sandoval, and is owned by the Bureau of Indian Affairs and under the care of the San Ildefonso Pueblo.

=== Adjacent counties ===
- Rio Arriba County - north
- Los Alamos County - northeast (west of the exclave)
- Santa Fe County - east (in two locations near Los Alamos County including the exclave)
- Bernalillo County - south
- Cibola County - southwest
- McKinley County - west
- San Juan County - northwest

=== Native American Reservations ===
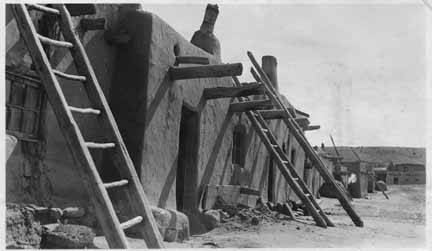
Northside of Jemez Pueblo, New Mexico, 1915

Sandoval County has 12 Indian reservations and two joint-use areas lying within its borders. This is the second highest number of reservations of any county in the United States (after San Diego County, California, which has 18 reservations.) Riverside County, California also has 12 reservations, but no joint-use areas.

- Cochiti Pueblo (partly in Santa Fe County)
- Jemez Pueblo
- Jicarilla Apache Indian Reservation (partly in Rio Arriba County)
- Laguna Pueblo (partly in Bernalillo, Cibola and Valencia Counties)
- Navajo Nation (extending into six other counties in New Mexico, plus three in Arizona and one in Utah)
- San Felipe Pueblo
- San Felipe/Santa Ana joint use area
- San Felipe/Santo Domingo joint use area
- San Ildefonso Pueblo (partly in Santa Fe County)
- Sandia Pueblo (partly in Bernalillo County)
- Santa Ana Pueblo
- Santa Clara Pueblo (partly in Rio Arriba and Santa Fe counties)
- Santo Domingo Pueblo (partly in Santa Fe County)
- Zia Pueblo

=== National protected areas ===
- Bandelier National Monument (part)
- Cibola National Forest (part)
- El Camino Real de Tierra Adentro National Historic Trail (part)
- Kasha-Katuwe Tent Rocks National Monument
- Santa Fe National Forest (part)
- Valles Caldera National Preserve (part)

== Demographics ==
Historical population
| Census | Pop. | Note | %± |
|---|---|---|---|
| 1910 | 8,579 | | — |
| 1920 | 8,863 | | 3.3% |
| 1930 | 11,144 | | 25.7% |
| 1940 | 13,898 | | 24.7% |
| 1950 | 12,438 | | −10.5% |
| 1960 | 14,201 | | 14.2% |
| 1970 | 17,492 | | 23.2% |
| 1980 | 34,799 | | 98.9% |
| 1990 | 63,319 | | 82.0% |
| 2000 | 89,908 | | 42.0% |
| 2010 | 131,561 | | 46.3% |
| 2020 | 148,834 | | 13.1% |
| 2025 (est.) | 159,565 | ▲ | 7.2% |
U.S. Decennial Census; 1790–1960 1900–1990; 1990–2000 2010–2016

=== 2020 census ===
As of the 2020 census, the county had a population of 148,834. The median age was 41.2 years. 23.4% of residents were under the age of 18 and 19.6% of residents were 65 years of age or older. For every 100 females there were 95.1 males, and for every 100 females age 18 and over there were 91.8 males age 18 and over.

Sandoval County, New Mexico – Racial and ethnic composition Note: the US Census treats Hispanic/Latino as an ethnic category. This table excludes Latinos from the racial categories and assigns them to a separate category. Hispanics/Latinos may be of any race.
| Race / Ethnicity (NH = Non-Hispanic) | Pop 2000 | Pop 2010 | Pop 2020 | % 2000 | % 2010 | % 2020 |
|---|---|---|---|---|---|---|
| White alone (NH) | 45,227 | 62,445 | 63,426 | 50.30% | 47.46% | 42.61% |
| Black or African American alone (NH) | 1,418 | 2,462 | 2,823 | 1.58% | 1.87% | 1.90% |
| Native American or Alaska Native alone (NH) | 14,239 | 16,006 | 16,891 | 15.84% | 12.17% | 11.35% |
| Asian alone (NH) | 857 | 1,763 | 2,320 | 0.95% | 1.34% | 1.56% |
| Pacific Islander alone (NH) | 86 | 135 | 166 | 0.10% | 0.10% | 0.11% |
| Other race alone (NH) | 206 | 275 | 679 | 0.23% | 0.21% | 0.46% |
| Mixed race or Multiracial (NH) | 1,438 | 2,346 | 4,912 | 1.60% | 1.78% | 3.30% |
| Hispanic or Latino (any race) | 26,437 | 46,129 | 57,617 | 29.40% | 35.06% | 38.71% |
| Total | 89,908 | 131,561 | 148,834 | 100.00% | 100.00% | 100.00% |

The racial makeup of the county was 54.8% White, 2.2% Black or African American, 12.3% American Indian and Alaska Native, 1.7% Asian, 0.2% Native Hawaiian and Pacific Islander, 10.6% from some other race, and 18.2% from two or more races. Hispanic or Latino residents of any race comprised 38.7% of the population.

80.8% of residents lived in urban areas, while 19.2% lived in rural areas.

There were 54,856 households in the county, of which 32.8% had children under the age of 18 living with them and 25.0% had a female householder with no spouse or partner present. About 22.4% of all households were made up of individuals and 10.9% had someone living alone who was 65 years of age or older.

There were 58,603 housing units, of which 6.4% were vacant. Among occupied housing units, 81.9% were owner-occupied and 18.1% were renter-occupied. The homeowner vacancy rate was 1.2% and the rental vacancy rate was 6.4%.

=== 2010 census ===
As of the 2010 census, there were 131,561 people, 47,602 households, and 34,548 families living in the county. The population density was 35.5 inhabitants per square mile (13.7/km^{2}). There were 52,287 housing units at an average density of 14.1 per square mile (5.4/km^{2}). The racial makeup of the county was 68.0% white, 12.9% American Indian, 2.1% black or African American, 1.5% Asian, 0.1% Pacific islander, 11.5% from other races, and 3.9% from two or more races. Those of Hispanic or Latino origin made up 35.1% of the population. In terms of ancestry, 13.2% were German, 9.3% were Irish, 8.7% were English, and 3.3% were American.

Of the 47,602 households, 37.6% had children under the age of 18 living with them, 53.9% were married couples living together, 12.5% had a female householder with no husband present, 27.4% were non-families, and 22.0% of all households were made up of individuals. The average household size was 2.75 and the average family size was 3.22. The median age was 37.9 years.

The median income for a household in the county was $57,158 and the median income for a family was $65,906. Males had a median income of $48,967 versus $35,101 for females. The per capita income for the county was $25,979. About 8.3% of families and 11.4% of the population were below the poverty line, including 14.0% of those under age 18 and 10.8% of those age 65 or over.

=== 2000 census ===
As of the 2000 census, there were 89,908 people, 31,411 households, and 23,621 families living in the county. The population density was 24 people per square mile (9.3 people/km^{2}). There were 34,866 housing units at an average density of 9 per square mile (3.5/km^{2}). The racial makeup of the county was 65.08% White, 16.28% Native American, 1.71% Black or African American, 0.99% Asian, 0.11% Pacific Islander, 12.37% from other races, and 3.47% from two or more races. 29.40% of the population were Hispanic or Latino of any race.

There were 31,411 households, out of which 38.60% had children under the age of 18 living with them, 57.70% were married couples living together, 12.20% had a female householder with no husband present, and 24.80% were non-families. 19.90% of all households were made up of individuals, and 6.90% had someone living alone who was 65 years of age or older. The average household size was 2.84 and the average family size was 3.29.

In the county, the population was spread out, with 29.60% under the age of 18, 7.50% from 18 to 24, 30.10% from 25 to 44, 22.20% from 45 to 64, and 10.60% who were 65 years of age or older. The median age was 35 years. For every 100 females there were 95.20 males. For every 100 females age 18 and over, there were 91.70 males.

The median income for a household in the county was $44,949, and the median income for a family was $48,984. Males had a median income of $36,791 versus $26,565 for females. The per capita income for the county was $19,174. About 9.00% of families and 12.10% of the population were below the poverty line, including 15.60% of those under age 18 and 9.20% of those age 65 or over.

== Communities ==
=== City ===
- Rio Rancho

=== Towns ===
- Bernalillo (county seat)
- Edgewood (part)

=== Villages ===
- Corrales
- Cuba
- Jemez Springs
- San Ysidro

=== Census-designated places ===
- Algodones
- Cañon
- Cochiti
- Cochiti Lake
- Jemez Pueblo
- La Cueva
- La Jara
- La Madera
- Peña Blanca
- Placitas
- Ponderosa
- Pueblo of Sandia Village
- Regina
- Rio Rancho Estates
- San Felipe Pueblo
- San Luis
- Santa Ana Pueblo
- Santo Domingo Pueblo
- Torreon
- Zia Pueblo

=== Unincorporated communities ===
- Counselor
- Kewa Pueblo

== Politics ==
Since New Mexico obtained statehood in 1912, Sandoval county has been remarkably accurate in predicting the winner of each presidential race. The only elections where Sandoval County failed to back the overall winner were in 1912 (Theodore Roosevelt won the county on the Bull Moose ticket), 1944, 1968, 2016, and 2024. Hillary Clinton won a plurality, but not majority, of votes in Sandoval county in 2016 due to Gary Johnson (who previously served as Governor of New Mexico) winning an abnormally high number of votes that election. Since 2004, Sandoval County has voted more consistently Democratic in presidential elections, though at narrower margins than nearby Bernalillo County.

Most parts of the city of Rio Rancho vote majority Republican and this is where this party's strength lies. Otherwise, the more remote parts of the Jemez Mountains and the town of Cuba trend Republican. However, this is offset by Corrales, Placitas, San Ysidro, and all the Pueblos in the county, as well as many other rural areas which trend Democratic. Cochiti Pueblo in particular is the most Democratic region in the county. Bernalillo has also long been a strongly Democratic region, though in the 2024 election it saw a large shift toward the Republican party, as did the pueblos of Zia and Kewa (Santo Domingo) in particular. Yet the fact that a number of precincts in Corrales and north-central Rio Rancho shifted further toward the left meant that the results of the 2024 election in this county only shifted to the right about 1.2 points from 2020.

United States presidential election results for Sandoval County, New Mexico
| Year | Republican | | Democratic | | Third party(ies) | |
| Year | No. | % | No. | % | No. | % |
|---|---|---|---|---|---|---|
| 1912 | 211 | 22.93% | 126 | 13.70% | 583 | 63.37% |
| 1916 | 611 | 45.43% | 734 | 54.57% | 0 | 0.00% |
| 1920 | 1,194 | 57.46% | 884 | 42.54% | 0 | 0.00% |
| 1924 | 1,587 | 58.52% | 1,096 | 40.41% | 29 | 1.07% |
| 1928 | 1,700 | 59.44% | 1,159 | 40.52% | 1 | 0.03% |
| 1932 | 1,562 | 46.24% | 1,808 | 53.52% | 8 | 0.24% |
| 1936 | 1,800 | 46.18% | 2,094 | 53.72% | 4 | 0.10% |
| 1940 | 1,990 | 49.12% | 2,060 | 50.85% | 1 | 0.02% |
| 1944 | 1,439 | 51.48% | 1,354 | 48.44% | 2 | 0.07% |
| 1948 | 1,675 | 47.33% | 1,851 | 52.30% | 13 | 0.37% |
| 1952 | 1,795 | 52.06% | 1,647 | 47.77% | 6 | 0.17% |
| 1956 | 1,979 | 55.68% | 1,574 | 44.29% | 1 | 0.03% |
| 1960 | 1,447 | 35.13% | 2,672 | 64.87% | 0 | 0.00% |
| 1964 | 1,077 | 24.37% | 3,332 | 75.38% | 11 | 0.25% |
| 1968 | 1,959 | 41.43% | 2,609 | 55.18% | 160 | 3.38% |
| 1972 | 3,507 | 50.25% | 3,293 | 47.18% | 179 | 2.56% |
| 1976 | 4,110 | 44.34% | 5,072 | 54.72% | 87 | 0.94% |
| 1980 | 6,762 | 53.74% | 4,740 | 37.67% | 1,080 | 8.58% |
| 1984 | 9,005 | 55.43% | 7,080 | 43.58% | 161 | 0.99% |
| 1988 | 9,411 | 49.50% | 9,332 | 49.09% | 268 | 1.41% |
| 1992 | 8,491 | 36.02% | 10,951 | 46.45% | 4,132 | 17.53% |
| 1996 | 11,015 | 41.65% | 13,081 | 49.46% | 2,352 | 8.89% |
| 2000 | 15,423 | 48.57% | 14,899 | 46.92% | 1,433 | 4.51% |
| 2004 | 22,628 | 50.80% | 21,421 | 48.09% | 492 | 1.10% |
| 2008 | 25,193 | 42.97% | 32,669 | 55.72% | 768 | 1.31% |
| 2012 | 24,387 | 45.10% | 27,236 | 50.36% | 2,455 | 4.54% |
| 2016 | 25,905 | 41.99% | 27,707 | 44.91% | 8,078 | 13.09% |
| 2020 | 34,174 | 44.64% | 40,588 | 53.01% | 1,800 | 2.35% |
| 2024 | 36,605 | 46.02% | 41,205 | 51.80% | 1,730 | 2.18% |

== Education ==
School districts include:

- Albuquerque Public Schools
- Bernalillo Public Schools
- Cuba Independent Schools
- Jemez Valley Public Schools
- Los Alamos Public Schools
- Rio Rancho Public Schools

Bureau of Indian Education (BIE) schools include:

- Jemez Day School
- San Felipe Pueblo Elementary School
- T'siya (Zia) Day School

== Transportation ==
=== Major highways ===
- I-25 / US 85 (unsigned)
- US 550
- NM 4
- NM 14
- NM 16
- NM 22
- NM 126
- NM 165
- NM 197
- NM 290
- NM 313
- NM 315
- NM 347
- NM 448
- NM 485
- NM 528
- NM 537

=== Public transit ===
- The New Mexico Rail Runner Express, a commuter rail system, has several stations in Sandoval County.
- Rio Metro operates select bus lines and paratransit in the county.

== See also ==
- National Register of Historic Places listings in Sandoval County, New Mexico
