= San Pedro Parks Wilderness =

Protected area of New Mexico, US

Coordinates: 36°05′38″N 106°48′48″W

The San Pedro Parks Wilderness is located in southern Rio Arriba County in northern New Mexico and part of the Santa Fe National Forest. It is 41,132 acres (16,646 ha) (64 sq miles) in size. Elevations range from 8,300 feet (2,500 m) in the southwestern corner to 10,592 feet (3,228 m) at San Pedro Peaks near the center of the Wilderness. The Wilderness's average elevation is over 10,000 ft. Conifer forests, interspaced with grassy meadows, called "parks", characterize the wilderness. San Pedro Parks Wilderness is primarily visited for hiking, camping, hunting, and fishing. The Continental Divide Trail passes through the Wilderness.

== History ==
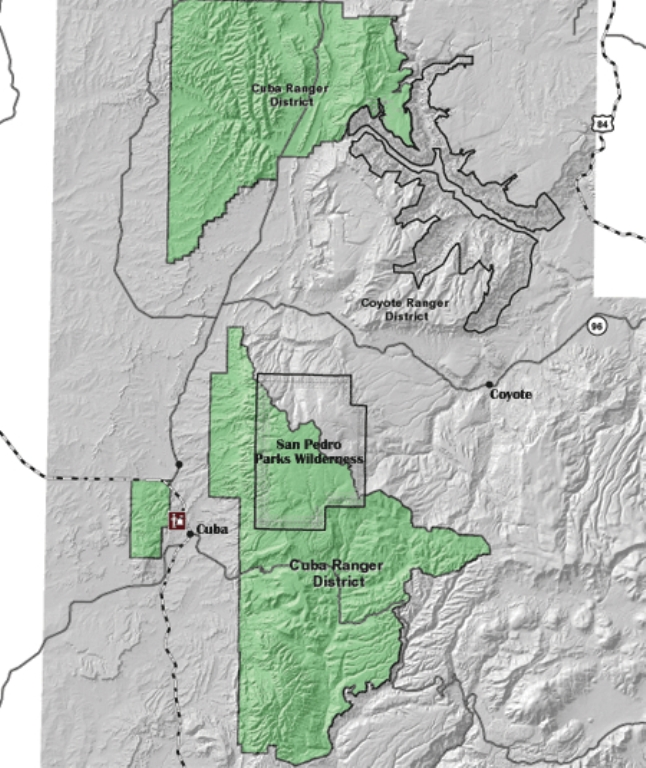
A map of the Cuba Ranger District of the Santa Fe National Forest showing the location of San Pedro Parks Wilderness

In 1931, San Pedro Parks was designated a "Primitive Area" by the U.S. Forest Service. In 1965 it was accorded Wilderness status and protection. U.S. Wilderness Areas do not allow motorized or mechanized vehicles, including bicycles. Camping and fishing are allowed with proper permits, but no roads, buildings, logging, or mining are permitted. Wilderness areas within National Forests and Bureau of Land Management areas allow hunting in season

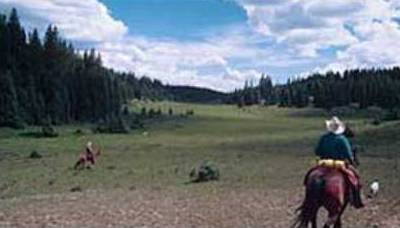
Horseback riders in the San Pedro Parks Wilderness

== Topography, flora, and fauna ==
San Pedro Parks Wilderness is located in the Nacimiento Mountains, the western finger of the southernmost Rocky Mountains. The nearest town is Cuba, New Mexico. The wilderness is approximately 10 miles (16 km) by 7 miles (11 km) in size. Some of the hiking and horseback trails leading into the wilderness are steep but the heart of San Pedro Parks is a plateau, about five miles by six miles, at an elevation of 10,000 feet (3,100 m). Vegetation on the plateau consists of grassy meadows, called "parks", interspaced with forests of Engelmann spruce, other conifers, and Quaking Aspen. The plateau is laced with several small streams which support populations of Rio Grande cutthroat trout. San Pedro Peaks rises gently among the meadows to an elevation of 10,592 feet (3,228 m) feet. Wildflowers of many species abound. The meadows consist primarily of bluegrass, oat grass, sedge, rush, and Rocky Mountain iris.

San Pedro Parks receives about 35 inches (89 cm) of precipitation annually, making it one of the wettest areas of New Mexico. Snowfall is heavy in winter and snow cover can persist until early June. Many of the meadows are boggy from the heavy precipitation. San Gregorio reservoir is an artificial lake about one-half mile long and one-half mile wide at an elevation of 9,400 feet (2,900 m) on the southern edge of the wilderness.

Animals found in San Pedro Parks are typical of the southern Rocky Mountains: mule deer, black bear. wild turkey, and, especially, elk. A large herd of elk summers in the wilderness. In addition, as of 2004 730 head of cattle are permitted to graze inside San Pedro Parks.

== Climate ==
Part of the park has a humid continental climate of the warm-summer type (Köppen: Dfb) and in higher areas a continental subarctic climate (Dfc) with short summers (using the 0 °C isoterm).

== Recreation ==
About 100 miles of trails crisscross San Pedro Parks. The most popular is Vacas Trail, 7.5 miles (12 km) long. The trailhead is on Forest Road 70 and the trail leads north past San Gregorio Lake and continues to San Pedro Park, the largest meadow in the wilderness. Vacas trail intersects many other trails. About 8 miles (13 km) of the Continental Divide Trail passes through the northeastern part of the wilderness. Fishing for stocked rainbow and native Rio Grande cutthroat trout is popular in the San Gregorio Lake and several small streams. Cross country skiing and snowshoeing are popular sports during the winter. In the fall, hunters visit the wilderness, seeking elk, deer, bear, and grouse.

== Vacas Trail/San Gregorio Trailhead ==
Of all the trails in San Pedro Parks the Vacas trail is the most popular. Starting at the San Gregorio Trailhead, the Vacas trail is 10.69 miles to San Pedro Park, which is the largest "park" in the Santa Fe National Forest wilderness. The elevation at the San Gregorio Trailhead is approximately 9,000 ft, with the climb up to San Pedro Park being gradual. Along this trail there are several parks that appear as breaks from the primarily spruce vegetation.
