= Ponderosa, New Mexico =

- CDP
- Location of Ponderosa, New Mexico

- Location in the United States
- Coordinates: 35°40′6″N 106°39′52″W
- Country: United States
- State: New Mexico
- County: Sandoval

Area
  - Total: 9.13 sq mi (23.64 km^{2})
  - Land: 9.13 sq mi (23.64 km^{2})
  - Water: 0 sq mi (0.00 km^{2})
- Elevation: 6,010 ft (1,832 m)

Population (2020)
  - Total: 379
  - Density: 41.5/sq mi (16.03/km^{2})
- Time zone: UTC-7 (Mountain (MST))
  - Summer (DST): UTC-6 (MDT)
- ZIP code: 87044
- Area code: 505
- FIPS code: 35-58980
- GNIS feature ID: 2409087

Ponderosa is a census-designated place (CDP) in Sandoval County, New Mexico, United States. As of the 2020 census, Ponderosa had a population of 379. It is part of the Albuquerque Metropolitan Statistical Area.

== Geography ==
Ponderosa is located at 35°40′6″N 106°39′52″W (35.668305, -106.664462).

According to the United States Census Bureau, the CDP has a total area of 7.3 square miles (19 km^{2}), all land.

== Demographics ==
Historical population
Census	Pop.	Note	%±
2020	379		—
U.S. Decennial Census

As of the census of 2015, there are 383 people, 171 households, and 96 families. The population density is 42.4 people per square mile (16.4/km^{2}). There are 198 housing units. The racial makeup of the 2000 CDP was 29.68% White, 0.32% African American, 4.52% Native American, 0.32% Asian, 0.32% Pacific Islander, 59.68% from other races, and 5.16% from two or more races. Hispanic or Latino of any race were 64.52% of the population. The 2015 Diversity Index is 71.

In 2000, there were 112 households, out of which 42.0% had children under the age of 18 living with them, 70.5% were married couples living together, 5.4% had a female householder with no husband present, and 21.4% were non-families. 17.9% of all households were made up of individuals, and 5.4% had someone living alone who was 65 years of age or older. The average household size was 2.77 and the average family size was 3.16.

In the CDP, the population was spread out, with 28.1% under the age of 18, 7.1% from 18 to 24, 21.0% from 25 to 44, 35.2% from 45 to 64, and 8.7% who were 65 years of age or older. The median age was 41 years. For every 100 females, there were 109.5 males. For every 100 females age 18 and over, there were 100.9 males.

In 2015 the median income for a household is $60,156. In the 2000 CDP the median income for a family was $45,417. Males had a median income of $39,300 versus $28,182 for females. The per capita income for the CDP is $33,781. In 2000, about 14.5% of families and 19.8% of the population were below the poverty line, including 32.0% of those under age 18 and none of those age 65 or over.

== Education ==
Most of Ponderosa is within the Jemez Valley Public Schools school district. A portion extends into Bernalillo Public Schools.

== Local attractions ==
- Ponderosa Valley Vineyards & Winery
