= Jemez River =

River in New Mexico, United States

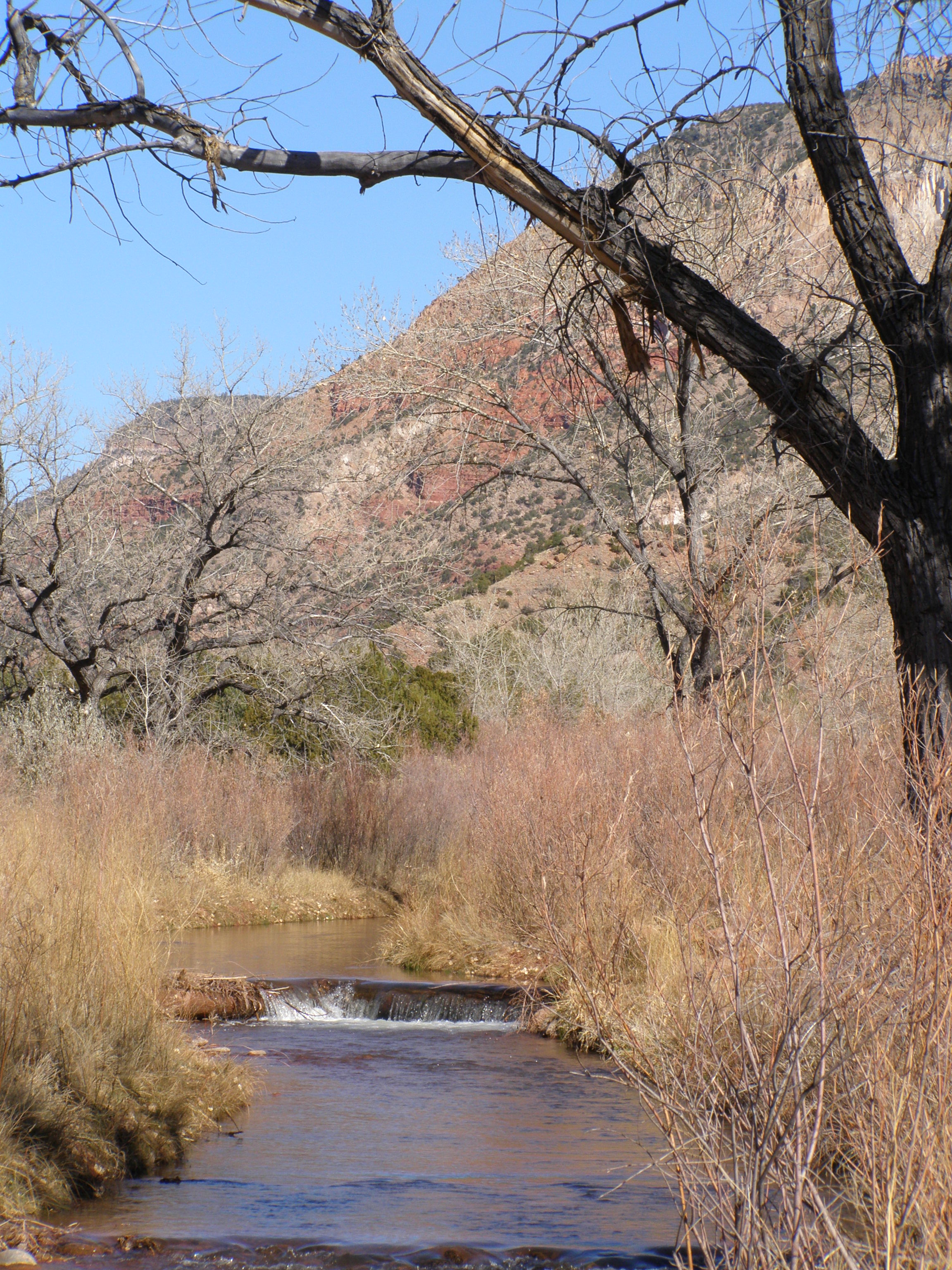
- Jemez River, downstream from Jemez Pueblo, November 2008

- Location of the mouth of the Jemez River in New Mexico

Location
- Country: United States
- State: New Mexico
- County: Sandoval

Physical characteristics
- Source: Confluence of San Antonio Creek and East Fork Jemez River
  - location: Jemez Mountains
  - coordinates: 35°51′57″N 106°38′21″W
- Mouth: Rio Grande
  - coordinates: 35°22′9″N 106°30′52″W
- Length: 80 mi (130 km)
- Basin size: 1,038 sq mi (2,690 km^{2})
- Discharge
  - location: USGS gage 08329000, 2 miles above mouth
  - average: 59.5 cu ft/s (1.68 m^{3}/s)
  - minimum: 0 cu ft/s (0 m^{3}/s)
  - maximum: 3,640 cu ft/s (103 m^{3}/s)

National Wild and Scenic River
- Official name: Jemez (East Fork)
- Type: Wild, Scenic, Recreational
- Designated: June 6, 1990

The Jemez River (Jemez: Hę P'â, Eastern Keres: Pónye Chéna) is a tributary of the Rio Grande in eastern Sandoval County, New Mexico, United States.

== Description ==
The river is formed by the confluence of the East Fork Jemez River and San Antonio Creek, which drain a number of tributaries in the area of the Jemez Mountains and Santa Fe National Forest. The Jemez River is about 50 miles (80 km) long, or about 80 miles (130 km) long if its longest headwater tributary, San Antonio Creek, is included. The East Fork Jemez River is about 22 miles (35 km) long. Both San Antonio Creek and the East Fork Jemez River flow through intricate meanders along their courses. The East Fork Jemez is a National Wild and Scenic River.

The Jemez River flows generally south to join the Rio Grande near Bernalillo, north of Albuquerque.

== Course ==
The main tributaries streams that join to form the Jemez River are San Antonio Creek and the East Fork Jemez River. Both originate on the west side of the Sierra de los Valles near the northwest corner of Los Alamos County. San Antonio Creek flows west in a northward curve, through Valle Toledo and Valle San Antonio. The East Fork Jemez River flows west in a southward curve, through Valle Grande. These valleys are all part of the Valles Caldera. The two tributary streams join near Battleship Rock in Cañon de San Diego, forming the Jemez River's main stem.

The Jemez River flows south through the Cañon de San Diego, between the Jemez Mountains and the Nacimiento Mountains to Jemez Springs, and continues south through the canyon to its confluence with the Rio Guadalupe, near Cañones and Cañon. From there the Jemez River continues south, passing through the Jemez Indian Reservation, where some of its water is diverted into irrigation canals. Vallecito Creek joins the Jemez River near Jemez Pueblo. A few miles to the south the Jemez River enters the Zia Indian Reservation and is joined by the Rio Salado, about four miles upstream from Zia Pueblo. The river's course bends slightly to the southeast and it enters the Santa Ana Indian Reservation, passing by the Santa Ana Pueblo, located at the upper end of the Jemez Canyon Reservoir. The reservoir is created by the Jemez Canyon Dam and is entirely within the Santa Ana Reservation. Below the dam the Jemez River flows about three miles to its confluence with the Rio Grande, a few miles north of Bernalillo.

== See also ==
- List of rivers of New Mexico
- List of tributaries of the Rio Grande
