= New Mexico State Road 44 =

State highway in New Mexico, United States

State Road 44
- 1988 routing of NM 44 highlighted in red

Route information
- Maintained by NMDOT
- Existed: 1930–2000

Major junctions
- South end: NM 10 / NM 14 in Cedar Crest (1940-1988), I-25 in Bernalillo (1988-2000)
- North end: US 550 in Aztec (1940-1988), US 64 in Bloomfield (1988-2000)

Location
- Country: United States
- State: New Mexico
- Counties: Rio Arriba, Sandoval, San Juan

Highway system
- New Mexico State Highway System; Interstate; US; State; Scenic
← NM 43	→ NM 45

State Road 44 (NM 44) was a state highway in the US state of New Mexico. NM 44's southern terminus was in Cedar Crest from 1940-1988 and in Bernalillo from 1988–2000, and the northern terminus was in Aztec from 1940-1988 and in Bloomfield from 1988–2000. The route became an extension of U.S. Route 550 (US 550) in 2000 after the road was changed from a 2-lane to 4-lane-divided highway from Bloomfield to Bernalillo.

== History ==
In the 1930s, the section between Cuba and Farmington was known as NM 55. By 1940 NM 44 was moved to the road NM 55 followed, and the NM 55 designation was removed. The section east of Interstate 25 (US 85) was renumbered in 1988 as NM 165 and as an extension of NM 536, and the segment between Bloomfield and Aztec became NM 544 because NM 44 had a short concurrency with US 64. In the late 80s and early 90s the accident rates began to increase which prompted New Mexico Department of Transportation to upgrade the entire road from Aztec to Bernalillo from 2-lane to a 4-lane-divided over a several-year period at a cost of $312 million, and once construction was complete NM 44 and NM 544 became an extension of US 550 in 2000.

== Major intersections ==
Based on 1988-2000 routing.

County	Location	mi	km	Destinations	Notes
Sandoval	Bernalillo	0.000	0.000	I-25 – Albuquerque, Santa Fe	Southern terminus
Sandoval	Bernalillo	2.440	3.927	NM 528 south – Rio Rancho	Northern terminus of NM 528
Sandoval		23.225	37.377	NM 4 north – San Ysidro	Southern terminus of NM 4
Sandoval		63.381	102.002	NM 197 south – Torreon	Northern terminus of NM 197
Sandoval	Cuba	64.346	103.555	NM 126 east – Santa Fe National Forest	Western terminus of NM 126
Sandoval		68.025	109.476	NM 96 north – La Jara	Southern terminus of NM 96
Sandoval		85.485	137.575	NM 537 north	Southern terminus of NM 537
Rio Arriba	No major junctions				
San Juan		123.470	198.706	NM 57 south	Northern terminus of NM 57
San Juan	Bloomfield	151.746	244.212	US 64 – Farmington, Taos	Northern terminus
1.000 mi = 1.609 km; 1.000 km = 0.621 mi
