= Engineer Mountain =

Mountain in Colorado, United States

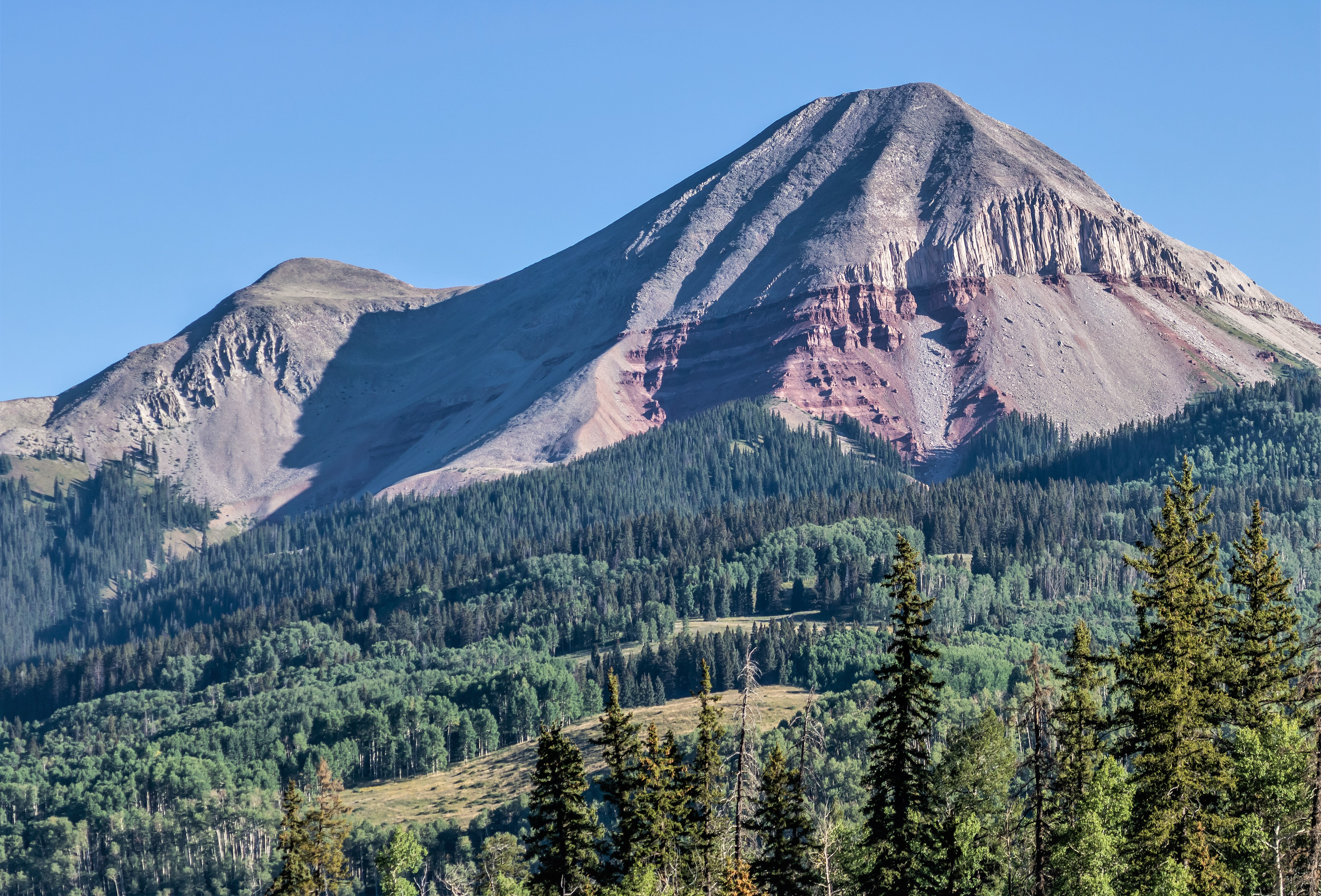
- Southeast aspect

Highest point
- Elevation: 12,968 ft (3,953 m)
- Prominence: 1,408 ft (429 m)
- Parent peak: Rolling Mountain (13,693 ft)
- Isolation: 4.74 mi (7.63 km)
- Coordinates: 37°41′57″N 107°48′24″W

Geography
- Location within Colorado Location within the United States
- Country: United States
- State: Colorado
- County: San Juan
- Protected area: San Juan National Forest
- Parent range: Rocky Mountains; San Juan Mountains
- Topo map: USGS Engineer Mountain

Geology
- Rock age: Tertiary
- Rock type(s): Quartz trachyte, Cutler Formation

Climbing
- Easiest route: class 3 scramble Northeast Ridge

Engineer Mountain is a 12,968-foot-elevation (3,953-meter) mountain summit located in San Juan County, Colorado, United States. It is part of the San Juan Mountains range which is a subset of the Rocky Mountains, and is west of the Continental Divide. Engineer Mountain is a prominent landmark set 1.5 mile immediately west of Coal Bank Pass, and is visible from multiple viewpoints along Highway 550, making it one of the most photographed mountains in the San Juans. It is situated 11 miles southwest of the community of Silverton, on land managed by San Juan National Forest. Topographic relief is significant as the southwest aspect rises 3,800 feet (1,200 meters) above Cascade Creek in approximately two miles. Neighbors include Snowdon Peak seven miles to the east, and Twilight Peak, five miles to the southeast.

== Climate ==
According to the Köppen climate classification system, Engineer Mountain is located in an alpine subarctic climate zone with long, cold, snowy winters, and cool to warm summers. Due to its altitude, it receives precipitation all year, as snow in winter, and as thunderstorms in summer, with a dry period in late spring. Precipitation runoff from the mountain drains into tributaries of the Animas River.

== Gallery ==
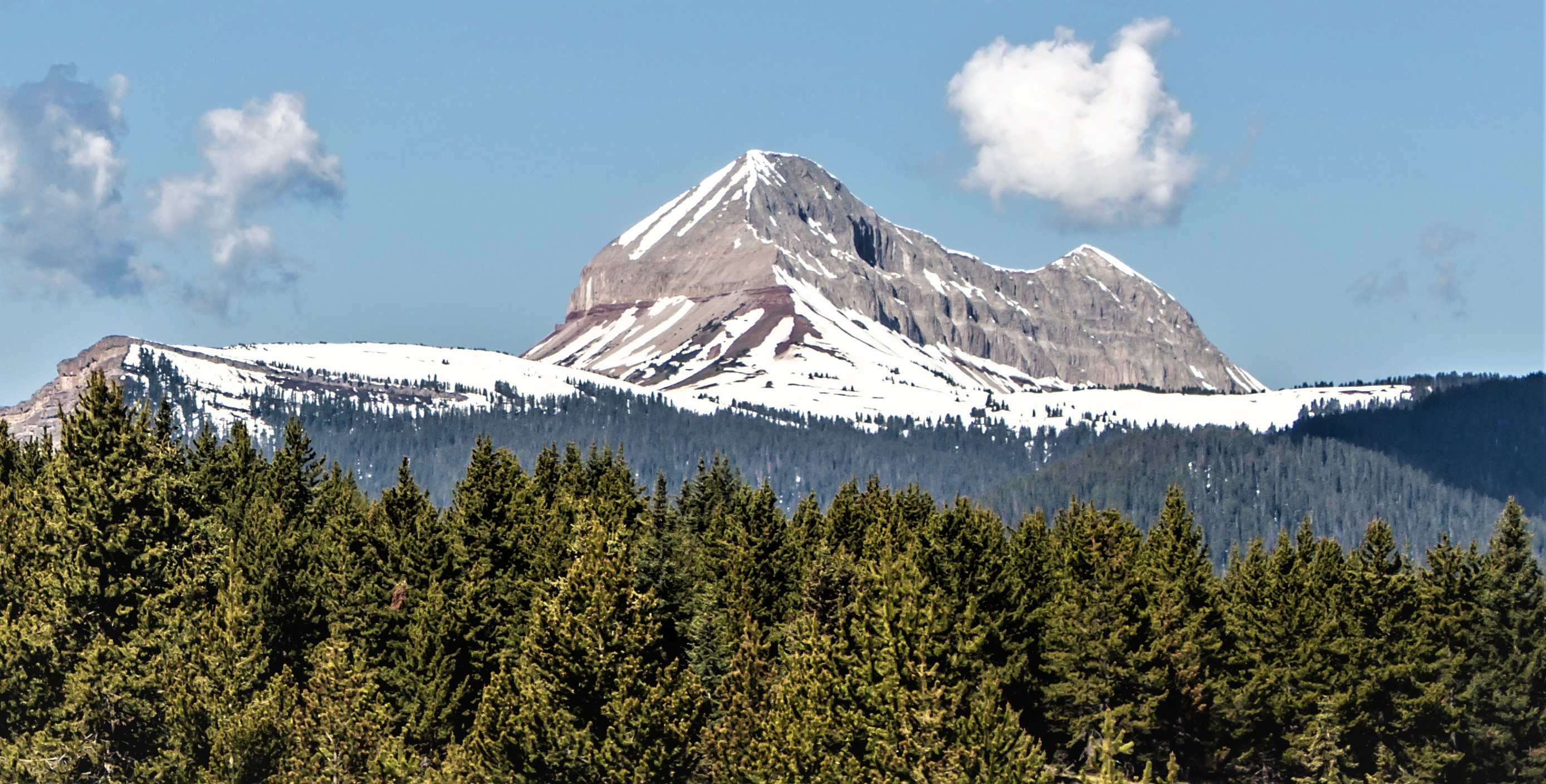
Northeast aspect

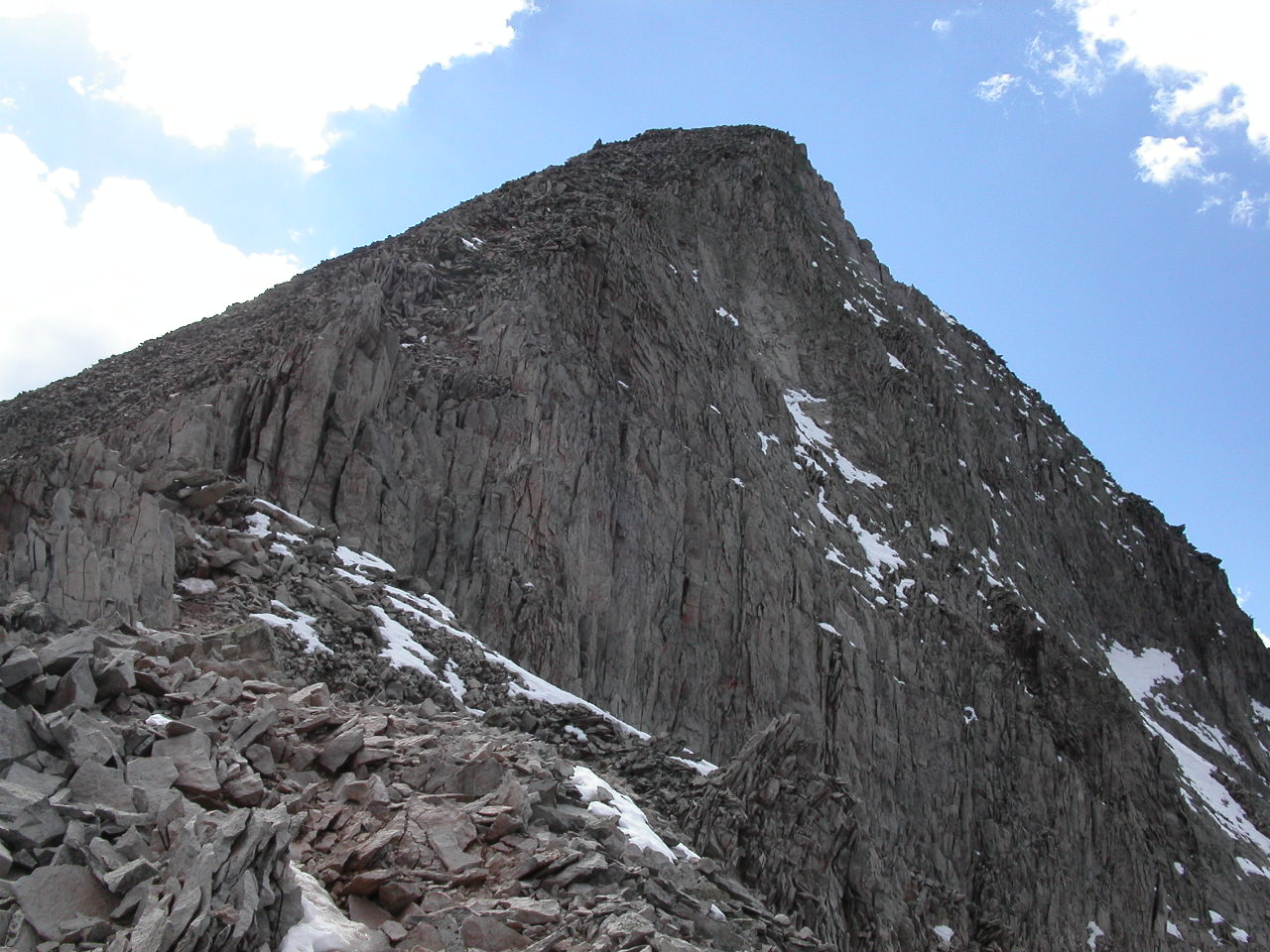
View of the summit from Northeast Ridge

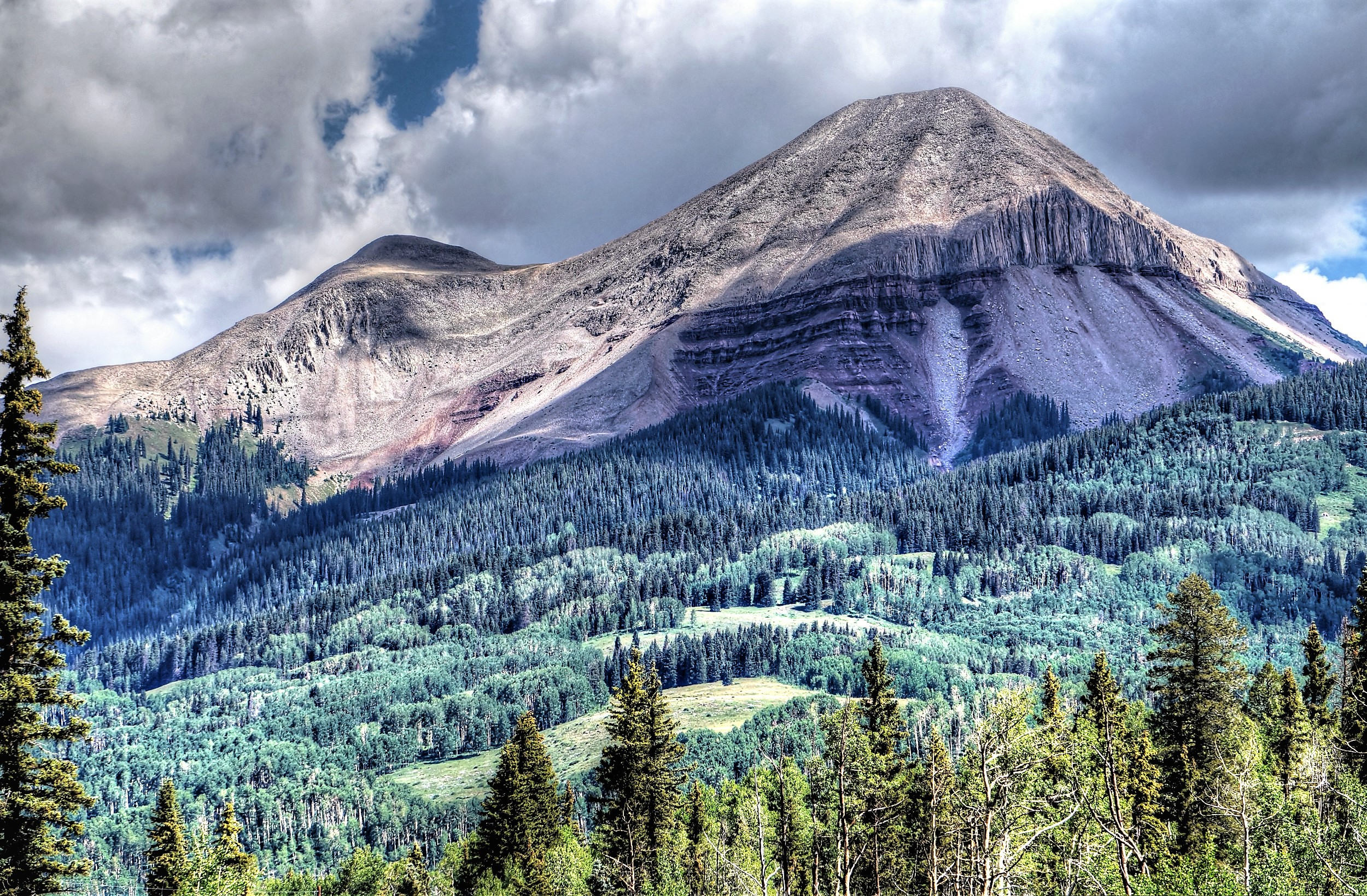
Southeast aspect

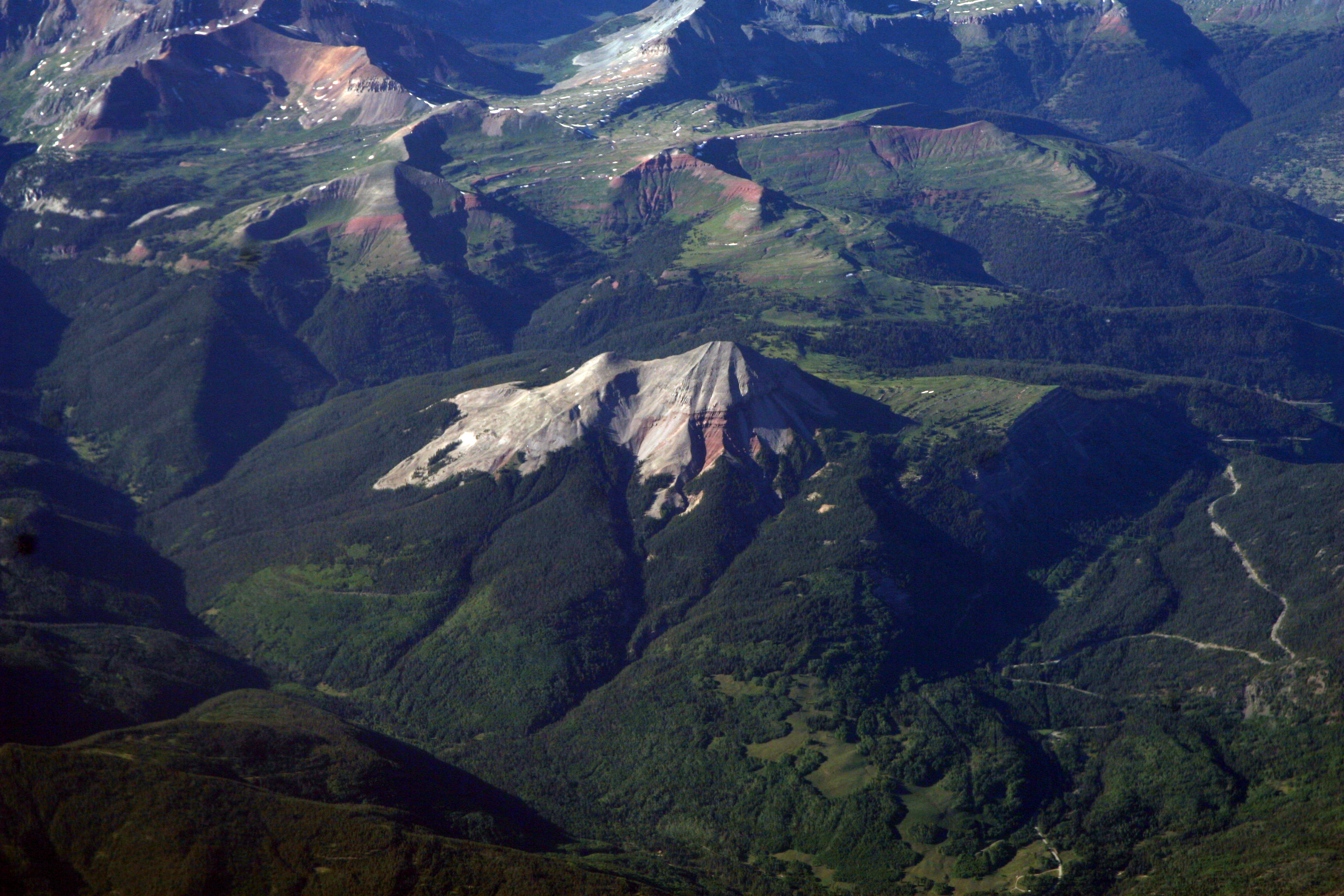
Aerial view, with Coal Bank Pass to right side

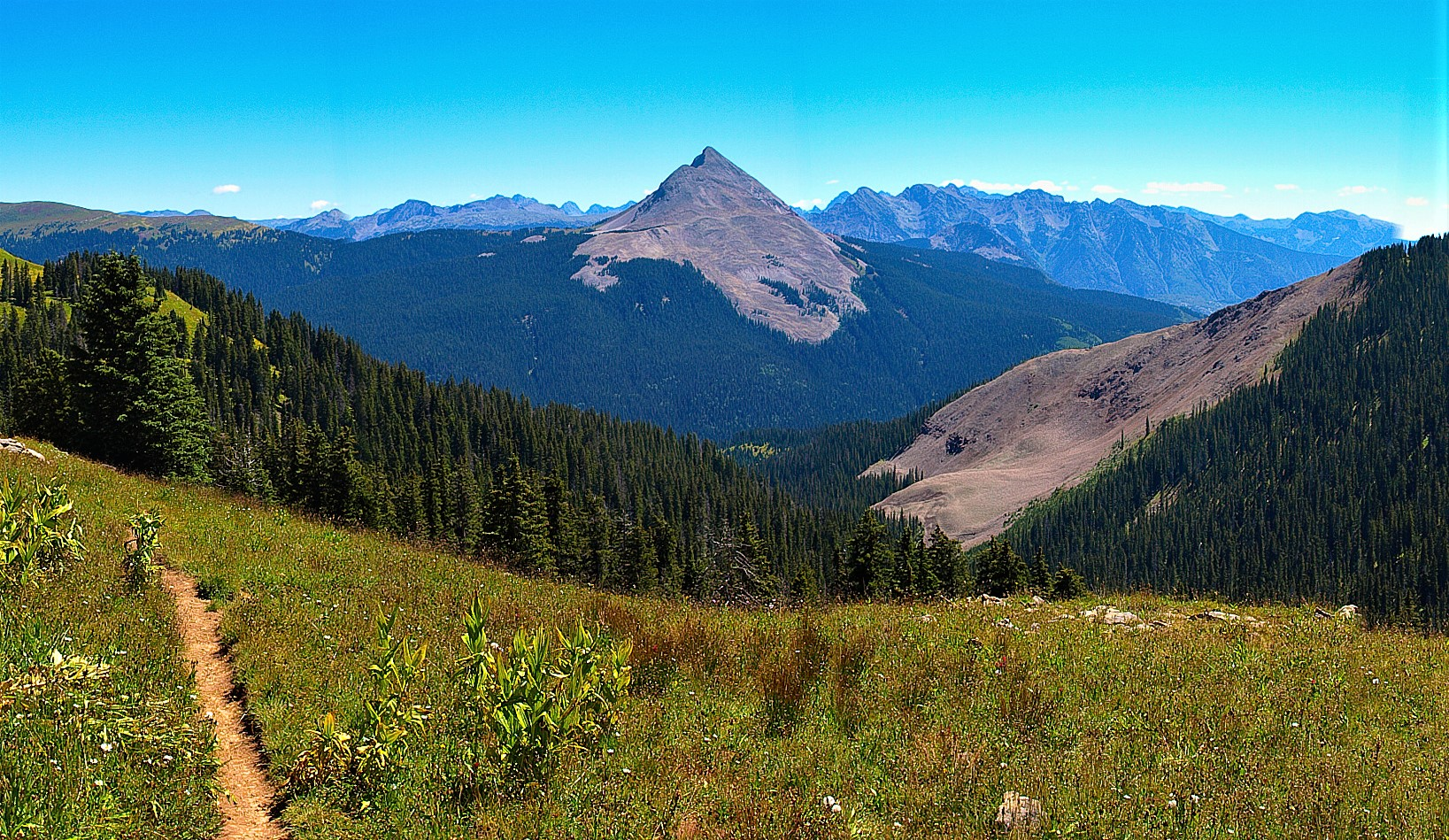
West aspect

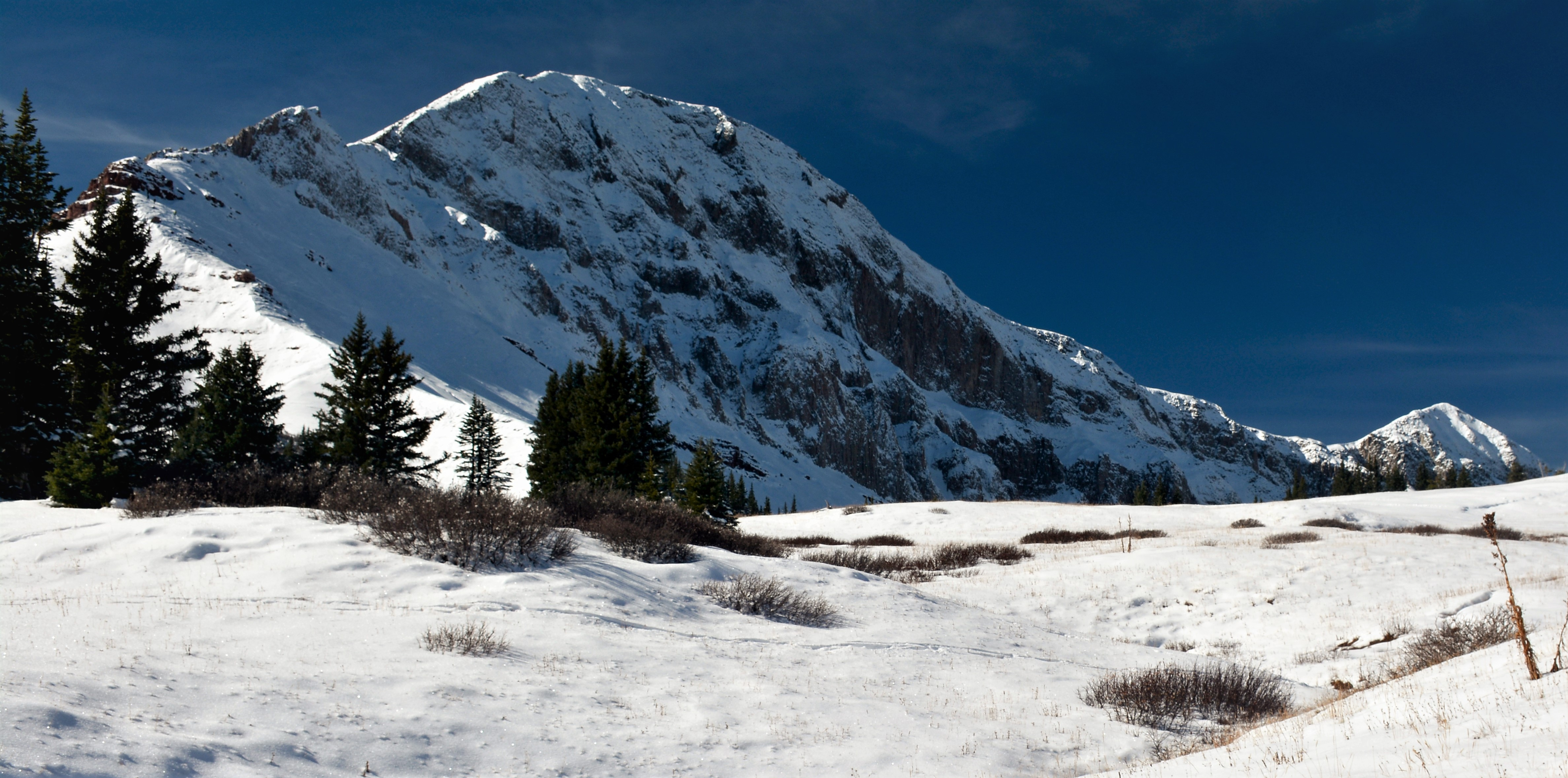
North aspect

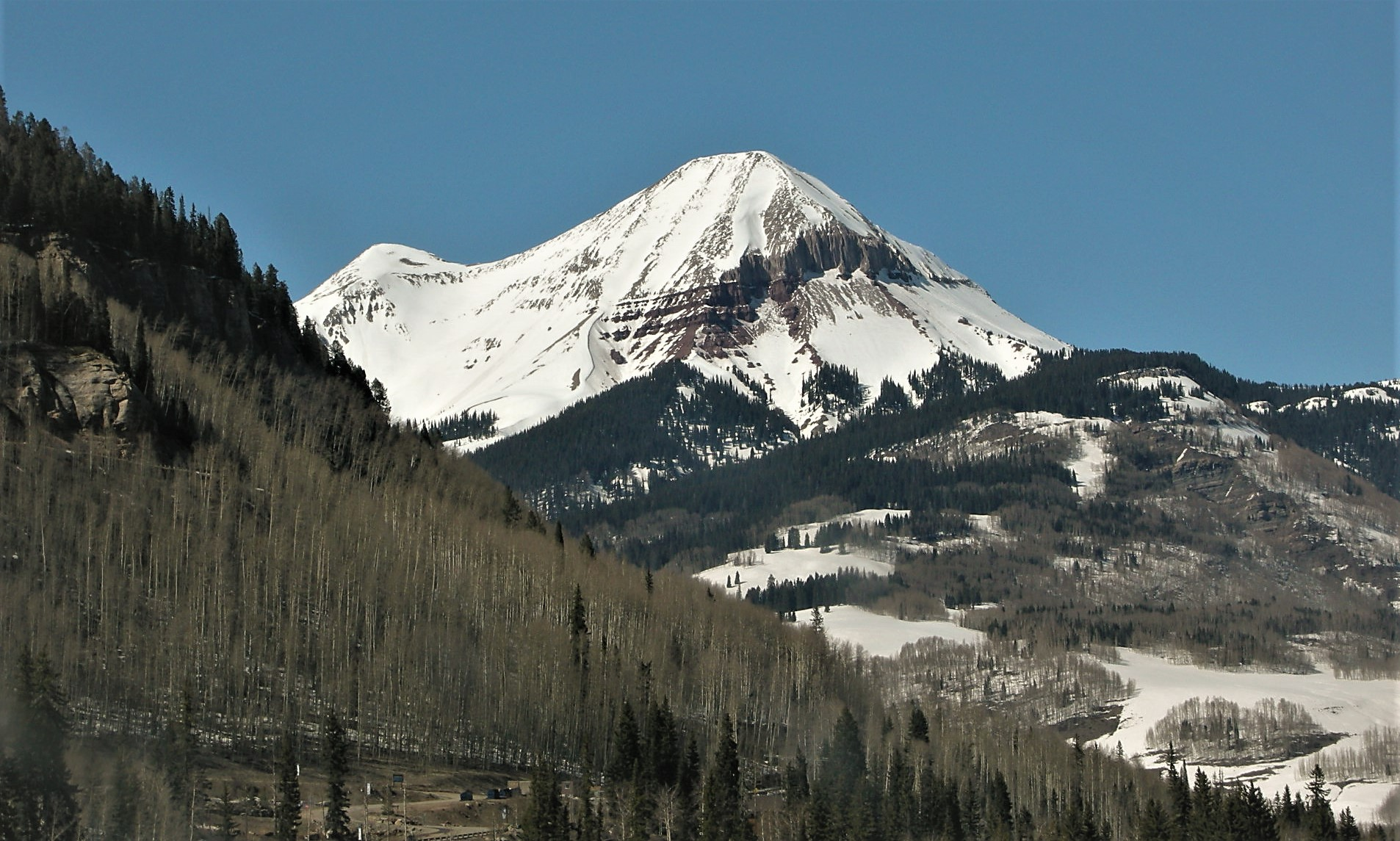

== See also ==
- Mountains of San Juan County, Colorado
