= U.S. Route 550 =

Highway in the United States

U.S. Route 550
- Million Dollar Highway
- US 550 highlighted in red

Route information
- Auxiliary route of US 50
- Length: 305.104 mi (491.017 km)
- Existed: 1926–present

Major junctions
- South end: I-25 / US 85 / NM 165 in Bernalillo, NM
- US 64 in Bloomfield, NM; US 160 in Durango, CO
- North end: US 50 at Montrose, CO

Location
- Country: United States
- States: New Mexico, Colorado
- Counties: NM: Sandoval, Rio Arriba, San Juan; CO: La Plata, San Juan, Ouray, Montrose

Highway system
- United States Numbered Highway System; List; Special; Divided
← NM 549	NM	→ NM 551
← US 491	CO	→ US 650

U.S. Route 550 (US 550) is a spur of U.S. Highway 50 that runs from Bernalillo, New Mexico to Montrose, Colorado in the western United States. The section from Silverton to Ouray is frequently called the Million Dollar Highway. It is one of the roads on the Trails of the Ancients Byway, one of the designated New Mexico Scenic Byways.

== Route description ==
=== New Mexico ===
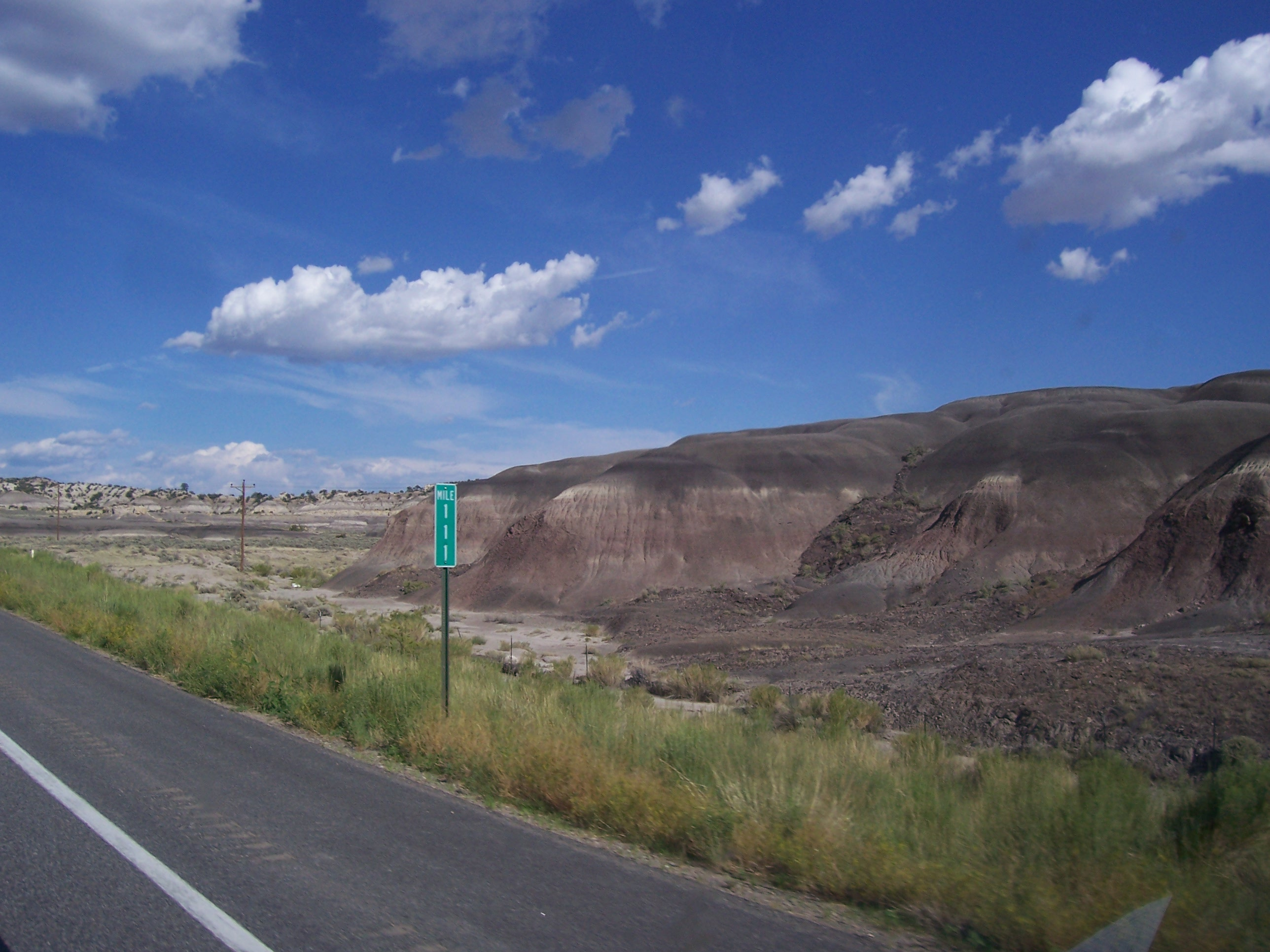
View of Tertiary sediments of the San Juan Basin Badlands at southbound Mile Marker 111 in New Mexico (36.2558°N 107.6229°W).

US 550 begins at a junction with Interstate 25/US 85 and NM 165 in the town of Bernalillo, just north of Albuquerque in Sandoval County. It soon junctions NM 313 at Camino del Pueblo. US 550 then crosses the Rio Grande and shortly after serves as the northern terminus of NM 528 at a continuous flow intersection, the first one to open in the state. US 550 then enters Rio Rancho and follows along the southern edge of the Santa Ana Pueblo before serving as the northern terminus of NM 347. It soon leaves Rio Rancho, and the speed limit raises to 70 mph, continuing as a divided highway through the Santa Ana Pueblo.

US 550 enters the Zia Pueblo shortly before mile marker 14, with a road to enter the Pueblo about 4.5 miles later. It soon turns northbound leaving the Zia Pueblo and enters the Village of San Ysidro. It then turns due west to navigate around the west of the Sierra Nacimiento mountain range, passing through scenic red rock formations and mountain passes. US 550 soon re-enters the Zia Pueblo before it enters the Jemez Pueblo at an intersection with the old route of NM 279. US 550 then continues north through rural areas before entering Cuba. In Cuba, US 550 serves as the terminus for three state highways, NM 96, NM 126, and NM 197. US 550 then turns west, entering a small portion of the Santa Fe National Forest before reaching the continental divide at the border of the Jicarilla Apache Nation Reservation.

US 550 then leaves the Jicarilla Apache Nation Reservation and soon enters Rio Arriba County, before shortly leaving it about 8.5 miles later, entering San Juan County. The road then turns northwest, cutting through areas of the Navajo Nation. US 550 soon enters Bloomfield, signed as Bloomfield Boulevard, and soon junctions US 64, joining it eastbound for a very short 0.25 mile concurrency before leaving north at First Street. Between Bloomfield and Aztec, US 550 replaced a former routing of NM 544, which was decommissioned in 2000 when US 550 was extended south. Entering Aztec as Main Street, US 550 passes through downtown before meeting NM 516 at Aztec Boulevard, which it terminates. US 550 then turns northeast, continuing along the Animas River towards Colorado.

For its entirety in New Mexico, US 550 is a four-lane divided highway with speed limits of 70 mph, excluding sections through towns. US 550 replaced NM 44 between Bloomfield and Bernalillo after the road was widened to four lanes, a near $300 million project completed in 2001 as the result of high accident rates. Controversy still surrounds the highway, as narrow medians due to cost cutting with high speed limits result in a still high fatal crash rate, with 15 deaths occurring in 2015-2016, second only to Interstate 40 during that time.

=== Colorado ===
Most of U.S. 550 in Colorado is two-lane mountainous highway. It is one of only two north–south U.S. Highways in Colorado which runs west of the Continental Divide. (The other route is US 491.) The route travels north through the San Juan Mountains.

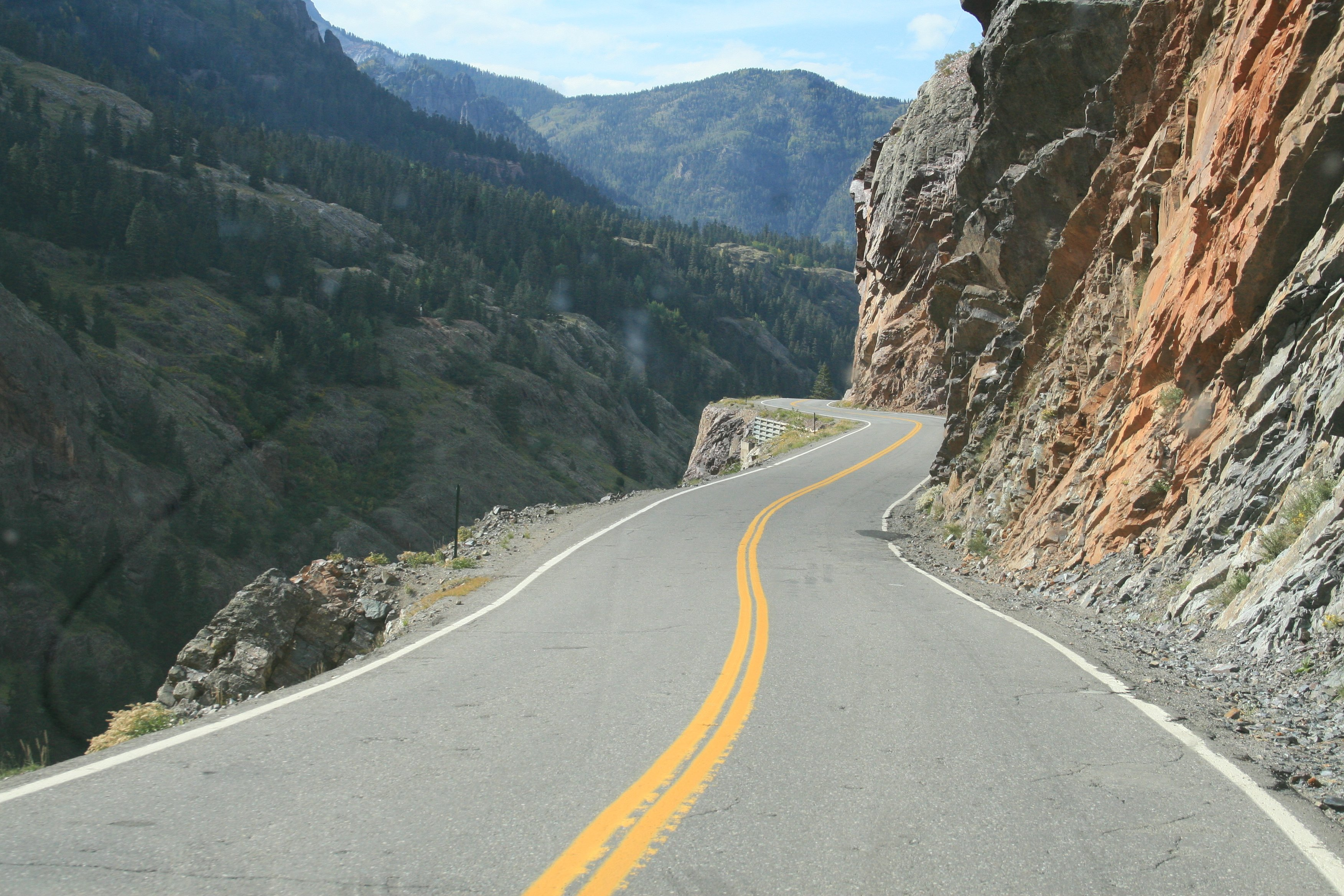
U.S. Route 550 at the Uncompahgre Gorge

The Million Dollar Highway stretches for about 25 miles (40 km) in western Colorado and follows the route of U.S. 550 between Silverton and Ouray, Colorado. It is part of the San Juan Skyway Scenic Byway. Between Durango and Silverton the Skyway loosely parallels the Durango and Silverton Narrow Gauge Railroad.

Although the entire stretch has been called the Million Dollar Highway, it is actually just the twelve miles (19 km) south of Ouray through the Uncompahgre Gorge to the summit of Red Mountain Pass which gives the highway its name. This stretch through the gorge is challenging and potentially hazardous to drive; it is characterized by steep cliffs, narrow lanes, and a lack of guardrails; the ascent of Red Mountain Pass is marked with a number of hairpin curves used to gain elevation, narrow lanes for traffic—many cut directly into the sides of mountains. During this ascent, the remains of the Idarado Mine are visible. Travel north from Silverton to Ouray allows drivers to hug the inside of curves; travel south from Ouray to Silverton perches drivers on the vertiginous outside edge of the highway. Large RVs travel in both directions, which adds a degree of challenge to people in cars. The road is kept open year-round. Summer temperatures can range from highs between 70–90 °F (21–32 °C) at the ends of the highway to 50–70 °F (10–21 °C) in the mountain passes. The snow season starts in October, and snow will often close the road in winter. Chains may be required to drive.

North of Durango, the highway passes by Trimble Springs, hot springs that have been open for visitors since the late 19th century. The highway runs north along the Animas River, under the Hermosa Cliffs. It enters the San Juan National Forest and goes past Haviland Lake and Electra Lake. Drivers pass by Engineer Mountain and Twilight Peak before crossing Coal Bank Pass. Next is Molas Pass, which offers a panoramic view of Molas Lake, the Animas River Gorge, and Snowdon Peak. Northbound travelers then pass through the town of Silverton, elevation 9,320 feet (2,840 m), surrounded by 13,000-foot (4,000 m) peaks Sultan Mountain, Kendall Mountain, and Storm Peak.

The highway leaves Silverton and proceeds up Mineral Creek Valley before ascending to Red Mountain Pass. The ruins of the Longfellow Mine are visible along the way. The highway then goes through a series of steep grades and hairpin turns before reaching Lookout Point, which offers a view of the town of Ouray.

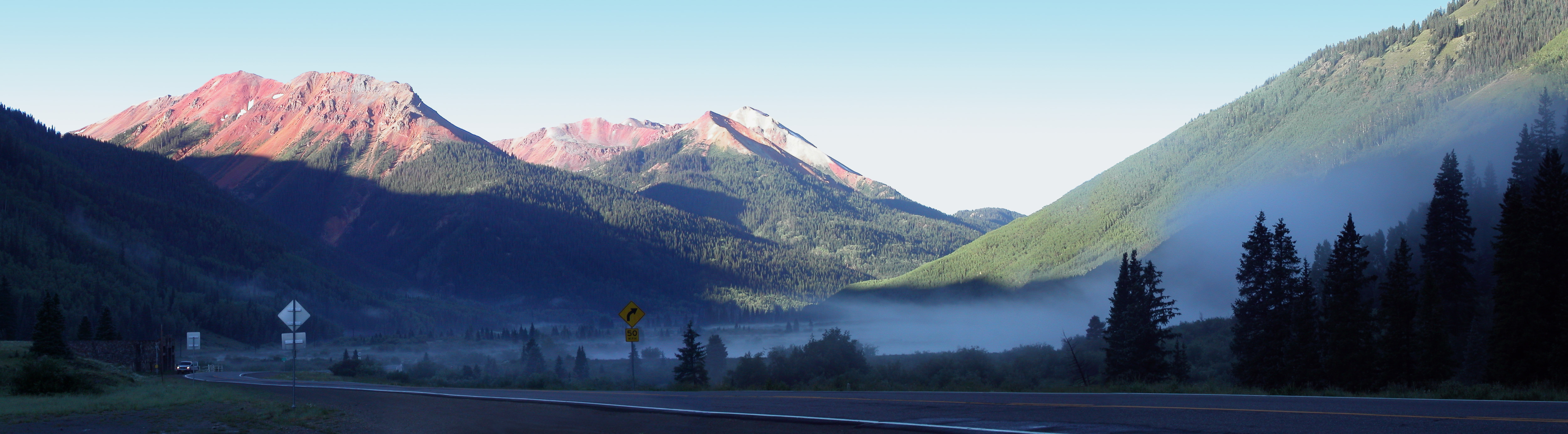
Looking south toward Red Mountain Pass.

This section of the route passes over three mountain passes:

- Coal Bank Pass, elevation 10,640 ft (3,240 m).
- Molas Pass, elevation 10,970 ft (3,340 m).
- Red Mountain Pass, elevation 11,018 ft (3,358 m).

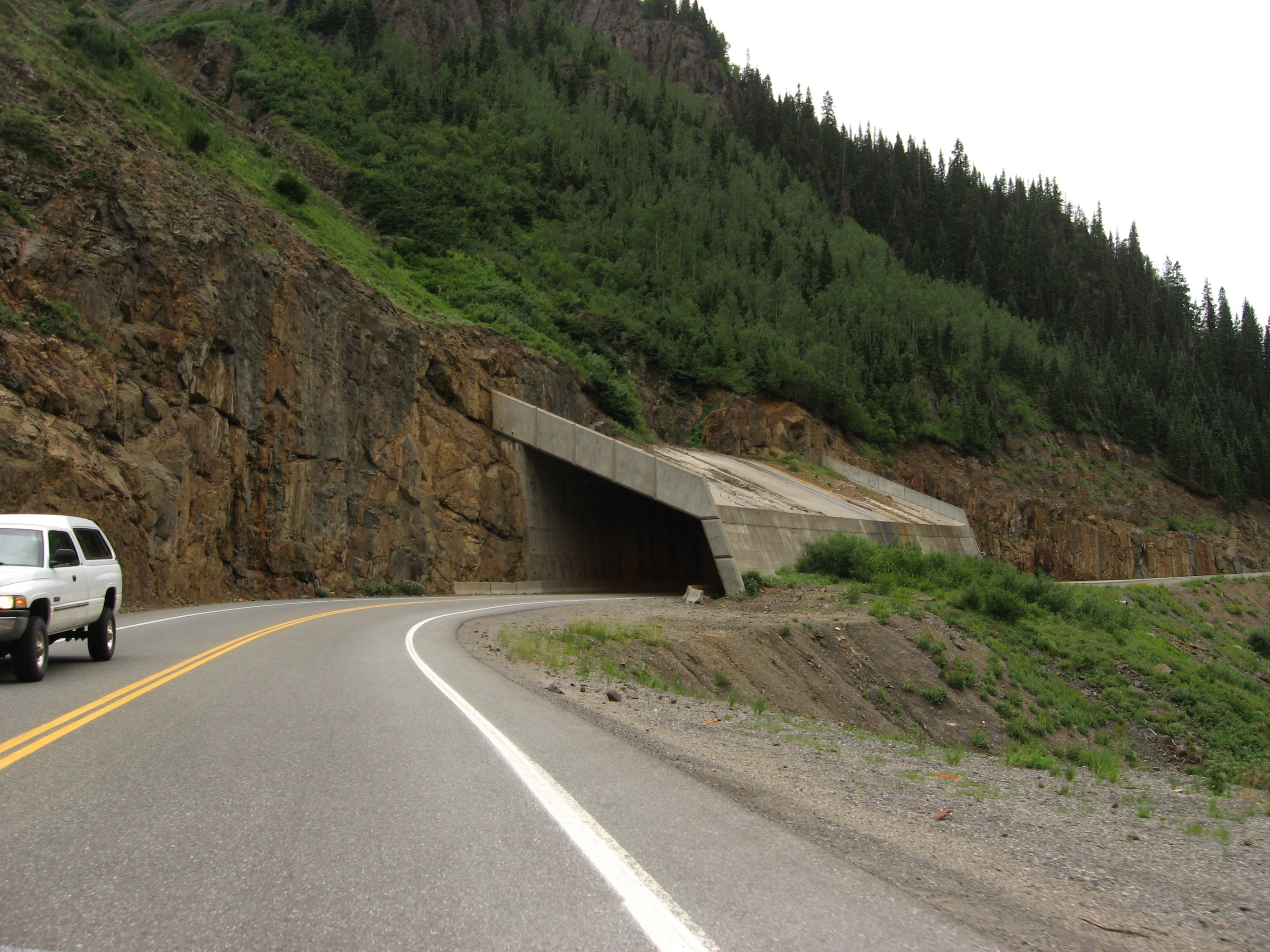
An "overpass" for an active avalanche chute on the Million Dollar Highway, south of Ouray.

The origin of the name Million Dollar Highway is disputed. There are several legends, though, including that it cost a million dollars a mile to build in the 1920s, and that its fill dirt contains a million dollars in gold ore.

There are seventy named avalanche paths that intersect Highway 550 in the 23 mi (37 km) between Ouray and Silverton, Colorado.

U.S. 550 ends at the corner of Townsend Avenue and San Juan Avenue in Montrose, Colorado at the junction of its parent route U.S. Highway 50.

== History ==
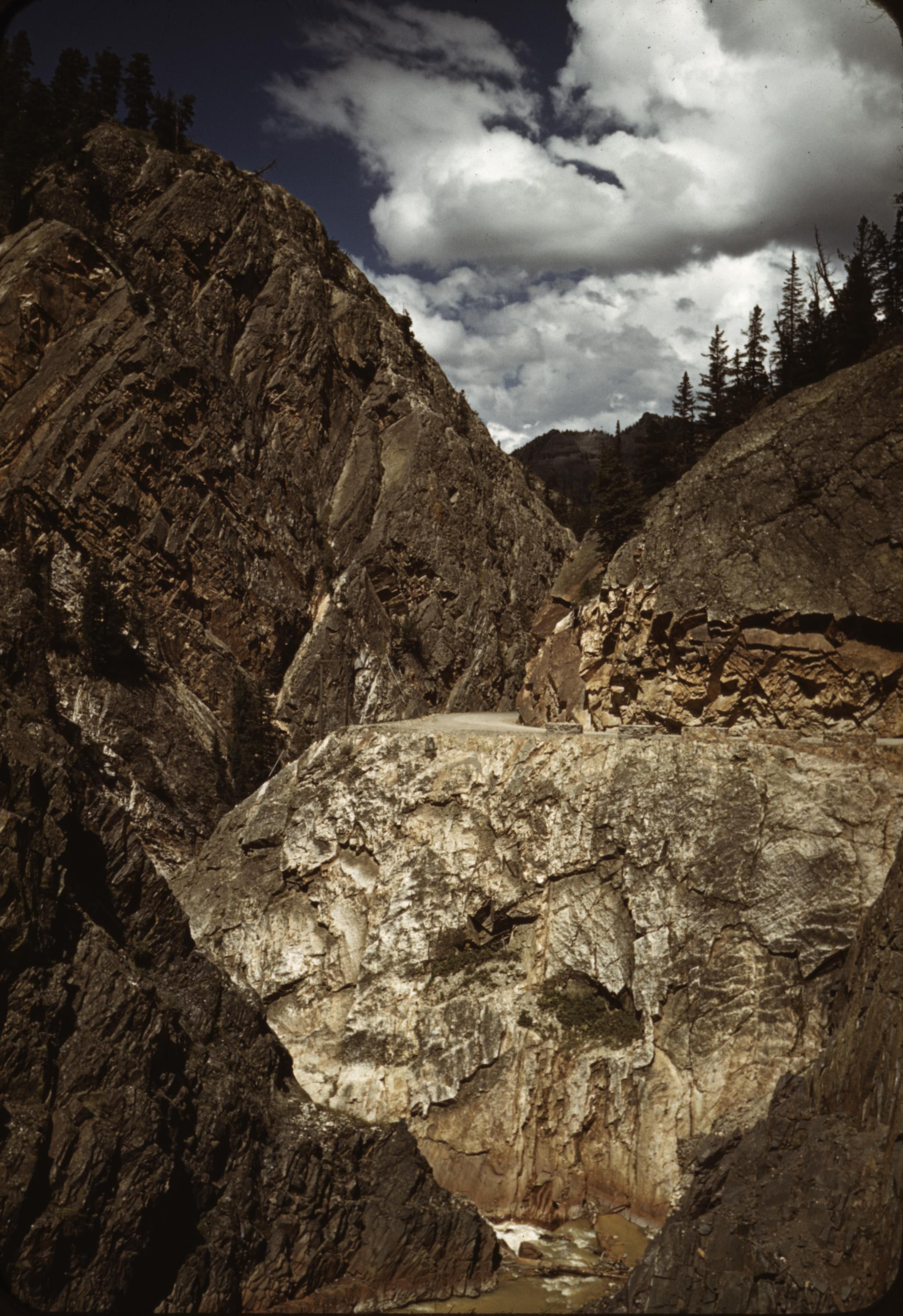
A view of the Million Dollar Highway pass.

The original portion of the Million Dollar Highway was a toll road built by Otto Mears in 1883 to connect Ouray and Ironton. Another toll road was built over Red Mountain Pass from Ironton to Silverton. In the late 1880s Otto Mears turned to building railroads and built the Silverton Railroad north from Silverton over Red Mountain Pass to reach the lucrative mining districts around Red Mountain, terminating at Albany just eight miles (13 km) south of Ouray. The remaining eight miles (13 km) were considered too difficult and steep for a railroad. At one point a cog railroad was proposed, but it never made it beyond the planning stage.

In the early 1920s, the original toll road was rebuilt at considerable cost and became the present day US 550. The Million Dollar Highway was completed in 1924. Today the entire route is part of the San Juan Skyway Scenic Byway.

US 550 was part of the original 1926 federal highway system. The original highway extended 110 miles (180 km) from Montrose, Colorado at U.S. Highway 50 to U.S. Highway 450 (now U.S. Highway 160) at Durango, Colorado. In 1934, Highway 550 was extended through Farmington to Shiprock, New Mexico. In 1989, the western end of US 550 was replaced with US 64 between Farmington and Shiprock. In 2000, US 550 was extended further south from Aztec to Bernalillo to replace the newly widened NM 44 and NM 544, at which time all of US 550 in New Mexico was four lanes.

In 2009 US 50 was re-routed onto the San Juan Avenue bypass to avoid downtown Montrose. As a result, U.S. 550 was extended approximately one mile northwest to intersect with the new U.S. 50 alignment.

On July 17, 2024, the segment of US 550 leading into Durango from the south was realigned onto a four-lane divided highway tying into the Grandview Interchange. This realignment bypasses a former steep, curvy alignment up Farmington Hill and includes a new roundabout.

== Major intersections ==
State	County	Location	mi	km	Destinations	Notes
New Mexico	Sandoval	Bernalillo	0.000	0.000	NM 165 east – Placitas	Continuation east beyond southern terminus
New Mexico	Sandoval	Bernalillo	0.000	0.000	I-25 / US 85 north (CanAm Highway) – Santa Fe, Las Vegas, Raton I-25 / US 85 south (CanAm Highway) – Albuquerque	Southern terminus; I-25 exit 242
New Mexico	Sandoval	Bernalillo			NM 313 north (Camino Del Pueblo) – Santa Ana Pueblo, Algodones, San Felipe Pueblo NM 313 south (Camino Del Pueblo) – Pueblo of Sandia Village, North Valley	
New Mexico	Sandoval	Bernalillo	2.440	3.927	NM 528 south – Rio Rancho	Northern end of NM 528
New Mexico	Sandoval	San Ysidro	23.225	37.377	NM 4 north – San Ysidro	Southern end of NM 4
New Mexico	Sandoval		63.381	102.002	NM 197 south – Torreon	Northern end of NM 197
New Mexico	Sandoval	Cuba	64.346	103.555	NM 126 east – Santa Fe National Forest	Western end of NM 126
New Mexico	Sandoval		68.025	109.476	NM 96 north – La Jara	Southern end of NM 96
New Mexico	Sandoval		85.485	137.575	NM 537 north	Southern end of NM 537
New Mexico	Rio Arriba	No major junctions				
New Mexico	San Juan		123.470	198.706	NM 57 south	Northern end of NM 57
New Mexico	San Juan	Bloomfield	151.746	244.212	US 64 west – Farmington, Taos	Southern end of US 64 concurrency
New Mexico	San Juan	Bloomfield	152.061	244.718	US 64 east – Navajo City	Northern end of US 64 concurrency
New Mexico	San Juan	Aztec	159.584	256.826	NM 516 west (Aztec Boulevard) – Farmington	Eastern end of NM 516
New Mexico	San Juan	Aztec	161.470	259.861	NM 173 east – Navajo State Park	Western end of NM 173
			174.885 0.000	281.450 0.000	New Mexico–Colorado line	
Colorado	La Plata		16.561	26.652	US 160 east – Pagosa Springs	Southern end of US 160 concurrency
Colorado	La Plata	Durango	18.369	29.562	SH 3 north	Southern end of SH 3
Colorado	La Plata	Durango	20.916	33.661	US 160 west – Cortez	Northern end of US 160 concurrency
Colorado	San Juan	No major junctions				
Colorado	Ouray	Ridgway	103.702	166.892	SH 62 west – Placerville	Eastern end of SH 62
Colorado	Montrose	Montrose	129.306	208.098	SH 90 west (Main Street) – Naturita	Eastern end of SH 90
Colorado	Montrose	Montrose	130.219	209.567	US 50 east (North San Juan Avenue) – Gunnison; North Grand Avenue west	Northern terminus
Colorado	Montrose	Montrose	130.219	209.567	US 50 west (North Townsend Avenue) – Grand Junction	Continuation north beyond northern terminus
1.000 mi = 1.609 km; 1.000 km = 0.621 mi: Concurrency terminus

== Related routes ==
- U.S. Route 50
- U.S. Route 150
- U.S. Route 250
- U.S. Route 350
- U.S. Route 450
- U.S. Route 650

== See also ==
- List of United States Numbered Highways
- Cascade Lodge
