= Pueblo Pintado, New Mexico =

Pueblo Pintado, New Mexico Náhodeeshgiizh Chʼínílíní (Navajo)
- Census-designated place
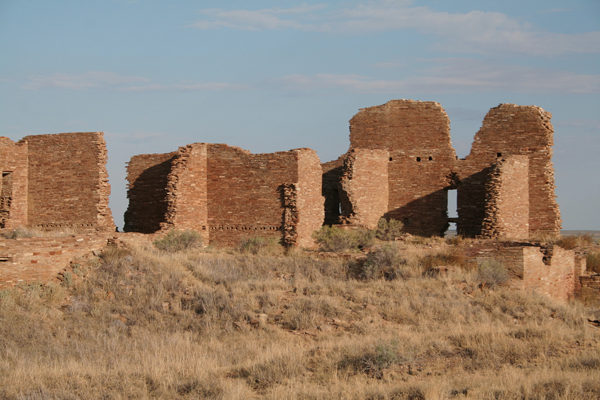
- Ruins of the Ancestral Puebloan great house located in the community

- Location in McKinley County and the state of New Mexico

- Location in the United States
- Coordinates: 35°57′58″N 107°37′20″W
- Country: United States
- State: New Mexico
- County: McKinley

Area
  - Total: 31.00 sq mi (80.29 km^{2})
  - Land: 31.00 sq mi (80.29 km^{2})
  - Water: 0 sq mi (0.00 km^{2})
- Elevation: 6,519 ft (1,987 m)

Population (2020)
  - Total: 318
  - Density: 10.3/sq mi (3.96/km^{2})
- Time zone: UTC-7 (Mountain (MST))
  - Summer (DST): UTC-6 (MDT)
- ZIP Code: 87013 (Cuba)
- Area code: 505
- FIPS code: 35-60000
- GNIS feature ID: 2409108

Pueblo Pintado (Navajo: Náhodeeshgiizh Chʼínílíní) is an unincorporated community and census-designated place (CDP) in McKinley County, New Mexico, United States. The population was 318 at the 2020 census,

== Geography ==
The community is in northeastern McKinley County, bordered by San Juan and Sandoval counties to the north. It is served by Navajo Route 9, which leads southwest 14 miles (23 km) to Whitehorse and southeast 25 miles (40 km) to Torreon. Gallup, the McKinley county seat, is 96 miles (154 km) by road to the southwest, while Cuba, with the post office that serves Pueblo Pintado, is 53 miles (85 km) to the east.

According to the U.S. Census Bureau, the Pueblo Pintado CDP has a total area of 31.0 square miles (80 km^{2}), all land. The community is in the valley of Chaco Wash, which runs through Chaco Canyon 15 miles (24 km) to the northwest and eventually joins the San Juan River near Shiprock.

=== Pueblo Pintado Great House ===
The ruins of an Ancestral Puebloan Great House stand 1 mile (1.6 km) northwest of the center of the community and 16 miles (26 km) east of Pueblo Bonito, as part of the Chaco Canyon area. The name Pueblo Pintado is Spanish for "painted village", named by a guide during an 1849 expedition. The great house is estimated to have had 90 rooms and 14 to 16 kivas; there is a great kiva to the south with an interior diameter of 58 feet (18 m). Tree ring dating puts the construction of Pueblo Pintado at 1060-1061 AD, during the height of the Chacoan construction period. The great house is now part of Chaco Culture National Historical Park.

== Demographics ==
Historical population
Census	Pop.	Note	%±
2000	247		—
2010	192		−22.3%
2020	318		65.6%
U.S. Decennial Census

At the 2000 census, there were 247 people in 72 households, including 52 families, in the CDP. The population density was 23.5 people per square mile (9.1 people/km^{2}). There were 106 housing units at an average density of 10.1 units per square mile (3.9 units/km^{2}). The racial makeup of the CDP was 90.69% Native American, 9.31% White and Hispanic or Latino of any race were 0.40%.

Of the 72 households, 34.7% had children under the age of 18 living with them, 40.3% were married couples living together, 27.8% had a female householder with no husband present, and 26.4% were non-families. 25.0% of households were one person and 2.8% were one person aged 65 or older. The average household size was 3.43 and the average family size was 4.25.

The age distribution was 41.3% under the age of 18, 7.7% from 18 to 24, 25.9% from 25 to 44, 16.6% from 45 to 64, and 8.5% 65 or older. The median age was 26 years. For every 100 females, there were 87.1 males. For every 100 females age 18 and over, there were 83.5 males.

The median household income was $14,583 and the median family income was $18,750. Males had a median income of $0 versus $0 for females. The per capita income for the CDP was $7,760. About 50.0% of families and 64.3% of the population were below the poverty line, including 89.5% of those under the age of eighteen and 66.7% of those sixty five or over.

== Education ==
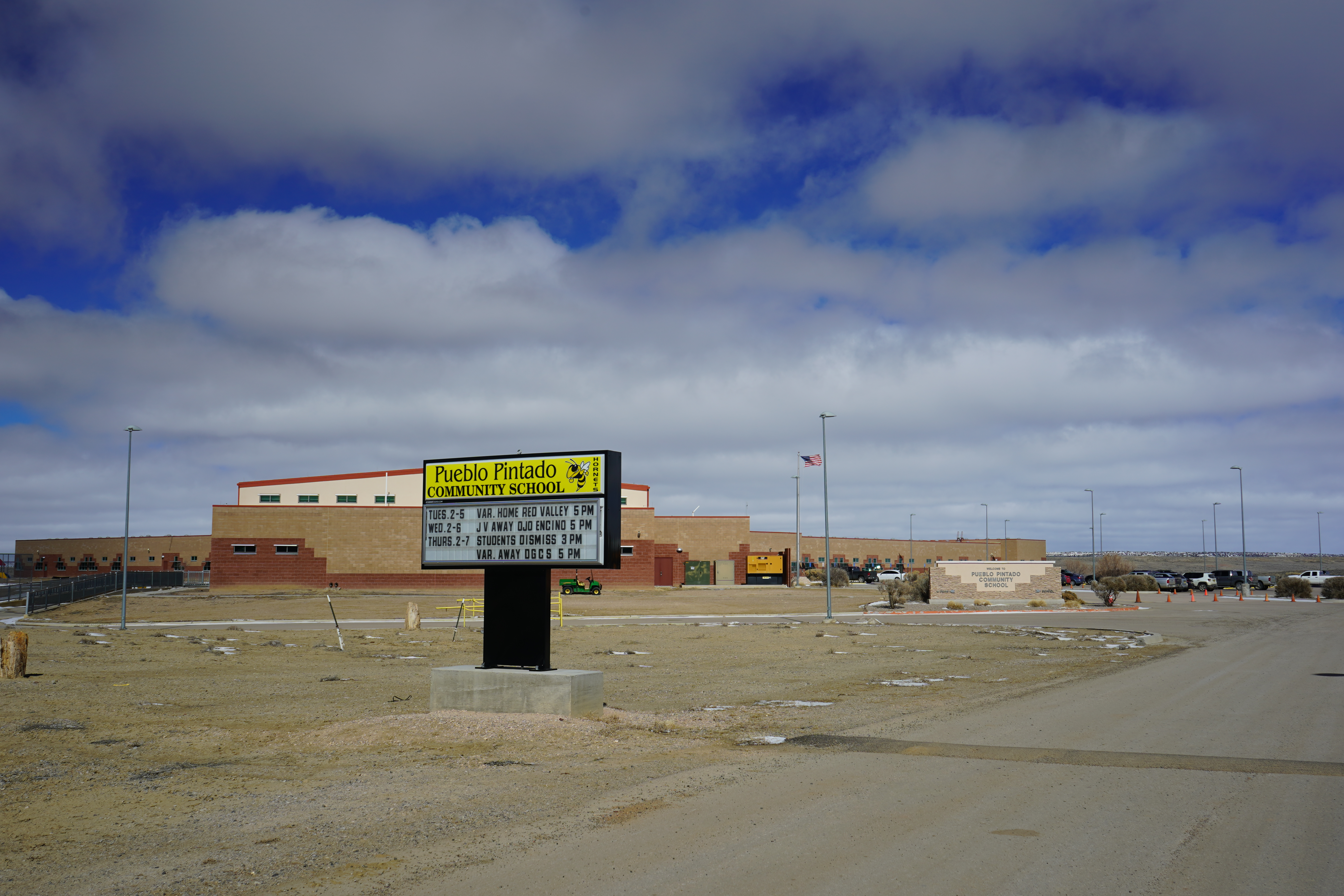
Pueblo Pintado Community School

Pueblo Pintado Community School, a K-8 school, is operated by the Bureau of Indian Education (BIE).

The community is within the Gallup-McKinley County Public Schools. Tseʼ Yiʼ Gai High School is near the CDP. Zoned schools are: Crownpoint Elementary School in Crownpoint, Crownpoint Middle School in Crownpoint, and Tseʼ Yiʼ Gai High School.

== See also ==
- List of census-designated places in New Mexico
