= Beaumont Hotel (Ouray, Colorado) =

Historic hotel in Colorado, US

- U.S. National Register of Historic Places
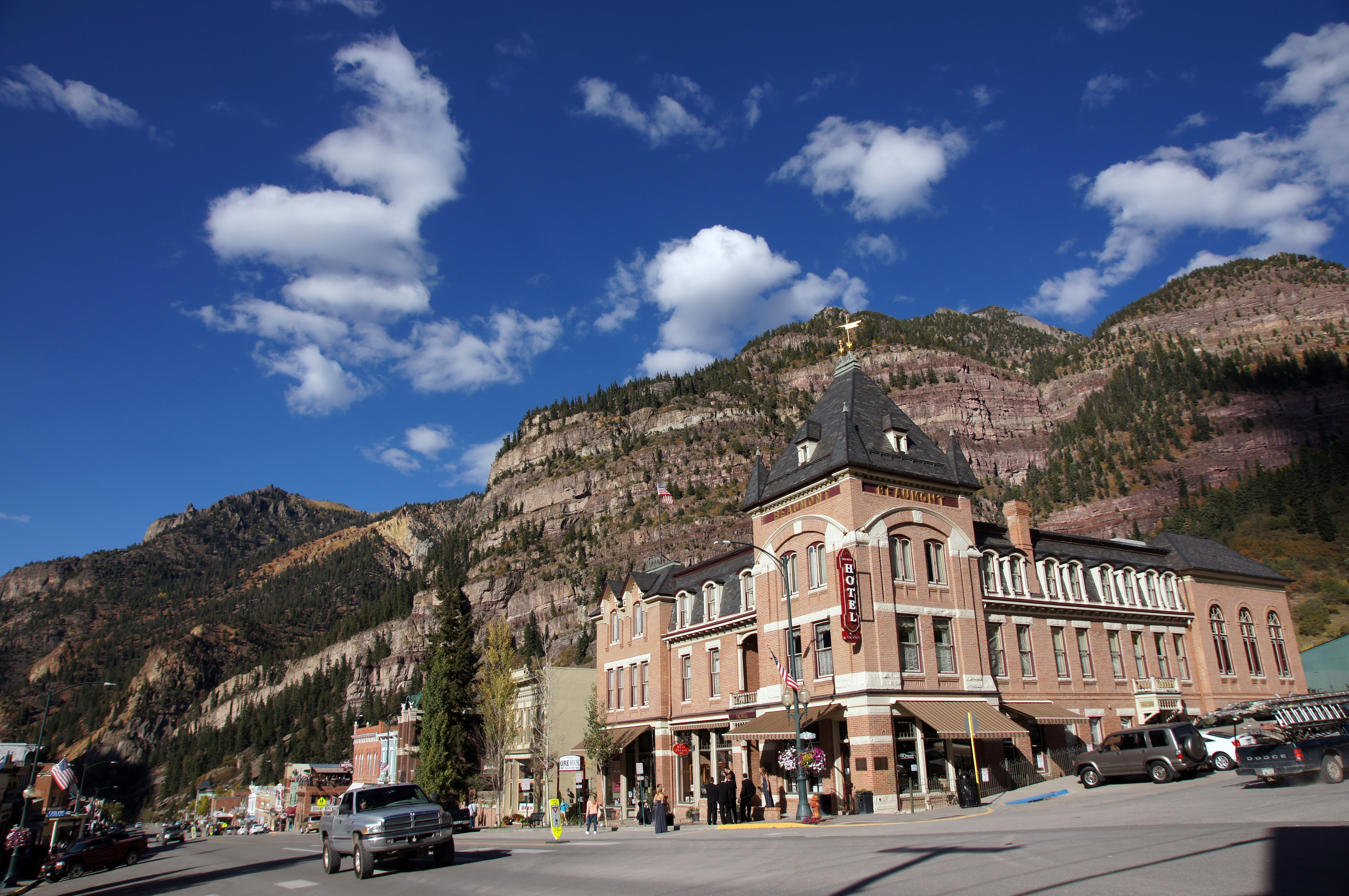
- Beaumont Hotel on Main Street in Ouray, Colorado

- Location within Colorado Location within the United States
- Location: US 550, Ouray, Colorado
- Coordinates: 38.02194°N 107.67125°W
- Area: 0.3 acres (0.12 ha)
- Built: 1886
- Architect: Otto Bulow
- Architectural style: Empire style
- NRHP reference No.: 73000483
- Added to NRHP: October 30, 1973

The Beaumont Hotel is a hotel complex in Ouray, Colorado and is on the United States National Register of Historic Places.

== History ==
The Ouray Real Estate and Building Association started construction on the Beaumont Hotel on 5 July 1886, completing it on December 15, 1886 at a cost of $75,000. Palmer House supplied employees for the grand opening, on July 25, 1887. All of the original furniture was made by Marshall Field's.

The Beaumont was one of the first hotels in the country to be wired for alternating current electricity. It had guests such as Presidents Theodore Roosevelt and Herbert Hoover. The hotel closed in 1964 due to declining tourism in the area. For over 30 years the hotel sat empty, boarded up and in disrepair. At one point part of the roof collapsed and more than once the building was considered for condemnation. The hotel was sold in 1998 and was restored, its multiple rooms combined into a more spacious arrangement — the large hotel building now has just 12 guest rooms. It reopened in 2003.

== Architecture ==
The architectural style of the hotel is a mix of Victorian, Queen Anne and French Second Empire with a slate Mansard roof. Contrary to popular belief, the Beaumont hotel is not a replica of Brown Palace in Denver. In fact, The Brown Palace was not built until after the Beaumont.

The prominent feature inside the three-story brick building is a grand staircase leading into the lobby. A rosewood dining room occupies almost half of the second floor.

== Trivia ==
On a cornerstone of the building at the corner of Main Street and 5th Avenue is a benchmark from the United States Geological Survey with an elevation of 7,800 feet (2377 m) above sea level.
