= San Luis, New Mexico =

- Unincorporated community
- Location within New Mexico
- Coordinates: 35°40′57″N 107°03′02″W
- Country: United States
- State: New Mexico
- County: Sandoval

Area
  - Total: 8.28 sq mi (21.45 km^{2})
  - Land: 8.28 sq mi (21.45 km^{2})
  - Water: 0 sq mi (0.00 km^{2})
- Elevation: 6,243 ft (1,903 m)

Population (2020)
  - Total: 32
  - Density: 3.9/sq mi (1.49/km^{2})
- Time zone: UTC-7 (Mountain (MST))
  - Summer (DST): UTC-6 (MDT)
- Area code: 505
- GNIS feature ID: 915895

San Luis is an unincorporated community and census-designated place in Sandoval County, New Mexico, United States. As of the 2020 census, San Luis had a population of 32. New Mexico State Road 279 passes through the community.

== Geography ==
San Luis is located at 35.6825261°N 107.0505975°W. According to the U.S. Census Bureau, the community has an area of 8.284 square miles (21.46 km^{2}), all land.

== Demographics ==
Historical population
Census	Pop.	Note	%±
2020	32		—
U.S. Decennial Census

== Education ==
The community's district is Cuba Independent Schools.
