= Cuba Independent Schools =

School district in New Mexico, United States

Cuba Independent School District, also known as Cuba Independent Schools, is a school district based in Cuba, New Mexico.

It operates Cuba Elementary School, Cuba Middle School, and Cuba High School.

Located in Sandoval County, the district includes La Jara, Regina, San Luis, and Torreon. It includes sections of the Laguna Pueblo and the Jicarilla Apache Indian Reservation. It also includes the unincorporated area of Counselor. The district has a total of 120 square miles (310 km^{2}) of area.

== History ==
In 1965 the district planned to give teachers higher salaries, but the budget auditor of New Mexico schools, Harry Wugalter, chose not to approve the budget. As a result, the district had the possibility of reducing teacher pay.

In 1994 the enrollment was 820. That year the district began a satellite learning program where some content was delivered remotely.

== Demographics ==
In 1994 about 33% of the students were Hispanic or Latino, and about 50% were Navajo.
