= New Mexico State Road 43 =

Former state highway in New Mexico, United States

State Road 43

Route information
- Maintained by NMDOT
- Existed: 1980s–1990s

Major junctions
- Southern end: NM 44 near La Ventana
- Northern end: End of state maintenance near La Ventana

Location
- Country: United States
- State: New Mexico
- Counties: Sandoval

Highway system
- New Mexico State Highway System; Interstate; US; State; Scenic
← NM 42	→ NM 44

New Mexico State Road 43 (NM 43) was a state highway in the US state of New Mexico. NM 43 occurred two separate times. In the late 1920s it extended from NM 33 near Cloudcroft to US 366 near Ruidosok, but by 1932 it was marked as an extension of NM 24. It remained NM 24 until 1988 when it became NM 244. The second alignment of NM 43 was created from NM 2 in Lake Arthur to NM 31 in Hagerman. This route was eliminated by 1950. The third alignment of NM 43 was created in the 1950s and was a short spur of NM 44 near La Ventana. This NM 43 was removed from the highway system in 1990.
