= New Mexico State Road 537 =

State highway in New Mexico, United States

State Road 537
- NM 537 highlighted in red

Route information
- Maintained by NMDOT
- Length: 55.943 mi (90.032 km)

Major junctions
- South end: US 550 near Cuba
- North end: US 64 near Dulce

Location
- Country: United States
- State: New Mexico
- Counties: Sandoval, Rio Arriba

Highway system
- New Mexico State Highway System; Interstate; US; State; Scenic
| ← NM 536 | → NM 538 |

State Road 537 (NM 537) is a 55.943-mile-long (90.032 km) state highway in the US state of New Mexico. NM 537's southern terminus is at U.S. Route 550 (US 550) northwest of Cuba, and the northern terminus is at US 64 south-southwest of Dulce.

== Major intersections ==
| County | Location | mi | km | Destinations | Notes |
|---|---|---|---|---|---|
| Sandoval | | 0.000 | 0.000 | US 550 | Southern terminus |
| Rio Arriba | | 55.943 | 90.032 | US 64 | Northern terminus |
1.000 mi = 1.609 km; 1.000 km = 0.621 mi
