= Eliza Pickrell Routt =

American activist and First Lady of Colorado

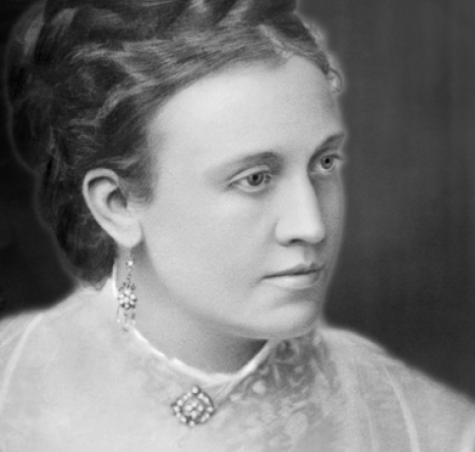
- Eliza Pickrell Routt

First Lady of Colorado

Personal details
- Born: Eliza Franklin Pickrell; 1839 Springfield, Illinois
- Died: 1907 (aged 67–68)
- Spouse: John Long Routt (m. 1874)
- Occupation: Activist, First Lady
- Known for: Original First Lady of Colorado

Eliza Pickrell Routt (1839–1907) was a pioneer in women's suffrage and the original first lady of the state of Colorado.

== Early years ==
Eliza Franklin Pickrell was born in Springfield, Illinois in 1839 (Note: Women of the Century states that Routt was born in 1842.) to Mary Ann Elkin and Benjamin Franklin Pickrell. Both of her parents were from Kentucky. She was orphaned early in her childhood and then lived at the home of her grandfather Colonel William Franklin Elkins. Along with Abraham Lincoln, he was one of the "Long Nine" who averaged six feet tall and represented Sangamon County, Illinois between 1836 and 1837 in the legislature. She received a good education, which involved study abroad and travel.

In 1874, she married Colonel John Long Routt, who was the second assistant Postmaster-General. They were married in Decatur, Illinois at the home of her uncle. They then traveled to Washington, D.C.

== Political and community works ==
The year following her marriage, Routt moved to Colorado with her husband, who President Ulysses S. Grant had appointed the Territorial Governor of Colorado. In 1876, Colorado was made a state and John Routt was the state's first governor and she was the original and an active first lady, involved in community and public works. She helped to found the Old Ladies' Home, as a member of the Ladies' Relief Society. She helped find a building for the Women's Home Club, now the YWCA, where young women lived. In 1881, she co-founded the Denver Orphans Home Association. They lived in Denver for 16 years before 1891, when John Routt was governor again. She was an active member of the Christian Church of Denver. She progressed the equal rights movement for women, as First Lady.

She supported the creation of the Botanical and Horticultural Laboratory (built 1890) as part of the Colorado Agricultural College. She was "the first female member of the State Board of Agriculture. As such, she promoted higher education for women and she was instrumental in securing the Botanical and Horticultural building for the new Domestic Economy Department" of the original Colorado Agricultural College (which became Colorado State University).

== Suffragist ==
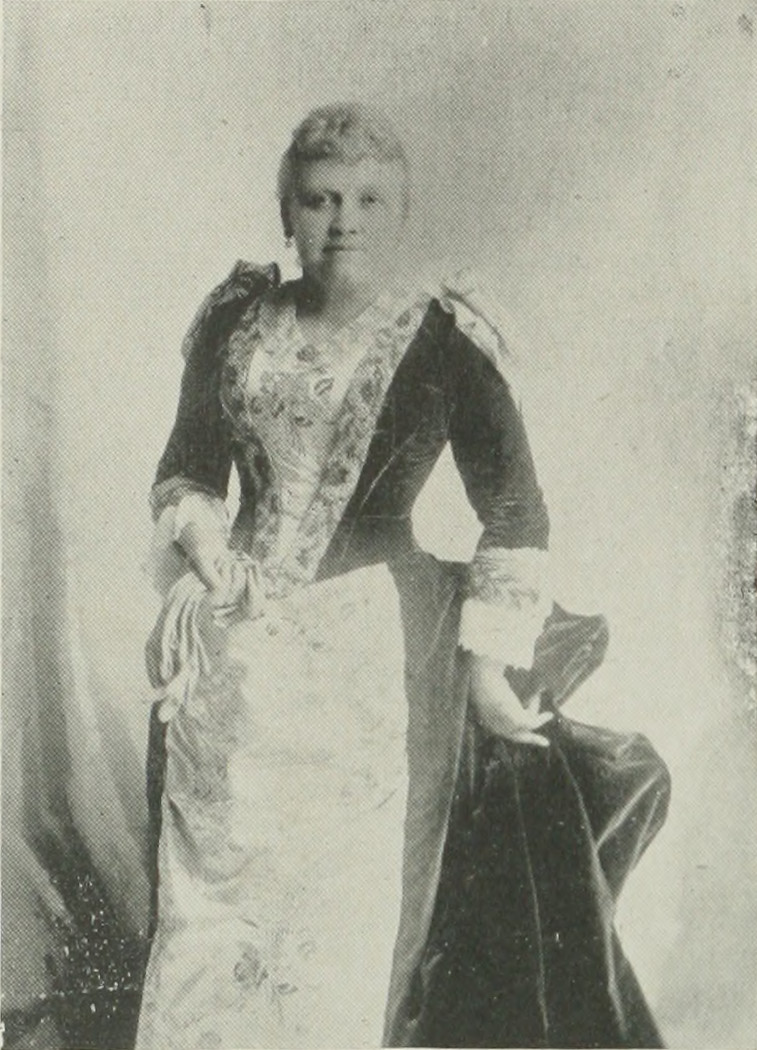
Portrait photo from A Woman of the Century

Routt joined the Non-Partisan Suffrage Association of Colorado. In 1893, she was the first woman registered to vote in Colorado, because of her efforts to obtain the right to vote for women. Colorado was the second state, after Wyoming, to grant women the right to vote. She was the elected president of The City League of Denver, an active proponent of the women's suffrage movement.

== Death and legacy ==
Routt died in 1907.

Routt was inducted into the Colorado Women's Hall of Fame in 2008.

In honor of her role in the state's suffrage movement, the Secretary of State of Colorado gives the Eliza Pickrell Routt Award for outstanding voter registration efforts to a teacher or administrator who enrolls eligible seniors to vote.
