= Otto Bulow =

American architect

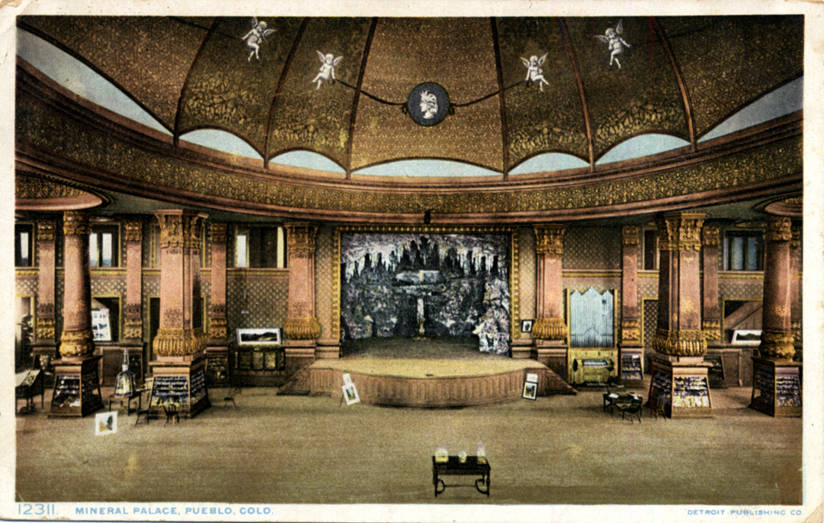
Mineral Palace

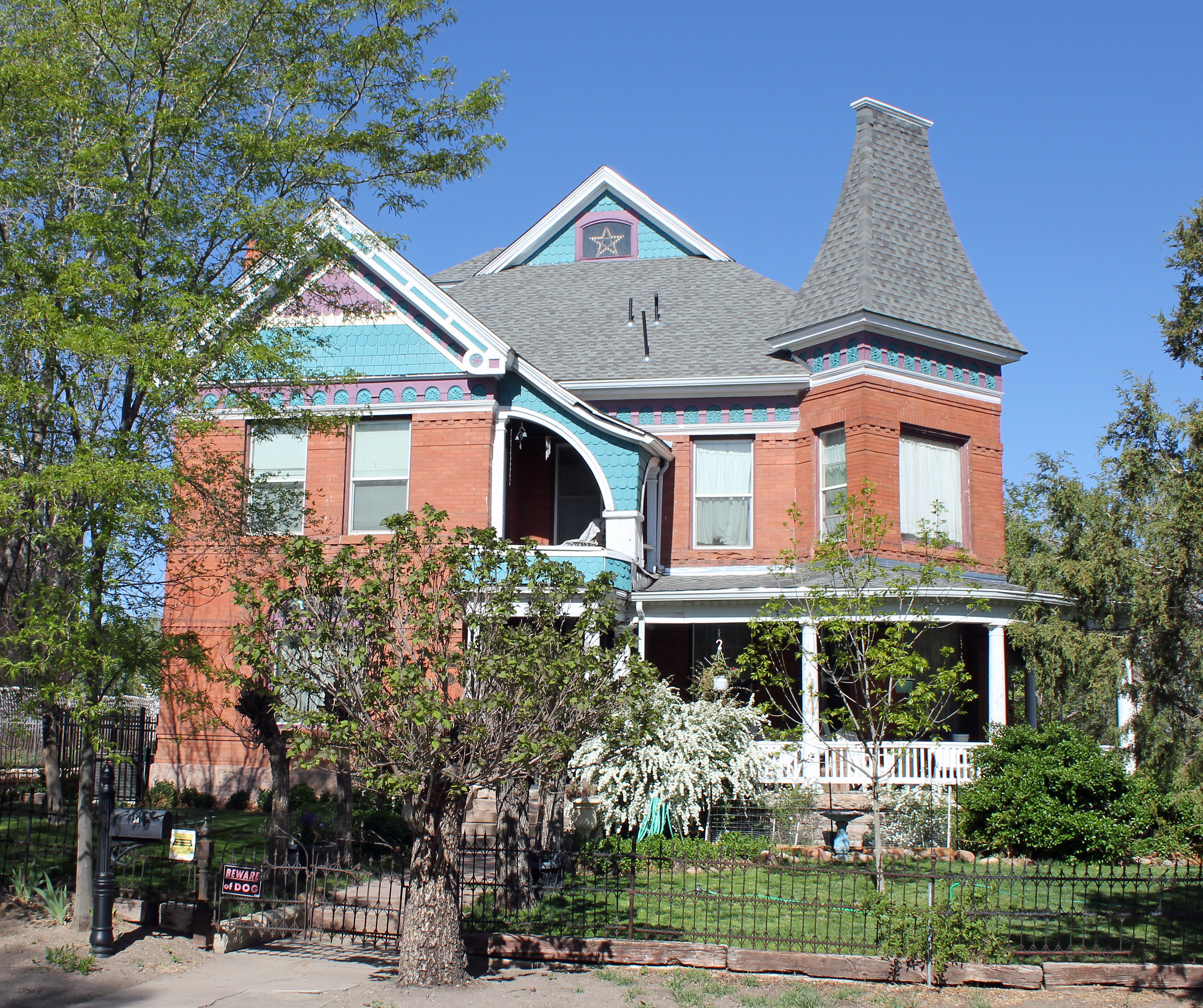
Tooke-Nuckolls House

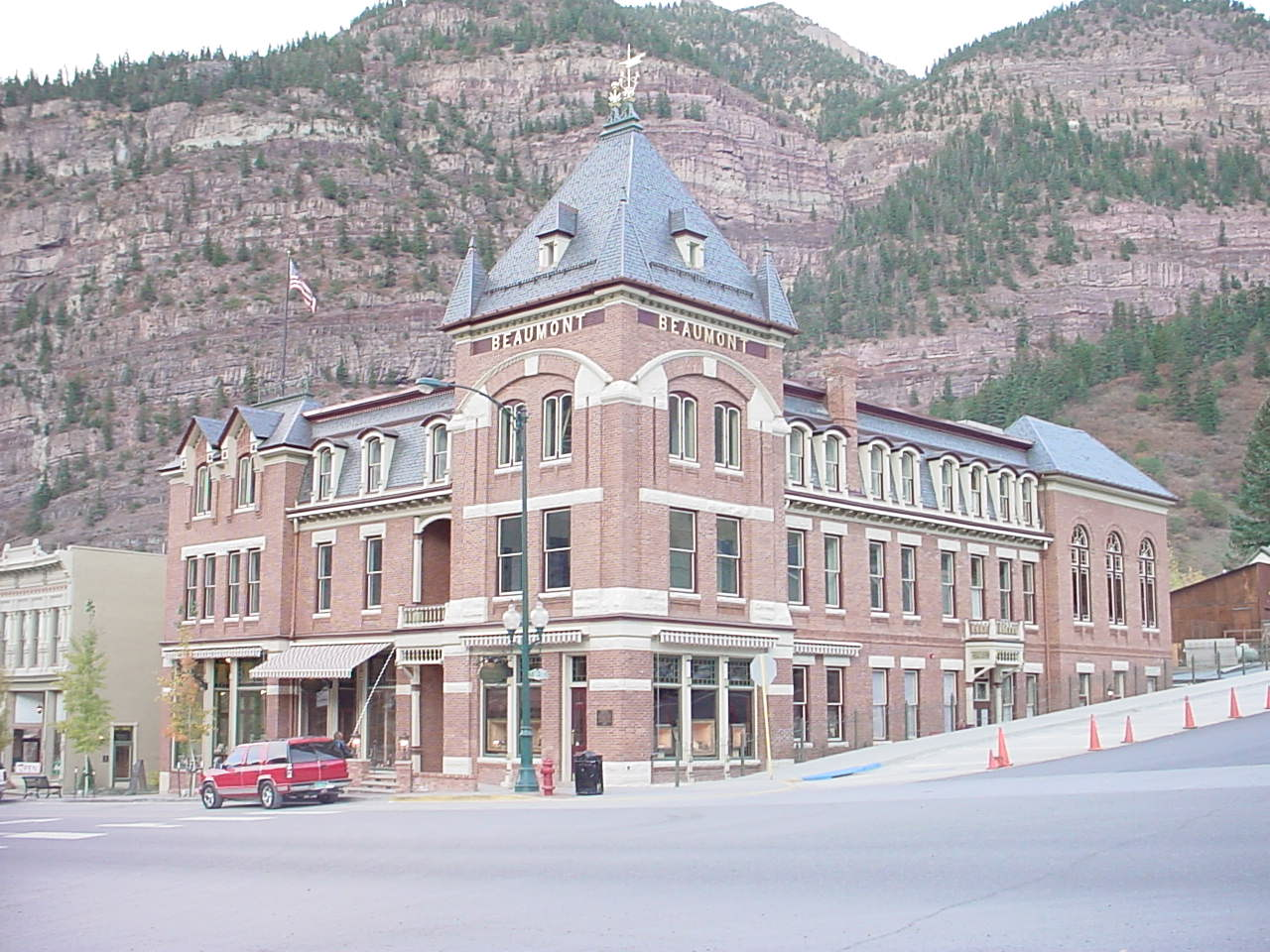
Beaumont Hotel

Otto Bulow was an architect from Sweden who worked in Pueblo, Colorado. He designed the Colorado Mineral Palace.

The Daily Chieftain listed him among a party visiting Manitou Springs, Colorado in May 1890. In 1887, he had a contract to supply 50,000 railroad ties to the Denver and Rio Grande Railway.

== Works ==
- Colorado Mineral Palace in Pueblo's Mineral Palace Park. Built in 1889, razed in 1942 but photographs remain and the El Pueblo Museum has a model of it
- 220 W. 3rd St.
- Tooke-Nuckolls House (1891) at 38 Carlile Place, NRHP listed
- Botanical and Horticultural Laboratory (1890) at Colorado Agricultural College in Fort Collins, NRHP listed
- Beaumont Hotel (Ouray, Colorado) (1887) NRHP listed
