= Twilight Peak =

Mountain in Colorado, United States

- Twilight Peak from the Million Dollar Highway

Highest point
- Elevation: 13,163 ft (4,012 m)
- Prominence: 2,338 ft (713 m)
- Isolation: 4.88 mi (7.85 km)
- Listing: North America highest peaks 121st; US highest major peaks 101st; Colorado highest major peaks 54th
- Coordinates: 37°39′47″N 107°43′37″W

Geography
- Location within Colorado
- Location: San Juan County, Colorado, U.S.
- Parent range: San Juan Mountains, Highest summit of the West Needle Mountains
- Topo map(s): USGS 7.5' topographic map Snowdon Peak, Colorado

Twilight Peak is the highest summit of the West Needle Mountains range of the San Juan Mountains System in southwestern Colorado.

The prominent 13,163-foot (4,012 m) peak is located in the Weminuche Wilderness of San Juan National Forest, 10.7 miles (17.3 km) south-southwest (bearing 199°) of the Town of Silverton in San Juan County.

== Climbing ==
The standard approach to Twilight Peak is via a trail from Molas Pass to the north. The trail leads to Crater Lake from where the summit is accessible. Adjacent to Twilight Peak are North Twilight Peak (13,075 feet) and South Twilight Peak (12,932 feet).

== See also ==
- List of mountain peaks of Colorado
- Mountains of San Juan County, Colorado
