= Tseʼ Yiʼ Gai High School =

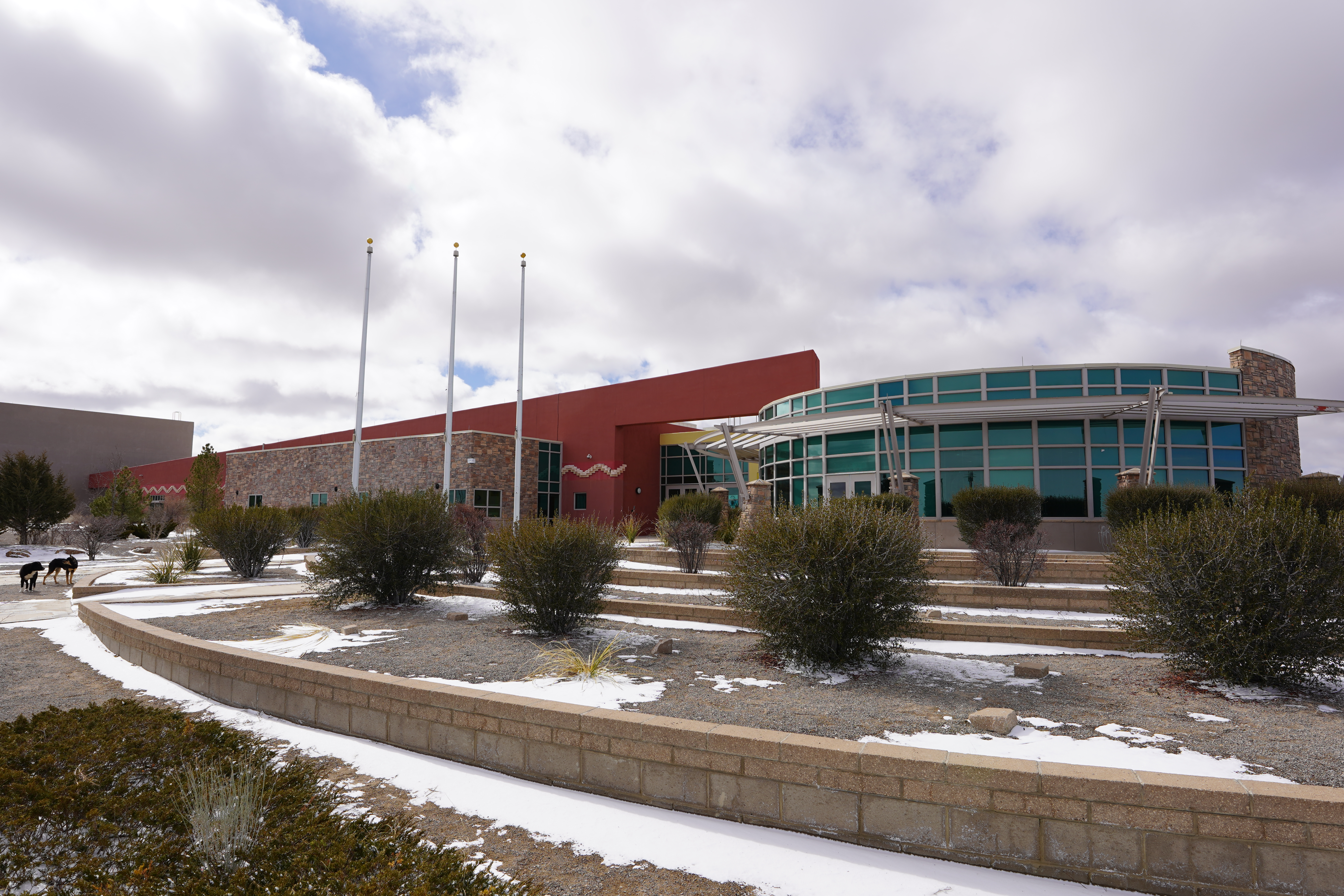

Location
- 118 Counselor Road; Pueblo Pintado, New Mexico 87013; United States
- 35.976576°N 107.635871°W

Information
- School type: Public, high school
- Founded: 2007
- School district: Gallup-McKinley County
- NCES School ID: 350111000907
- Principal: Sharon Vannier
- Staff: 9.00 (FTE)
- Grades: 6-12
- Enrollment: 131 (2023–2024)
- Student to teacher ratio: 14.65
- Colors: black, silver, turquoise
- Athletics conference: New Mexico Activities Association A/2A
- Mascot: Diné Warriors
- Website: https://tgh.gmcs.org/

Tseʼ Yiʼ Gai High School is located in Pueblo Pintado census-designated place, unincorporated McKinley County, New Mexico, with a Cuba postal address. The school is in the Gallup-McKinley County School District, and serves grades 6–12.

Its attendance boundary includes Pueblo Pintado and Ojo Encino.
