= Botanical and Horticultural Laboratory =

- U.S. National Register of Historic Places
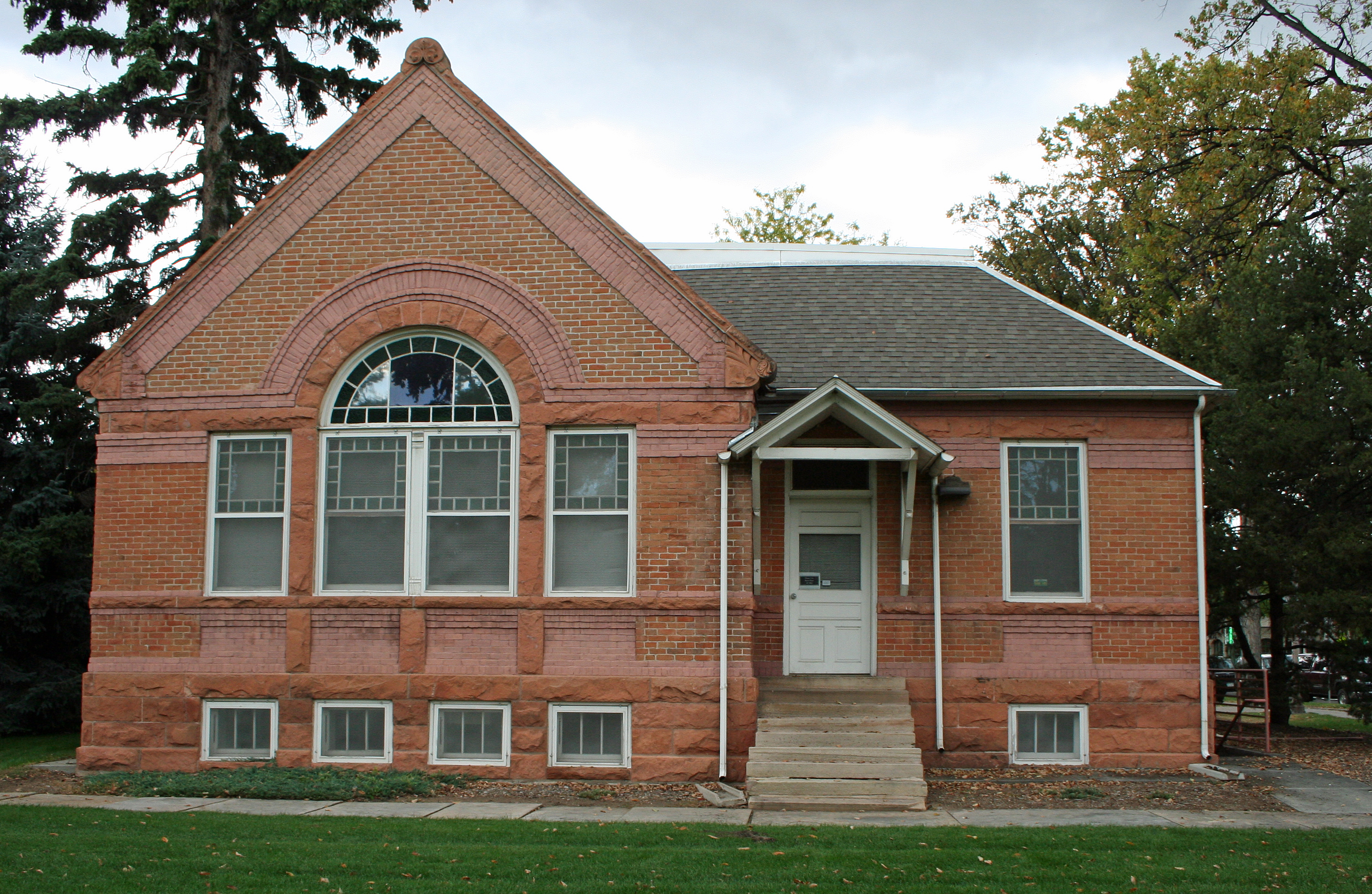
- Building in 2010

- Location within Colorado
- Location: Colorado State University campus, Fort Collins, Colorado
- Coordinates: 40.57782°N 105.07796°W
- Area: less than one acre
- Built: 1890
- Architect: Otto Bulow
- NRHP reference No.: 78003395
- Added to NRHP: September 18, 1978

The Botanical and Horticultural Laboratory on the Colorado State University campus on Fort Collins, Colorado was built in 1890. It was listed on the National Register of Historic Places in 1978. The building is now named Routt Hall.

It is a legacy of the old Colorado Agricultural College campus, in fact one of the oldest surviving of the 1878-founded college's structures. It was designed by Pueblo, Colorado architect Otto Bulow, who also designed an 1889 addition to the Old Main building. It was deemed a "fine example of the earliest architecture on the campus. The rich detailing of brick and stone exemplified in Old Main (burned: 1972) survives only in this building and Spruce Hall. In fact, the gabled section of the Bonical and Horticultural building essentially duplicated the corresponding parts of the Old Main addition."

It was refurbished in 1894 to hold the first Domestic Economy Department in Colorado, after a "Ladies Course" proved to be in high demand and a separate department became justified. The building was secured for this department by efforts of Eliza F. Routt, wife of the last territorial governor of Colorado, who was the first female member of the State Board of Agriculture and promoted higher education for women.

== See also ==
- National Register of Historic Places listings in Larimer County, Colorado
