= Molas Pass =

Mountain pass in Colorado, USA

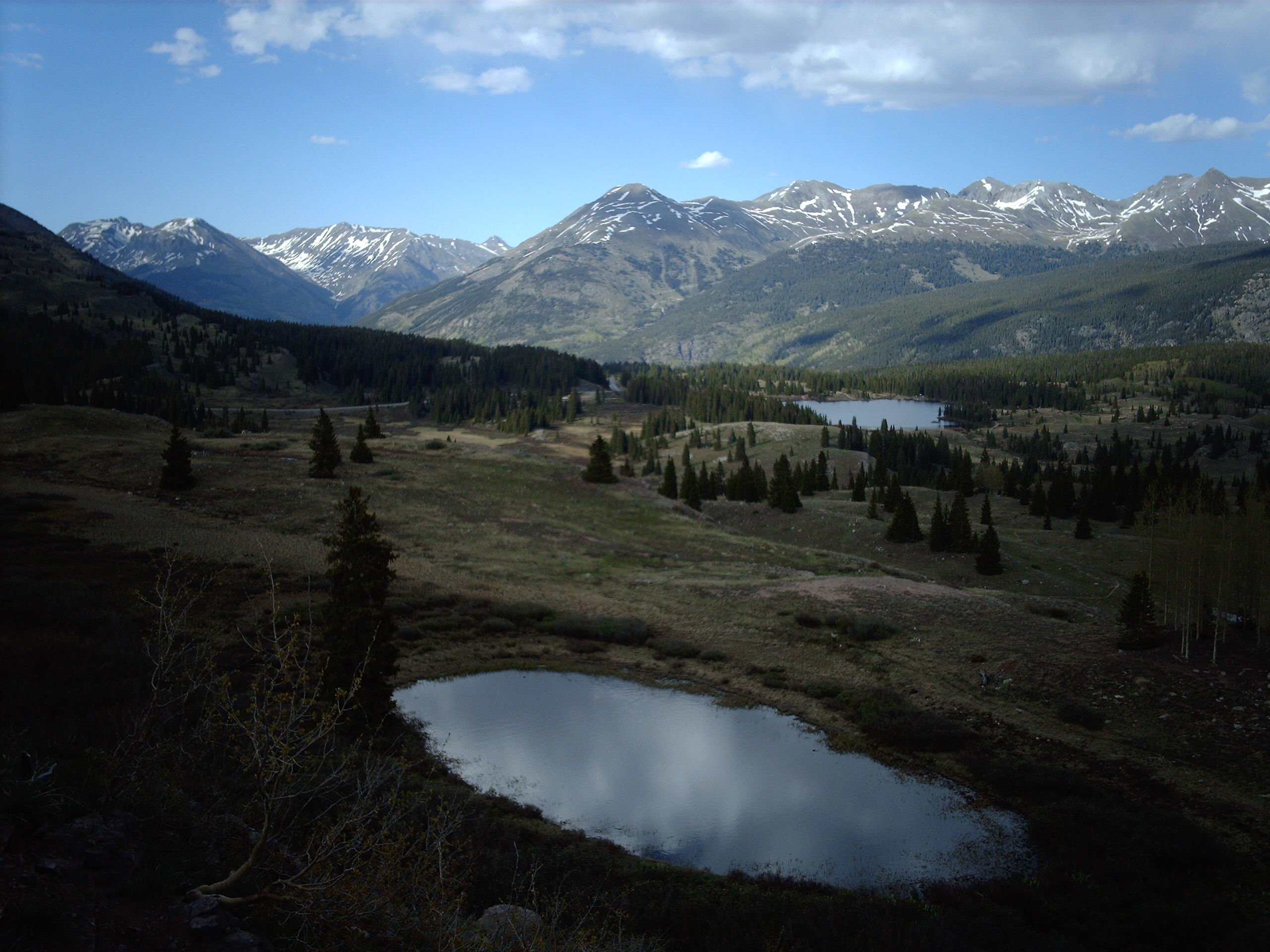
- Molas Pass
- Interactive map of Molas Pass
- Elevation: 10,910 ft (3,330 m)
- Traversed by: US 550

Third Approach
- Location: San Juan County, Colorado, U.S.
- Range: San Juan Mountains
- Coordinates: 37°44′16″N 107°41′53″W
- Topo map: USGS Snowdon Peak

Molas Pass, elevation 10,910 feet (3,330 meters), is a high mountain pass in the San Juan Mountains of western Colorado in the United States.

The pass is in the San Juan National Forest. It is traversed by the Million Dollar Highway, U.S. Highway 550 south of Silverton, which is part of the San Juan Skyway Scenic Byway.

Though it is one of the higher passes in Colorado, it has only a few switchbacks on the north approach, is considerably less intimidating than Red Mountain Pass on the same highway. It is generally kept open in the winter months.

Molas Pass is also the last mountain pass of the Iron Horse Bicycle Classic race, where riders race the train from Durango to Silverton.

== See also ==
- U.S. Route 550 in Colorado
- San Juan Mountains (Colorado)

== Gallery ==
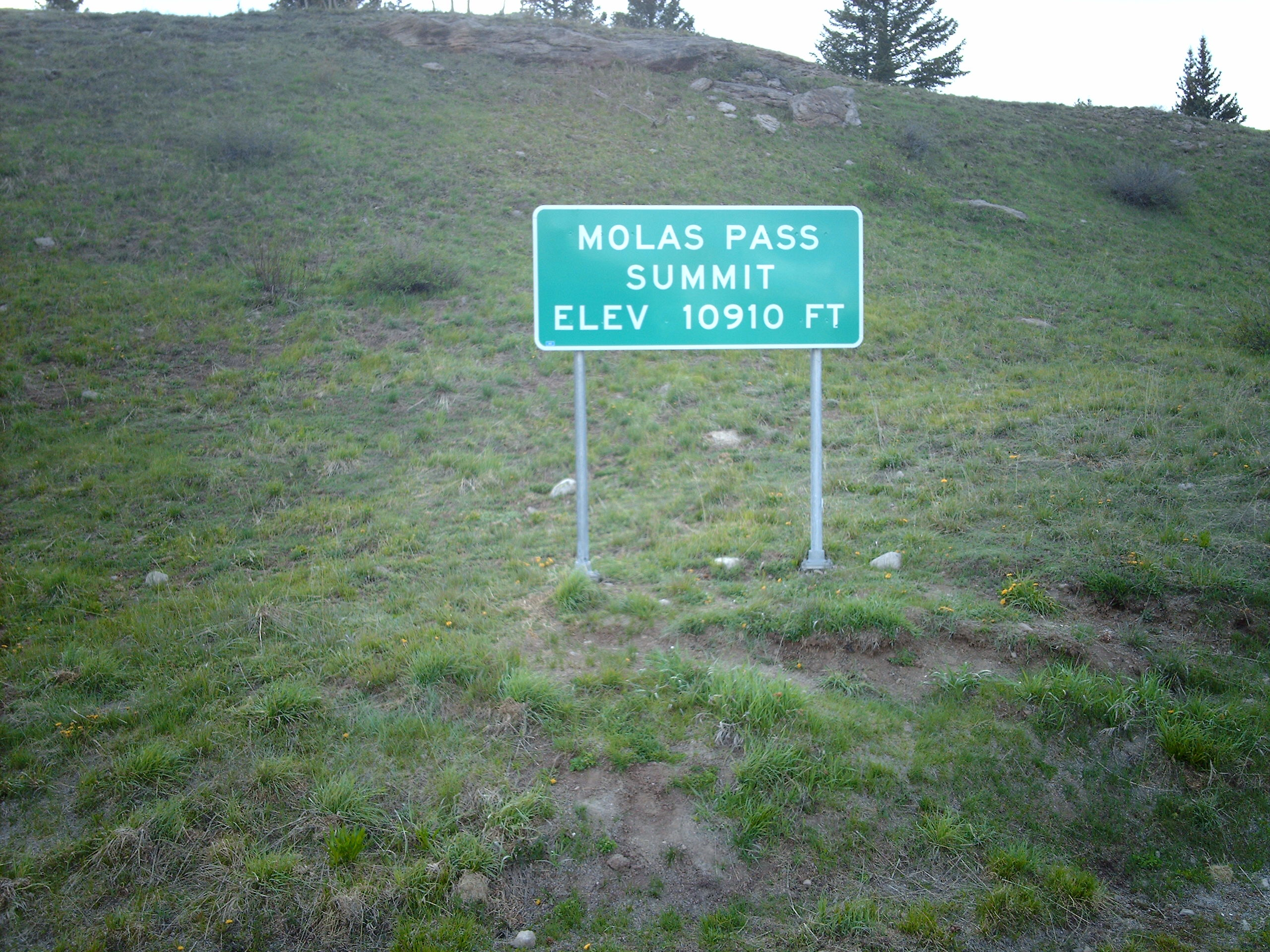
Molas Pass sign

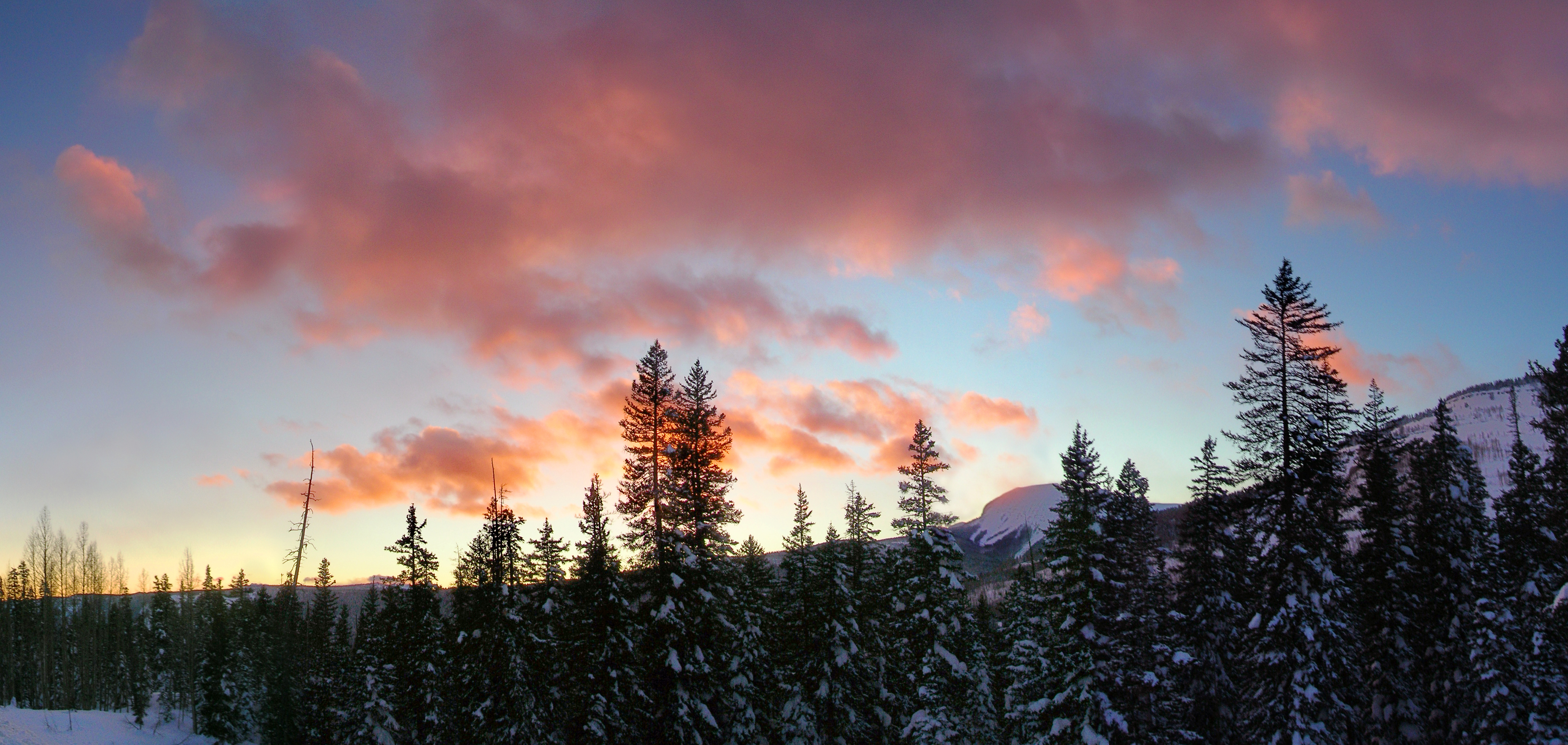
Sunset over the southern approach to Molas Pass, in March.

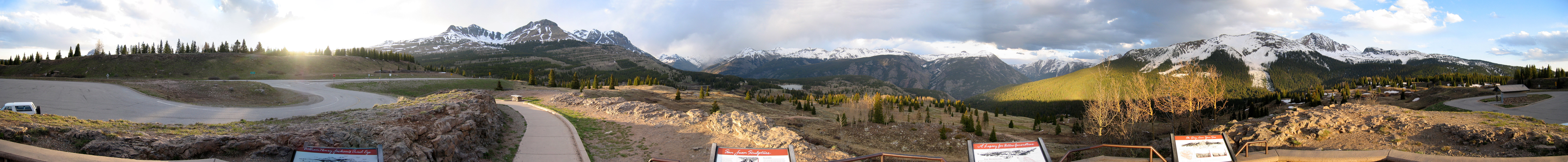
360° Panorama of Molas Pass - May 29, 2007.
