= Ojo Encino, New Mexico =

Ojo Encino, New Mexico Chéchʼiizh Biiʼ Tó (Navajo)
- Census-designated place
- Location within New Mexico Location within the United States
- Coordinates: 35°57′09″N 107°20′40″W
- Country: United States
- State: New Mexico
- County: McKinley

Area
  - Total: 0.65 sq mi (1.69 km^{2})
  - Land: 0.65 sq mi (1.69 km^{2})
  - Water: 0 sq mi (0.00 km^{2})
- Elevation: 6,749 ft (2,057 m)

Population (2020)
  - Total: 222
  - Density: 340.6/sq mi (131.49/km^{2})
- Time zone: UTC-7 (Mountain (MST))
  - Summer (DST): UTC-6 (MDT)
- ZIP Code: 87013 (Cuba)
- Area code: 505
- FIPS code: 35-53620
- GNIS feature ID: 2806726

Ojo Encino (Navajo: Chéchʼiizh Biiʼ Tó) is an unincorporated community and census-designated place (CDP) in McKinley County, New Mexico, United States, on the Navajo Nation. As of the 2020 census, the population was 222.

== Geography ==
The community is in the northeast corner of the county, 29 miles (47 km) by road west of Cuba and 120 miles (190 km) northeast of Gallup, the McKinley county seat. It is on the west side of the valley of Encino Wash, a southeast-running tributary of Torreon Wash, Arroyo Chico, and eventually Rio Puerco, a tributary of the Rio Grande.

According to the U.S. Census Bureau, the CDP has an area of 0.65 square miles (1.68 km^{2}), all land.

== Demographics ==
Historical population
Census	Pop.	Note	%±
2020	222		—
U.S. Decennial Census

Ojo Encino was first listed as a CDP prior to the 2020 census.

== Education ==
The Bureau of Indian Education operates the Ojo Encino Day School, a K-8 school. As of 2023 it has 25 employees and 173 students.

Ojo Encino is in the Gallup-McKinley County Schools school district. Zoned schools are: Crownpoint Elementary School in Crownpoint, Crownpoint Middle School in Crownpoint, and Tseʼ Yiʼ Gai High School.
