= Torreon, Sandoval County, New Mexico =

Census-designate place in Sandoval County, New Mexico, United States

Torreon, New Mexico
- Census-designated place
- Location of Torreon in Sandoval County, New Mexico

- Location in the United States
- Country: United States
- State: New Mexico
- County: Sandoval County
- Established: Est. November 10, 1955

Government
  - Type: Tribal Government
  - Chapter President: Kenneth Toledo
  - Vice President: Sherry W. Begaye
  - Secretary/Tresurer: Autumn J. Montoya
  - Council Delegate: George Tolth
  - Land Board: Alex Sandoval
- Time zone: Mountain (MST)
- Postal code: 87013

Torreon is a census-designated place (CDP) in Sandoval County, New Mexico, United States. The population was 297 at the 2000 census. It is part of the Albuquerque Metropolitan Statistical Area.

Torreon is a small community that is home to many Navajo families. Torreon is split by the Sandoval and McKinley county line. The highway coming from Cuba is Highway 197 and passes through Torreon. This same road becomes Navajo 9 after crossing the county line. To the north of Torreon lies Ojo Encino, to the south lies Ricon Marcus, to the east lies Cuba, and to the west lies Pueblo Pintado. Torreon has only one store, and sells basic food items, gasoline, and diesel. No other establishment exists in Torreon, except the Chapter House, Torreon Day School, and Torreon Navajo Mission. Pastimes for the community include softball, horse races, mud bogs, and bingo. Navajo ceremonies also play a role in the community and are practiced during the changing of the seasons.

== Chapter House ==
Torreon Chapter House is located 26 miles (42 km) southwest of Cuba on NM Highway 197. It is 67 miles (108 km) northeast of Crownpoint.

The motto of Torreon Chapter House is "Serving the Governmental needs of the Torreon/Star Lake Chapter Residents."

== Geography ==
Torreon is located at 35°47′00″N 107°12′36″W.

According to the United States Census Bureau, the CDP has a total area of 14.6 square miles (37.8 km^{2}), all land.

== Demographics ==
As of the census of 2000, there were 297 people, 73 households, and 62 families residing in the CDP. The population density was 20.4 people per square mile (7.9/km^{2}). There were 98 housing units at an average density of 6.7 per square mile (2.6/km^{2}). The racial makeup of the CDP was 91.92% Native American, 6.73% White, and 1.35% from two or more races. Hispanic or Latino of any race were 1.01% of the population.

There were 73 households, out of which 46.6% had children under the age of 18 living with them, 54.8% were married couples living together, 21.9% had a female householder with no husband present, and 13.7% were non-families. 13.7% of all households were made up of individuals, and 4.1% had someone living alone who was 65 years of age or older. The average household size was 4.07 and the average family size was 4.51.

In the CDP, the population was spread out, with 42.1% under the age of 18, 14.5% from 18 to 24, 22.6% from 25 to 44, 14.1% from 45 to 64, and 6.7% who were 65 years of age or older. The median age was 22 years. For every 100 females, there were 103.4 males. For every 100 females age 18 and over, there were 104.8 males.

The median income for a household in the CDP was $22,292, and the median income for a family was $22,292. Males had a median income of $14,583 versus $0 for females. The per capita income for the CDP was $5,417. About 27.7% of families and 18.9% of the population were below the poverty line, including 25.4% of those under the age of eighteen and none of those 65 or over.

== Education ==
Its district is Cuba Independent Schools.

The tribal K-8 school Na'Neelzhin Ji'Olta School, affiliated with the Bureau of Indian Education (BIE), has a Cuba address, but is actually in Torreon. It first opened in 1935. It is also known as the Torreon Day School and Torreon Community School.

== See also ==
- List of census-designated places in New Mexico
