= Coal Bank Pass =

Mountain pass in Colorado, USA

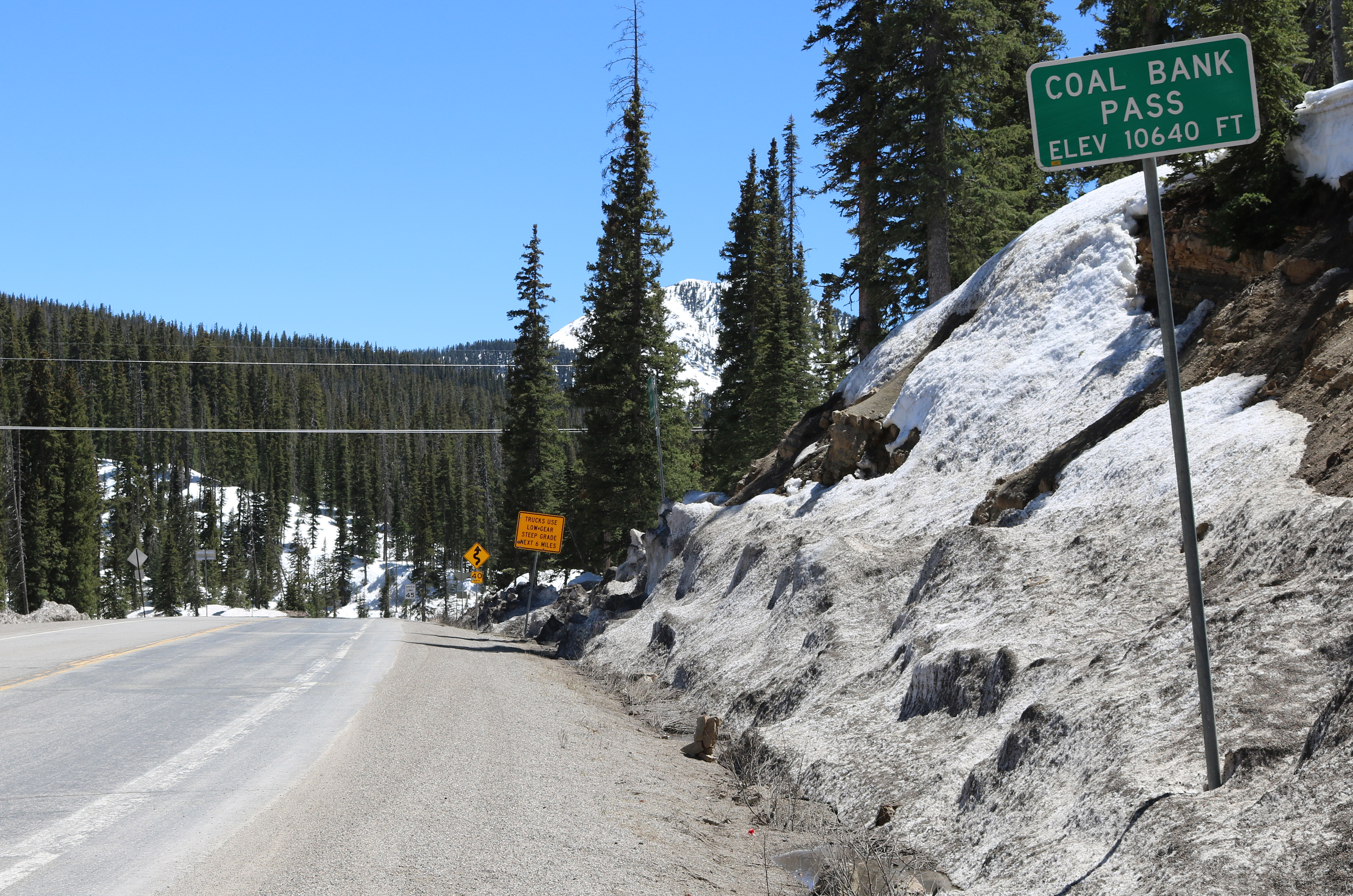
- One of the signs at the summit of the pass
- Interactive map of Coal Bank Pass
- Elevation: 10,640 ft (3,240 m)
- Traversed by: US 550

Third Approach
- Location: San Juan County, Colorado, U.S.
- Range: San Juan Mountains
- Coordinates: 37°42′02″N 107°46′37″W
- Topo map: USGS Engineer Mountain

Coal Bank Pass, elevation 10,640 feet (3,240 meters), is a mountain pass in the San Juan Mountains of western Colorado in the United States. The pass is in the San Juan National Forest.

== Route ==
The pass is traversed by the Million Dollar Highway, U.S. Highway 550 south of Silverton, which is part of the San Juan Skyway Scenic Byway. While the north side is fairly gentle, the descent on the south side is very steep (6.5%), and has a runaway truck ramp for trucks that lose control. It is basically downhill the entire way to Durango.
