= New Mexico State Road 197 =

State highway in New Mexico, United States

State Road 197

Route information
- Maintained by NMDOT
- Length: 31.825 mi (51.217 km)

Major junctions
- South end: BIA Route 9 at the Sandoval–McKinley county line
- North end: US 550 in Cuba

Location
- Country: United States
- State: New Mexico
- Counties: Sandoval

Highway system
- New Mexico State Highway System; Interstate; US; State; Scenic
← NM 196	→ NM 198

State Road 197 (NM 197) is a 31.825-mile-long (51.217 km) state highway in the US state of New Mexico. NM 197's southern terminus is at the end of state maintenance at the Sandoval–McKinley county line, and the northern terminus is at U.S. Route 550 (US 550) in Cuba.

== Major intersections ==
The entire route is in Sandoval County.

Location	mi	km	Destinations	Notes
	0.000	0.000	Sandoval–McKinley county line	Southern terminus
Cuba	31.825	51.217	US 550	Northern terminus
1.000 mi = 1.609 km; 1.000 km = 0.621 mi

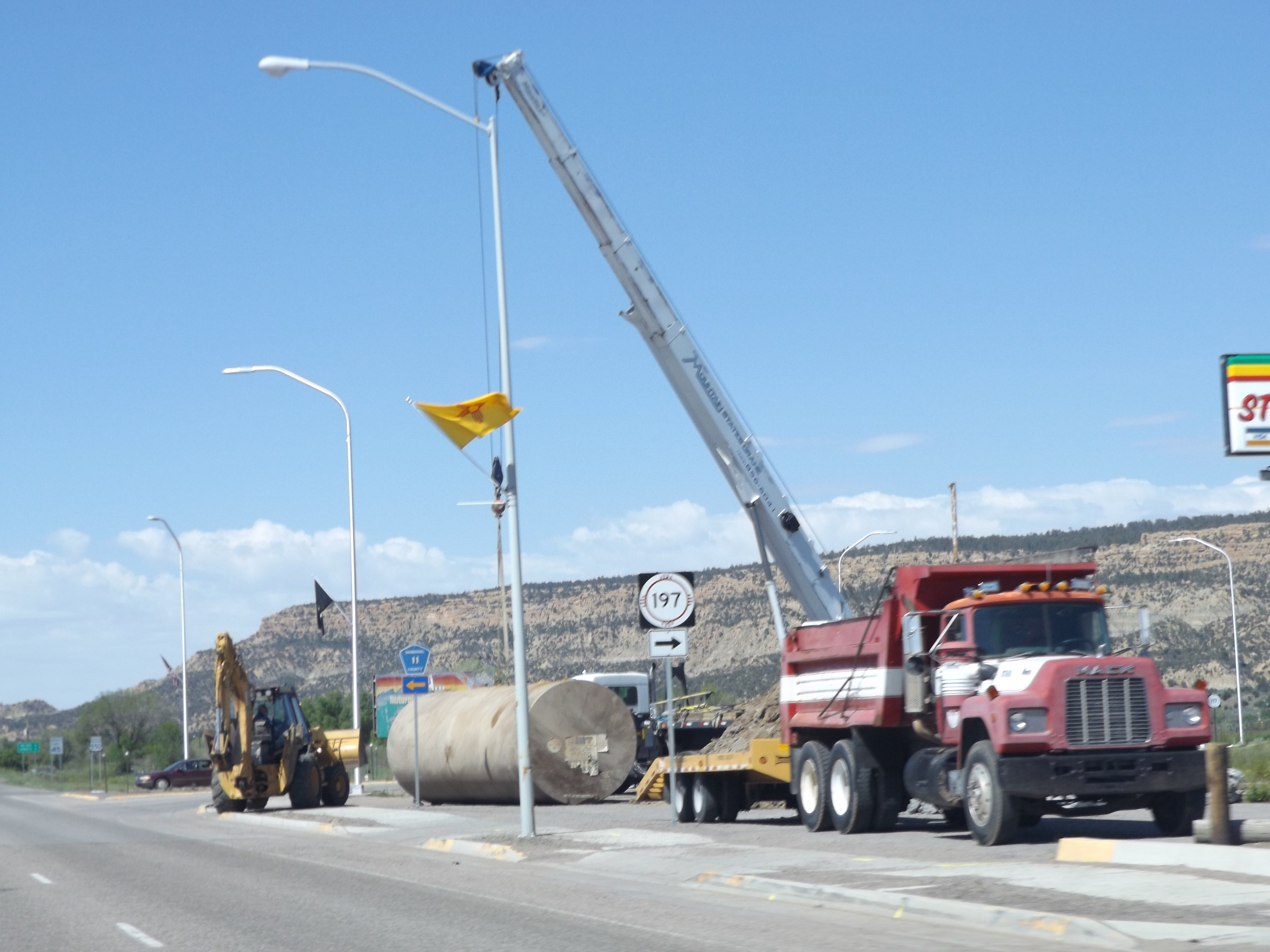
