= La Jara, New Mexico =

- CDP
- Location of La Jara, New Mexico

- Location in the United States
- Coordinates: 36°5′45″N 106°57′23″W
- Country: United States
- State: New Mexico
- County: Sandoval

Area
  - Total: 14.25 sq mi (36.91 km^{2})
  - Land: 14.25 sq mi (36.91 km^{2})
  - Water: 0 sq mi (0.00 km^{2})
- Elevation: 7,129 ft (2,173 m)

Population (2020)
  - Total: 177
  - Density: 12.4/sq mi (4.79/km^{2})
- Time zone: UTC-7 (Mountain (MST))
  - Summer (DST): UTC-6 (MDT)
- ZIP code: 87027
- Area code: 575
- FIPS code: 35-37490
- GNIS feature ID: 0907648

La Jara is a census-designated place (CDP) in Sandoval County, New Mexico, United States. As of the 2020 census, La Jara had a population of 177. It is part of the Albuquerque Metropolitan Statistical Area .

== Geography ==
La Jara is located at 36°5′45″N 106°57′23″W (36.095771, -106.956415).

According to the United States Census Bureau, the CDP has a total area of 14.2 square miles (37 km^{2}), all land.

== Demographics ==
Historical population
Census	Pop.	Note	%±
2020	177		—
U.S. Decennial Census

As of the census of 2000, there were 209 people, 93 households, and 62 families residing in the CDP. The population density was 14.7 inhabitants per square mile (5.7/km^{2}). There were 140 housing units at an average density of 9.9 per square mile (3.8/km^{2}). The racial makeup of the CDP was 75.60% White, 1.44% Native American, 21.05% from other races, and 1.91% from two or more races. Hispanic or Latino of any race were 79.43% of the population.

There were 93 households, out of which 23.7% had children under the age of 18 living with them, 52.7% were married couples living together, 8.6% had a female householder with no husband present, and 33.3% were non-families. 26.9% of all households were made up of individuals, and 14.0% had someone living alone who was 65 years of age or older. The average household size was 2.25 and the average family size was 2.69.

In the CDP, the population was spread out, with 19.1% under the age of 18, 3.8% from 18 to 24, 20.6% from 25 to 44, 36.8% from 45 to 64, and 19.6% who were 65 years of age or older. The median age was 49 years. For every 100 females, there were 117.7 males. For every 100 females age 18 and over, there were 113.9 males.

The median income for a household in the CDP was $39,444, and the median income for a family was $46,406. Males had a median income of $28,542 versus $23,558 for females. The per capita income for the CDP was $19,691. About 10.8% of families and 6.6% of the population were below the poverty line, including none of those under the age of eighteen or sixty five or over.

== Education ==
Its district is Cuba Independent Schools.

== See also ==
- List of census-designated places in New Mexico
