= Cuba, New Mexico =

Village in Sandoval County, New Mexico, United States

- Village
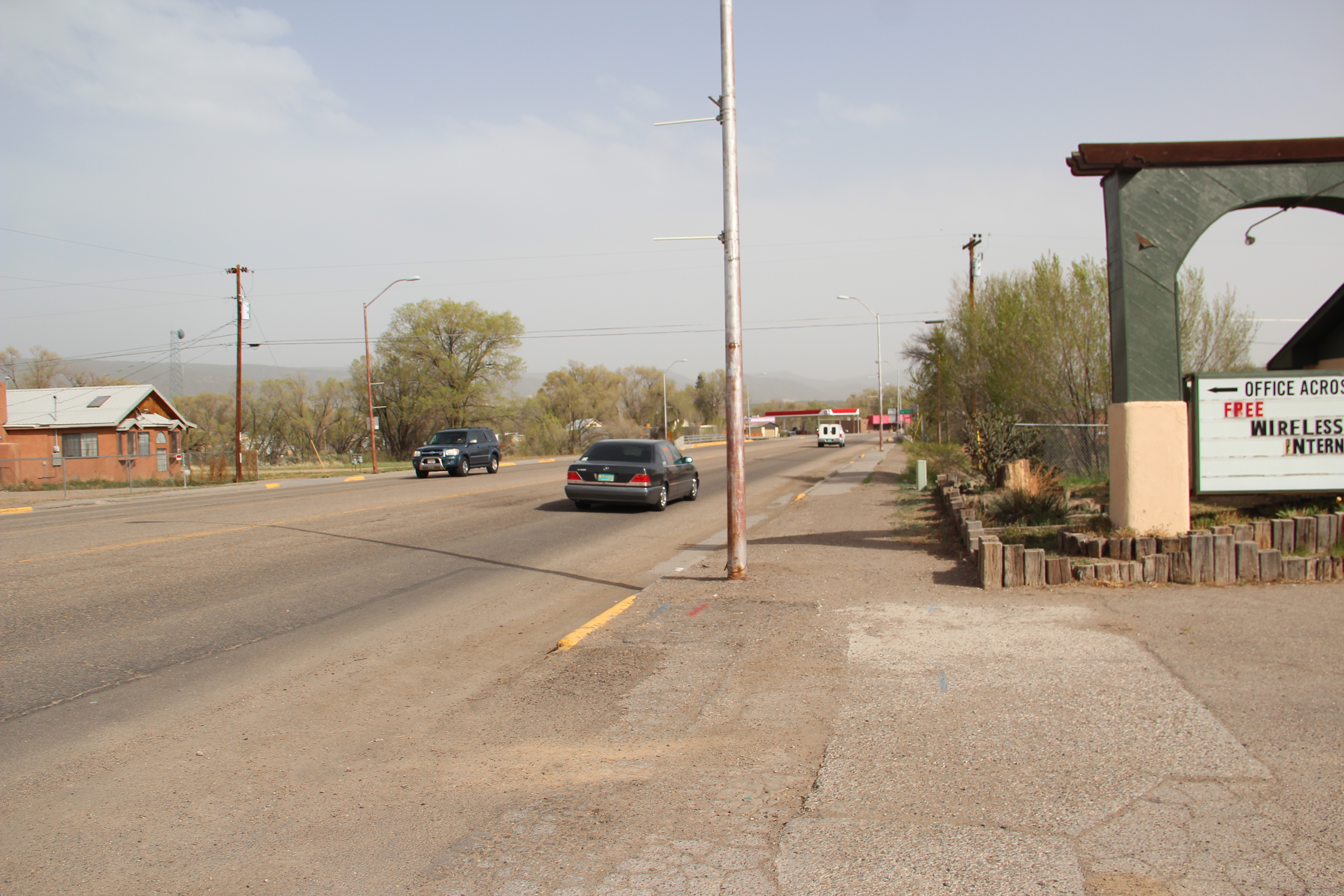
- U.S. Route 550 in Cuba

- Location of Cuba, New Mexico

- Location in New Mexico Location in the United States
- Coordinates: 36°00′53″N 106°58′05″W
- Country: United States
- State: New Mexico
- County: Sandoval

Area
  - Total: 3.26 sq mi (8.45 km^{2})
  - Land: 3.26 sq mi (8.45 km^{2})
  - Water: 0 sq mi (0.00 km^{2})
- Elevation: 6,884 ft (2,098 m)

Population (2020)
  - Total: 628
  - Density: 192.4/sq mi (74.28/km^{2})
- Time zone: UTC-7 (Mountain (MST))
  - Summer (DST): UTC-6 (MDT)
- ZIP code: 87013
- Area code: 575
- FIPS code: 35-19150
- GNIS feature ID: 2413545
- Website: www.cubanm.gov

Cuba is a village in Sandoval County, New Mexico, United States. As of the 2020 census, Cuba had a population of 628. It is part of the Albuquerque Metropolitan Statistical Area.

== Description ==
Located along the busy U.S. Route 550, Cuba has several motels, restaurants and bars. In 2005 and 2019, the National Christmas Tree was harvested from the Santa Fe National Forest near Cuba.

== Geography ==
According to the United States Census Bureau, the village has a total area of 1.3 square miles (3.4 km^{2}), all land.

== Demographics ==
Historical population
Census	Pop.	Note	%±
1970	415		—
1980	609		46.7%
1990	760		24.8%
2000	590		−22.4%
2010	731		23.9%
2020	628		−14.1%
U.S. Decennial Census

As of the census of 2000, there were 590 people, 222 households, and 152 families residing in the village. The population density was 465.3 inhabitants per square mile (179.7/km^{2}). There were 290 housing units at an average density of 228.7 per square mile (88.3/km^{2}). The racial makeup of the village was 44.07% white, 0.17% African American, 26.78% Native American, 0.68% Asian, 23.90% from other races, and 4.41% from two or more races. Hispanic or Latino of any race were 60.34% of the population.

There were 222 households, out of which 38.3% had children under the age of 18 living with them, 43.7% were married couples living together, 18.9% had a female householder with no husband present, and 31.1% were non-families. 29.3% of all households were made up of individuals, and 8.1% had someone living alone who was 65 years of age or older. The average household size was 2.66 and the average family size was 3.24.

In the village, the population was spread out, with 33.2% under the age of 18, 7.8% from 18 to 24, 23.9% from 25 to 44, 21.9% from 45 to 64, and 13.2% who were 65 years of age or older. The median age was 32 years. For every 100 females, there were 99.3 males. For every 100 females age 18 and over, there were 95.0 males.

The median income for a household in the village was $21,538, and the median income for a family was $26,250. Males had a median income of $26,667 versus $17,000 for females. The per capita income for the village was $11,192. About 36.5% of families and 41.3% of the population were below the poverty line, including 54.1% of those under age 18 and 40.0% of those age 65 or over.

== Climate ==
According to the Köppen Climate Classification system, Cuba has an oceanic climate, abbreviated "Cfb" on climate maps. The hottest temperature recorded in Cuba was 102 °F (38.9 °C) on July 3, 1953, while the coldest temperature recorded was −38 °F (−38.9 °C) on February 6, 1982.

Climate data for Cuba, New Mexico, 1991–2020 normals, extremes 1938–present
Month	Jan	Feb	Mar	Apr	May	Jun	Jul	Aug	Sep	Oct	Nov	Dec	Year
Record high °F (°C)	66 (19)	69 (21)	86 (30)	84 (29)	96 (36)	99 (37)	102 (39)	98 (37)	97 (36)	88 (31)	75 (24)	74 (23)	102 (39)
Mean daily maximum °F (°C)	43.0 (6.1)	47.0 (8.3)	56.0 (13.3)	64.3 (17.9)	73.5 (23.1)	84.6 (29.2)	86.7 (30.4)	84.1 (28.9)	78.5 (25.8)	66.6 (19.2)	53.7 (12.1)	43.5 (6.4)	65.1 (18.4)
Daily mean °F (°C)	28.4 (−2.0)	33.2 (0.7)	40.3 (4.6)	46.7 (8.2)	54.8 (12.7)	64.7 (18.2)	70.2 (21.2)	68.3 (20.2)	61.1 (16.2)	49.0 (9.4)	38.3 (3.5)	29.7 (−1.3)	48.7 (9.3)
Mean daily minimum °F (°C)	13.9 (−10.1)	19.4 (−7.0)	24.6 (−4.1)	29.2 (−1.6)	36.0 (2.2)	44.8 (7.1)	53.7 (12.1)	52.5 (11.4)	43.7 (6.5)	31.4 (−0.3)	22.9 (−5.1)	15.8 (−9.0)	32.3 (0.2)
Record low °F (°C)	−37 (−38)	−38 (−39)	−14 (−26)	−6 (−21)	10 (−12)	20 (−7)	30 (−1)	29 (−2)	15 (−9)	−2 (−19)	−30 (−34)	−32 (−36)	−38 (−39)
Average precipitation inches (mm)	0.77 (20)	0.73 (19)	0.92 (23)	0.74 (19)	0.78 (20)	0.61 (15)	2.18 (55)	2.03 (52)	1.22 (31)	1.22 (31)	0.78 (20)	0.82 (21)	12.80 (325)
Average snowfall inches (cm)	7.6 (19)	7.0 (18)	5.3 (13)	0.5 (1.3)	0.1 (0.25)	0.1 (0.25)	0.0 (0.0)	0.0 (0.0)	0.0 (0.0)	1.5 (3.8)	3.5 (8.9)	8.5 (22)	34.1 (86.5)
Average precipitation days (≥ 0.01 in)	3.0	3.7	3.8	2.9	3.8	2.9	7.2	9.5	5.2	4.1	3.3	3.9	53.3
Average snowy days (≥ 0.1 in)	2.7	2.5	1.6	0.7	0.1	0.1	0.0	0.0	0.0	0.3	1.5	2.8	12.3
Source 1: NOAA
Source 2: xmACIS2

== Education ==
Its district is Cuba Independent Schools.

There are multiple Bureau of Indian Education (BIE)-operated federal schools and BIE-affiliated tribal schools which have Cuba postal addresses but which are not in Cuba:

- Na'Neelzhin Ji'Olta School, a tribal K-8 school, is actually in Torreon.
- Ojo Encino Day School, a BIE school, is in Ojo Encino - It is 27 miles (43 km) west of Cuba
- Pueblo Pintado Community School, a BIE school, is in Pueblo Pintado

Tseʼ Yiʼ Gai High School of the Gallup-McKinley County Schools school district is in Pueblo Pintado, and has a Cuba postal address (though it is not in Cuba).
