= E. J. Workman =

American atmospheric physicist

Everly John "Jack" Workman (July 2, 1899, Loudonville, Ohio – December 27, 1982, Santa Barbara, California) was an American atmospheric physicist, known for the Workman-Reynolds effect, discovered in 1950 by him and his colleague Stephen E. Reynolds, State Engineer of New Mexico from 1955 to 1990.

== Education and career ==
E. John Workman graduated in 1924 with a bachelor's degree from Whitman College. In his graduating class were Walter Brattain, Walker Bleakney, and Vladimir Rojansky. Workman received his Ph.D. in 1930 from the University of Virginia. His Ph.D. thesis was published in Physical Review. As an NRC Fellow, during the years from 1930 to 1933 he worked at the Bartol Research Foundation of the Franklin Institute in Philadelphia and then at Caltech in Pasadena. From 1933 to 1946 he was a professor in the physics department of the University of New Mexico (UNM) and in his third year there became the head of the department. During those years he was often on leave of absence from his academic duties so that he could carry out specific research projects. In 1936 he was elected a Fellow of the American Physical Society. In 1941 the United States Government appointed him Director of Research Projects.

In 1946 Workman resigned from the University of New Mexico (UNM) in a dispute with the UNM's new president and was hired by the New Mexico School of Mines (which years later was renamed the New Mexico Institute of Mining and Technology). Shortly after being hired, Workman became the interim president of the New Mexico School of Mines and after three years in the interim presidency became the tenured president. He presided over the construction of the Langmuir Laboratory for Atmospheric Research on a site on South Baldy at an altitude of 3240 meters in the Magdalena Mountains. The construction of the laboratory was finished in the summer of 1963.

In 1965 he retired from the New Mexico Institute of Mining and Technology in order to help establish the University of Hawaiʻi at Hilo's Cloud Physics Laboratory. In 1970 he retired as director of the Cloud Physics Laboratory and went to live in Santa Barbara, where he died in 1982.

== Selected publications ==
- Workman, E. J. (1930). "A New Method of Measuring the Variation of the Specific Heats (c_{p}) of Gases with Pressure". Physical Review. 36 (6): 1083–1090. Bibcode:1930PhRv...36.1083W. doi:10.1103/PhysRev.36.1083.
- —— (1931). "The Variation of the Specific Heats (C_{p}) of Oxygen, Nitrogen and Hydrogen with Pressure". Physical Review. 37 (10): 1345–1355. Bibcode:1931PhRv...37.1345W. doi:10.1103/PhysRev.37.1345.
- —— (1933). "Secondary Effects in Ionization by Hard Gamma-Rays". Physical Review. 43 (11): 859–870. Bibcode:1933PhRv...43..859W. doi:10.1103/PhysRev.43.859.
- ——; Beams, J. W.; Snoddy, L. B. (1936). "Photographic Study of Lightning". Physics. 7 (10): 375–379. Bibcode:1936Physi...7..375W. doi:10.1063/1.1745344.
- Holzer, R. E.; ——; Snoddy, L. B. (1938). "Photographic Study of Lightning". Journal of Applied Physics. 9 (2): 134–138. Bibcode:1938JAP.....9..134H. doi:10.1063/1.1710395.
- Holzer, R. E.; —— (1939). "Photographs of Unusual Discharges Occurring During Thunderstorms". Journal of Applied Physics. 10 (9): 659–662. Bibcode:1939JAP....10..659H. doi:10.1063/1.1707359.
- ——; Holzer, R. E. (1939). "A Recording Generating Voltmeter for the Study of Atmospheric Electricity". Review of Scientific Instruments. 10 (5): 160–163. Bibcode:1939RScI...10..160W. doi:10.1063/1.1751510.
- ——; Holzer, R. E.; Pelsor, G. T. (1942). The electrical structure of thunderstorms (report: No. NACA-TN-864).
- —— (1948). "Thunderstorm electricity". Journal of Geophysical Research. 53 (3): 278. Bibcode:1948TeMAE..53..278W. doi:10.1029/TE053i003p00278.
- ——; Reynolds, S. E. (1948). "A Suggested Mechanism for the Generation of Thunderstorm Electricity". Physical Review. 74 (6): 709. Bibcode:1948PhRv...74..709W. doi:10.1103/PhysRev.74.709.
- ——; Reynolds, S. E. (1949). "Electrical Activity as Related to Thunderstorm Cell Growth". Bulletin of the American Meteorological Society. 30 (4): 142–144. JSTOR 26258148.
- ——; Reynolds, S. E. (1950). "Electrical Phenomena Occurring during the Freezing of Dilute Aqueous Solutions and Their Possible Relationship to Thunderstorm Electricity". Physical Review. 78 (3): 254–259. Bibcode:1950PhRv...78..254W. doi:10.1103/PhysRev.78.254.
- ——; Reynolds, S. E. (1952). "Production of Electric Charges on Water Drops". Nature. 169 (4313): 1108–1109. Bibcode:1952Natur.169.1108W. doi:10.1038/1691108b0. S2CID 4240553.
- ——; Truby, Frank K.; Drost-Hansen, W. (1954). "Electrical Conduction in Halide-Contaminated Ice". Physical Review. 94 (4): 1073. Bibcode:1954PhRv...94.1073W. doi:10.1103/PhysRev.94.1073.
- ——; Brook, M.; Kitagawa, N. (1960). "Lightning and charge storage". Journal of Geophysical Research. 65 (5): 1513–1517. Bibcode:1960JGR....65.1513W. doi:10.1029/JZ065i005p01513.
- —— (1962). "The Problem of Weather Modification". Science. 138 (3538): 407–412. Bibcode:1962Sci...138..407W. doi:10.1126/science.138.3538.407. PMID 17794913.
- Kitagawa, N.; Brook, M.; —— (1962). "Continuing currents in cloud-to-ground lightning discharges". Journal of Geophysical Research. 67 (2): 637–647. Bibcode:1962JGR....67..637K. doi:10.1029/JZ067i002p00637.
- Brook, M.; Kitagawa, N.; —— (1962). "Quantitative study of strokes and continuing currents in lightning discharges to ground". Journal of Geophysical Research. 67 (2): 649–659. Bibcode:1962JGR....67..649B. doi:10.1029/JZ067i002p00649.
- —— (1967). "The production of thunderstorm electricity". Journal of the Franklin Institute. 283 (6): 540–557. doi:10.1016/0016-0032(67)90600-X.
