= Stirling Colgate =

American nuclear physicist (1925–2013)

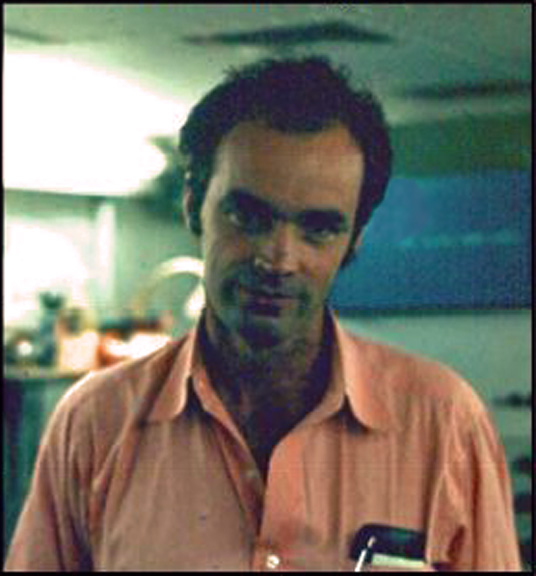
- Stirling Colgate in 1973
- Born: November 14, 1925; New York City, New York, U.S.
- Died: December 1, 2013 (aged 88); Los Alamos, New Mexico, U.S.
- Education: Cornell University; University of California, Berkeley
- Known for: Thermonuclear weapon
- Awards: Bruno Rossi Prize (1990)
- Scientific career
- Fields: Nuclear physics
- Workplaces: Lawrence Livermore National Laboratory; Los Alamos National Laboratory; New Mexico Institute of Mining and Technology

Stirling Auchincloss Colgate (/ˈkoʊlɡeɪt/; November 14, 1925 – December 1, 2013) was an American nuclear physicist at the Los Alamos National Laboratory and a professor emeritus of physics at the New Mexico Institute of Mining and Technology from 1965 to 1974, of which he also served its president.

A scion of the Colgate toothpaste family, he was America's premier diagnostics scientist on thermonuclear weapons during the early years at the Lawrence Livermore National Laboratory in California, and later at the Los Alamos National Laboratory (LANL). While much of his involvement with physics remains highly classified, he made many contributions in the open literature, including in physics education and astrophysics, particularly in plasma physics.

== Early life and education ==
Colgate was born in New York City in 1925, to Henry Auchincloss and Jeanette Thurber (née Pruyn) Colgate. He attended Los Alamos Ranch School until 1942 when a military delegation along with input from Robert Oppenheimer and Ernest O. Lawrence decided to close the school. Colgate and others in the class were then graduated with only two months notice. The following year he attended Cornell University to study electrical engineering.

In 1944, Colgate enlisted in the merchant marine. After the atomic bombing of Hiroshima, Japan, the captain of the ship Colgate was serving on called on Colgate to "tell us what it means." At that time what he explained was strictly confidential, most of all the description of nuclear fission.

After being discharged in 1946, Colgate returned to Cornell University, where he completed a Bachelor of Science in 1948 and a PhD in nuclear physics in 1951, then taking up a position as postdoctoral fellow at Berkeley.

== The development of the hydrogen bomb ==
In 1952, he moved to Lawrence Livermore National Laboratory. The laboratory had been recently created by Edward Teller with encouragement from the United States Air Force in order to compete with weapon research at the Los Alamos National Laboratories. For the purposes of developing a hydrogen bomb, Teller assigned Colgate to the diagnostic measurements for their nuclear tests.

Colgate studied the radioactive products of an explosion which were scooped from the atmosphere by specially designed aircraft. His second job was measuring the range of energy of the neutrons and higher frequency gamma rays created by the nuclear tests.

Colgate's work required him to shuffle between Albuquerque, Livermore, and Los Alamos. During one trip to Los Alamos he met Subrahmanyan Chandrasekhar, whom he worked with again almost ten years later.

In the 1950s Colgate was in charge of thousands during the Bravo test, the first deliverable thermonuclear bomb, which akin to his earlier work, included the atmospheric sampling Project Ashcan. Upon the success of the detonation, Teller encouraged Colgate to begin research on thermonuclear fusion and plasma physics.

== Later career ==
Colgate diagnostic measurements regarding the blast yield of the thermouclear fusion made him possible to study physics of plasma. This is a fireball of Castle Bravo of which he was in charge of device design and implementation.

In 1956 Colgate and colleague Montgomery H. Johnson were recruited to investigate the resultant radiation and debris from a hydrogen bomb explosion in space. They realized that the X-ray and gamma-ray emissions of supernovae could also set off satellites designed to detect hydrogen bomb explosions.

Colgate's supernova research during this investigation ignited his interest in astrophysics. Colgate and Johnson's first attempts to understand the mechanism of a supernova began with determining the actual cause of one. They assumed that "a shockwave from the core bounce smashes into nuclear ash plummeting inwards due to the inward tug of gravity". The shock wave would turn this matter around, heating it up, causing the supernova. However, this turned out to be wrong, as Richard H. White used computer simulations to show that the shock wave would not be strong enough to trigger the event. Colgate and White began developing models of stars on the verge of collapse. White wrote a computer program combining software used to design bombs with equations of state for a star. In discussions with a friend, Colgate found that neutrinos can develop degeneracy pressure. This pressure aided the shock wave in blowing off the outer shells of an expiring star, leaving a neutron star behind. While this research helped validate Chandrasekhar's work on limits, neutron stars were still purely hypothetical.

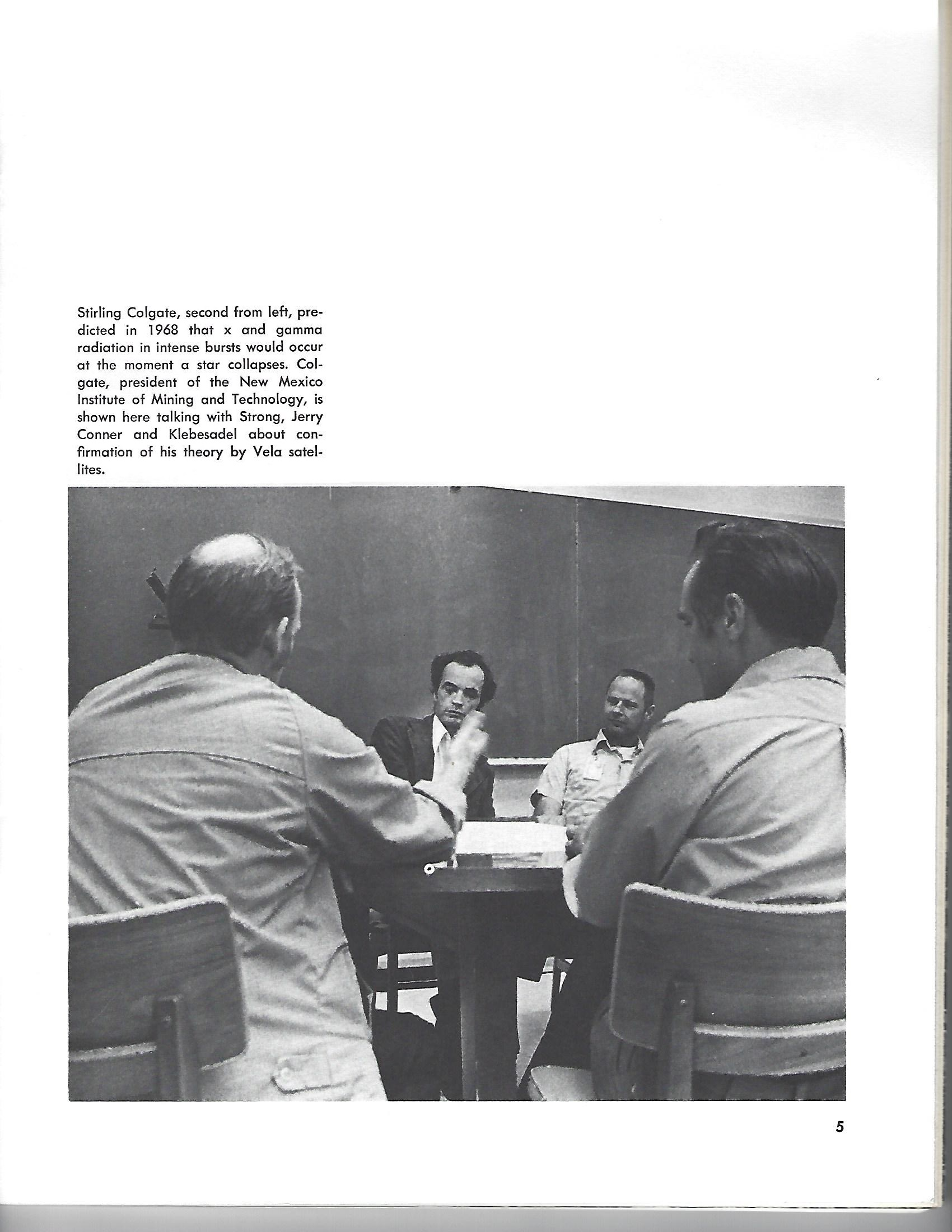
Stirling Colgate taking a part in discussing nuclear weapon effects in 1973 at LANL.

In 1959, upon the advice of Los Alamos and Livermore National Laboratories, the State Department recruited Colgate as the scientific consultant on nuclear test ban negotiations in Geneva. It was here that he proposed the detection of nuclear testing by use of spy satellites, specifically the Vela satellites. However, he also raised the possibility of false alarms caused by supernovae.

Despite encouragement by Teller to follow up on the detonation of the 50-megaton Czar bomb which the Soviet Union had just detonated, Colgate decided to continue his prior research on supernovae.

In 1966 his research with Johnson and White finally emerged in a paper carefully edited by Chandrasekhar.

Colgate went on to serve as the president of New Mexico Tech in Socorro, New Mexico from the beginning of 1965 through the end of 1974. While there he conducted research programs in astrophysics and atmospheric physics as well as leading the college.

Many of his projects had colorful names inspired by the experimental configurations and goals. Some of these included DigAs (a search for early supernova in galaxies with a remote controlled telescope in real time using an IBM 360-44 mainframe computer through a digital microwave link from the New Mexico Tech campus to the school's Langmuir Laboratory) (see the PBS NOVA episode "Death of a Star", 1987, ca. 8 minutes in), Paul Bunyan's Condom (aka PBC—a long plastic tube inflated by a B-26 bomber engine/propeller pumping charged smoke up into a thunderstorm cloud), and SNORT (supernova observational radio telescope—a search for radio frequency chirps caused by the dispersive media between the receiver and the distant supernova).

From 1975 until his death, Colgate worked at the Los Alamos National Laboratory (LANL) and was a professor emeritus at New Mexico Tech. He continued his research into supernova and received the 2006 Los Alamos medal from LANL. Colgate had a specially designed laboratory on the New Mexico Tech campus where he continued his research until mid-2013, when he ceased work due to failing health.

In 1984 Colgate co-founded the Santa Fe Institute.

== Sources ==
- Miller, A. (2005). Empire of Stars. Little, Brown, Great Britain. ISBN 9780618341511.
- Chew, Joe (1987). Storms Above the Desert. Albuquerque: U. of New Mexico.
- Athearn, Frederic J. (Feb 1989). "Review: Storms above the Desert: Atmospheric Research in New Mexico, 1935-1985 and Big Bend on the Rio Grande". The Western Historical Quarterly. 20 (1): 75–77. doi:10.2307/968496. JSTOR 968496. See chapter 6 in particular.
