= Marylynn V. Yates =

American microbiologist

Marylynn V. Yates is an American microbiologist and academic. She is a National Associate of the National Academies and a fellow of the American Association for the Advancement of Science.

== Life ==
She graduated from University of Wisconsin-Madison, New Mexico Institute of Mining and Technology, and University of Arizona. She taught at University of California, Riverside. She was dean of the College of Natural and Agricultural Sciences.

== Works ==
- Wasik, Daniel; Mulchandani, Ashok; Yates, Marylynn V. (2018-08-12). "Salivary Detection of Dengue Virus NS1 Protein with a Label-Free Immunosensor for Early Dengue Diagnosis". Sensors. 18 (8): 2641. doi:10.3390/s18082641. ISSN 1424-8220. PMC 6111667. PMID 30103543.
- Dunams, Daniela; Sarkar, Payal; Chen, Wilfred; Yates, Marylynn V. (2012). "Simultaneous Detection of Infectious Human Echoviruses and Adenoviruses by an In Situ Nuclease-Resistant Molecular Beacon-Based Assay". Applied and Environmental Microbiology. 78 (5): 1584–1588. doi:10.1128/AEM.05937-11. ISSN 0099-2240. PMC 3294457. PMID 22194298.
- Ganguli, Payal S.; Chen, Wilfred; Yates, Marylynn V. (2011). "Detection of Murine Norovirus-1 by Using TAT Peptide-Delivered Molecular Beacons". Applied and Environmental Microbiology. 77 (15): 5517–5520. doi:10.1128/AEM.03048-10. ISSN 0099-2240. PMC 3147468. PMID 21652740.
