= Southwest Border Security Consortium =

The Southwest Border Security Consortium (SBSC) is a joint venture of nine U.S. universities in the states of Arizona, California, New Mexico and Texas to develop and promote scientific and policy solutions to issues facing the United States-Mexico border region.

Southwest Border Security Consortium

The SBSC is also addressing border issues by offering a comprehensive, multi-institutional set of capabilities to relevant agencies such as the federal departments of Homeland Security, Defense, Energy and Transportation.

== Members ==
=== Arizona ===
- Arizona State University
- University of Arizona

=== California ===
- San Diego State University

=== New Mexico ===
- New Mexico State University
- New Mexico Institute of Mining and Technology (New Mexico Tech)
- University of New Mexico

=== Texas ===
- Texas A&M University
- University of Texas at El Paso (UTEP)
- University of Texas at San Antonio

== See also ==
- United States-Mexico border
- Border
- Border control
