= Nguene =

Nguene is a Cameroonian surname. Notable people with the surname include:

- Pauline Irene Nguene (born 1958), Cameroonian politician
- Bernard Nguene (born 2006), Cameroonian footballer
