= Energetic Materials Research and Testing Center =

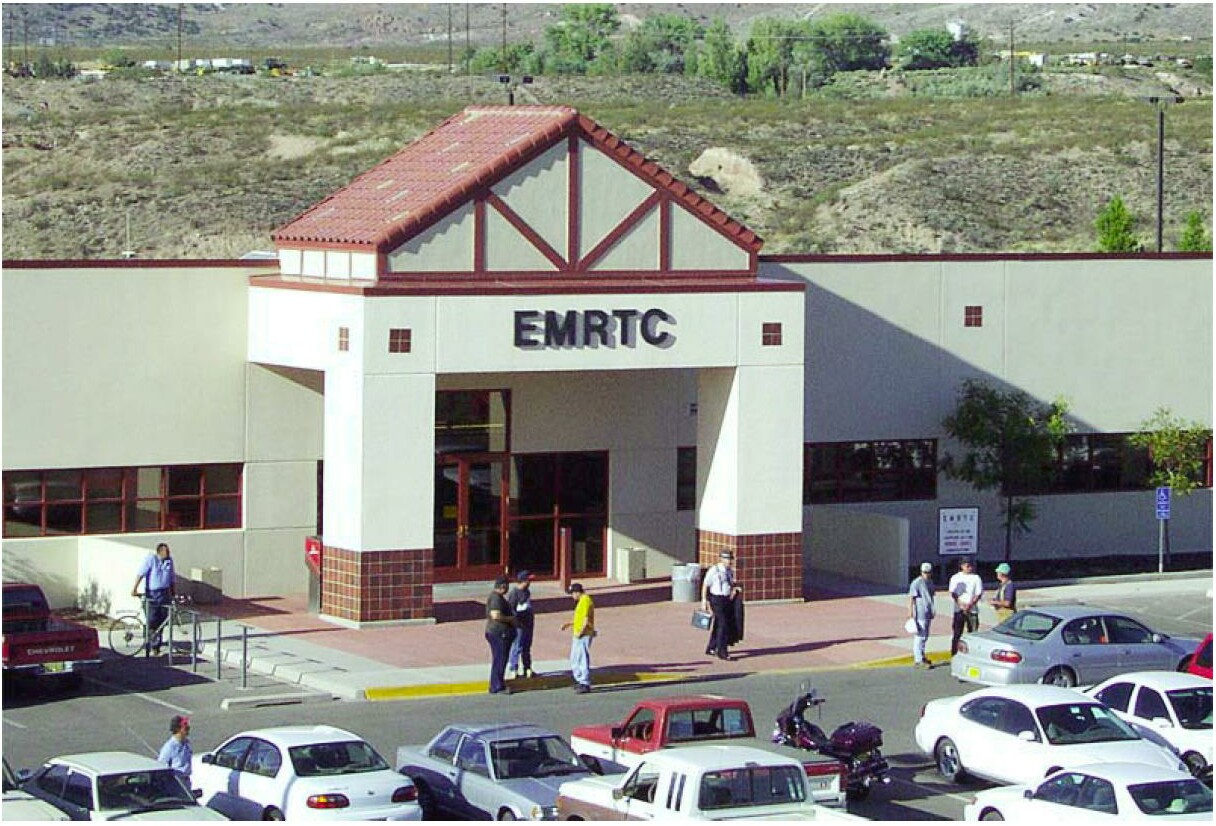
EMRTC headquarters, NM Tech campus, Socorro, NM

The Energetic Materials Research and Testing Center (EMRTC) is a research division of New Mexico Tech, which performs testing of high explosives, bombs, and other munitions, as well as the means to deliver such munitions. It also offers courses for emergency responders in bomb response. EMRTC's offices are in Socorro, New Mexico. The 40-square-mile (100 km^{2}) field testing and training areas are located west of town in Socorro County and they have an anti-terrorist training site in Playas, New Mexico, in Hidalgo County.

== History ==
EMRTC was founded in 1946 by E.J. Workman, who moved the center to New Mexico Tech (then called the New Mexico School of Mines) from the New Mexico Experimental Range in Albuquerque, New Mexico. EMRTC was granted access to public land for their testing; the land is near "M Mountain" in Socorro, New Mexico. EMRTC also provides training to US and "friendly foreign governments" in counter-terrorism and explosive handling.

== Citizen concerns ==
A few citizens of Socorro, New Mexico have mixed feelings about the presence of EMRTC.

On the one hand, businesses appreciate the high wage jobs associated with the institute as well as the out of town visitors that it brings in for training, many of whom stay for days or weeks at a time and infuse the local economy with their purchases.

On the other hand, many local residents who do not own businesses express frustration with the noise problems associated with testing explosives and bombs. In fact, EMRTC is known by many townspeople of Socorro as "the guys who rattle their windows" almost daily. The explosions typically occur in the late morning or early and mid-afternoon and can be heard - and felt - all over town.

EMRTC has recently been embroiled in controversy for a proposed "drop zone" which will involve training aircraft in dropping cargo, personnel, and eventually air-to-ground gunnery. This has been a heated topic at recent Socorro city council meetings, with many residents opposed but a vocal minority strongly supporting it. Proponents of the proposed drop zone suggest it will not impact Socorro residents negatively and will help the US military in essential training missions. Opponents of the proposed drop zone complain that the noise impacts may affect city and county residents and that the training site is not needed by the U.S. Air Force, which has other nearby drop zones available for training.
