= Mahyar Amouzegar =

Mahyar A. Amouzegar

18th President of New Mexico Tech
- In office April 15, 2024 – July 25, 2025
- Preceded by: Stephen G. Wells; Daniel H. Lopez (interim)
- Succeeded by: Michael Jackson (interim)

Personal details
- Born: Orumieh, Iran
- Education: Bachelor of Science in Applied Mathematics; Master of Science in Electrical Engineering; Doctor of Philosophy in Operations Research
- Alma mater: San Francisco State University; University of California, Los Angeles
- Occupation: Mathematician, engineer, policy analyst, author and academic
- Website: https://www.amouzegar.com/
- Scientific career
- Fields: Operations Research
- Workplaces: New Mexico Institute of Mining and Technology (New Mexico Tech); RAND Corporation; The University of New Orleans; Cal Poly Pomona
- Thesis: Nonlinear bilevel programming: Analysis and application to regional hazardous waste management (1995)

Mahyar A. Amouzegar is an Iranian-American mathematician, engineer, policy analyst, author, and academic. He became the 18th President of New Mexico Tech on April 15, 2024; he resigned on July 25, 2025.

Amouzegar research encompasses modeling and simulation, optimization, logistics and supply chain management, organizational studies and national security policy analysis.

Amouzegar is a Fellow of the Institute of Mathematics and Its Applications, and Institute of Combinatorics and Its Applications. He served as editor-in-chief for the Journal of Applied Mathematics and Decision Sciences and is an Associate Editor for the International Journal of Applied Decision Sciences.

== Early life ==
Born in Iran to a bookkeeper, Amouzegar grew up surrounded by literature. Each night, his father brought home a new book from the publishing house where he worked, filling their home with a variety of works. At age fourteen, in 1978, he left Tehran to live with his older sisters in San Francisco. Due to the political unrest leading to the Iranian Revolution, his parents were unable to join him in the United States for over five years. During this period, he developed a writing habit, balancing his interest in literature with his aptitude for math.

== Education ==
Amouzegar pursued his higher education, earning a Bachelor of Science in Applied Mathematics from San Francisco State University in 1983. He then proceeded to obtain a Master of Science in Electrical Engineering at the University of California, Los Angeles (UCLA) in 1989, concurrently completing an Engineering Degree. During his master's studies, he focused on operations research to address policy issues later completing his doctoral studies in Operations Research at UCLA, with a specialization in Nonconvex Optimization.

== Career ==
After obtaining his PhD, Amouzegar began his career as an Assistant Professor (Lecturer) at Massey University in 1995, teaching operations research and developing models and algorithms for nonconvex optimization problems. He then moved to California State University, Long Beach, serving as Associate Dean for Research and Graduate Studies from 2005 to 2011. From 2003 to 2006, he was a Senior Honorary Visiting Fellow at Cass Business School, City University of London, and later served as President of the Western Decision Sciences Institute. Afterward, he was the Dean of Engineering and Professor of Systems Engineering at California State Polytechnic University-Pomona from 2011 to 2017. Concurrently, he was a Senior National Security Policy Analyst for the RAND Corporation from 1998 to 2023. At the University of New Orleans, he served as Provost and Senior Vice President for Academic Affairs from 2017 to 2024. He was appointed by the Governor to the Louisiana STEM Council in 2017 and served as the Freeport McMoRan Distinguished Professor.

Since 2019, Amouzegar has held the Hancock-Whitney Distinguished Professorship of Finance while also serving as vice president for International Relations at Alpha Iota Delta and as a member of the Jefferson Chamber Education and Workforce Development Committee. In 2024, he became President of the New Mexico Institute of Mining and Technology.

== Creative writing ==
Amouzegar's writing is influenced by his love of old movies, particularly 1940s screwball comedies and film noir, as well as novels like The Godfather. He developed an appreciation for Ernest Hemingway and Graham Greene, often writing to the music of operas like “Aida”. His first two novels, A Dark Sunny Afternoon and Pisgah Road, explored the lives of two men navigating past love and drama. Kirkus Reviews described "Pisgah Road" saying the "plot sing with nostalgia and regret, beautifully capturing the narrator's struggles with his own vulnerability. The author's touch is light as his characters deny their feelings, to themselves and to one another, until the right circumstances finally allow them to speak… A capable portrait of grief, longing, and second chances." Among other works, he delved into the complexities of intimate human relationships through the reminiscences of protagonist Donte, offering an exploration of how personal history shapes identity in Dinner At 10:32. His 2021 novel The Hubris of an Empty Hand presented eight stories on the themes of love, sacrifice, and the desire for remembrance and recognition, receiving numerous reviews. In 2026, Amouzegar co-authored the speculative science-fiction novel Tomorrow Brings Joy: Elysium, a work exploring themes of memory, identity, and post-scarcity society, which was reviewed by Kirkus Reviews and Publishers Weekly. Kirkus Reviews described the novel as “a provocative and philosophical exploration of humanity in a fragile future.”

== Research ==
Amouzegar's research has centered on optimization techniques and their application in solving complex problems across various domains, ranging from environmental management to military logistics and policy analysis.

=== Bilevel optimization ===
Amouzegar has conducted research on linear bilevel programming and environmental optimization offering methodologies and strategic decision models. He introduced a method for generating test problems for linear bilevel programming, systematically selecting a distant vertex from the solution of the relaxed linear programming problem. His collaboration with Khosrow Moshirvaziri led to the development of two optimization models for hazardous waste capacity planning and treatment facility locations. Building upon this, he addressed environmental challenges through bilevel programming, particularly focusing on the solid waste management deficit in California's San Francisco Bay Area.

=== Efficiency in combat and air support ===
Amouzegar's research efforts have provided insights into the development of agile combat support systems. While examining Agile Combat Support (ACS) and mobility system design and evaluation, he alongside other researchers addressed trade-offs, resource requirements, and support options across scenarios, to establish a robust planning framework for future ACS. He then used an optimization model to evaluate different global forward support location (FSL) options for storing war reserve materiel, balancing land and sea-based FSLs to minimize peacetime costs while ensuring sufficient support for training. In related research, his publication, "Evaluation of Options for Overseas Combat Support Basing," presented an analytic framework and model for assessing overseas combat support basing options to ensure swift and efficient support for US forces in diverse deployment scenarios. He was also part of a 2015 technical report at the Rand Corporation which delved into the challenges faced by the US Air Force in maintaining secure air bases in the Pacific region due to potential threats from near-peer powers highlighting significant impacts on combat support and logistics requirements.

== Awards and honors ==
- 1998 – Fellow, Institute of Combinatorics and Its Applications
- 2000 – Fellow, Institute of Mathematics and Its Applications

== Bibliography ==
=== Selected articles ===
- Amouzegar, M. A. (1999). "A global optimization method for nonlinear bilevel programming problems". IEEE Transactions on Systems, Man, and Cybernetics, Part B (Cybernetics). 29 (6): 771–777. doi:10.1109/3477.809031. PMID 18252356.
- Amouzegar, M. A.; Moshirvaziri, K. (2001). "Strategic management decision support system: An analysis of the environmental policy issues". Environmental Modeling & Assessment. 6: 297–306. doi:10.1023/A:1013398219772.
- Amouzegar, M.; Drew, J.; Tripp, R. S. (2010). "A simulation model for the analysis of end-to-end support of unmanned aerial vehicles". International Journal of Applied Decision Sciences. 3 (2). doi:10.1504/IJADS.2010.036101.
- Moshirvaziri, K.; Amouzegar, M. A. (2011). "A deep cutting plane technique for reverse convex optimization". IEEE Transactions on Systems, Man, and Cybernetics, Part B (Cybernetics). 41 (4): 2011. doi:10.1109/TSMCB.2011.2105265. PMID 21296710.
- Amouzegar, M. A. (2018). "Defence Practice: Military Logistics". In Galbreath, D. J.; Deni, J. (eds.). Routledge Handbook of Defence Studies. U.K.: Taylor & Francis Group Publishing. doi:10.4324/9781315650463. ISBN 9781315650463. OCLC 1019725895.
- Bodine-Baron, E.; Snyder, D.; Amouzegar, M. A. (2019). Cyber mission thread analysis, a prototype framework for assessing impact to missions from cyber attacks to weapon systems (Report). Rand. OCLC 1019725895.

=== Selected books (fiction) ===
- — (2016). A Dark Sunny Afternoon. Fountain Blue Publishing. ISBN 978-1628681611. OCLC 976413021.
- — (2017). Pisgah Road. Fountain Blue Publishing. ISBN 978-1628682069. OCLC 1014283391.
- — (2020). Dinner at 10:32. University of New Orleans Press. ISBN 978-1608011810. OCLC 1130047145.
- — (2021). The Hubris of an Empty Hand. University of New Orleans Press. ISBN 978-1608012213. OCLC 1313401878.
- — (2026). Tomorrow Brings Joy: Elysium. University of New Orleans Press. ISBN 978-1608013043. OCLC 1557606131.
