= South Baldy (New Mexico) =

Peak in central New Mexico

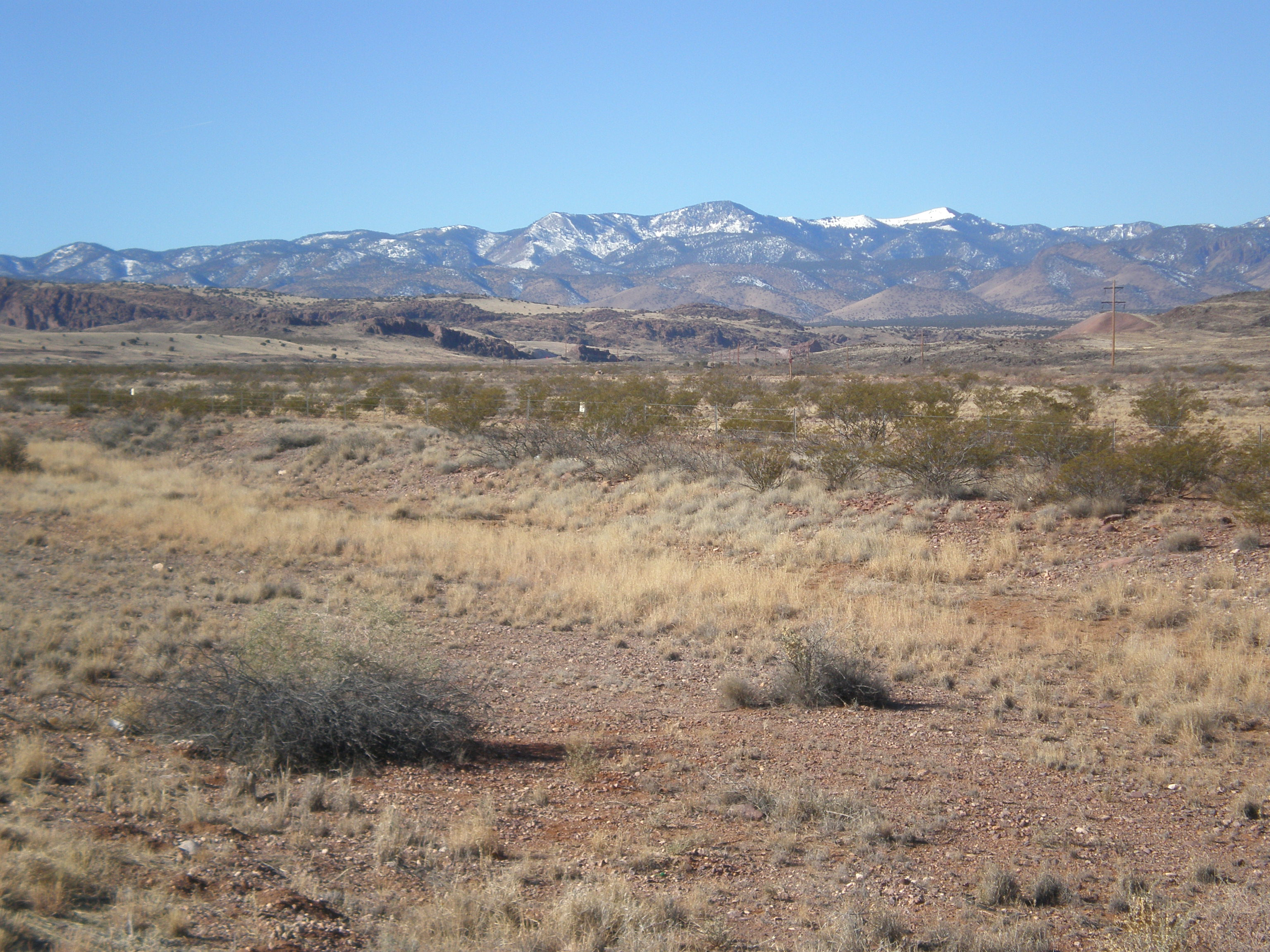
- South Baldy is the snowcapped mountain peak seen in the distance to right center

Highest point
- Elevation: 10,789 ft (3,288 m) NAVD 88
- Prominence: 3,803 ft (1,159 m)
- Coordinates: 33°59′28″N 107°11′16″W

Geography
- Location within New Mexico
- Location: Socorro County, New Mexico, U.S.
- Parent range: Magdalena Mountains
- Topo map: USGS South Baldy (NM)

Climbing
- Easiest route: road

South Baldy is the highest point of the Magdalena Mountains in central New Mexico, in the United States. It is in the Magdalena Ranger District of the Cibola National Forest, about 9 mi (15 km) south of Magdalena and 18 mi (30 km) west-southwest of Socorro. It lies just north of the Langmuir Laboratory for Atmospheric Research of the New Mexico Institute of Mining and Technology, and site of the Magdalena Ridge Observatory Interferometer.

South Baldy can be accessed easily from the dirt road leading to Langmuir. Alternately, it can be accessed by trail from below. From a campground in Water Canyon (accessed from the northeast side of the range), a trail follows Forest Road 406 and then Trail 10 up Copper Canyon to the main crest of the range, where it joins Trail 8, the North Baldy Trail, which follows the crest. A short hike south on this trail and a little off-trail ascent leads to the summit of South Baldy.

The peak is the site of an annual mountain bike ascent race up the Langmuir Road as part of the Tour of Socorro.

While not of exceptional height for New Mexico mountains, South Baldy is surrounded by low terrain, and hence is a highly visible landmark and the sixth most topographically prominent peak in the state.

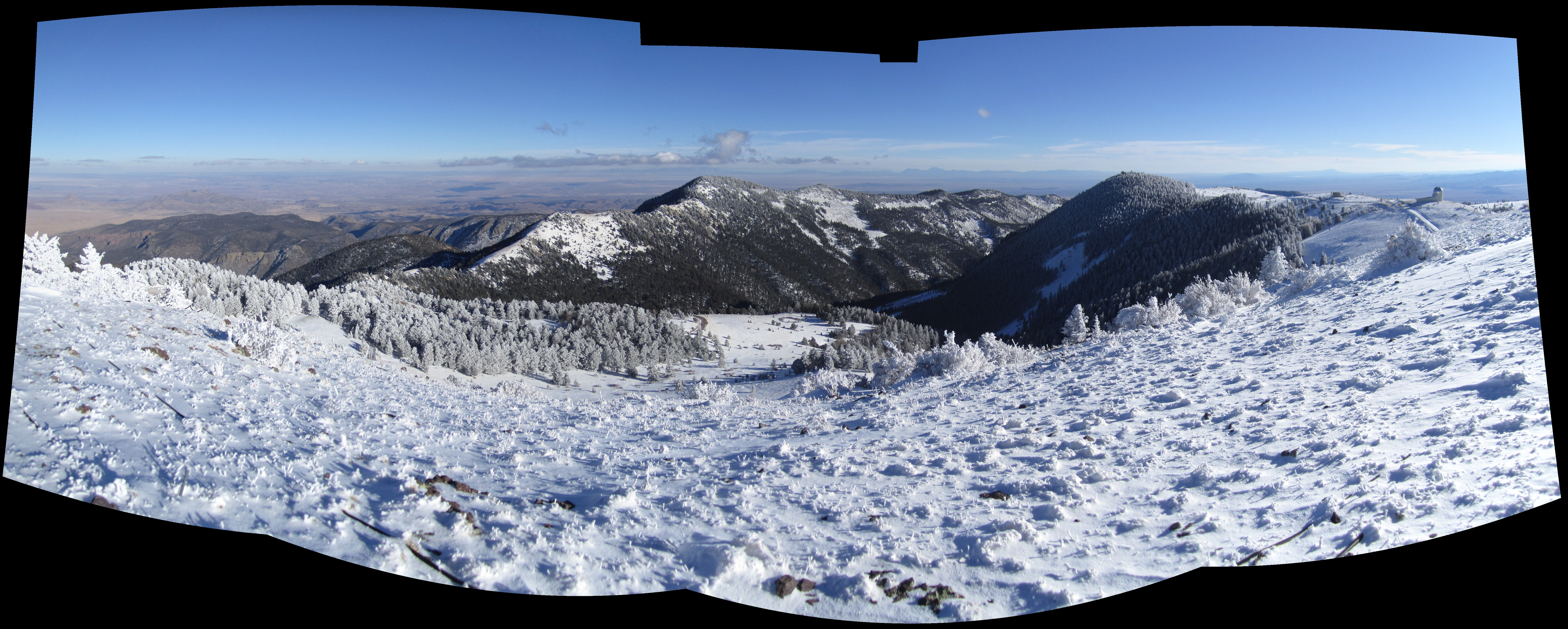
The eastern view from the summit of South Baldy.

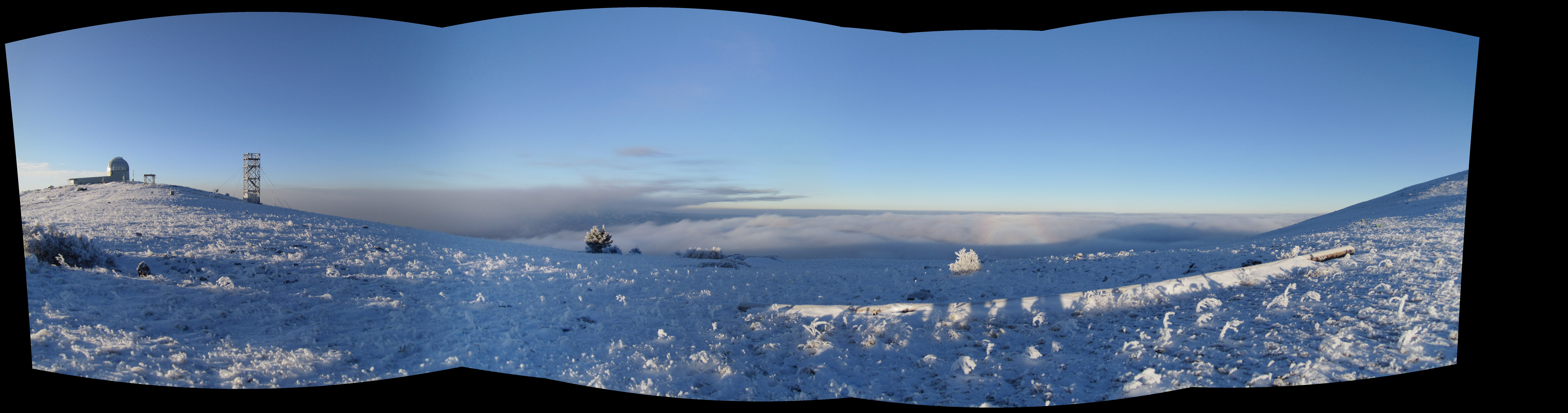
The western view from the summit of South Baldy.
