= List of Nova episodes (seasons 1–20) =

Nova is an American science documentary television series produced by WGBH Boston for PBS. Several episodes in this list were not originally produced for PBS, but were acquired from other sources such as the BBC. Most episodes are 60-minutes long.

== Episodes ==
=== Season 1: 1974 ===
No. overall	No. in season	Title	Original release date	Prod. code
1	1	"The Making of a Natural History Film"	March 3, 1974	0101
Please add a Plot Summary here and in the episodes below, replacing this text. For guidance, see How to write a plot summary. Episode summaries must be expressed in your own words. Do NOT submit content you find from another web site as it is plagiarism and likely a copyright violation, which Wikipedia cannot accept and will be removed or reverted. Superficially modifying copyrighted content or closely paraphrasing it, even if the source is cited, still constitutes a copyright violation. As per the Television Plot Manual of Style, summaries should be about 100 to 200 words in length, and those substantially less than 100 words are most likely to be scrutinized for possible copyright violation. Note: Re-narrated Horizon episode, first aired in the UK in 1972.
2	2	"Where Did the Colorado Go?"	March 10, 1974	0102
3	3	"Whales, Dolphins, and Men"	March 17, 1974	0103
4	4	"The Search for Life"	March 24, 1974	0104
5	5	"Last of the Cuiva"	March 31, 1974	0105
6	6	"Strange Sleep"	April 7, 1974	0106
7	7	"The Crab Nebula"	April 14, 1974	0107
8	8	"Bird Brain: The Mystery of Bird Navigation"	April 21, 1974	0108
9	9	"Are You Doing This for Me, Doctor?"	April 28, 1974	0109
10	10	"The First Signs of Washoe"	May 5, 1974	0110
11	11	"The Case of the Midwife Toad"	May 12, 1974	0111
12	12	"Fusion: The Energy Promise"	May 19, 1974	0112
Controlled nuclear fusion means taming the hydrogen bomb. It could solve the world's energy shortage but it is an enormous engineering challenge. NOVA looks at the latest fusion machines in the UK and USA. Narrated by David Rose.
13	13	"The Mystery of the Anasazi"	May 26, 1974	0113
The Anasazi population inhabited the American Southwest 4 corners region (Colorado, New Mexico, Utah and Arizona) for multiple centuries, and they are believed to be descendants of an earlier culture present in the area. This show covers research being done at several 4 corners sites, such as Chaco Canyon, Canyon de Chelly and Mesa Verde. Explanations of the original use of the sites using contemporary knowledge are discussed, as is speculation made as to when and why these areas were eventually abandoned, and where the people may have resettled. Food sources are discussed as is the possible effect of man's influence on the land itself. Site dates using tree ring data is presented, along with an explanation as to how this science works. Note that the website location for this episode has 2 video versions presented. Both are the same except the second includes a short presentation on the making of stone tools as used by the original inhabitants of this region.

=== Season 2: 1974–75 ===
No. overall	No. in season	Title	Original release date	Prod. code
14	1	"Why Do Birds Sing?"	November 3, 1974	0201
Please add a Plot Summary here and in the episodes below, replacing this text. For guidance, see How to write a plot summary. Episode summaries must be expressed in your own words. Do NOT submit content you find from another web site as it is plagiarism and likely a copyright violation, which Wikipedia cannot accept and will be removed or reverted. Superficially modifying copyrighted content or closely paraphrasing it, even if the source is cited, still constitutes a copyright violation. As per the Television Plot Manual of Style, summaries should be about 100 to 200 words in length, and those substantially less than 100 words are most likely to be scrutinized for possible copyright violation.
15	2	"How Much Do You Smell?"	November 10, 1974	0202
16	3	"The Hunting of the Quark"	November 17, 1974	0203
17	4	"The Secrets of Sleep"	November 24, 1974	0204
18	5	"Inside the Golden Gate"	December 1, 1974	0205
NOVA joins scientists from different fields as they study the ecosystem of the estuary known as the San Francisco Bay, and man's effects on that ecosystem.
19	6	"The Men Who Painted Caves"	December 8, 1974	0206
20	7	"Red Sea Coral"	December 15, 1974	0207
21	8	"War From the Air"	January 5, 1975	0208
Using historical and propaganda footage, NOVA traces the history of the usage of airplanes in warfare; beginning from movies that depict the possibility of pilots dropping bombs using airplanes to the development of nuclear weapons in the 1970s.
22	9	"What Time is Your Body?"	January 12, 1975	0209
Scientists study the circadian body rhythms of plants and animals on Earth. Knowing man's circadian rhythms may help us perform better at work and lead healthier lives.
23	10	"The Rise and Fall of DDT"	January 19, 1975	0210
NOVA traces the rise in popularity of the insecticide after helping WWII soldiers avoid disease to its ban in the US after scientists rose the alarm of its effect on animals' reproduction rates.
24	11	"Take the World From Another Point of View"	February 2, 1975	0211
NOVA asks famed Nobel prize winning physicist Richard Feynman how he thinks and who he wants to have conversations with.
25	12	"The Lysenko Affair"	February 9, 1975	0212
NOVA talks about the rise and fall of Trofim Lysenko, a Soviet biologist who used his political influence to push pseudoscientific ideas in agronomy that caused prolonged food shortages in the Soviet Union.
26	13	"The Tuaregs"	February 16, 1975	0213
27	14	"The Plutonium Connection"	March 9, 1975	0214
With information into making a small nuclear bomb readily obtainable, NOVA determines whether nuclear reprocessing plants are capable of preventing the theft or robbery of plutonium.
28	15	"The Other Way"	March 16, 1975	0215
As the price of fuel continues to rise, Ernst Friedrich "Fritz" Schumacher promotes intermediate technology to help small-scale businesses and less industrialized countries increase productivity and labor opportunities. NOVA asks Schumacher to explain his solution to increase productivity, while requiring less energy consumption. First aired on Horizon on November 11, 1974.
29	16	"The Lost World of the Maya"	March 30, 1975	0216
Dr. Eric Thompson guides Magnus Magnusson around various Mayan sites and their meanings. First broadcast in BBC Chronicle, October 6, 1972.
30	17	"Will The Fishing Have to Stop?"	April 6, 1975	0217

=== Season 3: 1976 ===
No. overall	No. in season	Title	Original release date	Prod. code
31	1	"Predictable Disaster"	January 4, 1976	0301
Please add a Plot Summary here and in the episodes, replacing this text. For guidance, see How to write a plot summary. Episode summaries must be expressed in your own words. Do NOT submit content you find from another web site as it is plagiarism and likely a copyright violation, which Wikipedia cannot accept and will be removed or reverted. Superficially modifying copyrighted content or closely paraphrasing it, even if the source is cited, still constitutes a copyright violation. As per the Television Plot Manual of Style, summaries should be about 100 to 200 words in length, and those substantially less than 100 words are most likely to be scrutinized for possible copyright violation.
32	2	"Joey"	January 11, 1976	0302
Please add a Plot Summary here, as per WP:PLOTSUM & MOS:TVPLOT. Note: First aired in Horizon on December 9, 1974.
33	3	"Meditation and the Mind"	January 18, 1976	0303
34	4	"The Planets"	January 25, 1976	0304
Please add a Plot Summary here, as per WP:PLOTSUM & MOS:TVPLOT. Note: Narrated by Paul Vaughan. Originally aired in Horizon on March 10, 1975.
35	5	"A Desert Place"	February 1, 1976	0305
Please add a Plot Summary here, as per WP:PLOTSUM & MOS:TVPLOT. Note: Narrated by Robert Dryden.
36	6	"A Small Imperfection"	February 8, 1976	0306
37	7	"Ninety Degrees Below"	February 15, 1976	0307
38	8	"The Race for the Double Helix"	March 7, 1976	0308
39	9	"The Renewable Tree"	March 7, 1976	0309
Paper mill business began planting trees in the early 20th Century after logging wiped out the forests in the Southern United States. This practice has continued, but is the tree a truly renewable resource? NOVA examines the effect of clear-cutting and reforestation efforts to determine if we will eventually run out of trees for wood products. Narrated by Glenn Kezer.
40	10	"The Williamsburg File"	March 14, 1976	0310
41	11	"The Overworked Miracle"	March 21, 1976	0311
42	12	"The Transplant Experience"	April 11, 1976	0312
43	13	"The Underground Movement"	April 18, 1976	0313
44	14	"Hunters of the Seal"	May 2, 1976	0314
In 1967, the Canadian Government gave housing to the Netsilik Inuit for them to settle in and give up their nomadic lifestyle. 10 years later, some of them have returned to their old ways. NOVA shows how the elders preserve and teach their culture to the next generation while attempting to protect their ancestral lands from industrialization. Narrated by Mercedes McCambridge.
45	15	"Benjamin"	May 9, 1976	0315
46	16	"The Women Rebel"	May 23, 1976	0316
47	17	"Death of a Disease"	June 6, 1976	0317
48	18	"Inside the Shark"	June 13, 1976	0318
49	19	"The Genetic Chance"	June 20, 1976	0319
50	20	"The Case of the Bermuda Triangle"	June 27, 1976	0320
Please add a Plot Summary here, as per WP:PLOTSUM & MOS:TVPLOT. Note: Narrated by David Palmer. First aired on Horizon on February 16, 1976.

=== Season 4: 1977 ===
No. overall	No. in season	Title	Original release date	Prod. code
51	1	"Hitler's Secret Weapon"	January 5, 1977	0401
Wernher von Braun and others recount the development of the V-2 rocket, the first long-range, guided ballistic missile. Narrated by Richard Kiley.
52	2	"The Hot Blooded Dinosaurs"	January 12, 1977	0402
Please add a Plot Summary here and in the episodes below, replacing this text. For guidance, see How to write a plot summary. Episode summaries must be expressed in your own words. Do NOT submit content you find from another web site as it is plagiarism and likely a copyright violation, which Wikipedia cannot accept and will be removed or reverted. Superficially modifying copyrighted content or closely paraphrasing it, even if the source is cited, still constitutes a copyright violation. As per the Television Plot Manual of Style, summaries should be about 100 to 200 words in length, and those substantially less than 100 words are most likely to be scrutinized for possible copyright violation.
53	3	"What Price Coal?"	January 19, 1977	0403
54	4	"The Sunspot Mystery"	February 2, 1977	0404
55	5	"The Plastic Prison"	February 9, 1977	0405
56	6	"Incident at Brown's Ferry"	February 23, 1977	0406
57	7	"Bye Bye Blackbird"	March 2, 1977	0407
58	8	"The Pill for the People"	March 9, 1977	0408
59	9	"The Gene Engineers"	March 16, 1977	0409
60	10	"The Human Animal"	March 23, 1977	0410
61	11	"The Wolf Equation"	March 30, 1977	0411
62	12	"The Dawn of the Solar Age"	April 20, 1977	0412
63	13	"The Business of Extinction"	April 20, 1977	0413
64	14	"The Red Planet"	April 27, 1977	0414
65	15	"Tongues of Men: Disaster at Babel" (1 of 2)	May 11, 1977	0415
66	16	"Tongues of Men: A World Language?" (2 of 2)	May 18, 1977	0416
67	17	"Linus Pauling: Crusading Scientist"	June 1, 1977	0417
68	18	"Across the Silent Barrier"	June 22, 1977	0418
69	19	"The New Healers"	June 29, 1977	0419

=== Season 5: 1978 ===
No. overall	No. in season	Title	Original release date	Prod. code
70	1	"In The Event of Catastrophe"	January 4, 1978	0501
Please add a Plot Summary here and in the episodes below, replacing this text. For guidance, see How to write a plot summary. Episode summaries must be expressed in your own words. Do NOT submit content you find from another web site as it is plagiarism and likely a copyright violation, which Wikipedia cannot accept and will be removed or reverted. Superficially modifying copyrighted content or closely paraphrasing it, even if the source is cited, still constitutes a copyright violation. As per the Television Plot Manual of Style, summaries should be about 100 to 200 words in length, and those substantially less than 100 words are most likely to be scrutinized for possible copyright violation.
71	2	"The Green Machine"	January 11, 1978	0420
Botany is a neglected science and plants are all around us, but unfamiliar. NOVA examines our state of knowledge of how plants work: growth hormones, responses to light and shade, photosynthesis, root mechanisms and twining responses. Note: A BBC-TV production in association with WGBH, Boston for Horizon.
72	3	"Blueprints in the Bloodstream"	January 18, 1978	0502
73	4	"One Small Step"	January 25, 1978	0503
74	5	"The Final Frontier"	February 1, 1978	0504
75	6	"BaMiki BaNdula: Children of the Forest"	February 15, 1978	0505
76	7	"Trial of Denton Cooley"	February 22, 1978	0506
77	8	"The Great Wine Revolution"	March 1, 1978	0507
78	9	"The Case of the Ancient Astronauts"	March 8, 1978	0508
79	10	"The Mind Machines"	March 22, 1978	0509
80	11	"Icarus' Children"	March 29, 1978	0510
81	12	"Still Waters"	April 12, 1978	0511
82	13	"Battle for the Acropolis"	April 19, 1978	0512
83	14	"The Road to Happiness"	May 3, 1978	0513
84	15	"Light of the 21st Century"	May 10, 1978	0514
85	16	"The Insect Alternative"	May 24, 1978	0515
86	17	"The Desert's Edge"	May 31, 1978	0516
87	18	"The Tsetse Trap"	June 7, 1978	0517
88	19	"Memories From Eden"	June 14, 1978	0518
89	20	"A Whisper From Space"	June 21, 1978	0519
90	21	"Alaska: The Closing Frontier"	June 28, 1978	0520

=== Season 6: 1979 ===
No. overall	No. in season	Title	Original release date	Prod. code
91	1	"Black Tide"	January 4, 1979	0601
Please add a Plot Summary here and in the episodes below, replacing this text. For guidance, see How to write a plot summary. Episode summaries must be expressed in your own words. Do NOT submit content you find from another web site as it is plagiarism and likely a copyright violation, which Wikipedia cannot accept and will be removed or reverted. Superficially modifying copyrighted content or closely paraphrasing it, even if the source is cited, still constitutes a copyright violation. As per the Television Plot Manual of Style, summaries should be about 100 to 200 words in length, and those substantially less than 100 words are most likely to be scrutinized for possible copyright violation.
92	2	"Long Walk of Fred Young"	January 11, 1979	0602
93	3	"A World of Difference"	January 18, 1979	0603
94	4	"Cashing In On The Ocean"	February 1, 1979	0604
95	5	"Patterns from the Past"	February 8, 1979	0605
96	6	"The Invisible Flame"	February 22, 1979	0606
97	7	"The End of the Rainbow"	March 1, 1979	0607
98	8	"The Beersheva Experiment"	March 8, 1979	0608
99	9	"Einstein"	March 15, 1979	0609
100	10	"The Keys of Paradise"	March 29, 1979	0610

=== Season 7: 1979–1980 ===
No. overall	No. in season	Title	Original release date	Prod. code
101	1	"A Plague on our Children"	October 2, 1979	0611
Please add a Plot Summary here and in the episodes below, replacing this text. For guidance, see How to write a plot summary. Episode summaries must be expressed in your own words. Do NOT submit content you find from another web site as it is plagiarism and likely a copyright violation, which Wikipedia cannot accept and will be removed or reverted. Superficially modifying copyrighted content or closely paraphrasing it, even if the source is cited, still constitutes a copyright violation. As per the Television Plot Manual of Style, summaries should be about 100 to 200 words in length, and those substantially less than 100 words are most likely to be scrutinized for possible copyright violation.
102	2	"Life on a Silken Thread"	October 9, 1979	0612
103	3	"Sweet Solutions"	October 16, 1979	0613
104	4	"Race For Gold"	October 30, 1979	0614
105	5	"All Part of The Game"	November 6, 1979	0615
106	6	"India: Machinery of Hope"	November 20, 1979	0616
107	7	"The Bridge That Spanned The World"	December 4, 1979	0617
The industrial revolution utilized new materials and processes that expanded technology to the world. An important part of this was the mass scale use of cast iron. To allow this to happen, much development of the means to process it into an economical material were needed, including the fuel to melt it, the methods to cast it, refinement of the raw material itself, transporting it from the locations of mining to processing, and then to cast it. These developments lead to the building of the worlds first metal bridge in 1781, which is discussed and shown in detail. This new field created employment opportunities for many, both skilled and unskilled, but also brought negative aspects as well. The creation of this new industry was led by strong, clever and resourceful personalities, many of whom created family dynasties that lasted for generations, until changes led by competition and dwindling resources forced these to fall away. This show, narrated by Andrew MacMillan (1931-2016) covers the creation of the iron industry in England, and the development of its successor in the USA.
108	8	"Termites and Telescopes"	December 11, 1979	0618
109	9	"Blindness: Five Points of View"	December 18, 1979	0619
110	10	"The Elusive Illness"	January 15, 1980	0701
111	11	"A is for Atom, B is for Bomb"	January 22, 1980	0702
112	12	"Living Machines"	February 5, 1980	0703
113	13	"Portrait of a Killer"	February 19, 1980	0704
114	14	"Umealit: The Whale Hunters"	March 4, 1980	0705
115	15	"The Safety Factor"	March 11, 1980	0706
This episode is concerned with the flight safety of commercial airliners. A commercial flight crossing the Atlantic from the UK to USA is followed from preflight/planning thru to eventual landing to provide the backdrop for many safety related issues. Many technical topics are addressed, including pilot training in simulators to replicate emergency procedures, the cost ramifications of potential safety improvements, the review of the cause of multiple crashes in the decade prior to this episode, the rapidly increasing complexity of aircraft, and the increasing number of aircraft in the sky. Brief reviews are presented of some possible safety improvements being investigated in this era, some of which hold promise, and some of are shown not to do so. The human factor is also discussed, such as aircrew responsibilities for the pilots and cabin staff, the need to rotate them for a new crew after a certain amount of time, as well as evacuation issues under various simulated conditions for the passengers.
116	16	"A Mediterranean Prospect"	March 18, 1980	0707
117	17	"Mr. Ludwig's Tropical Dreamland"	March 25, 1980	0708

=== Season 8: 1980–81 ===
No. overall	No. in season	Title	Original release date	Prod. code
118	1	"The Pinks and the Blues"	September 30, 1980	0709
Please add a Plot Summary here and in the episodes below, replacing this text. For guidance, see How to write a plot summary. Episode summaries must be expressed in your own words. Do NOT submit content you find from another web site as it is plagiarism and likely a copyright violation, which Wikipedia cannot accept and will be removed or reverted. Superficially modifying copyrighted content or closely paraphrasing it, even if the source is cited, still constitutes a copyright violation. As per the Television Plot Manual of Style, summaries should be about 100 to 200 words in length, and those substantially less than 100 words are most likely to be scrutinized for possible copyright violation. Note: Known as "The Secret Of The Sexes" as the Vestron Video release of 1988.
119	2	"The Cancer Detectives of Lin Xian"	October 7, 1980	0710
120	3	"The Sea Behind the Dunes"	October 14, 1980	0711
121	4	"Do We Really Need The Rockies?"	October 28, 1980	0712
122	5	"The Big IF"	November 4, 1980	0713
123	6	"Voyager: Jupiter & Beyond"	November 11, 1980	0714
124	7	"The Wizard Who Spat On The Floor"	November 18, 1980	0715
125	8	"The Water Crisis"	November 25, 1980	0716
126	9	"Moving Still"	December 2, 1980	0717
127	10	"A Touch of Sensitivity"	December 9, 1980	0718
128	11	"Red Deer of Rhum"	December 23, 1980	0719
129	12	"It's About Time"	December 30, 1980	0720
Please add a Plot Summary here, as per WP:PLOTSUM & MOS:TVPLOT. Note: Aired on the BBC in 1979.
130	13	"The Doctors of Nigeria"	January 6, 1981	0801
131	14	"Message In The Rocks"	January 20, 1981	0802
132	15	"The Dead Sea Lives"	January 27, 1981	0803
133	16	"Anatomy of a Volcano"	February 10, 1981	0804
134	17	"The Science of Murder"	February 17, 1981	0805
135	18	"The Malady of Health Care"	February 24, 1981	0806
136	19	"Beyond the Milky Way"	March 3, 1981	0807
137	20	"The Asteroid and the Dinosaur"	March 10, 1981	0808
138	21	"Animal Olympians"	March 17, 1981	0809
139	22	"Resolution on Saturn"	August 25, 1981	0810

=== Season 9: 1981–82 ===
No. overall	No. in season	Title	Original release date	Prod. code
140	1	"Computers, Spies, & Private Lives"	September 27, 1981	0811
Please add a Plot Summary here and in the episodes below, replacing this text. For guidance, see How to write a plot summary. Episode summaries must be expressed in your own words. Do NOT submit content you find from another web site as it is plagiarism and likely a copyright violation, which Wikipedia cannot accept and will be removed or reverted. Superficially modifying copyrighted content or closely paraphrasing it, even if the source is cited, still constitutes a copyright violation. As per the Television Plot Manual of Style, summaries should be about 100 to 200 words in length, and those substantially less than 100 words are most likely to be scrutinized for possible copyright violation.
141	2	"Why America Burns"	October 4, 1981	0812
142	3	"The Great Violin Mystery"	October 11, 1981	0813
143	4	"Cosmic Fire"	October 18, 1981	0814
144	5	"Locusts: "War Without End""	October 25, 1981	0815
145	6	"Did Darwin Get It Wrong?"	November 1, 1981	0816
146	7	"Artists in the Lab"	November 15, 1981	0817
147	8	"Notes of a Biology Watcher: A Film with Lewis Thomas"	November 22, 1981	0818
148	9	"City Spaces, Human Places"	November 29, 1981	0819
149	10	"Twins"	December 6, 1981	0820
150	11	"Salmon on the Run"	January 10, 1982	0901
151	12	"Test-Tube Babies: A Daughter For Judy"	January 17, 1982	0902
152	13	"A Field Guide to Roger Tory Peterson"	January 24, 1982	0903
153	14	"The Hunt for the Legion Killer"	January 31, 1982	0904
154	15	"Finding a Voice"	February 7, 1982	0905
155	16	"The Television Explosion"	February 14, 1982	0906
156	17	"Life: Patent Pending"	February 28, 1982	0907
157	18	"Palace of Delights"	March 7, 1982	0908
158	19	"Animal Impostors"	March 14, 1982	0909
159	20	"Aging: The Methuselah Syndrome"	March 28, 1982	0910

=== Season 10: 1982–83 ===
- For the week of January 4, 1983 to celebrate its 10th broadcast season, NOVA reaired its very first program "The Making of a Natural History Film" (which originally aired on March 3, 1974).

No. overall	No. in season	Title	Original release date	Prod. code
160	1	"The Case of the UFOs"	October 12, 1982	0911
Please add a Plot Summary here and in the episodes below, replacing this text. For guidance, see How to write a plot summary. Episode summaries must be expressed in your own words. Do NOT submit content you find from another web site as it is plagiarism and likely a copyright violation, which Wikipedia cannot accept and will be removed or reverted. Superficially modifying copyrighted content or closely paraphrasing it, even if the source is cited, still constitutes a copyright violation. As per the Television Plot Manual of Style, summaries should be about 100 to 200 words in length, and those substantially less than 100 words are most likely to be scrutinized for possible copyright violation.
161	2	"The Fragile Mountain"	October 19, 1982	0912
162	3	"Here's Looking At You, Kid"	November 9, 1982	0913
163	4	"Adventures of Teenage Scientists"	November 16, 1982	0914
164	5	"The Cobalt Blues"	November 23, 1982	0915
165	6	"Goodbye Louisiana"	November 30, 1982	0916
166	7	"Whale Watch"	December 7, 1982	0917
167	8	"Tracking The Supertrains"	December 14, 1982	0918
168	9	"Hawaii: Crucible of Life"	January 18, 1983	1001
169	10	"The Pleasure of Finding Things Out"	January 25, 1983	1002
170	11	"Lassa Fever"	February 8, 1983	1003
171	12	"The Miracle of Life"	February 15, 1983	1004
172	13	"Asbestos: A Lethal Legacy"	March 1, 1983	1005
173	14	"City of Coral"	March 8, 1983	1006
174	15	"Fat Chance in a Thin World"	March 22, 1983	1007
175	16	"Sixty Minutes to Meltdown"	March 29, 1983	1008

=== Season 11: 1983–84 ===
No. overall	No. in season	Title	Original release date	Prod. code
176	1	"Signs of the Apes, Songs of the Whales"	October 11, 1983	1009
Please add a Plot Summary here and in the episodes below, replacing this text. For guidance, see How to write a plot summary. Episode summaries must be expressed in your own words. Do NOT submit content you find from another web site as it is plagiarism and likely a copyright violation, which Wikipedia cannot accept and will be removed or reverted. Superficially modifying copyrighted content or closely paraphrasing it, even if the source is cited, still constitutes a copyright violation. As per the Television Plot Manual of Style, summaries should be about 100 to 200 words in length, and those substantially less than 100 words are most likely to be scrutinized for possible copyright violation.
177	2	"The Artificial Heart"	October 18, 1983	1010
In 1982, Seattle dentist Barney Clark was the first recipient of an artificial heart implant. He died in March 1983, having survived 112 days with the world's first permanent, pneumatic, totally artificial heart. NOVA follows the case with the surgeon, William DeVries, and looks at the prospects for this technology to save lives. It also explored the work of Dr. William F. Bernhard on the Left Ventricular Assist Device (LVAD) ongoing at the Cardiovascular Surgical Research Laboratories, Boston Children's Hospital Medical Center.
178	3	"Talking Turtle"	October 25, 1983	1011
179	4	"Papua New Guinea: Anthropology on Trial"	November 1, 1983	1012
180	5	"To Live Until You Die: The Work of Elisabeth Kübler-Ross"	November 8, 1983	1013
181	6	"A Magic Way of Going: The Story of Thoroughbreds"	November 15, 1983	1014
182	7	"A Normal Face: The Wonders of Plastic Surgery"	November 22, 1983	1015
183	8	"Captives of Care"	November 29, 1983	1016
184	9	"Twenty-Five Years in Space"	December 6, 1983	1017
185	10	"Nuclear Strategy for Beginners"	December 13, 1983	1018
186	11	"The Climate Crisis"	December 20, 1983	1019
187	12	"Eyes Over China"	December 27, 1983	1020
188	13	"Alcoholism: Life Under The Influence"	January 10, 1984	1021
189	14	"The Case of ESP"	January 17, 1984	1101
190	15	"Antarctica: Earth's Last Frontier"	January 31, 1984	1102
191	16	"China's Only Child"	February 14, 1984	1103
192	17	"Will I Walk Again?"	February 28, 1984	1104
193	18	"Visions of the Deep: The Underwater World of Al Giddings"	March 6, 1984	1105
194	19	"Down on the Farm"	March 20, 1984	1106
195	20	"Make My People Live: The Crisis in Indian Health Care"	March 27, 1984	1107
196	21	"The World According to Weisskopf"	April 3, 1984	1108

=== Season 12: 1984–85 ===
No. overall	No. in season	Title	Original release date	Prod. code
197	1	"Space Bridge to Moscow"	October 2, 1984	1120
Please add a Plot Summary here and in the episodes below, replacing this text. For guidance, see How to write a plot summary. Episode summaries must be expressed in your own words. Do NOT submit content you find from another web site as it is plagiarism and likely a copyright violation, which Wikipedia cannot accept and will be removed or reverted. Superficially modifying copyrighted content or closely paraphrasing it, even if the source is cited, still constitutes a copyright violation. As per the Television Plot Manual of Style, summaries should be about 100 to 200 words in length, and those substantially less than 100 words are most likely to be scrutinized for possible copyright violation.
198	2	"The National Science Test I"	October 16, 1984	1109
199	3	"Fountains of Paradise"	October 23, 1984	1110
200	4	"The Mystery of Yellow Rain"	October 30, 1984	1111
201	5	"The Nomads of the Rain Forest"	November 6, 1984	1112
202	6	"Farmers of the Sea"	November 13, 1984	1113
203	7	"Frontiers of Plastic Surgery"	November 20, 1984	1114
204	8	"Space Women"	November 27, 1984	1115
205	9	"Jaws: The True Story"	December 4, 1984	1116
206	10	"Acid Rain: New Bad News"	December 11, 1984	1117
207	11	"Stephen Jay Gould: This View of Life"	December 18, 1984	1118
208	12	"The Garden of Inheritance"	January 8, 1985	1119
209	13	"Edgerton and His Incredible Seeing Machines"	January 15, 1985	1201
210	14	"Global Village"	January 22, 1985	1202
Please add a Plot Summary here, as per WP:PLOTSUM & MOS:TVPLOT. Note: This episode contains Indian Prime Minister Indira Gandhi's last interview before she was assassinated.
211	15	"Conquest of the Parasites"	January 29, 1985	1203
212	16	"In the Land of the Polar Bears"	February 5, 1985	1204
213	17	"AIDS: Chapter One"	February 12, 1985	1205
214	18	"The Shape of Things"	February 19, 1985	1206
215	19	"Baby Talk"	February 26, 1985	1207
216	20	"A Mathematical Mystery Tour"	March 5, 1985	1208
217	21	"Child's Play: Prodigies and Possibilities"	March 12, 1985	1209
218	22	"Monarch of the Mountains"	March 19, 1985	1210

=== Season 13: 1985–86 ===
No. overall	No. in season	Title	Original release date	Prod. code
219	1	"The National Science Test II"	October 8, 1985	1211
Please add a Plot Summary here and in the episodes below, replacing this text. For guidance, see How to write a plot summary. Episode summaries must be expressed in your own words. Do NOT submit content you find from another web site as it is plagiarism and likely a copyright violation, which Wikipedia cannot accept and will be removed or reverted. Superficially modifying copyrighted content or closely paraphrasing it, even if the source is cited, still constitutes a copyright violation. As per the Television Plot Manual of Style, summaries should be about 100 to 200 words in length, and those substantially less than 100 words are most likely to be scrutinized for possible copyright violation.
220	2	"Seeds of Tomorrow"	October 15, 1985	1212
221	3	"What Einstein Never Knew"	October 22, 1985	1213
222	4	"The Robot Revolution?"	October 29, 1985	1214
223	5	"The Magic of Special Effects"	November 5, 1985	1215
224	6	"Child Survival: The Silent Emergency"	November 12, 1985	1216
225	7	"Tornado!"	November 19, 1985	1217
226	8	"The Genetic Gamble"	November 26, 1985	1218
227	9	"Animal Architects"	December 3, 1985	1219
228	10	"The Plane that Changed the World"	December 17, 1985	1220
This is the story of the Douglas DC-3 airliner. This episode discusses the reasons for its creation, and how major improvements in aerodynamics, propulsion, structures and instrumentation all came together to produce what is one of the most produced cargo aircraft in history. Contemporary and historic interviews are presented of leading engineers who were personally involved in the design of the DC-3. The advantages of the DC-3 over its period competitors are shown in period film clips, and interviews with pilots and stewardesses who were flight crew during the planes peak performance era add to this. War time service as the C-47 is discussed, with the advantages it provided for military operations. Post war commercial operation use is compared to the increasingly modern, larger and (later on) jet powered aircraft and show that the DC-3 gradually moved from front line use, to small niche type markets where the aircraft’s low purchase price and low operating cost allow it to remain competitive. An overhaul facility is visited showing the overhaul and rebuilding services available that allow the plane to keep flying, so many years after serial production was stopped in 1946.
229	11	"Halley's Comet: Once in a Lifetime"	January 21, 1986	1301
230	12	"Goddess of the Earth"	January 28, 1986	1302
231	13	"Horsemen of China"	February 4, 1986	1303
232	14	"Life's First Feelings"	February 11, 1986	1304
233	15	"The Case of the Frozen Addict"	February 18, 1986	1305
234	16	"Toxic Trials"	February 25, 1986	1306
235	17	"Skydive to the Rain Forest"	March 4, 1986	1307
236	18	"Return of the Osprey"	March 11, 1986	1308
237	19	"The Rise of a Wonder Drug"	March 18, 1986	1309
238	20	"When Wonder Drugs Don't Work"	March 25, 1986	1310
239	21	"Visions of 'Star Wars'"	April 22, 1986	TBA

=== Season 14: 1986–87 ===
No. overall	No. in season	Title	Original release date	Prod. code
240	1	"The Search for the Disappeared"	October 14, 1986	1311
Please add a Plot Summary here and in the episodes below, replacing this text. For guidance, see How to write a plot summary. Episode summaries must be expressed in your own words. Do NOT submit content you find from another web site as it is plagiarism and likely a copyright violation, which Wikipedia cannot accept and will be removed or reverted. Superficially modifying copyrighted content or closely paraphrasing it, even if the source is cited, still constitutes a copyright violation. As per the Television Plot Manual of Style, summaries should be about 100 to 200 words in length, and those substantially less than 100 words are most likely to be scrutinized for possible copyright violation.
241	2	"The Planet that Got Knocked on its Side"	October 21, 1986	1312
242	3	"High-Tech Babies"	November 4, 1986	1313
243	4	"Can AIDS Be Stopped?"	November 11, 1986	1314
244	5	"Is Anybody Out There?"	November 18, 1986	1315
245	6	"The Mystery of the Animal Pathfinders"	November 25, 1986	1316
246	7	"Are You Swimming in a Sewer?"	December 2, 1986	1317
247	8	"Sail Wars!"	December 9, 1986	1318
248	9	"Leprosy Can Be Cured!"	December 16, 1986	1319
249	10	"How Babies Get Made"	January 13, 1987	1320
250	11	"Countdown to the Invisible Universe"	January 20, 1987	1401
251	12	"Children of Eve"	January 27, 1987	1402
252	13	"Why Planes Crash"	February 3, 1987	1403
253	14	"Orangutans of the Rainforest"	February 10, 1987	1404
254	15	"Freud Under Analysis"	February 17, 1987	1405
255	16	"The Hole in the Sky"	February 24, 1987	1406
256	17	"Confessions of a Weaponeer"	March 3, 1987	1407
257	18	"Great Moments from NOVA"	March 10, 1987	Special
258	19	"Will the World Starve?"	March 24, 1987	1408
259	20	"The Desert Doesn't Bloom Here Anymore"	March 31, 1987	1409
260	21	"Rocky Road to Jupiter"	April 7, 1987	1410

=== Season 15: 1987–88 ===
No. overall	No. in season	Title	Original release date	Prod. code
261	1	"Death of a Star"	October 6, 1987	1411
For its 15th season premier, NOVA covers a fast-breaking science story as astronomers study a supernova in a nearby galaxy; a rare occurrence. Included are scenes taken from Las Campanas Observatory in Chile, and many others in the U.S., Australia and South Africa. Narrated by Bill Mason, it also was broadcast on Horizon by the BBC, the Norddeutscher Rundfunk (NDR) in West Germany, and the Australian Broadcasting Corporation (ABC).
262	2	"Spy Machines"	October 13, 1987	1412
Please add a Plot Summary here and in the episodes below, replacing this text. For guidance, see How to write a plot summary. Episode summaries must be expressed in your own words. Do NOT submit content you find from another web site as it is plagiarism and likely a copyright violation, which Wikipedia cannot accept and will be removed or reverted. Superficially modifying copyrighted content or closely paraphrasing it, even if the source is cited, still constitutes a copyright violation. As per the Television Plot Manual of Style, summaries should be about 100 to 200 words in length, and those substantially less than 100 words are most likely to be scrutinized for possible copyright violation.
263	3	"The Hidden Power of Plants"	October 20, 1987	1413
264	4	"Japan's American Genius"	October 27, 1987	1414
265	5	"A Man, A Plan, A Canal, Panama"	November 3, 1987	1415
266	6	"Volcano!"	November 10, 1987	1416
267	7	"How Good is Soviet Science?"	November 17, 1987	1417
268	8	"Ancient Treasures from the Deep"	December 1, 1987	1418
269	9	"Riddle of the Joints"	December 8, 1987	1419
270	10	"Secrets of the Lost Red Paint People"	December 15, 1987	1420
271	11	"Top Gun and Beyond"	January 19, 1988	1501
272	12	"How to Create a Junk Food"	January 26, 1988	1502
273	13	"Buried in Ice"	February 2, 1988	1503
274	14	"Why Planes Burn"	February 9, 1988	1504
275	15	"Battles in the War on Cancer: A Wonder Drug on Trial"	February 23, 1988	1505
276	16	"Battles in the War on Cancer: Breast Cancer – Turning the Tide"	March 1, 1988	1506
277	17	"The Mystery of the Master Builders"	March 8, 1988	1507
278	18	"Whale Rescue"	March 15, 1988	1508
279	19	"The Man Who Loved Numbers"	March 22, 1988	1509
280	20	"Race for the Superconductor"	March 29, 1988	1510
281	21	"Can You Still Get Polio?"	April 5, 1988	1511

=== Season 16: 1988–89 ===
No. overall	No. in season	Title	Original release date	Prod. code
282	1	"Pioneers of Surgery: The Brutal Craft"	September 6, 1988	1512
Please add a Plot Summary here and in the episodes below, replacing this text. For guidance, see How to write a plot summary. Episode summaries must be expressed in your own words. Do NOT submit content you find from another web site as it is plagiarism and likely a copyright violation, which Wikipedia cannot accept and will be removed or reverted. Superficially modifying copyrighted content or closely paraphrasing it, even if the source is cited, still constitutes a copyright violation. As per the Television Plot Manual of Style, summaries should be about 100 to 200 words in length, and those substantially less than 100 words are most likely to be scrutinized for possible copyright violation.
283	2	"Pioneers of Surgery: Into the Heart"	September 13, 1988	1513
284	3	"Pioneers of Surgery: New Organs for Old"	September 20, 1988	1514
285	4	"Pioneers of Surgery: Beyond the Knife"	September 27, 1988	1515
286	5	"Can the Vatican Save the Sistine Chapel?"	October 4, 1988	1516
287	6	"Can the Next President Win the Space Race?"	October 11, 1988	1517
288	7	"Do Scientists Cheat?"	October 25, 1988	1518
289	8	"Who Shot President Kennedy?"	November 15, 1988	1519
290	9	"The Light Stuff"	November 22, 1988	1520
291	10	"The All-American Bear"	December 6, 1988	1521
292	11	"Can We Make a Better Doctor?"	December 13, 1988	1522
Please add a Plot Summary here, as per WP:PLOTSUM & MOS:TVPLOT. Note: Part one of a ten-year study. See also "So You Want to Be a Doctor?", "Making of a Doctor", and "Doctors' Diaries".
293	12	"Hot Enough for You?"	January 17, 1989	1601
294	13	"The Last Journey of a Genius"	January 24, 1989	1602
Please add a Plot Summary here, as per WP:PLOTSUM & MOS:TVPLOT. Note: Re-narrated Horizon episode, "The Quest for Tannu Tuva".
295	14	"The Strange New Science of Chaos"	January 31, 1989	1603
296	15	"Back to Chernobyl"	February 14, 1989	1604
297	16	"God, Darwin and Dinosaurs"	February 21, 1989	1605
298	17	"Adrift on the Gulf Stream"	February 28, 1989	1606
299	18	"Secrets of Easter Island"	March 7, 1989	1607
300	19	"Legends of Easter Island"	March 14, 1989	1608
301	20	"The World Is Full of Oil!"	March 21, 1989	1609
302	21	"Confronting the Killer Gene"	March 28, 1989	1610

=== Season 17: 1989–1990 ===
No. overall	No. in season	Title	Original release date	Prod. code
303	1	"The Hidden City"	October 3, 1989	1611
Exposing four essential public infrastructure systems that city dwellers depend on: electricity, water, sewage and sanitation. Note: Filmed in New York City and hosted by Judd Hirsch.
304	2	"The Controversial Dr. Koop"	October 10, 1989	1612
Please add a Plot Summary here and in the episodes below, replacing this text. For guidance, see How to write a plot summary. Episode summaries must be expressed in your own words. Do NOT submit content you find from another web site as it is plagiarism and likely a copyright violation, which Wikipedia cannot accept and will be removed or reverted. Superficially modifying copyrighted content or closely paraphrasing it, even if the source is cited, still constitutes a copyright violation. As per the Television Plot Manual of Style, summaries should be about 100 to 200 words in length, and those substantially less than 100 words are most likely to be scrutinized for possible copyright violation.
305	3	"Design Wars!"	October 17, 1989	1613
306	4	"Echoes of War"	October 24, 1989	1614
307	5	"Decoding the Book of Life"	October 31, 1989	1615
308	6	"Hurricane!"	November 7, 1989	1616
309	7	"Will Venice Survive Its Rescue?"	November 14, 1989	1617
310	8	"What Is Music?"	November 21, 1989	1618
311	9	"Yellowstone's Burning Question"	December 5, 1989	1619
312	10	"The Schoolboys Who Cracked the Soviet Secret"	December 12, 1989	1620
313	11	"Poison in the Rockies"	January 9, 1990	1701
314	12	"Race for the Top"	January 23, 1990	1702
315	13	"Disguises of War"	February 6, 1990	1703
316	14	"The Bomb's Lethal Legacy"	February 13, 1990	1704
317	15	"The Big Spill"	February 27, 1990	1705
318	16	"The Genius That Was China: Rise of the Dragon"	March 20, 1990	1706
319	17	"The Genius That Was China: Empires in Collision"	March 27, 1990	1707
320	18	"The Genius That Was China: The Threat from Japan"	April 3, 1990	1708
321	19	"The Genius That Was China: Will the Dragon Rise Again?"	April 10, 1990	1709

=== Season 18: 1990–91 ===
No. overall	No. in season	Title	Original release date	Prod. code
322	1	"The KGB, The Computer and Me"	October 2, 1990	1710
Please add a Plot Summary here and in the episodes below, replacing this text. For guidance, see How to write a plot summary. Episode summaries must be expressed in your own words. Do NOT submit content you find from another web site as it is plagiarism and likely a copyright violation, which Wikipedia cannot accept and will be removed or reverted. Superficially modifying copyrighted content or closely paraphrasing it, even if the source is cited, still constitutes a copyright violation. As per the Television Plot Manual of Style, summaries should be about 100 to 200 words in length, and those substantially less than 100 words are most likely to be scrutinized for possible copyright violation.
323	2	"Neptune's Cold Fury"	October 9, 1990	1711
324	3	"To Boldly Go..."	October 16, 1990	1712
325	4	"Poisoned Winds of War"	October 23, 1990	1713
326	5	"The Blimp is Back!"	October 30, 1990	1714
327	6	"Earthquake!"	November 6, 1990	1715
328	7	"Killing Machines"	November 13, 1990	1716
329	8	"Can the Elephant Be Saved?"	November 20, 1990	1717
330	9	"We Know Where You Live"	November 27, 1990	1718
331	10	"In the Land of the Llamas"	December 4, 1990	1719
332	11	"What's Killing the Children?"	December 18, 1990	1720
333	12	"Return to Mt. St. Helens"	January 8, 1991	1801
334	13	"ConFusion in a Jar"	January 15, 1991	1802
335	14	"The Hunt for China's Dinosaurs"	February 5, 1991	1803
336	15	"Case of the Flying Dinosaur"	February 12, 1991	1804
The question of whether present-day birds are dinosaurs, and the origin of birds is explored.
337	16	"T. Rex Exposed"	February 19, 1991	1805
338	17	"Russian Right Stuff: The Invisible Spaceman"	February 26, 1991	1806
339	18	"Russian Right Stuff: The Dark Side of the Moon"	February 27, 1991	1807
340	19	"Russian Right Stuff: The Mission"	February 28, 1991	1808
341	20	"Swimming With Whales"	March 5, 1991	1809
342	21	"The Chip vs. the Chessmaster"	March 26, 1991	1810

=== Season 19: 1991–92 ===
No. overall	No. in season	Title	Original release date	Prod. code
343	1	"Sex, Lies and Toupee Tape"	October 1, 1991	1811
Please add a Plot Summary here and in the episodes below, replacing this text. For guidance, see How to write a plot summary. Episode summaries must be expressed in your own words. Do NOT submit content you find from another web site as it is plagiarism and likely a copyright violation, which Wikipedia cannot accept and will be removed or reverted. Superficially modifying copyrighted content or closely paraphrasing it, even if the source is cited, still constitutes a copyright violation. As per the Television Plot Manual of Style, summaries should be about 100 to 200 words in length, and those substantially less than 100 words are most likely to be scrutinized for possible copyright violation.
344	2	"So You Want to Be a Doctor?"	October 9, 1991	1812
345	3	"Secrets of the Dead Sea Scrolls"	October 15, 1991	1814
346	4	"Suicide Mission to Chernobyl"	October 22, 1991	1815
347	5	"Taller Than Everest?"	November 5, 1991	1816
348	6	"Fastest Planes in the Sky"	November 12, 1991	1817
To be the fastest has always been the goal of many. To be fastest in the sky meant fame, fortune, political status, or surviving a dog fight. This episode covers speed in the air from the very first flights of the Wright Brothers up to proposed aircraft that are planned to fly in space. As the need for speed drove the technology of both propulsion and aerodynamics, engineers, scientists and pilots pushed the boundaries of both, as well as that of safety, with often tragic results. Military developments were often the driver for improvements, but commercial use was also an important factor. The fundamental limit of speed that could be attained by propeller driven aircraft was realized early, and the reasons for this are shown with graphical simulations of the effects of ever increasing speed, as well as new problems encountered as speed increased. The contemporary status of high speed flight is reviewed as well as looking at future efforts that were under investigation at this time.
349	7	"Avoiding the Surgeon's Knife"	December 3, 1991	1818
350	8	"Skyscraper! A Nova Special"	December 10, 1991	1819
351	9	"The Fine Art of Faking It"	December 17, 1991	1820
352	10	"Hell Fighters of Kuwait"	January 14, 1992	1901
353	11	"Submarine!"	January 21, 1992	1902
354	12	"Saddam's War on Wildlife"	January 28, 1992	1903
355	13	"What Smells?"	February 11, 1992	1904
356	14	"Can You Believe TV Ratings?"	February 18, 1992	1905
357	15	"Making a Dishonest Buck"	March 3, 1992	1906
358	16	"Rescuing Baby Whales"	March 10, 1992	1907
359	17	"An Astronaut's View of the Earth"	March 17, 1992	1908
360	18	"Eclipse of the Century"	March 24, 1992	1909

=== Season 20: 1992–93 ===
No. overall	No. in season	Title	Original release date	Prod. code
361	1	"Animal Olympians II"	August 25, 1992	1910
Please add a Plot Summary here and in the episodes below, replacing this text. For guidance, see How to write a plot summary. Episode summaries must be expressed in your own words. Do NOT submit content you find from another web site as it is plagiarism and likely a copyright violation, which Wikipedia cannot accept and will be removed or reverted. Superficially modifying copyrighted content or closely paraphrasing it, even if the source is cited, still constitutes a copyright violation. As per the Television Plot Manual of Style, summaries should be about 100 to 200 words in length, and those substantially less than 100 words are most likely to be scrutinized for possible copyright violation.
362	2	"The Genius Behind the Bomb"	September 29, 1992	1911
363	3	"Mind of a Serial Killer"	October 13, 1992	1912
364	4	"Search for the First Americans"	October 20, 1992	1913
365	5	"Rafting Through the Grand Canyon"	October 27, 1992	1914
366	6	"This Old Pyramid"	November 4, 1992	1915
367	7	"Iceman"	November 10, 1992	1916
368	8	"The Private Lives of Dolphins"	November 17, 1992	1917
369	9	"Brain Transplant"	December 1, 1992	1918
370	10	"Can You Stop People From Drinking?"	December 22, 1992	1919
371	11	"Sex and the Single Rhino"	December 29, 1992	1920
372	12	"The Hunt for Saddam's Secret Weapons"	January 12, 1993	2001
373	13	"Can Bombing Win a War?"	January 19, 1993	2002
374	14	"The Deadly Deception"	January 26, 1993	2003
375	15	"Nazis and the Russian Bomb"	February 2, 1993	2004
376	16	"In the Path of a Killer Volcano"	February 9, 1993	2005
377	17	"Can Science Build a Champion Athlete?"	February 16, 1993	2006
378	18	"Diving for Pirate Gold"	February 23, 1993	2007
379	19	"Murder, Rape and DNA"	March 2, 1993	2008
380	20	"The Lost Tribe"	March 30, 1993	2009

== Sources ==
- "Nova – Past Television Programs". PBS. Retrieved on 20 December 2009
