= Langmuir Laboratory for Atmospheric Research =

Laboratory in New Mexico, United States

Coordinates: 33.9753°N 107.1807°W

- Established: 1963; 62 years ago
- Research type: Basic
- Field of research: Meteorology
- Director: Richard Sonnenfeld
- Operating agency: New Mexico Institute of Mining and Technology
- Website: www.langmuir.nmt.edu

The Langmuir Laboratory for Atmospheric Research is a scientific laboratory studying the cloud processes that produce lightning, hail, and rain, located in the Magdalena Mountains of central New Mexico. The lab is operated by the New Mexico Institute of Mining and Technology (New Mexico Tech) with funding from the National Science Foundation.

== History ==
The lab was founded in 1963, following pioneering research by E. J. Workman, the former president of the New Mexico Institute of Mining and Technology (then the New Mexico School of Mines), and others, including Nobel laureate Irving Langmuir, the namesake of the laboratory. The earlier studies took place on the Plains of San Agustin and the San Mateo Mountains.

== Location ==
The laboratory is located just south of South Baldy, the highest peak of the Magdalena mountains, at the southern end of the main ridge crest of the range, at an elevation of 10,679 ft (3,255 m). The Magdalena Mountains offer favorable conditions for the study of storms because of their frequency during the summer. Local storms are also often isolated, stationary, and relatively small.

The lab occupies the Langmuir Research Site, a congressionally-designated area within the Cibola National Forest, and operates under a Special Use Permit from the US Forest Service.

== Former Directors ==
Marvin H. Wilkening (1963-1969)
Charles B. Moore (1969-1985)
William P. Winn (1985-2013)
Kenneth B. Eack (2013-2019)
Harald E. Edens (2019-2021)
