= Pauline Irene Nguene =

Cameroonian petroleum engineer and politician (1958)

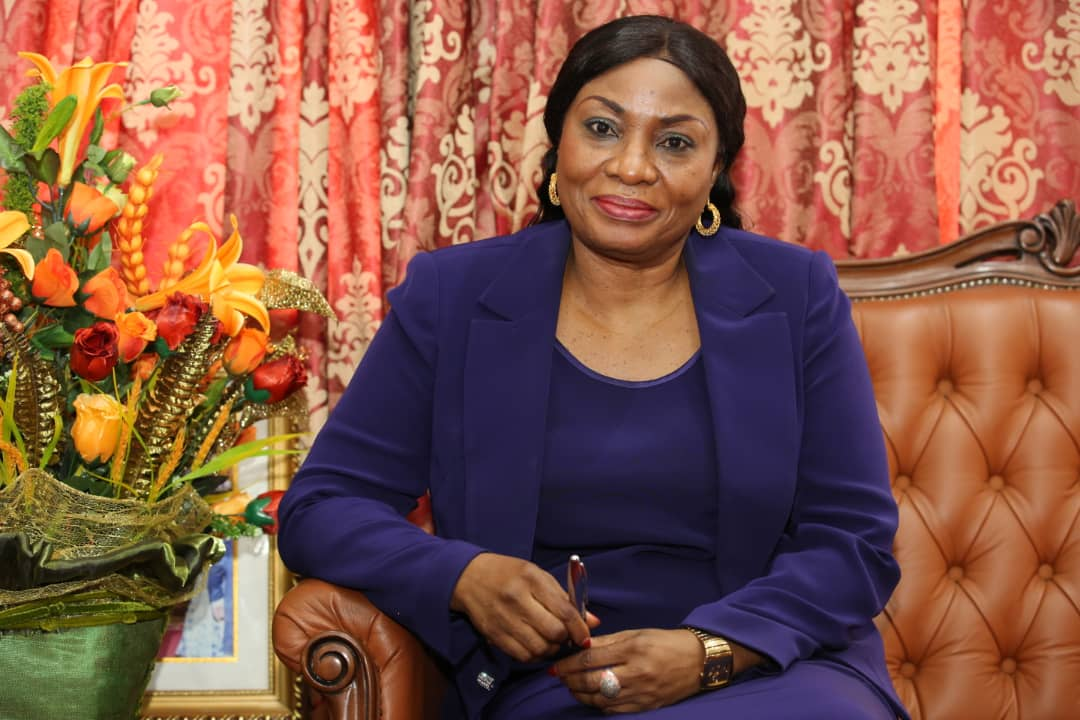
- Nguene in 2020

Minister of Social Affairs
- Incumbent
- Assumed office 2 October 2015
- Prime Minister: Philémon Yang; Joseph Ngute
- Preceded by: Felix Mbayu

Personal details
- Born: 4 July 1958 (age 68) Minka, Nyong-et-Kéllé, Cameroon
- Party: CPDM
- Education: New Mexico Institute of Mining and Technology (BS); University of Yaoundé (MS)
- Profession: Petroleum engineer

Pauline Irene Nguene (born 4 July 1958) is a Cameroonian petroleum engineer and politician who has served as Minister of Social Affairs since 2015.

== Early life ==
Nguene hails from Minka village (Makak) in the Nyong-et-Kellé Division, Centre Region, of the Republic of Cameroon. She is holder of a Bachelor of Sciences in petroleum engineering from the New Mexico Institute of Mining and Technology in the United States of America. She completed her training by obtaining a post-graduate diploma (“maîtrise”/ Master) in earth sciences from the University of Yaounde. She later obtained a Specialised Graduate Diplomas in oil companies management at HEC Montréal.

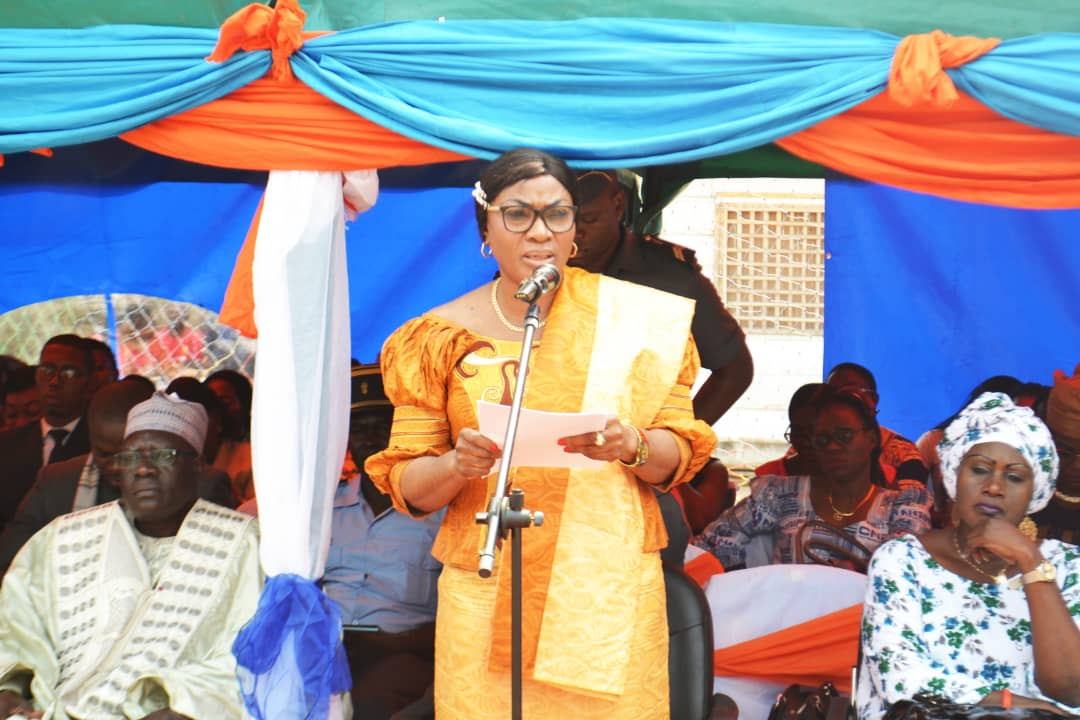
Cameroonian Minister of Social Affairs, Official ceremony at the Cardinal Paul Emile LEGER National Centre for the Rehabilitation of Persons with Disabilities (CNRPH-CPEL), Yaounde

== Studies ==
1-New-Mexico Institute of Mining and Technology in the United States of America: Bachelor of Sciences in petroleum engineering;
2-University of Yaounde: post-graduate diploma (“maîtrise”/Master) in earth sciences;
3-Higher Commercial Studies (HEC) - Montréal in Canada: Specialised Graduate Diplomas in oil companies management;

== Career ==
She returned to Cameroon in 1983. A few years later, she was appointed Service Head for Hydrocarbons Exploration in the Ministry of Mines, Water Resources and Energy. While working for this Ministry, she completed her training in engineering at the University of Yaounde where she obtained a post-graduate diploma (“maîtrise”) in earth sciences.
Having obtained a scholarship of ACDI (Canada) to study in the School of Higher Commercial Studies in Montréal, she obtained a Specialised Graduate Diplomas in oil companies management in that institution in 1988.
From 1991 to 2009, Mrs. NGUENE successively occupied the following posts in the Prime Minister’s Office:

- Attaché (1991-1992);
- Chargé de Mission (1992-2001);
- Technical Adviser (2001-2009).

On 13 January 2009, she was appointed by Presidential Decree Chairperson of the SUPPORT BOARD FOR THE REALIZATION OF PARTNERSHIP CONTRACTS (CARPA), an institution in charge of implementing Public-Private Partnerships (PPP) in Cameroon.
On 2 October 2015, she was appointed MINISTER OF SOCIAL AFFAIRS.
Since 2016, Mrs. NGUENE is equally the Chairperson of the Board of Directors of the Cardinal Paul Emile LEGER National Centre for the Rehabilitation of Persons with Disabilities (CNRPH-CPEL).

== Some big projects of the Ministry of Social Affairs ==
-The rehabilitation and modernization of the Cameroon Child Institute (l'institution Camerounaise de l'Enfance (ICE)) of Betamba in Ntui (Centre Region);
-The construction of the Rehabilitation Centre for Persons with Disabilities (CRPH) in Maroua (Far North Region);
-The fight against social exclusion and the implementation of social entrepreneurship;
-The putting in place of a Unified Social Register (a cartography of socially vulnerable persons);
-The modernization of the Cardinal Paul Emile LEGER National Centre for the Rehabilitation of Persons with Disabilities (CNRPH-CPEL).

== Honorific Distinction ==
Grand Officer of the Order of Valour (2019).
