= New Mexico Institute of Mining and Technology =

Public university in Socorro, New Mexico, US

- Type: Public university
- Established: 1889
- Academic affiliations: Space-grant
- Endowment: $47.7 million (2018)
- President: Michael Jackson (interim)
- Faculty: 175
- Undergraduates: 987 (fall 2024)
- Postgraduates: 486 (fall 2024)
- Location: Socorro, New Mexico, United States; 34.0668°N 106.9056°W
- Campus: Rural, 320 acres (130 ha) central, 40 mi² (100 km²) adjoining
- Nickname: Miners
- Website: www.nmt.edu

The New Mexico Institute of Mining and Technology (New Mexico Tech or NMT) is a public university in Socorro, New Mexico, United States.

It offers over 30 Bachelor of Science degrees in technology, the sciences, engineering, management, and technical communication, as well as graduate degrees at the masters and doctoral levels.

== History ==
With 987 degree-seeking undergraduate students and 486 degree-seeking graduate students as of fall 2024, New Mexico Tech is a relatively small university focused on science and engineering. It was founded by the New Mexico Territorial Legislature in 1889 as the New Mexico School of Mines with the goal of boosting the territorial economy by teaching mining specialties at the college level.

During the 1930s, petroleum engineering and technology also became an important field of study at the institute. In 1946, New Mexico Tech began offering graduate degrees. The institute adopted its current name in 1951 but the change was not legally effective until 1960, through an amendment of the New Mexico State Constitution, Art. XII, Section 11.

It also houses numerous research centers spanning diverse fields such as hydrology, astrophysics, explosives engineering, atmospheric physics, and cybersecurity.

== Research and teaching ==
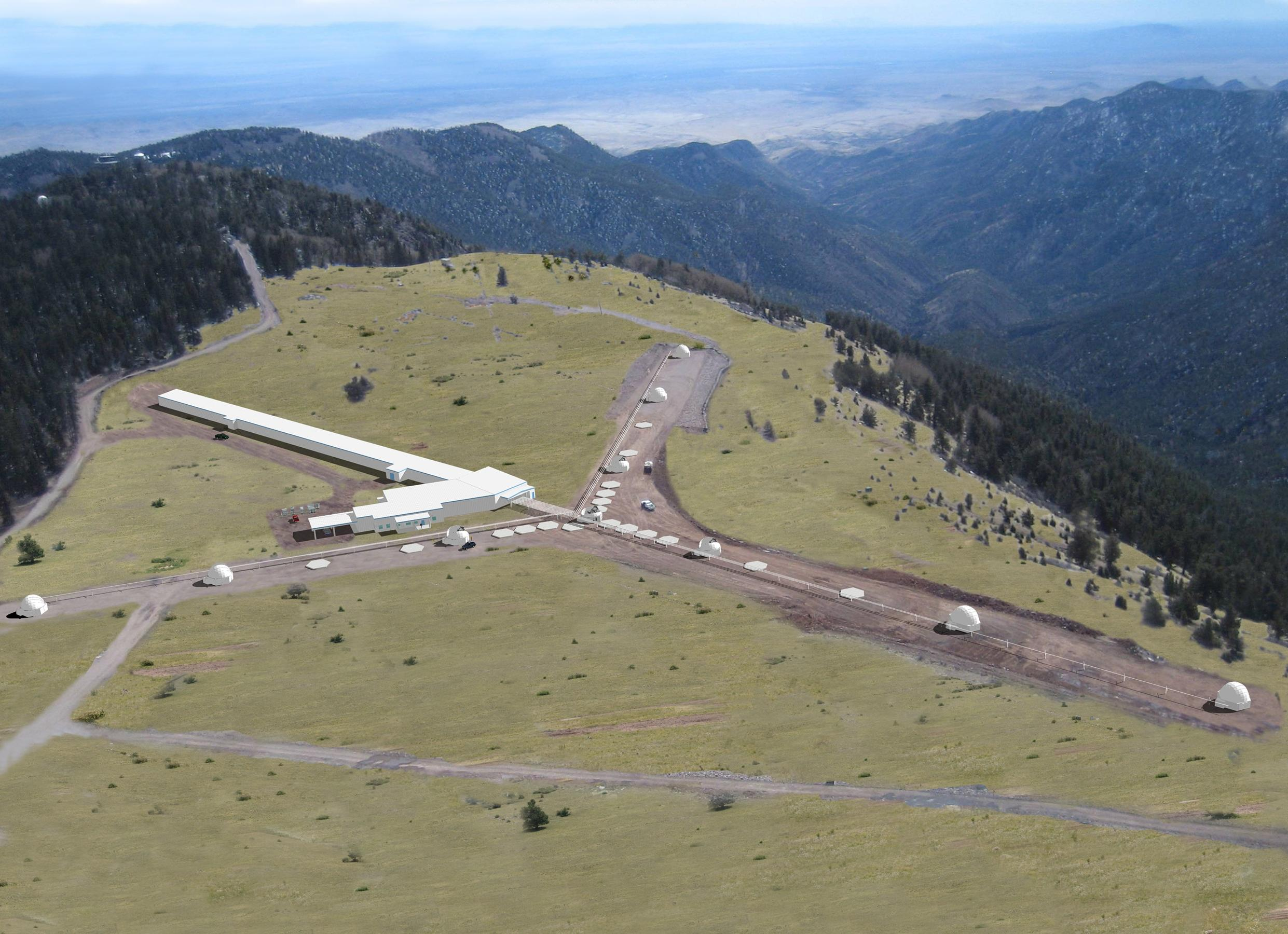
Magdalena Ridge Observatory (MRO), managed by New Mexico Tech's Office of Research and Economic Development, is located 20 miles (32 km) west of campus at an elevation of 10,500 feet (3,200 m) in the Cibola National Forest.

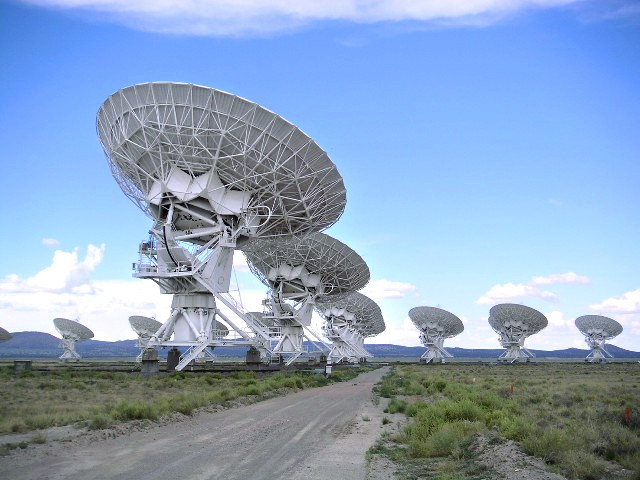
The Very Large Array (VLA): a 27-dish interferometer 60 miles (97 km) west of Socorro, with headquarters on the New Mexico Tech campus.

The EarthScope Primary Instrument Center (EPIC, formerly the IRIS PASSCAL Instrument Center), located on the New Mexico Tech campus.

New Mexico Tech's well-known areas of research and teaching include hydrology, astrophysics, atmospheric physics, geophysics, information technology, information security, Earth Science, energetic materials engineering, and petroleum recovery.

In 2003, with funds from the U.S. Department of Homeland Security, New Mexico Tech purchased the town of Playas, New Mexico, and the surrounding 1,200 acres (490 ha) to develop the Playas Training and Research Center, operated by the school's EMRTC, which provides training and research for the university's first responders, counterterrorism, and Air Force programs.

=== Affiliated science and engineering centers ===
- New Mexico Bureau of Geology and Mineral Resources
- Energetic Materials Research and Testing Center
- Institute for Complex Additive Systems Analysis
- The EarthScope Primary Instrument Center (EPIC, formerly the IRIS PASSCAL Instrument Center)
- Langmuir Laboratory for Atmospheric Research
- Magdalena Ridge Observatory
- National Cave and Karst Research Institute
- National Radio Astronomy Observatory (a National Science Foundation facility operated by Associated Universities, Inc. located on the New Mexico Tech campus)
- Petroleum Recovery Research Center
- Playas Training and Research Center

== Student life ==
Undergraduate demographics as of Fall 2023
| Race and ethnicity | Total |
|---|---|
| White | 45% |
| Hispanic | 41% |
| American Indian/Alaska Native | 4% |
| Asian | 3% |
| International student | 3% |
| Two or more races | 3% |
| Black | 1% |
Economic diversity
| Low-income (Note: The percentage of students who received an income-based federal Pell grant intended for low-income students.) | 33% |
| Affluent (Note: The percentage of students who are a part of the American middle class at the bare minimum.) | 67% |

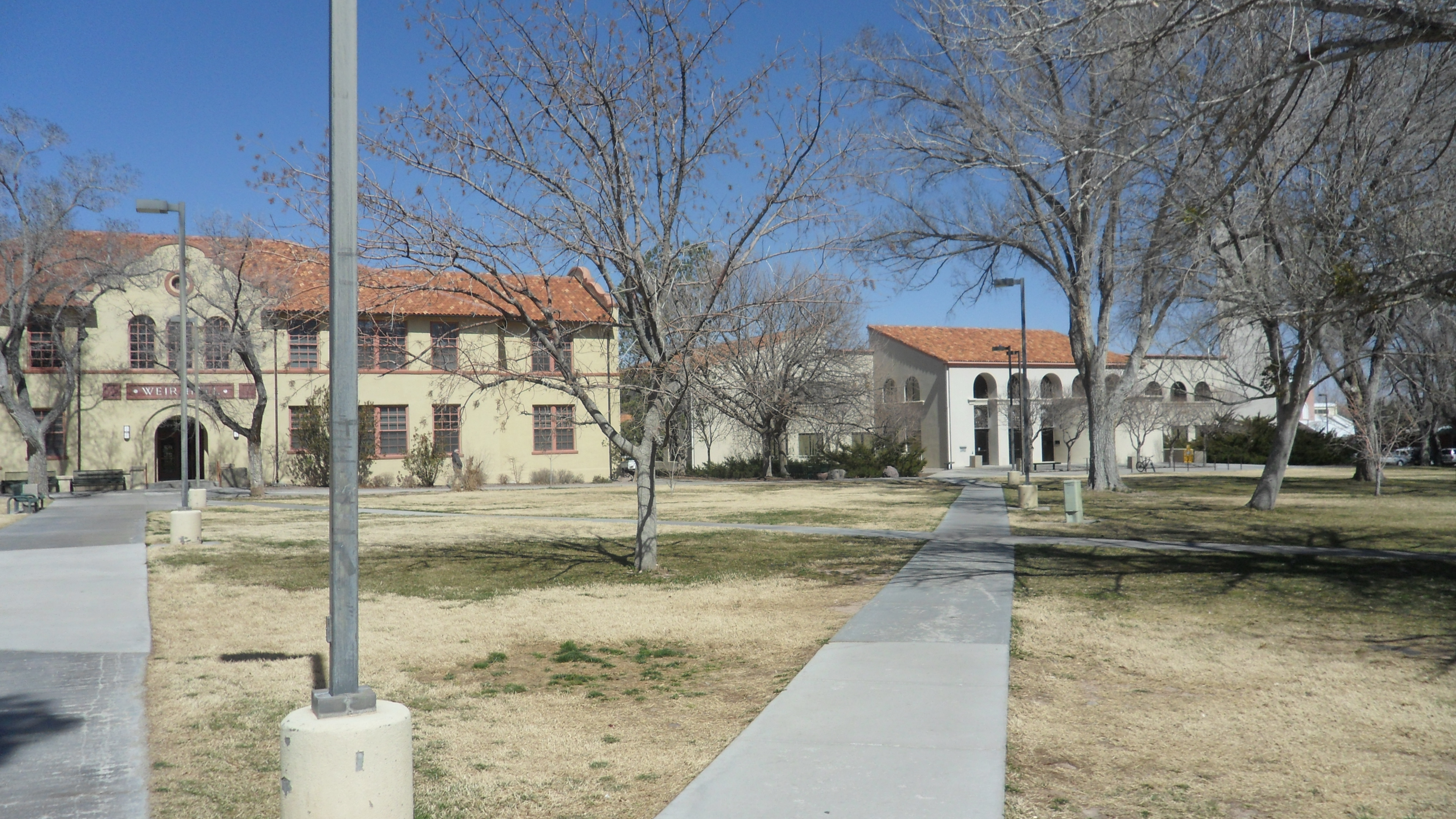
A view of Weir Hall (left) and the Library/Media Center (right) in the heart of campus.

NMT hosts an annual Performing Arts Series that is free to students, and, along with the broader Socorro community, city, and county, supports a great number of special events each year. New Mexico Tech is located approximately an hour south of Albuquerque in a region of high deserts to subalpine mountains that offers considerable outdoor recreation opportunities, including rock climbing, road and mountain biking, a triathlon, and hiking opportunities. New Mexico Tech also hosts numerous active student clubs, a Part 15 AM radio station, and a biweekly student newspaper, Paydirt. The campus includes an 18-hole championship golf course. The NMT student esports and rugby club teams recently won national championships.

NMT also hosts community outreach programs such a robotics demolition derby for 6th-12th graders and a weeklong summer science, technology, engineering, and mathematics program for high school students.

The campus population has historically been predominantly male, but it has moved increasingly towards a balance between the sexes. The gender distribution at New Mexico Tech as of 2021 is 68% male and 32% female.

== Presidents ==
The following people have served as president of New Mexico Institute of Mining and Technology:

| No. | Image | Name | Term start | Term end | Refs. |
|---|---|---|---|---|---|
| 1 | | Floyd Davis | 1893 | 1895 | |
| 2 | | William H. Seaman | 1895 | 1898 | |
| 3 | | Fayette Jones | 1898 | 1902 | |
| 4 | | Charles Keys | 1902 | 1905 | |
| 5 | | Robert P. Noble | 1905 | 1908 | |
| 6 | | Emmet A. Drake | 1908 | 1913 | |
| 7 | | Fayette Jones | 1913 | 1917 | |
| 8 | | Alexis Illinski | 1917 | 1921 | |
| 9 | | Edgar H. Wells | 1921 | 1939 | |
| 10 | | C.E. Needham | 1939 | 1942 | |
| 11 | | R.H. Reese | 1942 | 1946 | |
| 12 | | E. J. Workman | 1946 | 1965 | |
| 13 | | Stirling Colgate | 1965 | 1975 | |
| 14 | | Kenneth W. Ford | 1975 | 1983 | |
| 15 | | Lawrence H. Lattman | 1983 | 1993 | |
| 16 | | Daniel H. Lopez | 1993 | 2016 | |
| 17 | | Stephen G. Wells | July 1, 2016 | April 28, 2023 | |
| interim | | Daniel H. Lopez | April 29, 2023 | April 14, 2024 | |
| 18 | | Mahyar Amouzegar | April 15, 2024 | July 25, 2025 | |
| acting | | Michael Jackson | July 26, 2025 | September 15, 2025 | |
| interim | | Michael Jackson | September 15, 2025 | Present | |

== Notable alumni ==
- Conrad Hilton (born 1887) — American hotelier and the founder of the Hilton Hotels chain
- Larry Soderblom (born 1944) — American geophysicist with the Astrogeology Science Center at the United States Geological Survey in Flagstaff, Arizona, where he has served as chief of the Branch of Astrogeology
- Don Tripp (born 1946) — American politician and a Republican member of the New Mexico House of Representatives representing District 49 since January 1999
- Ed Fries — American video game programmer who led the Microsoft team that created the Xbox console
- Fred Baker (born 1951) — American engineer, specialized in developing computer network protocols for the Internet
- Ibrahim Mohammad Bahr al-Ulloum (born 1954) — Iraqi Minister of Oil from May 2005 to December 2005, while he was a member of the Islamic Virtue Party
- Terry Wallace (born 1954) — director of Los Alamos National Laboratory
- Lukas Lundin (born 1958) — Swedish-Canadian businessman, billionaire
- Jeffrey A. Lockwood (born 1960) — author, entomologist, and University of Wyoming professor of Natural Sciences and Humanities
- Axel Scherer — professor, California Institute of Technology, inventor of the Vertical-Cavity Surface-Emitting Laser (VCSEL)
- Jason Harper — American politician, Republican member of the New Mexico House of Representatives representing District 57 since January 15, 2013
- Pauline Irene Nguene — petroleum engineer and Cameroon Minister of Social Affairs

== Popular culture ==
A number of television shows have focused on New Mexico Tech faculty, students, and research. TruTV's Man vs. Cartoon features attempts by Tech's Energetic Materials Research and Testing Center to re-create contraptions and situations found in Wile E. Coyote and the Road Runner cartoons. MythBusters, National Geographic Explorer, BBC Horizon and Nova have also featured Tech in various episodes. Another TV show featuring Tech's Energetic Materials Research and Testing Center, Blow Up U, began filming in the spring of 2009.
