= Bear Mountains =

Mountain range in New Mexico, United States

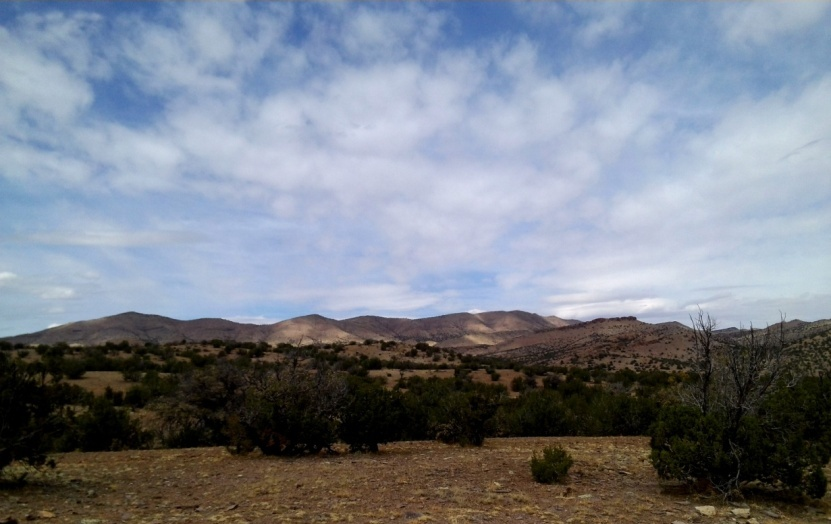
- Looking north at the Bear Mountains ridgeline.

- Location within New Mexico
- Location: New Mexico, United States
- Nearest city: Magdalena, NM
- Coordinates: 34.280°N 107.299°W
- Governing body: U.S. Forest Service, Cibola National Forest
- Website: www.fs.usda.gov/cibola/

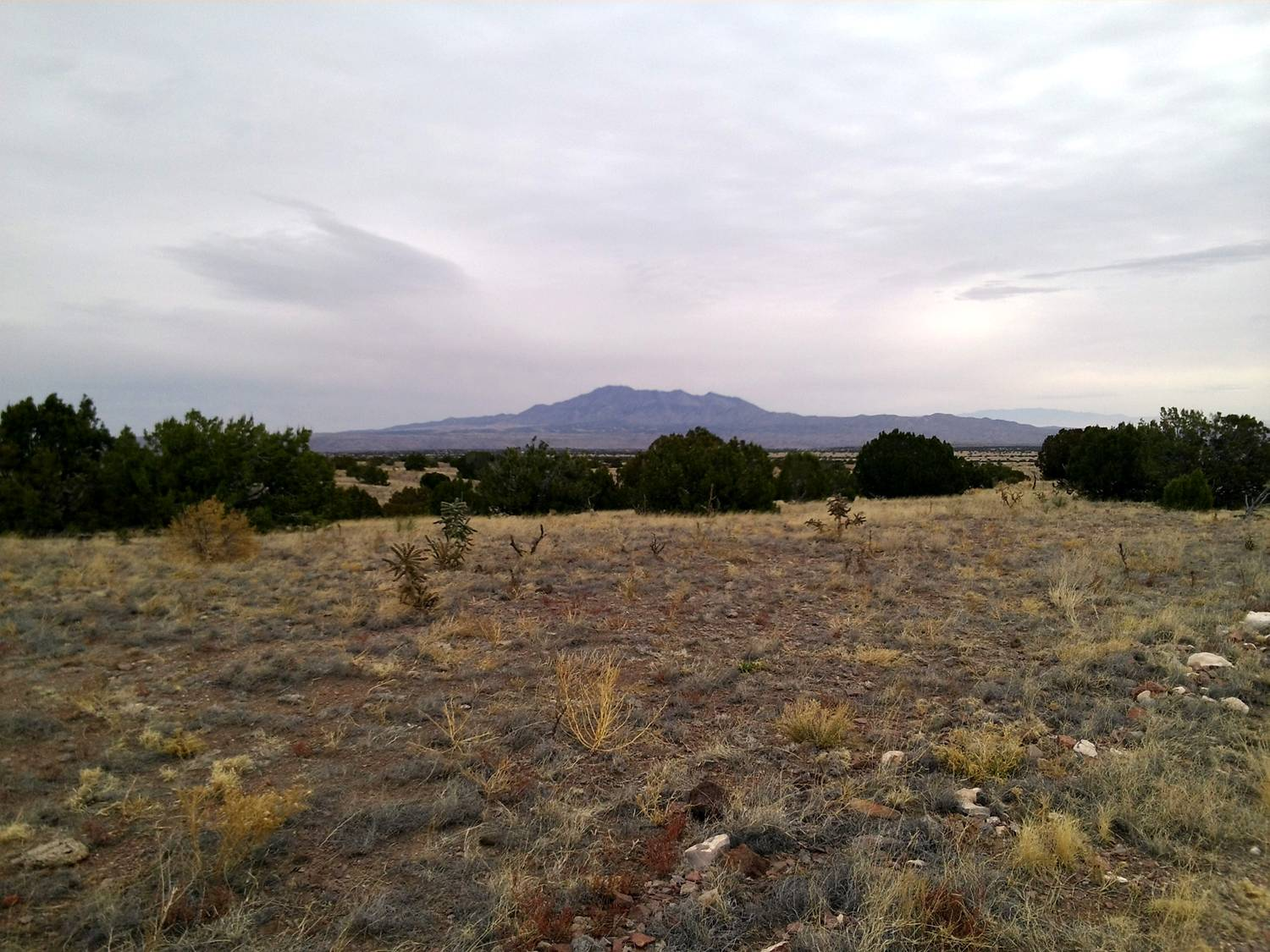
Looking east from the Scott Mesa Inventoried Roadless Area in the Bear Mountains.

The Bear Mountains lie just north of the village of Magdalena and north of the Magdalena Mountains in New Mexico. The Bear Mountains are located within the Magdalena Ranger District of the Cibola National Forest. There are two Inventoried Roadless Areas (IRA) within the Bear Mountains: the Scott Mesa IRA (39,534 acres) and the Goat Spring IRA (5,757 acres). The Bureau of Land Management’s Sierra Ladrones Wilderness Study Area (45,308 acres) stretches to the northeast of the Bear Mountains and connects the Bear Mountains with the 230,000-acre Sevilleta National Wildlife Refuge to the east. The world-renowned Very Large Array lies to the southwest of the Bear Mountains.

Robert Julyan's The Place Names of New Mexico notes that "bear" names throughout New Mexico frequently come from a particular incident with a bear rather than a general abundance of bears because "any encounter with a bear likely would have been memorable." Even so, the range is currently home to black bears, and grizzly bears were once found the area as well.

== History & Culture ==
Basham noted in his report documenting the archeological history of the Cibola's Magdalena Ranger District that “[t]he heritage resources on the district are diverse and representative of nearly every prominent human evolutionary event known to anthropology. Evidence for human use of district lands date back 14,000 years to the Paleoindian period providing glimpses into the peopling of the New World and megafaunal extinction.“ Much of the now Magdalena Ranger District was a province of the Apache. Bands of Apache effectively controlled the Magdalena-Datil region from the seventeenth century until they were defeated in the Apache Wars in the late nineteenth century.

== Recreation ==
Due to the absence of major light pollution, the Bear Mountains provide outstanding stargazing opportunities. The area also offers phenomenal hiking, backpacking, camping, hunting, and horseback-riding. As Robert Juylan points out in The Mountains of New Mexico, the range is rather popular among birdwatchers because of the various springs in the region.

== Ecology ==
As with other mountain ranges in west-central New Mexico, the variations in elevation result in diverse vegetative types. Scrubland, pinyon-juniper woodland, Gambel oak, mountain mahogany and grassland areas are all represented. Grasses include black and sideoats grama, poverty threeawn, fluffgrass, burrograss, and galleta grass. Shrubs that are mixed in the grasslands include sotol, cholla, yucca, and Apache plume. Wildlife includes mountain lion, pronghorn, mule deer, black bear, and coyote as well as numerous bird species.

Wildlife in the Bear Mountains
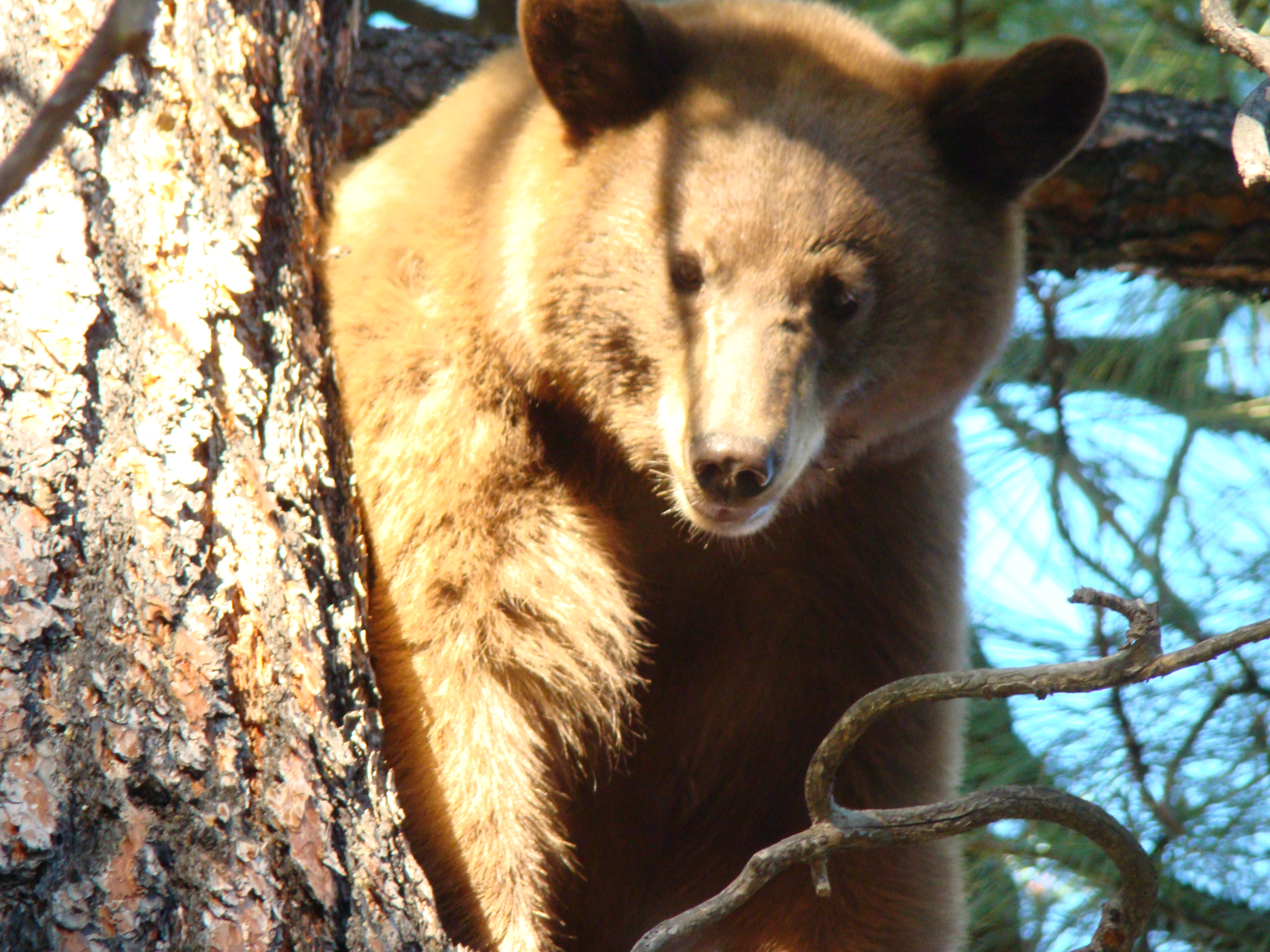
A black bear in Cibola National Forest. Photo: US Forest Service.

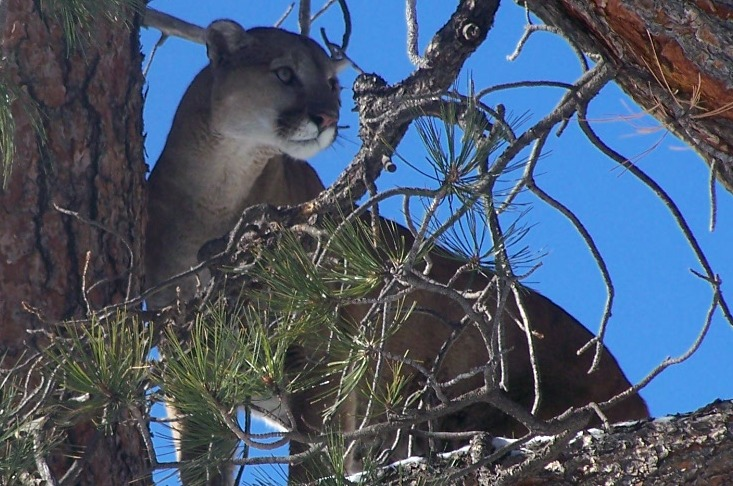
A mountain lion in the Cibola National Forest. Photo: US Forest Service.

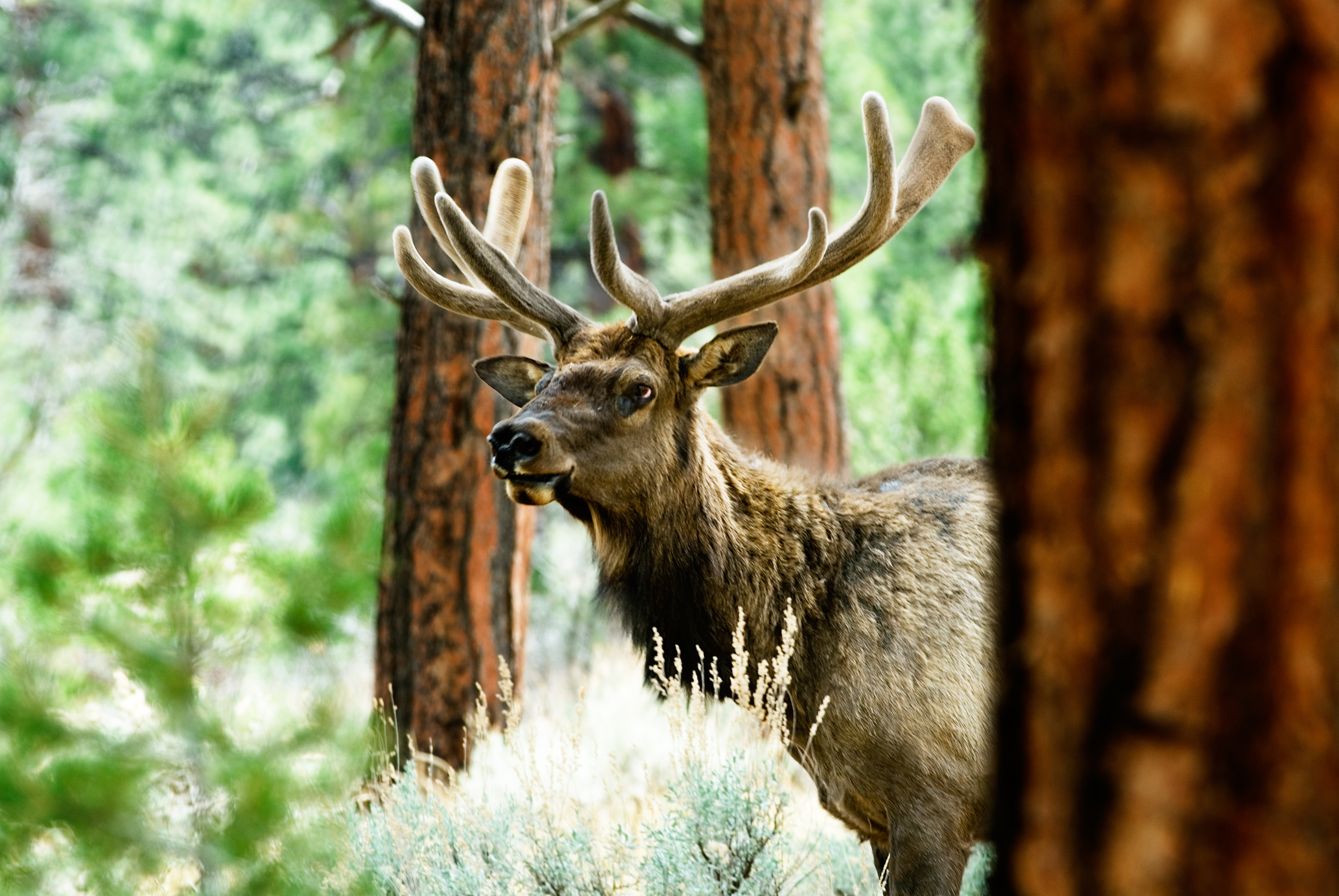
An elk. Photo: US Forest Service.

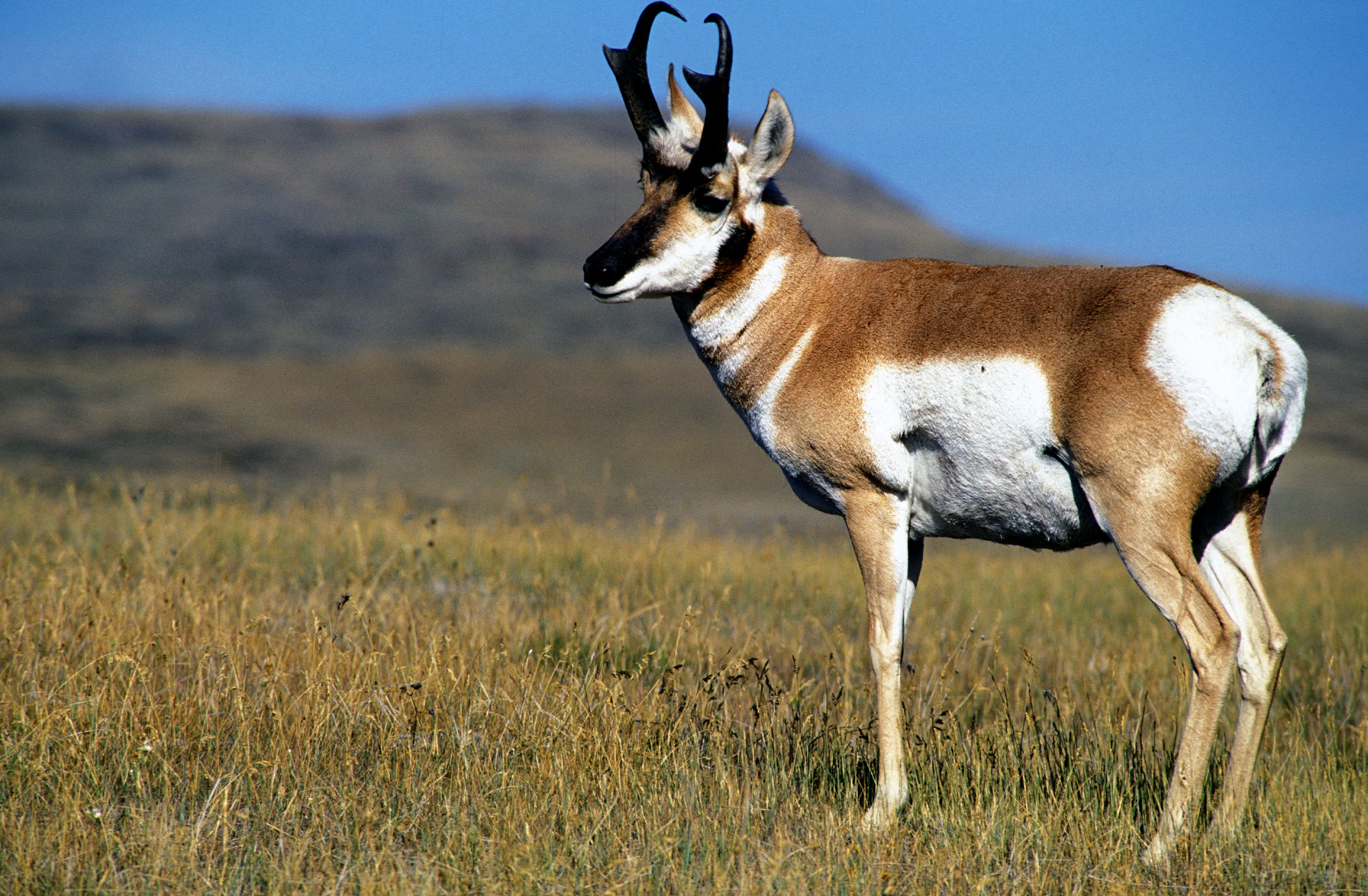
Pronghorn are found in the Bear Mountains.

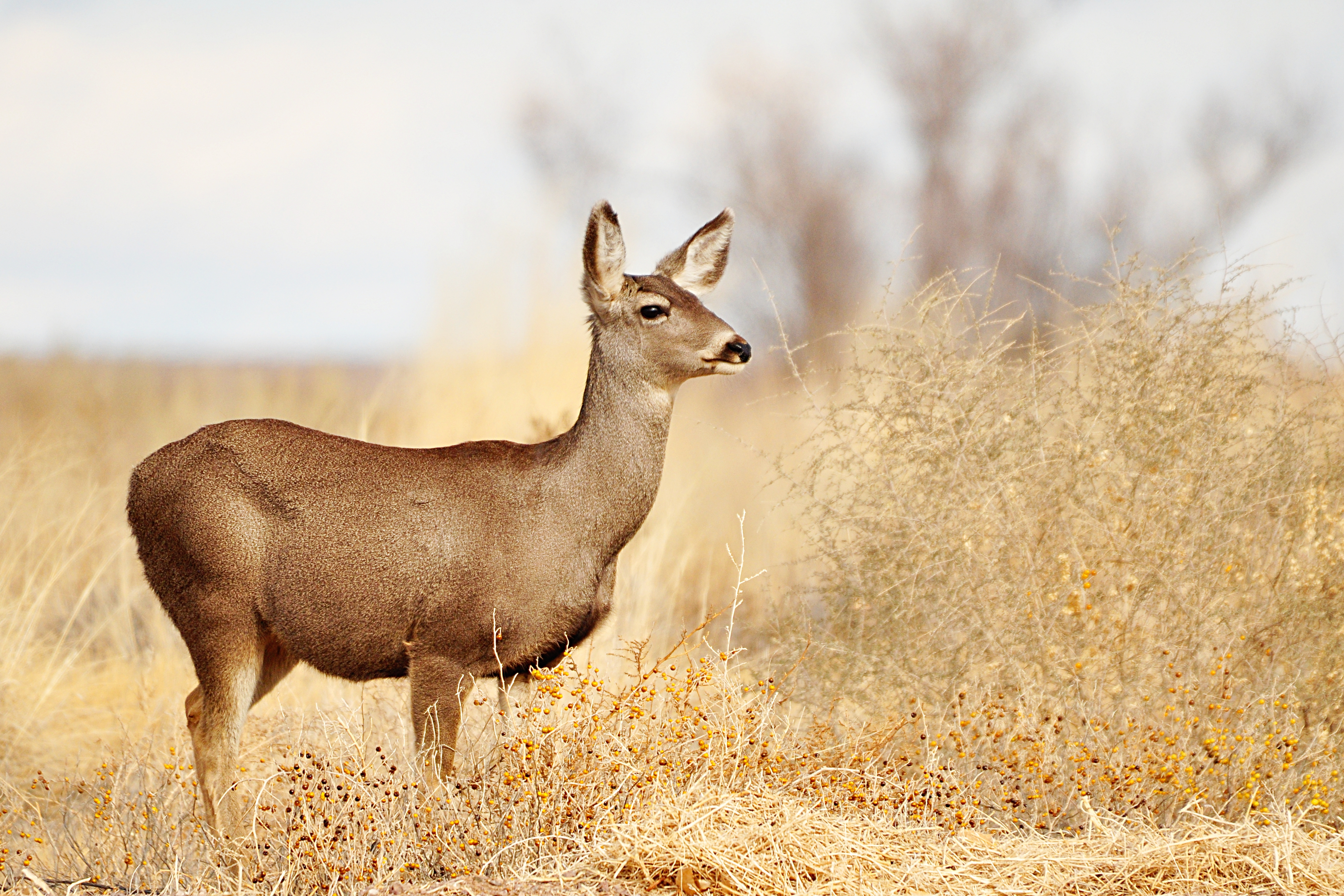
A mule deer in New Mexico. Photo: Shanthanu Bhardwaj

== See also ==
- American black bear
- Ladron Peak
- Sevilleta National Wildlife Refuge
- Socorro County, New Mexico
