= Rio Salado (New Mexico) =

- Location of the mouth of the Rio Salado in New Mexico
- Etymology: Spanish, "salty river"

Location
- Country: United States
- State: New Mexico
- County: Socorro, Catron

Physical characteristics
- Source: Northeast Catron County
  - coordinates: 34°29′44″N 107°53′30″W
  - elevation: 7,990 ft (2,440 m)
- Mouth: Rio Grande
  - location: North of Socorro
  - coordinates: 34°16′23″N 106°51′31″W
  - elevation: 4,678 ft (1,426 m)
- Length: 86 mi (138 km)

The Rio Salado is a tributary of the Rio Grande in the U.S. state of New Mexico. From its source in northeast Catron County it flows about 86 miles (138 km) generally east to join the Rio Grande just north of Polvadera and about 15 miles (24 km) north of Socorro. The name Río Salado is Spanish for "salty river".

== Course ==
The Rio Salado originates in northeastern Catron County. It flows east, then north, then southeast through Cow Spring Canyon. It is joined by Miguel Chavez Canyon from the north, which it then flows through, turning eastward. Kicking Bear Wash joins from the north, after which the Rio Salado enters Socorro County. It continues to flow east through Miguel Chavez Canyon, collecting minor tributaries. A longer tributary, Alamocita Creek, joins from the southwest. Then Gallegos Creek joins from the north. Rio Salado passes between Table Mountain and Tres Hermanos Mesa. Alamo Creek and Jaralosa Creek join from the south, then Cottonwood Draw from the north. Rio Salado then passes by Puertecito, after which it is joined by Cañada Bonita from the north. It continues to flow east, joined by a number of minor tributaries flowing from the Bear Mountains and Ladron Peak. As Rio Salado passes through the Sevilleta National Wildlife Refuge it is joined by La Jenica Creek, Silver Creek, and Arroyo Rendija, from the south, and Cañada Popotosa and Arroyo Tio Lino from the north. Rio Salado empties into the Rio Grande just north of Polvadera, about 15 miles (24 km) north of Socorro.

Along its course the Rio Salado passes along the northern edge of the Cibola National Forest.

== See also ==
- List of rivers of New Mexico
- List of tributaries of the Rio Grande
