= New Mexico State Road 107 =

State highway in New Mexico, United States

State Road 107

Route information
- Maintained by NMDOT
- Length: 41.722 mi (67.145 km)

Major junctions
- South end: NM 1 southwest of Socorro
- I-25 / US 85 southwest of Socorro
- North end: US 60 in Magdalena

Location
- Country: United States
- State: New Mexico
- Counties: Socorro

Highway system
- New Mexico State Highway System; Interstate; US; State; Scenic
← NM 106	→ NM 108

State Road 107 (NM 107) is a 41.722-mile-long (67.145 km) state highway located entirely within Socorro County in the U.S. state of New Mexico. NM 107's southern terminus is at NM 1 southwest of the City of Socorro, and the northern terminus is at U.S. Route 60 (US 60) in the community of Magdalena.

== Major intersections ==
The entire route is in Socorro County.

Location	mi	km	Destinations	Notes
	0.000	0.000	NM 1 (Old US 85) – Fort Craig	Southern terminus
	0.122	0.196	I-25 / US 85 (CanAm Highway) – Socorro, Las Cruces	I-25 exit 115
Magdalena	41.722	67.145	US 60 – Datil, Socorro	Northern terminus
1.000 mi = 1.609 km; 1.000 km = 0.621 mi
