= New Mexico State Road 1 =

State highway in New Mexico, United States

State Road 1
- NM 1 highlighted in red

Route information
- Maintained by NMDOT
- Length: 61.269 mi (98.603 km)

Major junctions
- South end: I-25 north of Truth or Consequences
- US 380 in San Antonio
- North end: I-25 BL near Socorro

Location
- Country: United States
- State: New Mexico
- Counties: Sierra, Socorro

Highway system
- New Mexico State Highway System; Interstate; US; State; Scenic
← NM 6563	→ NM 2

State Road 1 (NM 1) is a state highway in New Mexico, that runs north from Mitchell Point to Socorro. Mostly paralleling Interstate 25 (I-25) throughout its entire length, it has a total length of 61.269 miles (98.603 km), and is maintained by the New Mexico Department of Transportation (NMDOT).

After an intersection with NM 107, NM 1 passes dirt roads leading to Fort Craig and San Marcial. It then goes through the Bosque del Apache National Wildlife Refuge, as well as the communities of San Antonio, where it intersects U.S. Route 380 (US 380), and Luis Lopez, before ending in Socorro.

== Route description ==
State Road 1 begins at an interchange with Interstate 25, in Mitchell Point. It then quickly turns to parallel I-25, and travels alongside the freeway through barren terrain. The route begins to turn away from I-25 near the Sierra–Socorro county line, and connects to I-25 Exit 100 via a spur.

In Socorro County, State Road 1 continues to parallel I-25, though at a greater distance. NM 1 crosses under the larger highway as they near a rest area, serving I-25 traffic. Shortly thereafter, State Road 1 intersects State Road 107, providing a connection to Magdalena. Past NM 107, NM 1 passes a dirt road, allowing access to the former Fort Craig. The road begins traveling in a more easterly direction, coming close to the Rio Grande. NM 1 intersects another dirt road, which provides access to San Marcial, and passes through the Bosque del Apache National Wildlife Refuge, on the way to San Antonio.

Known as Main Street in San Antonio, State Road 1 intersects U.S. Route 380. NM 1 also goes through Luis Lopez, before crossing over I-25 again, turning again to parallel the successor route. The older road travels north, passing by the Socorro Municipal Airport before ending at I-25 Bus. in Socorro.

== History ==
State Road 1 generally follows the route of El Camino Real de Tierra Adentro, which was a colonial trade route between Mexico City and San Juan Pueblo (present day Ohkay Owingeh). This became the original State Road 1 upon the initial definition of highways.

In the initial plans for the U.S. Highway System, the portion of State Road 1 south of Raton was designated as U.S. Route 466 (US 466; not to be confused with the later, signed route of the same number, now decommissioned). However, by the time the plan was finalized, US 466 had been merged into U.S. Route 85. Also, US 66 ran on the part of State Road 1 from south of Las Vegas to Los Lunas.

In the 1960s, US 85 was almost entirely supplanted by Interstate 25. The U.S. Route 85 designation has since been completely deleted from the NMDOT route logs, (although AASHTO retains the US-85 designation, following I-25 and I-10 through New Mexico to maintain continuity between signed segments in Texas and Colorado). The State Road 1 designation was then resurrected for use on the portion of old US 85 from Truth or Consequences to Socorro.

== Major intersections ==
County	Location	mi	km	Destinations	Notes
Sierra		0.000	0.000	Monticello Point Road	Continuation beyond I-25
Sierra		0.000	0.000	I-25 / US 85 – Albuquerque, El Paso	Southern terminus; I-25 exit 92
Sierra		8.900	14.323	To I-25 / US 85 – Albuquerque, El Paso	To I-25 exit 100
Socorro		25.380	40.845	NM 107 north to I-25 / US 85 – Magdalena	Southern terminus of NM 107; to I-25 exit 115
Socorro	San Antonio	51.565	82.986	US 380 – Carrizozo	
Socorro	Socorro	61.269	98.603	I-25 BL – Socorro	Northern terminus
1.000 mi = 1.609 km; 1.000 km = 0.621 mi
