= Box Recreation Area =

Climbing area in New Mexico, US

Coordinates: 34°0′15.2″N 106°59′22.2″W

Box Recreation Area is a 320-acre area that is popular for rock climbing and bouldering due to its rugged terrain. It is located near Socorro, New Mexico and consists of a box canyon with five cliffs on each side. Only those who are proficient at rock climbing are advised to attempt the challenges posed by this area. It is under the supervision of the Bureau of Land Management.

Located about an hour's drive from Albuquerque, Box Canyon is composed of rhyolite rock, smooth in some places but also sharp with pockets in others.
