= Adobe Ranch, Socorro County, New Mexico =

Locale in New Mexico, United States

Coordinates: 33°51′44″N 106°18′18″W

Adobe Ranch also known as Adobe, is a locale in Socorro County, New Mexico, United States. It lies at an elevation of 5,915 feet (1,803 meters).

== History ==
Adobe was a stagecoach stop in the 19th century. It had a post office from 1933 to 1938, when mail was sent to Bingham.

== The Site Today ==
The site of Adobe is now occupied by the Adobe Ranch, 32 miles east of San Antonio, New Mexico on U.S. Route 380.
