= Riley, New Mexico =

Ghost town in New Mexico, U.S.

Coordinates: 34°22′50″N 107°13′47″W

Riley is located in Socorro County in the U.S. state of New Mexico. Settled in 1892, it is situated about 20 mi (32 km) north of Magdalena, New Mexico, on Cibola NF road 354 and is a habitated ghost town.
