= San Miguel de Socorro =

Historic church in New Mexico, United States

- San Miguel Church
- U.S. National Register of Historic Places
- NM State Register of Cultural Properties
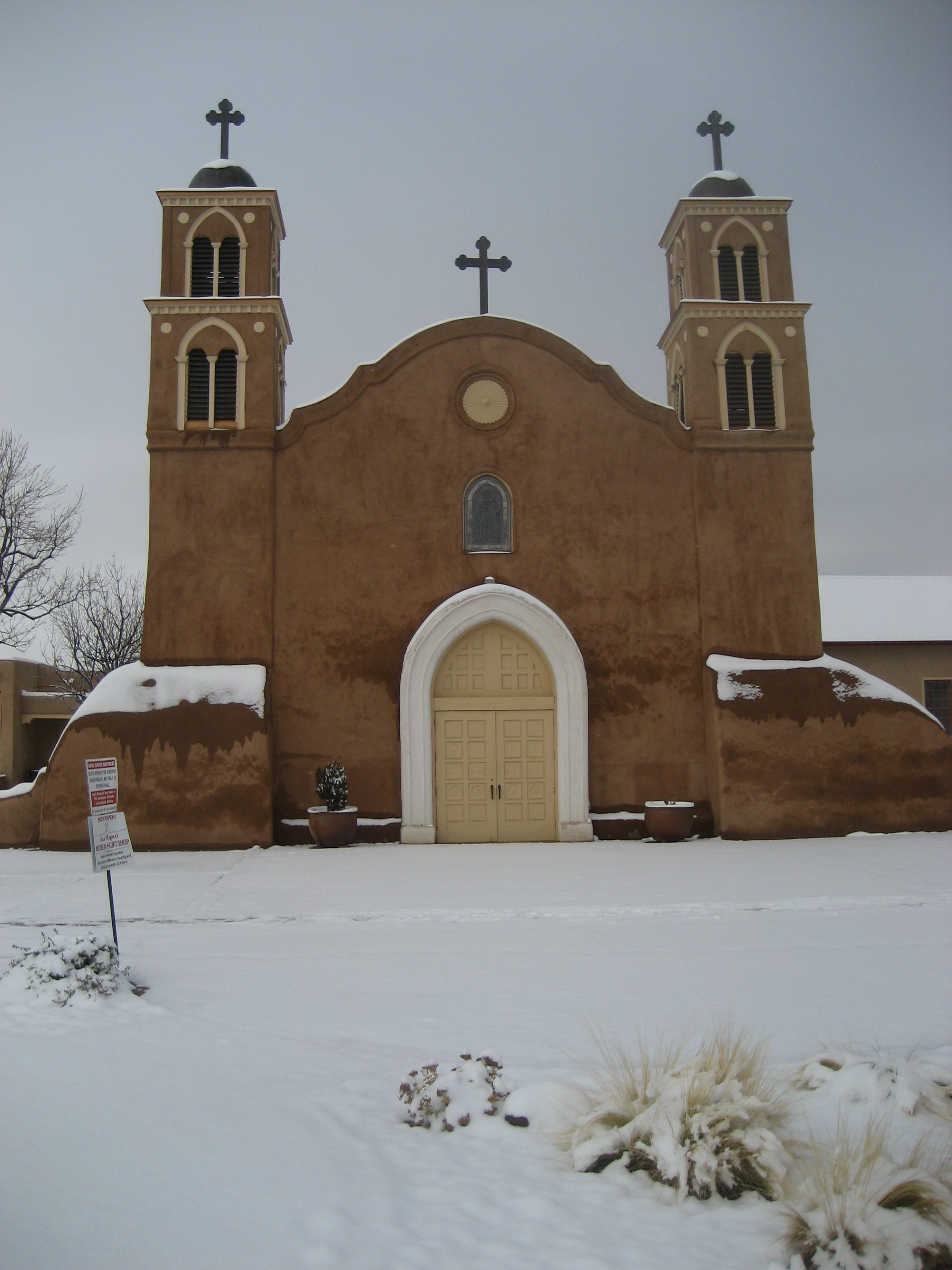
- San Miguel de Socorro Church, November 2013

- Location within New Mexico Location within the United States
- Location: 403 El Camino Real St. NW, Socorro, New Mexico
- Coordinates: 34°3′37″N 106°53′38″W
- Built: c. 1821
- Architectural style: Spanish Colonial, Mission/Spanish Colonial Revival
- MPS: Camino Real in New Mexico, AD 1598-1881 MPS
- NRHP reference No.: 16000162
- NMSRCP No.: 291

Significant dates
- Added to NRHP: April 12, 2016
- Designated NMSRCP: July 27, 1973

San Miguel de Socorro is the Catholic church in Socorro, New Mexico, built on the ruins of the old Nuestra Señora de Socorro mission. The old mission was built around 1627, but was destroyed in 1680 during the Pueblo Revolt. A portion of the adobe wall of the old church remains today and still can be seen behind glass just left of the altar. The building was listed on the National Register of Historic Places in 2016.

San Miguel is administered by the Archdiocese of Santa Fe.

== History and legend ==
According to the San Miguel website, it is the oldest Catholic church in the United States, founded in 1598. Although the village of Socorro was founded at this time, and the Nuestra Senora de Socorro was built in the 17th century, San Miguel itself was not built until the 19th century. The construction of the church was most likely completed by 1821 when the first church baptisms, burials and marriages were recorded.

Local legend has it that during an Apache raid, an angel appeared and scared off the invaders. Parishioners thus decided to name the church after St. Michael, the archangel who supposedly saved the village.

The last Mexican governor of New Mexico, Manuel Armijo, is buried at the church.

== See also ==
- National Register of Historic Places listings in Socorro County, New Mexico
