= Socorro County, New Mexico =

County in New Mexico, United States

- County
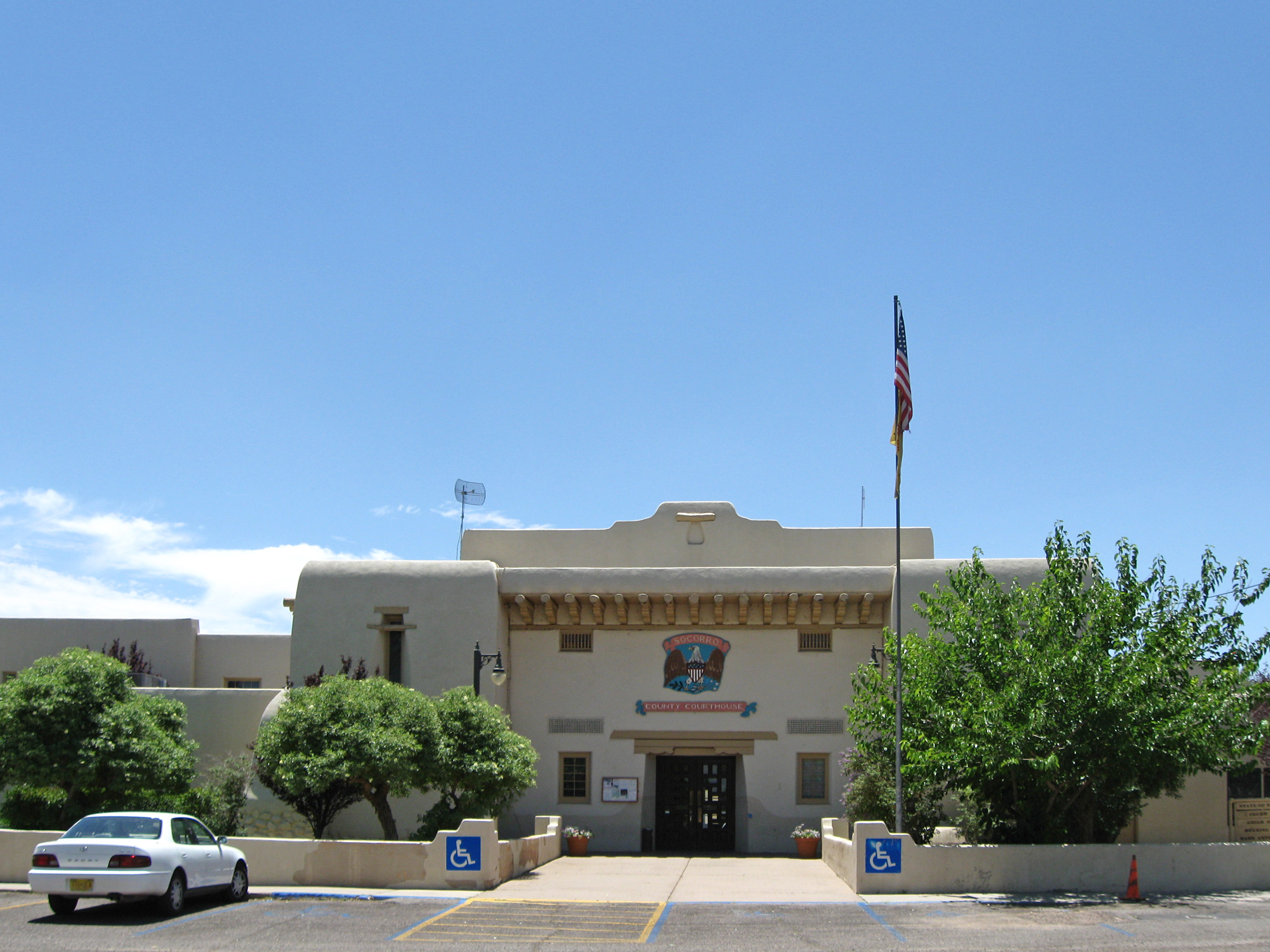
- Socorro County Courthouse in Socorro

- Location within the U.S. state of New Mexico
- Coordinates: 34°01′N 106°56′W
- Country: United States
- State: New Mexico
- Founded: January 9, 1852
- Seat: Socorro
- Largest city: Socorro

Area
  - Total: 6,649 sq mi (17,220 km^{2})
  - Land: 6,647 sq mi (17,220 km^{2})
  - Water: 2.1 sq mi (5.4 km^{2}) 0.03%

Population (2020)
  - Total: 16,595
  - Estimate (2025): 15,838 ▼
  - Density: 2.497/sq mi (0.9639/km^{2})
- Time zone: UTC−7 (Mountain)
  - Summer (DST): UTC−6 (MDT)
- Congressional district: 2nd
- Website: www.socorrocounty.net

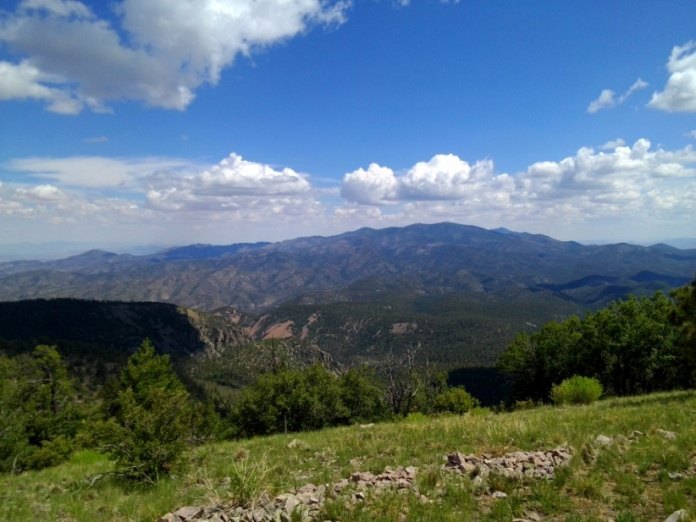
The view from the southern San Mateo Mountains in Socorro County, New Mexico.

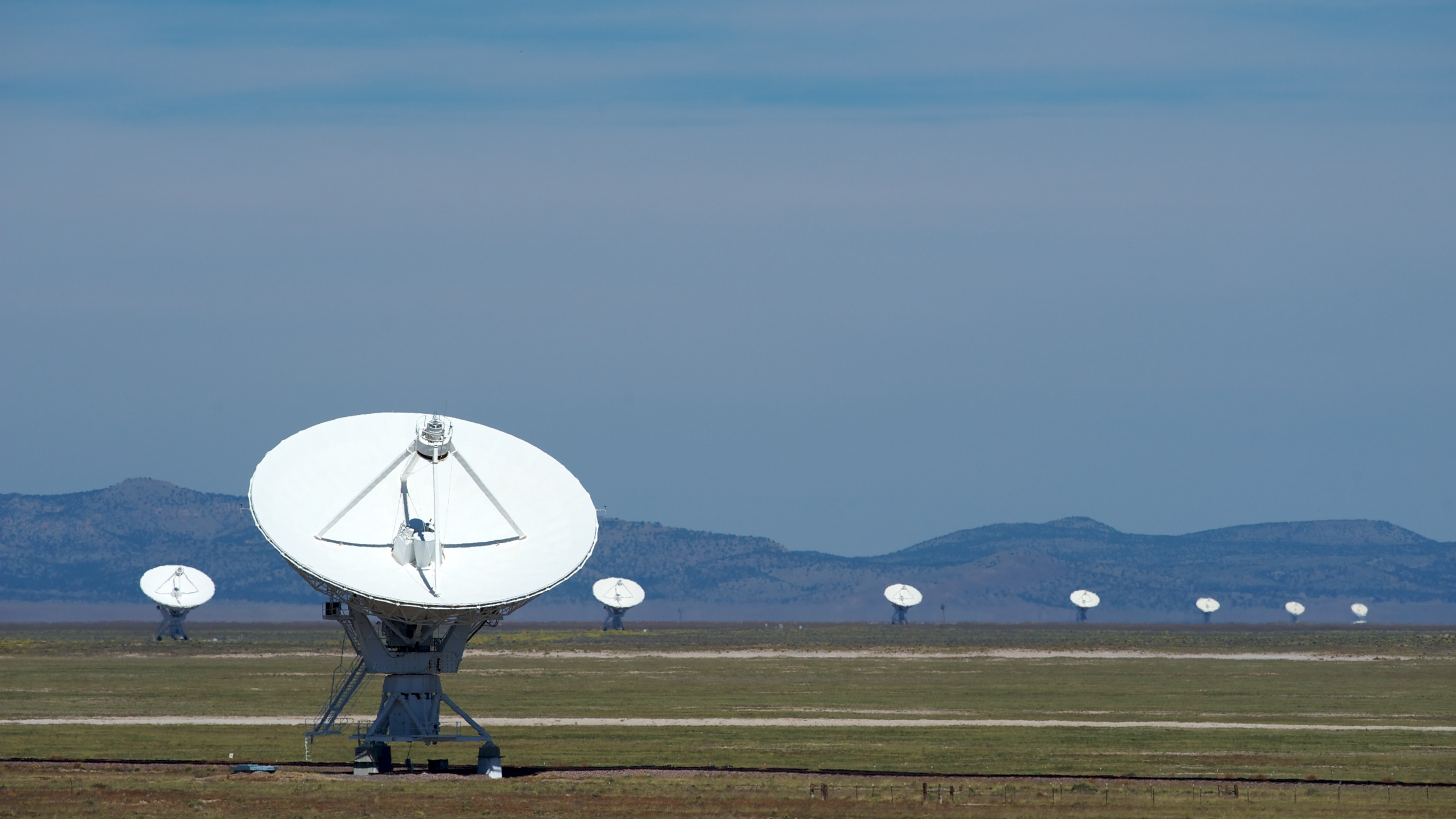
The Karl G. Jansky Very Large Array in Socorro County.

Socorro County (Spanish: Condado de Socorro) is a county in the U.S. state of New Mexico. As of the 2020 United States census, the population was 16,595. The county seat is Socorro. The county was formed in 1852 as one of the original nine counties of New Mexico Territory. Socorro was originally the name given to a Native American village (see: Puebloan peoples) by Don Juan de Oñate in 1598. Having received vitally needed food and assistance from the native population, Oñate named the pueblo Socorro ("succor" in English).

Socorro County is home to multiple scientific research institutions including New Mexico Institute of Mining and Technology, the National Radio Astronomy Observatory and its associated Very Large Array, the Magdalena Ridge Observatory, and the Langmuir Laboratory for Atmospheric Research. Federal public lands in Socorro County include parts of the Cibola National Forest, the Bosque del Apache National Wildlife Refuge, the Sevilleta National Wildlife Refuge, the Bureau of Land Management (BLM) Socorro Field Office, parts of the Salinas Pueblo Missions National Monument, and parts of the El Camino Real de Tierra Adentro National Historic Trail.

== History ==
Socorro County's history is intimately linked with the rich history of the surrounding area. Basham noted in his report documenting the archeological history of the Cibola National Forest's Magdalena Ranger District, which is almost entirely within Socorro County, that “[t]he heritage resources on the district are diverse and representative of nearly every prominent human evolutionary event known to anthropology. Evidence for human use of district lands date back 14,000 years to the Paleoindian period providing glimpses into the peopling of the New World and megafaunal extinction.“ Much of the now Magdalena Ranger District were a province of the Apache. Bands of Apache effectively controlled the Magdalena-Datil region from the seventeenth century until they were defeated in the Apache Wars in the late nineteenth century.

Outlaw renegades Butch Cassidy and the Wild Bunch and notorious Apaches like Cochise and Geronimo have ties to Socorro County's San Mateo Mountains. Vicks Peak was named after Victorio, “a Mimbreño Apache leader whose territory included much of the south and southwest New Mexico.” Famous for defying relocation orders in 1879 and leading his warriors “on a two-year reign of terror before he was killed,” Victorio is at least as highly regarded as Geronimo or Cochise among Apaches. Perhaps most famous outlaw was the Apache Kid whose supposed grave lies within the Apache Kid Wilderness. Stories of depredations by the Apache Kid, and of his demise, became so common and dramatic that in southwestern folklore they may be exceeded only by tales of lost Spanish gold. Native Americans lingered in the San Mateos well into the 1900s according to an essay written by Aldo Leopold in 1919 in which he documents stumbling upon the remains of a recently abandoned Indian hunting camp.

Cultural or Historic Figures with Ties to Socorro County

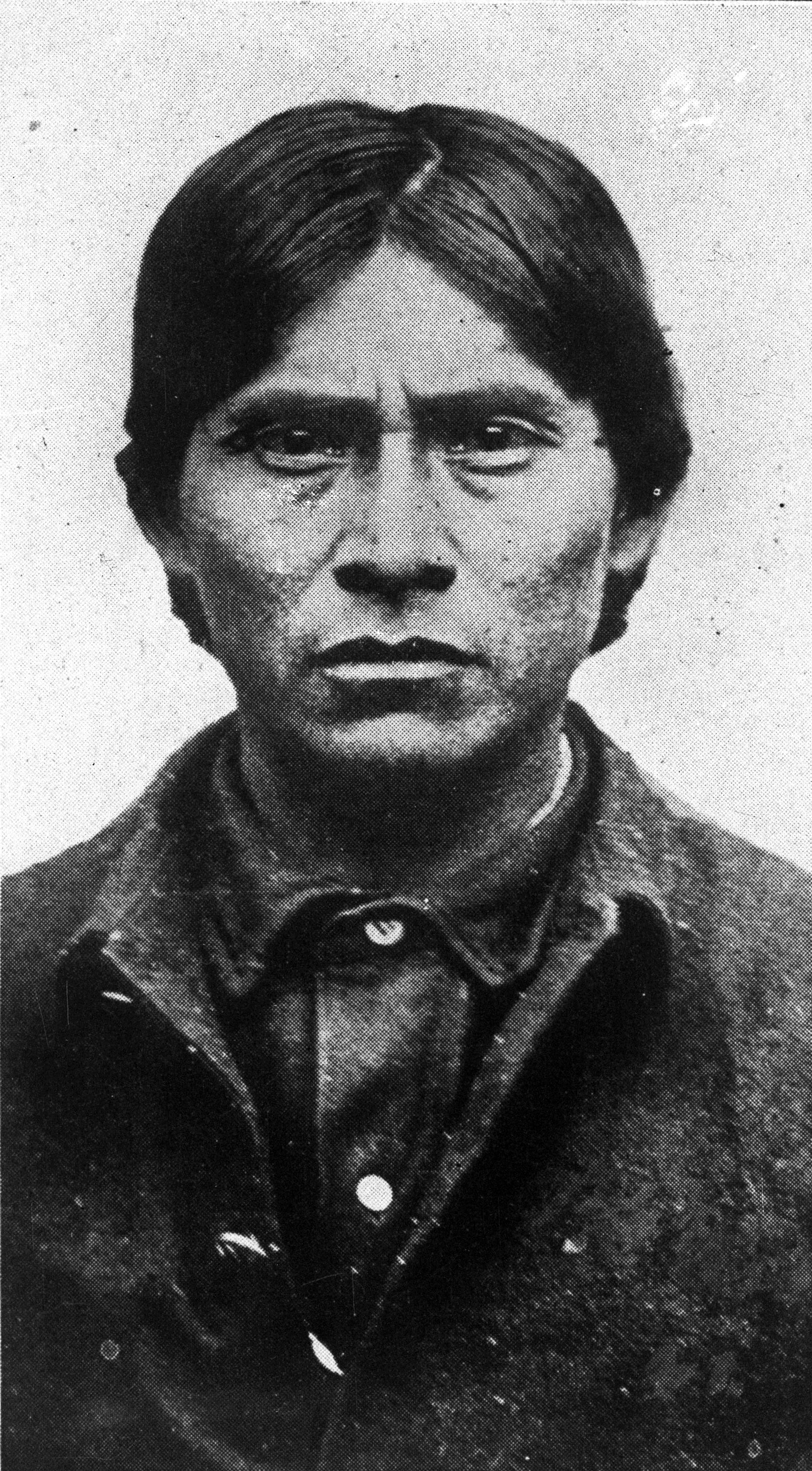
The Apache Kid is the namesake for a Wilderness area in the Cibola National Forest.

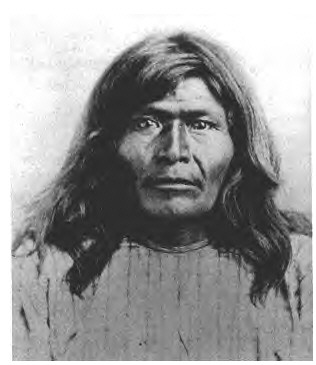
Vicks Peak in the San Mateo Mountains is named for Victorio, an Apache warrior and chief.

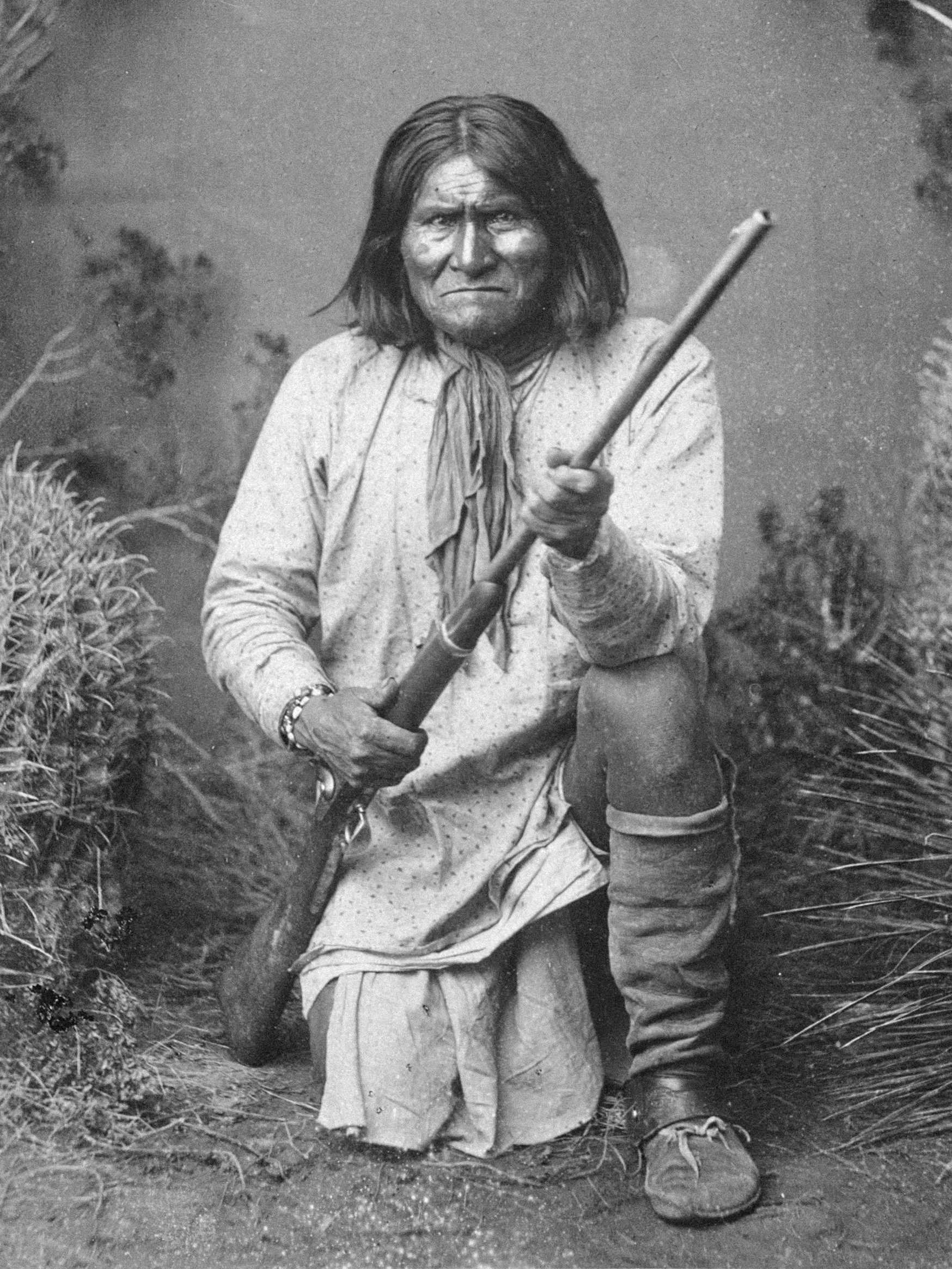
Geronimo (Goyaałé), a Bedonkohe Apache; kneeling with rifle, 1887.

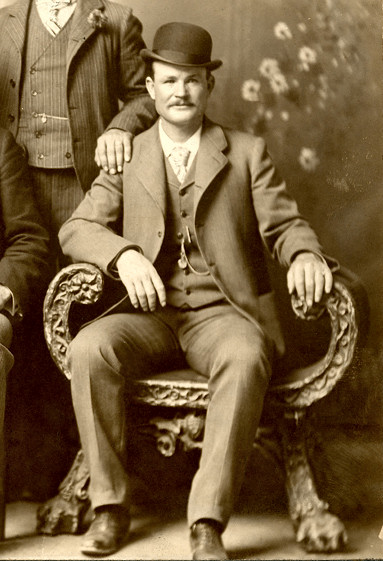
Butch Cassidy poses in the Wild Bunch group photo, Fort Worth, Texas, 1901.

A mining rush followed the Apache wars – gold, silver, and copper were found in the mountains. It wasn't until this time that extensive use of the area by non-Native Americans occurred. While some mining activity, involving gold, silver, and copper, occurred in the southern part of the range near the end of the nineteenth century, the prospecting/mining remnants are barely visible today due to collapse, topographic screening, and vegetation regrowth. While miners combed the mountains for mineral riches during the late nineteenth and early twentieth centuries, stockmen drove tens of thousands of sheep and cattle to stockyards at the village of Magdalena, then linked by rail with Socorro. In fact, the last regularly used cattle trail in the United States stretched 125 miles westward from Magdalena. The route was formally known as the Magdalena Livestock Driveway, but more popularly known to cowboys and cattlemen as the Beefsteak Trail. The trail began use in 1865 and its peak was in 1919. The trail was used continually until trailing gave way to trucking and the trail officially closed in 1971.

The first test of a nuclear bomb was conducted at the Trinity site in southeastern Socorro county on July 16, 1945.

== Geography ==
According to the U.S. Census Bureau, the county has a total area of 6,649 square miles (17,220 km^{2}), of which 6,647 square miles (17,220 km^{2}) is land and 2.1 square miles (5.4 km^{2}) (0.03%) is water. It is the second-largest county in New Mexico by area, after Catron County.

Socorro County ranges in elevation from approximately 4,528 ft (1,380 m) on the banks of the Rio Grande to 10,784 ft (3,287 m) at the top of South Baldy peak in the Magdalena Mountains. The southern portion of the Rocky Mountains extend into New Mexico and Socorro County. There are several mountain ranges that spread throughout the county. The Forest Service manages portions of four mountain ranges: the Bear, Datil, Magdalena, and San Mateo Mountains. Most of the land that comprises these mountains are within the Cibola National Forest. These ranges, as well as Ladron Peak located in Socorro County, are classified as sky islands.

=== Adjacent counties ===
- Cibola County – northwest
- Valencia County – north
- Torrance County – northeast
- Lincoln County – east
- Sierra County – south
- Catron County – west

=== National protected areas ===
- Bosque del Apache National Wildlife Refuge
- Sevilleta National Wildlife Refuge
- Cibola National Forest (part)
- National System of Public Lands managed by the BLM’s Socorro Field Office (part)
- El Camino Real de Tierra Adentro National Historic Trail (part)
- Salinas Pueblo Missions National Monument (part)

== Demographics ==
Historical population
Census	Pop.	Note	%±
1860	5,787		—
1870	6,603		14.1%
1880	7,875		19.3%
1890	9,595		21.8%
1900	12,195		27.1%
1910	14,761		21.0%
1920	14,061		−4.7%
1930	9,611		−31.6%
1940	11,422		18.8%
1950	9,670		−15.3%
1960	10,168		5.1%
1970	9,763		−4.0%
1980	12,566		28.7%
1990	14,764		17.5%
2000	18,078		22.4%
2010	17,866		−1.2%
2020	16,595		−7.1%
2025 (est.)	15,838	▼	−4.6%
U.S. Decennial Census; 1790-1960 1900–1990; 1990-2000 2010

=== 2020 census ===
As of the 2020 census, the county had a population of 16,595. The median age was 38.6 years. 21.2% of residents were under the age of 18 and 19.5% of residents were 65 years of age or older. For every 100 females there were 106.3 males, and for every 100 females age 18 and over there were 106.1 males age 18 and over.

Socorro County, New Mexico – Racial and ethnic composition Note: the US Census treats Hispanic/Latino as an ethnic category. This table excludes Latinos from the racial categories and assigns them to a separate category. Hispanics/Latinos may be of any race.
Race / Ethnicity (NH = Non-Hispanic)	Pop 2000	Pop 2010	Pop 2020	% 2000	% 2010	% 2020
White alone (NH)	6,796	6,711	5,361	37.59%	37.56%	32.30%
Black or African American alone (NH)	91	142	121	0.50%	0.79%	0.73%
Native American or Alaska Native alone (NH)	1,855	1,890	1,946	10.26%	10.58%	11.73%
Asian alone (NH)	198	208	295	1.10%	1.16%	1.78%
Pacific Islander alone (NH)	9	4	8	0.05%	0.02%	0.05%
Other race alone (NH)	63	50	75	0.35%	0.28%	0.45%
Mixed race or Multiracial (NH)	256	197	436	1.42%	1.10%	2.63%
Hispanic or Latino (any race)	8,810	8,664	8,353	48.73%	48.49%	50.33%
Total	18,078	17,866	16,595	100.00%	100.00%	100.00%

The racial makeup of the county was 48.8% White, 1.1% Black or African American, 13.2% American Indian and Alaska Native, 1.9% Asian, 0.0% Native Hawaiian and Pacific Islander, 15.8% from some other race, and 19.2% from two or more races. Hispanic or Latino residents of any race comprised 50.3% of the population.

48.9% of residents lived in urban areas, while 51.1% lived in rural areas.

There were 6,471 households in the county, of which 27.9% had children under the age of 18 living with them and 29.4% had a female householder with no spouse or partner present. About 33.8% of all households were made up of individuals and 14.0% had someone living alone who was 65 years of age or older.

There were 7,573 housing units, of which 14.6% were vacant. Among occupied housing units, 68.1% were owner-occupied and 31.9% were renter-occupied. The homeowner vacancy rate was 1.8% and the rental vacancy rate was 10.7%.

=== 2010 census ===
As of the 2010 census, there were 17,866 people, 7,014 households, and 4,349 families residing in the county. The population density was 2.7 inhabitants per square mile (1.0/km^{2}). There were 8,059 housing units at an average density of 1.2 per square mile (0.46/km^{2}). The racial makeup of the county was 75.1% white, 11.7% American Indian, 1.2% Asian, 1.1% black or African American, 8.1% from other races, and 2.8% from two or more races. Those of Hispanic or Latino origin made up 48.5% of the population. In terms of ancestry, 7.1% were English, 6.8% were German, and 4.2% were American.

Of the 7,014 households, 30.4% had children under the age of 18 living with them, 43.1% were married couples living together, 12.9% had a female householder with no husband present, 38.% were non-families, and 30.8% of all households were made up of individuals. The average household size was 2.46 and the average family size was 3.09. The median age was 36.9 years.

The median income for a household in the county was $33,284 and the median income for a family was $41,964. Males had a median income of $40,295 versus $27,819 for females. The per capita income for the county was $17,801. About 22.7% of families and 26.8% of the population were below the poverty line, including 33.1% of those under age 18 and 19.0% of those age 65 or over.

=== 2000 census ===
As of the 2000 census, there were 18,078 people, 6,675 households, and 4,492 families residing in the county. The population density was 3 people per square mile (1.2 people/km^{2}). There were 7,808 housing units at an average density of 1 per square mile (0.39/km^{2}). The racial makeup of the county was 62.9% White, 0.6% Black or African American, 10.9% Native American, 1.1% Asian, 0.1% Pacific Islander, 20.1% from other races, and 4.3% from two or more races. 48.7% of the population were Hispanic or Latino of any race.

There were 6,675 households, out of which 33.8% had children under the age of 18 living with them, 48.4% were married couples living together, 13.3% had a female householder with no husband present, and 32.7% were non-families. 26.8% of all households were made up of individuals, and 8.2% had someone living alone who was 65 years of age or older. The average household size was 2.62 and the average family size was 3.20.

In the county, the population was spread out, with 28.4% under the age of 18, 12.6% from 18 to 24, 26.1% from 25 to 44, 22.0% from 45 to 64, and 10.9% who were 65 years of age or older. The median age was 32 years. For every 100 females there were 103.3 males. For every 100 females age 18 and over, there were 103.9 males.

The median income for a household in the county was $23,439, and the median income for a family was $29,544. Males had a median income of $28,490 versus $22,482 for females. The per capita income for the county was $12,826. About 24.1% of families and 31.7% of the population were below the poverty line, including 43.6% of those under age 18 and 24.3% of those age 65 or over.

== Politics ==
In the past, Socorro County had leaned toward the Democratic Party, though in recent elections, it has been shifting toward the Republican Party. The majority (51 percent) of voters registered in the 2012 General Election were Democrats, with the rest of registered voters breaking down as 30 percent Republican, 15 percent Declined To Say, and 3 percent Other. In 2012, Socorro County voted for President Obama 56 percent to 38 percent, with a trend of voting Democratic from 1992 through 2020. In 2024, Donald Trump carried the county with a narrow majority, the first time a Republican presidential candidate had done this since Bush in 1988.

United States presidential election results for Socorro County, New Mexico
Year	Republican		Democratic		Third party(ies)	
Year	No.	%	No.	%	No.	%
1912	960	41.25%	1,078	46.33%	289	12.42%
1916	1,954	55.29%	1,558	44.09%	22	0.62%
1920	3,150	63.16%	1,807	36.23%	30	0.60%
1924	2,332	62.32%	1,251	33.43%	159	4.25%
1928	1,940	55.32%	1,564	44.60%	3	0.09%
1932	1,931	43.51%	2,495	56.22%	12	0.27%
1936	2,530	50.37%	2,477	49.31%	16	0.32%
1940	2,703	52.01%	2,489	47.89%	5	0.10%
1944	2,030	50.75%	1,967	49.18%	3	0.08%
1948	2,139	56.32%	1,650	43.44%	9	0.24%
1952	2,224	55.52%	1,777	44.36%	5	0.12%
1956	2,365	61.57%	1,476	38.43%	0	0.00%
1960	1,796	43.51%	2,327	56.37%	5	0.12%
1964	1,774	42.43%	2,397	57.33%	10	0.24%
1968	2,230	52.07%	1,871	43.68%	182	4.25%
1972	2,658	56.19%	1,994	42.16%	78	1.65%
1976	2,265	45.86%	2,606	52.76%	68	1.38%
1980	2,685	49.52%	2,226	41.05%	511	9.42%
1984	3,403	56.27%	2,541	42.01%	104	1.72%
1988	3,114	50.09%	2,960	47.61%	143	2.30%
1992	2,186	35.91%	2,908	47.77%	994	16.33%
1996	2,315	36.38%	3,374	53.02%	675	10.61%
2000	3,173	46.48%	3,294	48.26%	359	5.26%
2004	3,696	47.08%	4,025	51.27%	130	1.66%
2008	3,032	38.40%	4,696	59.48%	167	2.12%
2012	2,722	37.84%	4,058	56.42%	413	5.74%
2016	2,616	38.09%	3,313	48.24%	939	13.67%
2020	3,255	45.46%	3,722	51.98%	183	2.56%
2024	3,651	50.48%	3,384	46.79%	198	2.74%

Socorro County voted for Senator Heinrich (D) 53 percent to 43 percent in 2012. While Rep. Pearce (R) won Socorro County 52 percent to 48 percent in 2012, Socorro supported Democrats for the U.S. House in both 2008 and 2010 (with 50.2% and 63% Democratic, respectively). The County supported Governor Martinez (R) 53 percent to 47 percent in 2010 but went for Governor Richardson (D) in both 2002 and 2006. Socorro has supported Democratic state senators in Districts 28 and 30 for every election since 2000. In contrast, the county has supported a Republican state representative in District 49 since 2000. The current county commissioners of Socorro County are:

- Pauline Jaramillo, R-Dist. 1, Chair
- Martha Salas, R-Dist. 2, Vice Chair
- Manuel Anaya, D-Dist. 3
- Danny Monette, R-Dist. 4,
- Juan Gutierrez, R-Dist. 5

Socorro County backed Democratic gubernatorial nominee Michelle Lujan Grisham in 2018 by 57.4%, defeating Republican Steve Pearce by nearly 15 points in the county. However, in 2022, Republicans rebounded considerably and Grisham lost Socorro county to Republican Mark Ronchetti, by a margin of just 38 votes (2,988 votes to 2,950 respectively). It was the only county in the state to flip Republican that year, even as Grisham handedly won re-election statewide.

== Ecology, recreation and tourism ==
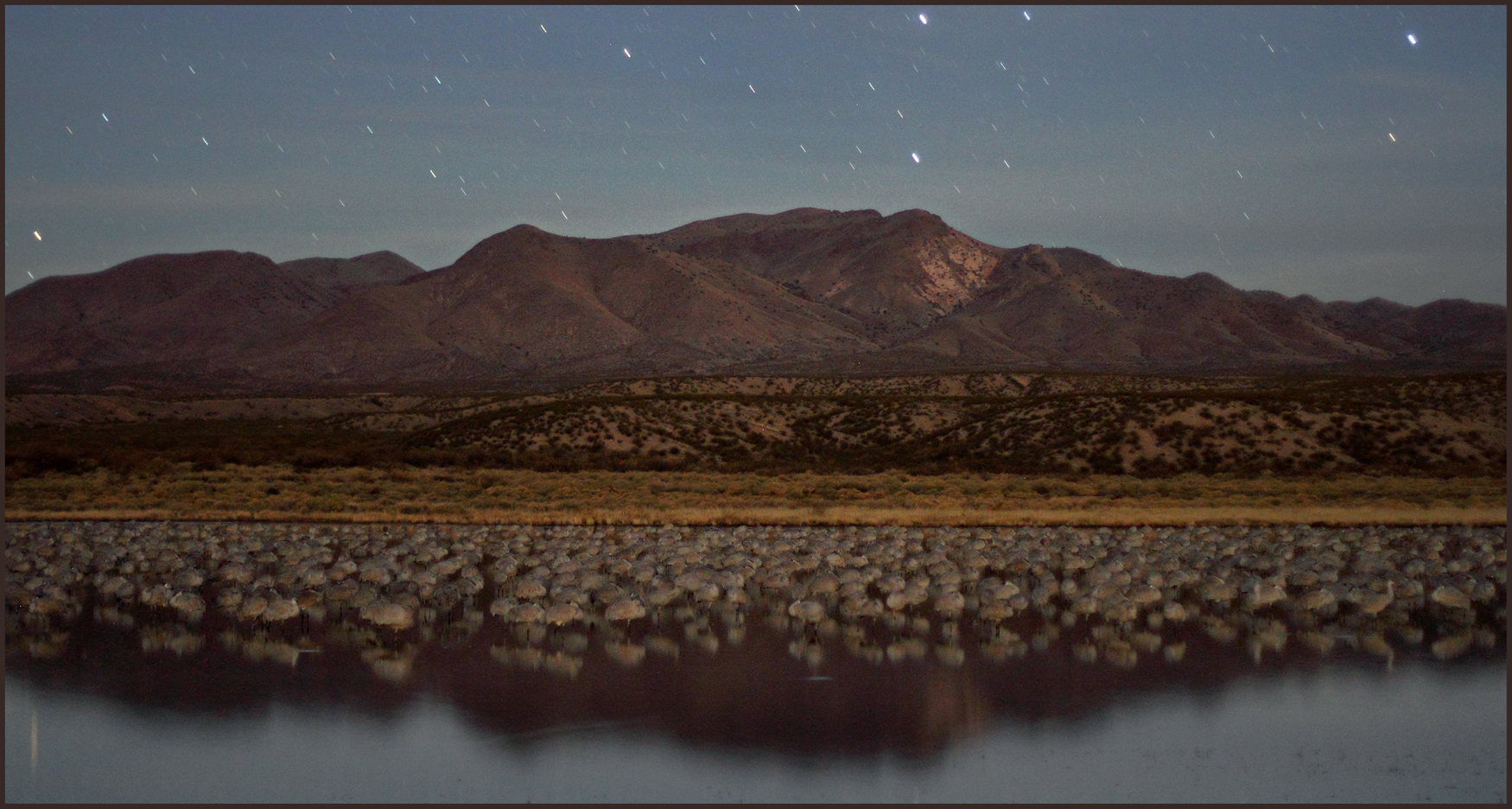
Sandhill cranes sleep under a starry sky at Bosque del Apache National Wildlife Refuge.

With multiple mountain ranges, extents of grasslands and marshes providing a wide array of available habitats, Socorro County is home to an extensive variety of ecosystems and wildlife. Socorro County contains 826 species of wildlife, including 14 amphibians, 60 reptiles, 336 birds, and 96 mammals. Wildlife in the County includes coyote, deer, elk, pronghorn antelope, bighorn sheep, Barbary sheep, black bear, mountain lion, wild turkey, various furbearers, Mexican spotted owl, and quail.

There are three congressionally designated Wilderness areas located within Socorro County. The Apache Kid and the Withington Wilderness Areas are both located in the San Mateo Mountains within the Cibola National Forest's Magdalena Ranger District. The Bosque del Apache Wilderness comprises two separate sections, totaling 30,427 acres of the National Wildlife Refuge. There are an additional 172,143 acres of Forest Service Inventoried Roadless Areas and 159,891 acres of BLM Wilderness Study Areas in the county. These undeveloped areas, which have no roads, allow visitors to enjoy the natural environment, explore the outdoors and experience the area's wilderness.

The high mountains, remote canyons, pristine forests and diverse wildlife found on the area's national forests, national wildlife refuges, national monuments, and BLM's national system of public lands provide for phenomenal recreation opportunities, including picnicking, hiking, backpacking, wildlife viewing, horseback-riding, and hunting. In fact, the four biggest elk in New Mexico were bagged in Socorro county and the Datil Mountains. The two most popular recreational activities on the Cibola National Forest are hiking/walking and viewing natural features with 35% and 15% of visitors citing these as their main activities, respectively. The Bosque del Apache National Wildlife Refuge hosts the Festival of the Cranes every November, celebrating the arrival of sandhill cranes and other migratory birds. Rare whooping cranes are also found occasionally on the Bosque del Apache.

Wildlife in Socorro County, New Mexico

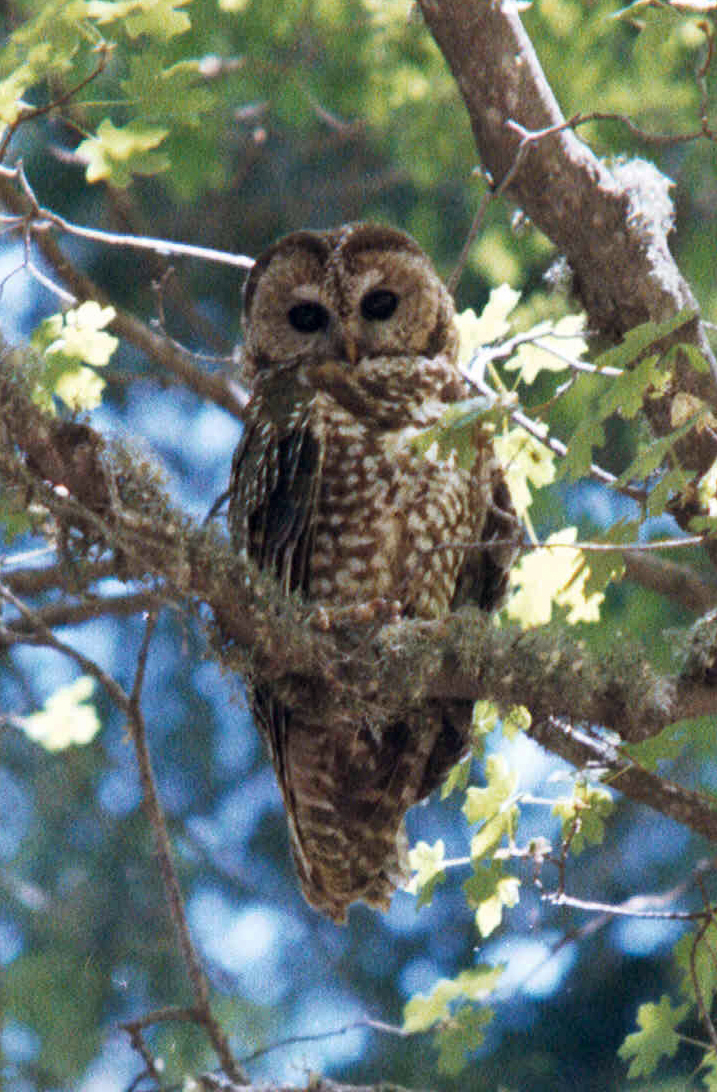
Socorro County contains thousands of acres of critical habitat for the threatened Mexican spotted owl.

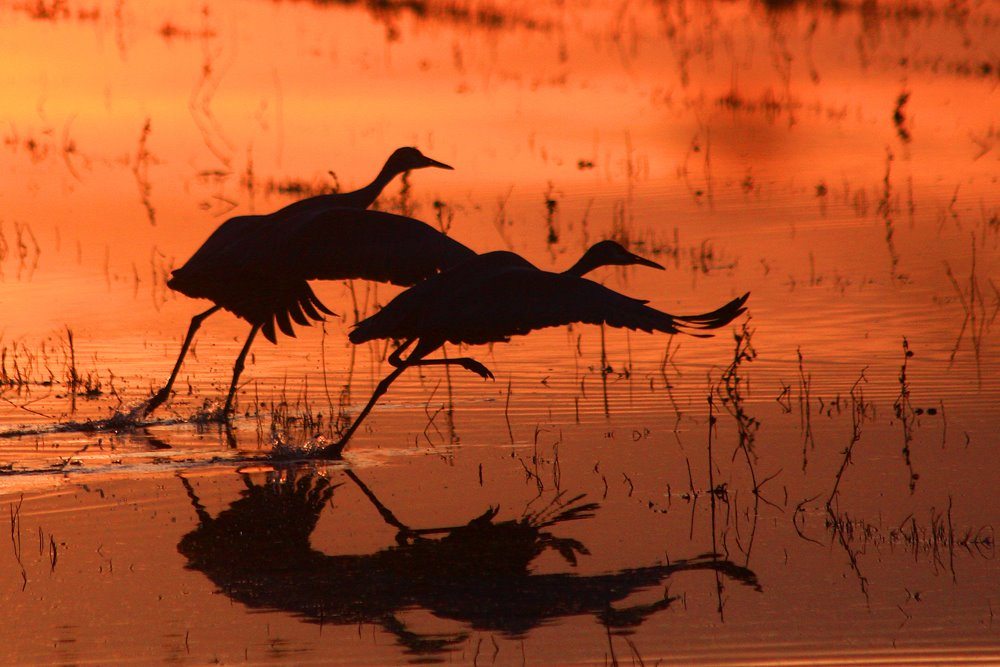
Sandhill cranes at Bosque del Apache National Wildlife Refuge during the Festival of the Cranes.

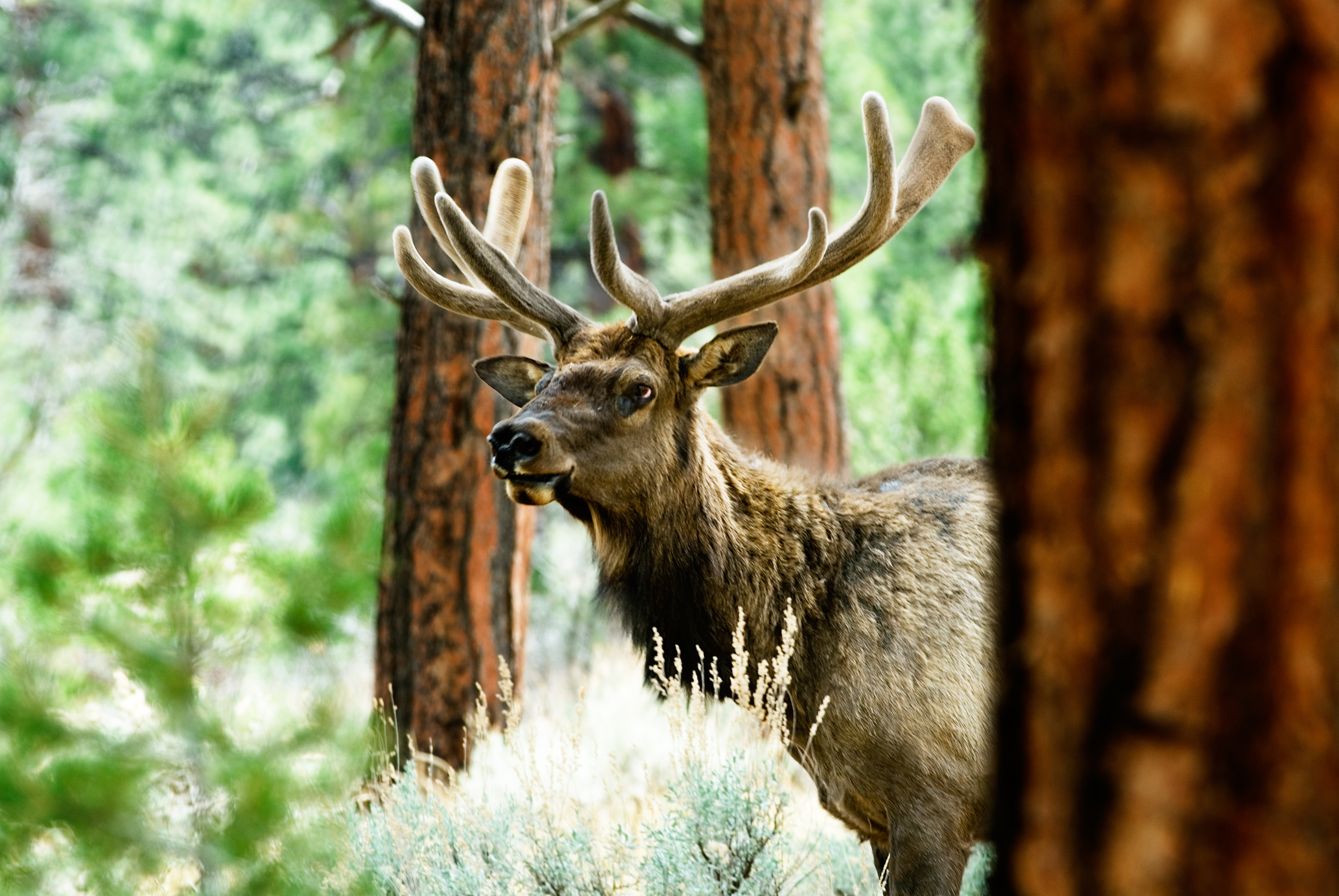
Socorro County is home to healthy populations of elk.

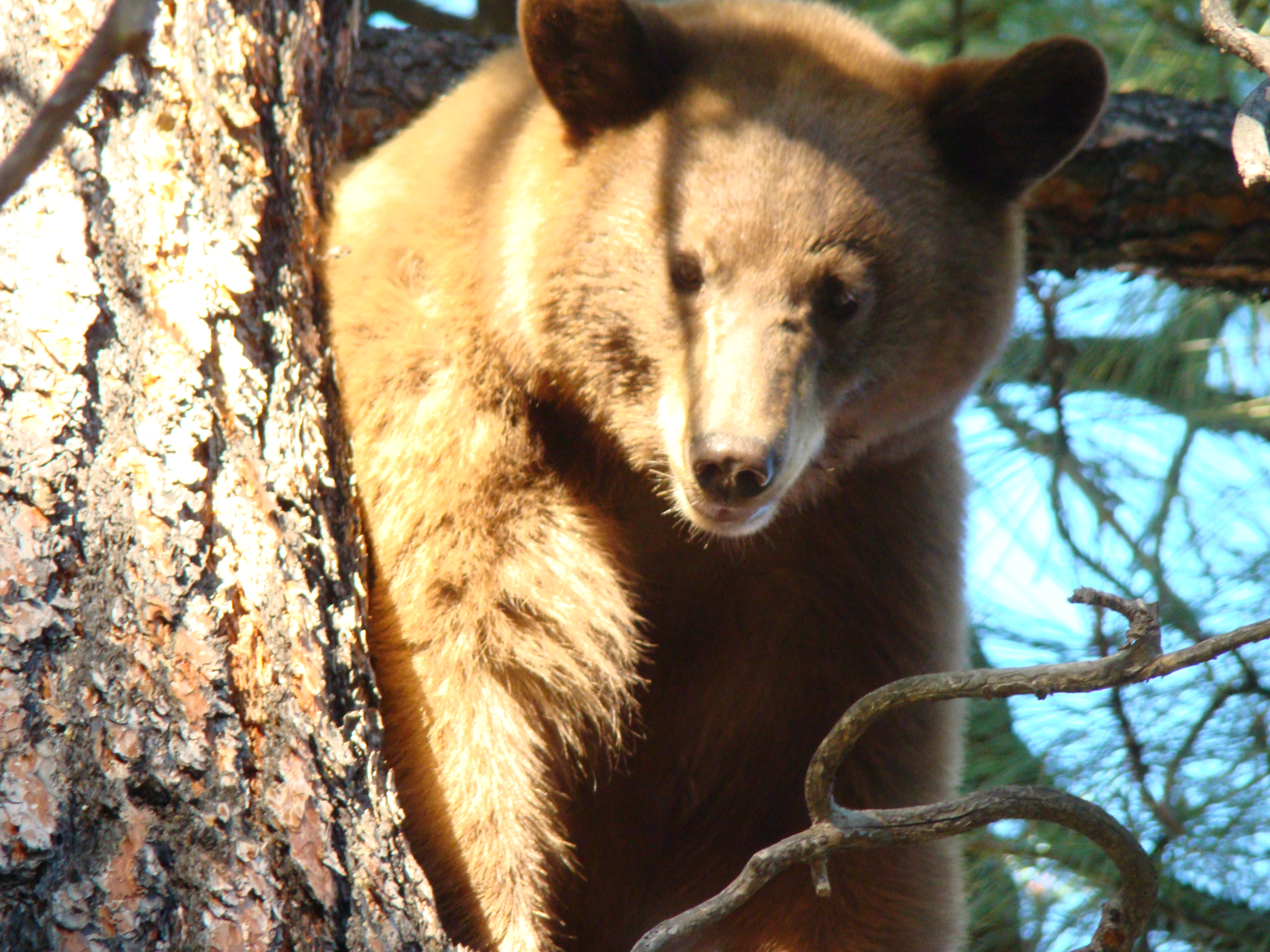
A black bear in the Cibola National Forest.

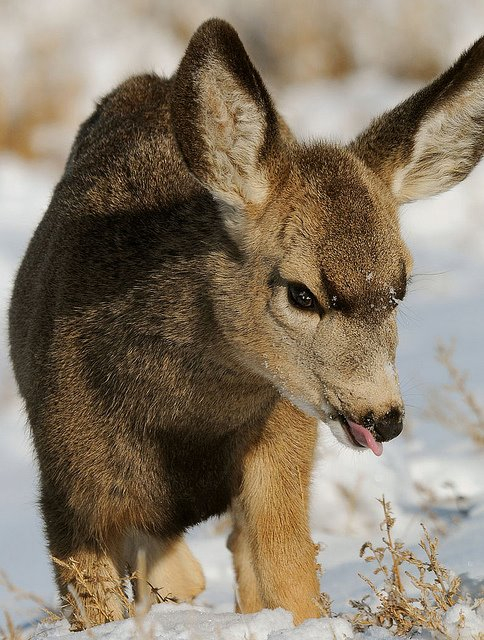
A mule deer fawn in the snow.

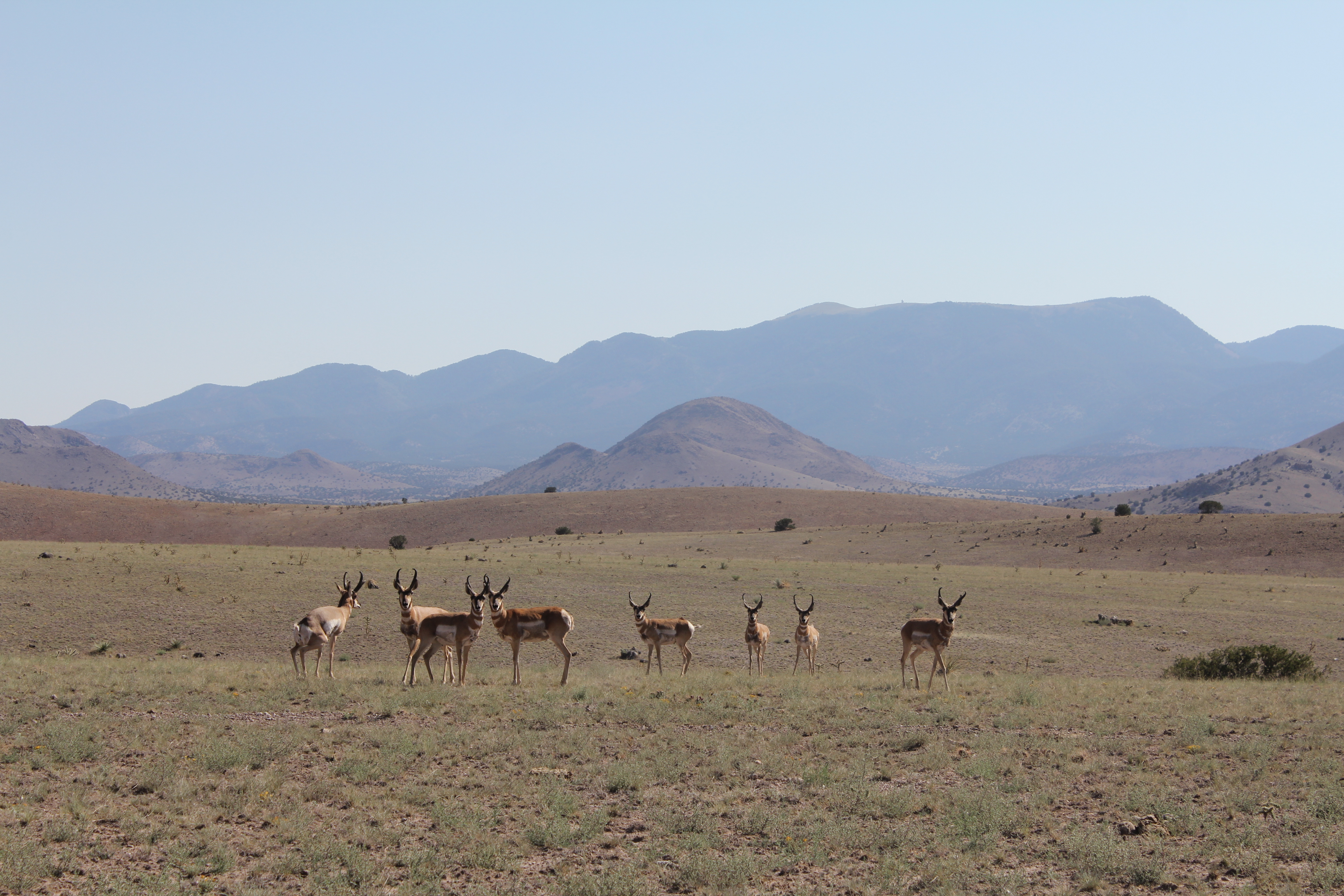
A pronghorn herd standing in front of the Magdalena Mountains.

The natural amenities in Socorro contribute to a strong tourism industry for the county. Visitors spent $47.4 million in Socorro County in 2011. Recreation alone accounted for more than $4 million in visitor spending in both 2010 and 2011. Tourism accounts for 8.8% of employment and 4.5% of labor income for the county. Additionally, tourism resulted in $7.7 million of total tax revenue, including $1.1 million in local tax revenue.

== Communities ==
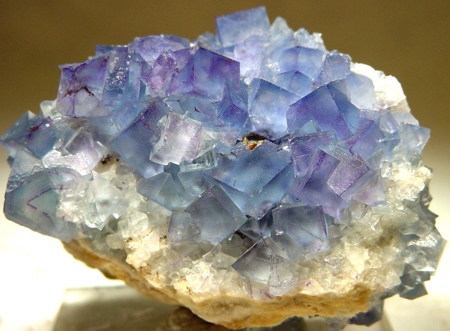
Fluorite from the Blanchard mine, near Bingham, New Mexico

=== City ===
- Socorro (county seat)

=== Village ===
- Magdalena

=== Census-designated places ===
- Abeytas
- Alamillo
- Alamo
- Chamizal
- Escondida
- La Joya
- Las Nutrias
- Lemitar
- Luis Lopez
- Polvadera
- San Acacia
- San Antonio
- San Antonito
- Veguita

=== Unincorporated communities ===
- Bernardo
- Claunch

=== Populated Places ===
- Bingham
- Sabinal

=== Ghost towns ===
- Adobe
- Alamillo Pueblo
- Bosquecito
- Canta Recio
- Carthage
- Contadero
- Council Rock
- Field
- Kelly
- Pueblito de la Parida
- Paraje
- Park City
- Pilabó
- Qualacu
- Riley
- Rosedale
- San Felipe
- San Marcial
- San Pascual Pueblo
- San Pedro
- Senecú
- Tajo
- Tokay
- Val Verde

== Education ==
School districts include:

- Belen Consolidated Schools
- Carrizozo Municipal Schools
- Corona Municipal Schools
- Magdalena Municipal Schools
- Mountainair Public Schools
- Socorro Consolidated Schools

== Transportation ==
=== Major highways ===
- I-25 / US 85 (unsigned)
  - I-25 BL (Socorro)
- US 60
- US 380
- NM 1
- NM 47
- NM 52
- NM 55
- NM 107
- NM 163
- NM 166
- NM 169
- NM 304
- NM 408
- NM 439
- NM 525

== See also ==
- National Register of Historic Places listings in Socorro County, New Mexico
- New Mexico Institute of Mining and Technology
- Trinity Site, the first test of an atomic bomb
  - Fallout from the Trinity nuclear test
- Very Large Array
- Cibola National Forest
- Bureau of Land Management
- Bosque del Apache National Wildlife Refuge
- Magdalena Ridge Observatory
- Langmuir Laboratory for Atmospheric Research
- Box Recreation Area
