= Ladron Peak =

Mountain in New Mexico, United States

Ladrón Peak

Highest point
- Elevation: 9,186 ft (2,800 m) NAVD 88
- Prominence: 3,130 ft (950 m)
- Coordinates: 34°26′05″N 107°05′06″W

Geography
- Location: Socorro County, New Mexico, U.S.
- Parent range: Sierra Ladrones

Climbing
- Easiest route: off-trail hike/scramble from west side

Ladrón Peak is an isolated, highly visible peak in central New Mexico, lying about 50 mi (80 km) southwest of Albuquerque. Ladron Peak is the only major peak in the compact range (really one large massif) known as the Sierra Ladrones, which lies between the Rio Puerco to the east and the Rio Salado to the southwest.

Despite its conical shape and its proximity to lava flows and small volcanoes, it is not itself a volcano, but an igneous intrusion. The core of the mountain is Precambrian granite. The peak rises dramatically from its surroundings on all sides; the summit is almost 4,500 feet (1,370 m) above the Rio Grande Valley, 10 miles (16 km) to the east.

The name of the peak means "thief", and "Sierra Ladrones" means "thieves' mountains." Navajo and Apache raiding parties, and later Hispanic and Anglo rustlers, used the mountains as hideouts, hence the name. Evidence of human occupation goes back over 10,000 years, and more recent prehistoric use occurred by the Mogollon and Ancestral Puebloan cultures. Today, part of the range is included in the Sevilleta National Wildlife Refuge, administered by the US Fish and Wildlife Service. The rest of the range is a mix of BLM and private land.

Ecologically, Ladrón Peak is a sky island, supporting vegetation and wildlife not found in the surrounding grasslands. It is high enough to have coniferous forests on its upper slopes. Animal species include mountain lion, bear, pronghorn, elk, deer and reintroduced desert bighorn sheep.
