= Sabinal, Socorro County, New Mexico =

Coordinates: 34°29′37″N 106°48′27″W

Sabinal, originally San Antonio de Sabinal, is a populated place in Socorro County, New Mexico, United States. It lies at an elevation of 4,793 feet (1,461 meters) on the west bank of the Rio Grande, approximately three miles north of Abeytas.

== History ==
San Antonio de Sabinal was founded in 1741 as one of several frontier settlements along a road that paralleled the Camino Real de Tierra Adentro along the west bank of the Rio Grande, south of Pueblo of Isleta.
