= Bosque del Apache National Wildlife Refuge =

Protected area in New Mexico, US

- IUCN category IV (habitat/species management area)
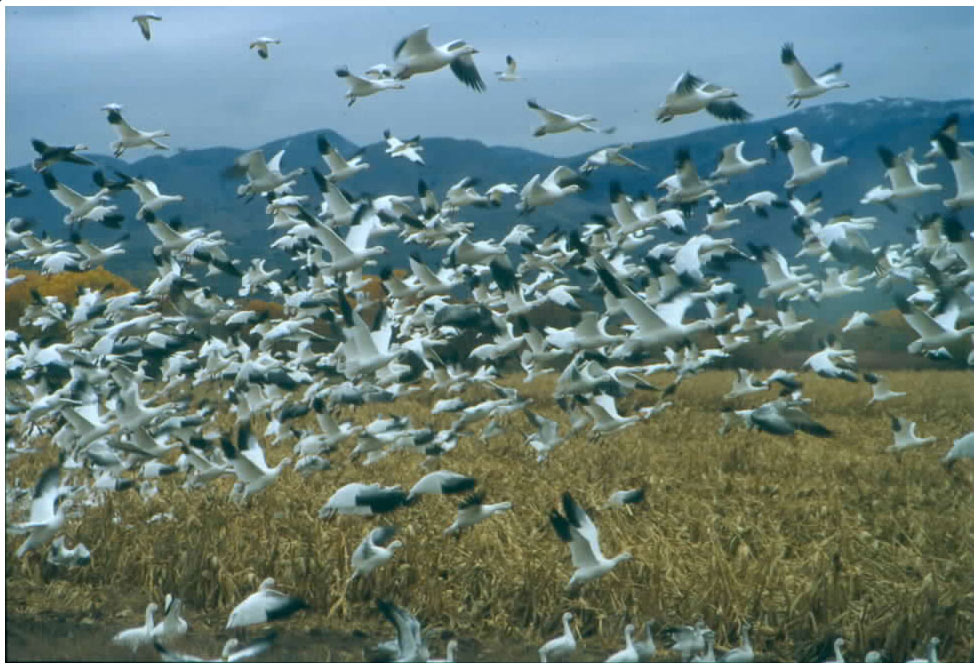
- Snow geese at Bosque del Apache

- Location within the United States
- Location: Socorro County, New Mexico, United States
- Nearest city: San Antonio, NM
- Coordinates: 33°52′9″N 106°50′35″W
- Area: 57,331 acres (232.01 km^{2})
- Established: 1939
- Visitors: 160,000 (in 2006)
- Governing body: U.S. Fish & Wildlife Service
- Website: Bosque del Apache National Wildlife Refuge

The Bosque del Apache National Wildlife Refuge (/ˈboʊskeɪ dɛl əˈpætʃi/ BOH-skay del ə-PATCH-ee, Spanish: [ˈboske ðel aˈpatʃe]; "Woodland of the Apache") is a national wildlife refuge located in southern New Mexico. It was founded in 1939 and is administered by the U.S. Fish and Wildlife Service. It is a favorite spot to observe sandhill cranes, which spend the fall and winter in the area. The reserve is open year-round and provides safe harbor for its varied wildlife. Visitors to the refuge also enjoy partaking in activities such as hiking, cycling, driving tours on the 12-mile scenic auto route, and participating in educational programs offered on site.

== Location ==
The name of the refuge means "woodland of the Apache" [sg] in Spanish, named for the Apache tribes that once camped in the forests along the Rio Grande. Previously, the Piro people had lived in the lands around what is now the refuge until the 1600s, when they were forced to abandon their pueblos due to European diseases and attacks from the Apache tribes.

The heart of the refuge comprises about 3,800 acres (15 km^{2}) of Rio Grande floodplain and 9,100 acres (37 km^{2}) of seasonal wetlands and other managed habitats. In addition, the refuge contains 44,300 acres (179 km^{2}) of arid grasslands and foothills of the Chupadera and San Pascual Mountains. About 30,000 acres (120 km^{2}) of this are designated as wilderness. The refuge sits within the Little San Pascual Mountain fault zone, rendering it an ideal site for conducting research on stratigraphy and sedimentology.

A 14-mile-long (22.5 km) loop road divided by a cutoff into a north loop and south loop allows drivers excellent views of wetland wildlife and raptors, with several short (0.5- to 2-mile) walking trails. The road affords good views of the seasonal wetlands, where numerous birds may be seen. Adjacent to the Visitor Center, a desert plant garden is maintained.

== Terrain ==
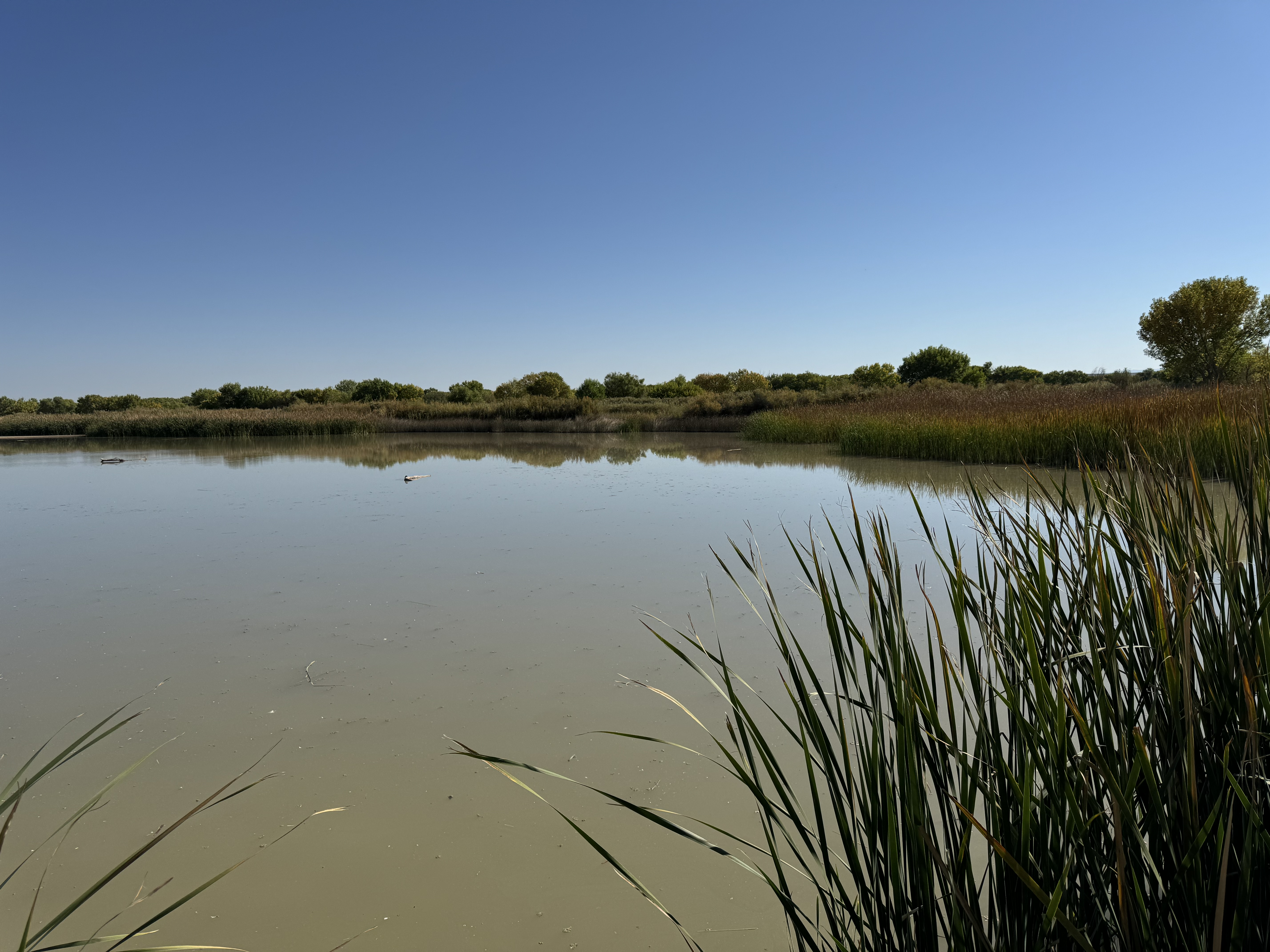
View from the Marsh Overlook Trail at Bosque del Apache, New Mexico

The center of the refuge is made up of seasonal wetlands watered by irrigation systems connected to the Rio Grande. These managed wetlands provide an essential habitat for cottonwood trees, Goodding's willow, and coyote willow. They are irrigated periodically to give these plants the best growing conditions.

The managed wetlands also grow plants that provide food for wintering waterbirds. These plants include smartweed, millet, bulrush, chufa, and various sedges. They are periodically irrigated through the summer to encourage plant growth and may be disturbed by fire or machinery to further enhance plant diversity. In the fall and winter, the wetlands are flooded to provide habitat for the arriving waterbirds.

Bosque del Apache National Wildlife Refuge is also made up of thousands of acres of dry land. The Chupadera Peak Wilderness Unit contains 5,440 acres (23 km^{2}) of scrubland and desert terrain connected to the Chihuahuan Desert. In addition to desert terrain, it is characterized by tall, reddish cliffs.

== Birds ==
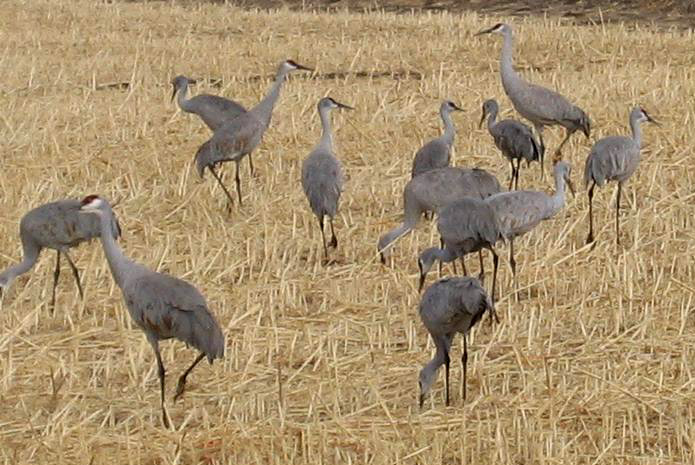
Sandhill cranes at Bosque del Apache

Some 408 different bird species have been observed in the refuge since 1964 according to eBird, making it one of the most diverse areas for bird species in the United States . Seasonal wetlands attract the huge flocks of wintering sandhill cranes and geese that are popular with visitors. Many other species—notably waterfowl, shorebirds, and birds of prey—also winter in the refuge. Striking vagrants such as a sungrebe and rufous-necked wood rail have been found there. The dry upland areas of the refuge are host to a unique suite of desert birds such as pyrrhuloxia and black-throated sparrows.

The diversity of birds is also high in spring, particularly the last week of April and first week of May, and in fall. In summer, the area is hot, but many riparian birds can be found, including such New Mexico rarities as the least bittern and common gallinule. Late November to mid-February is the best time for large numbers of birds, including thousands of sandhill cranes and over 10,000 Ross's and snow geese. An annual festival of the cranes is held in early December, as large numbers of cranes begin arriving in the refuge. Winter visitors often plan to be in the refuge at sunrise or sunset, when the flocks of cranes and geese that roost in the refuge "commute" to or from the local fields where they feed. Although winter sunsets and especially sunrises are chilly, the daily low temperature is seldom far below freezing. Visitors typically stay in the nearby recreational vehicle park or in Socorro or San Antonio.

Rare birds that nest on the refuge include the southwestern subspecies of the willow flycatcher and the western distinct population segment of the yellow-billed cuckoo, both of which are listed under the U.S. Endangered Species Act.

== Biology ==
In addition to hosting rare bird species, Bosque del Apache National Wildlife Refuge is also home to the last known population of the New Mexico meadow jumping mouse along the Rio Grande. This mouse is a distinctive, genetically unique subspecies found in certain regions of New Mexico, Arizona, and southern Colorado. Due to its rarity, the New Mexico meadow jumping mouse also has been listed as an endangered species under the Endangered Species Act.

An overabundance of the invasive shrubby trees tamarisk (also known as salt cedar) and Russian olive on the refuge have posed a threat to habitats used by native wildlife species. To combat this issue, the reserve has used various control methods over time, such as mechanical removal, herbicide application, and prescribed burning. The tamarisk removal efforts undertaken on the refuge have served as a case study for similar removal initiatives in other protected areas.

== Climate ==
According to the Köppen climate classification, Bosque del Apache National Wildlife Refuge has a cold, semiarid climate,BSk on climate maps. The hottest temperature recorded there was 113 °F (45.0 °C) on June 25, 1902, while the coldest temperature recorded was −19 °F (−28.3 °C) on January 11, 1962.

Climate data for Bosque del Apache National Wildlife Refuge, New Mexico, 1991–2020 normals, extremes 1894–present
Month	Jan	Feb	Mar	Apr	May	Jun	Jul	Aug	Sep	Oct	Nov	Dec	Year
Record high °F (°C)	80 (27)	90 (32)	97 (36)	100 (38)	107 (42)	113 (45)	112 (44)	110 (43)	106 (41)	102 (39)	89 (32)	79 (26)	113 (45)
Mean daily maximum °F (°C)	57.3 (14.1)	63.4 (17.4)	71.1 (21.7)	78.4 (25.8)	87.1 (30.6)	96.9 (36.1)	97.3 (36.3)	94.3 (34.6)	89.2 (31.8)	79.4 (26.3)	67.3 (19.6)	56.5 (13.6)	78.2 (25.7)
Daily mean °F (°C)	38.6 (3.7)	43.5 (6.4)	50.7 (10.4)	57.7 (14.3)	66.0 (18.9)	75.3 (24.1)	79.1 (26.2)	76.6 (24.8)	69.9 (21.1)	58.5 (14.7)	47.0 (8.3)	38.0 (3.3)	58.4 (14.7)
Mean daily minimum °F (°C)	19.8 (−6.8)	23.7 (−4.6)	30.2 (−1.0)	36.9 (2.7)	44.8 (7.1)	53.7 (12.1)	60.8 (16.0)	58.9 (14.9)	50.6 (10.3)	37.5 (3.1)	26.6 (−3.0)	19.5 (−6.9)	38.6 (3.7)
Record low °F (°C)	−19 (−28)	−16 (−27)	2 (−17)	11 (−12)	20 (−7)	31 (−1)	41 (5)	43 (6)	29 (−2)	12 (−11)	−10 (−23)	−8 (−22)	−19 (−28)
Average precipitation inches (mm)	0.38 (9.7)	0.43 (11)	0.40 (10)	0.33 (8.4)	0.42 (11)	0.53 (13)	1.67 (42)	1.91 (49)	1.31 (33)	0.90 (23)	0.59 (15)	0.75 (19)	9.62 (244.1)
Average snowfall inches (cm)	0.3 (0.76)	0.1 (0.25)	0.0 (0.0)	0.1 (0.25)	0.0 (0.0)	0.0 (0.0)	0.0 (0.0)	0.0 (0.0)	0.0 (0.0)	0.1 (0.25)	0.5 (1.3)	0.9 (2.3)	2.0 (5.1)
Average precipitation days (≥ 0.01 in)	2.3	2.5	2.3	1.9	3.3	3.2	7.8	8.8	5.5	4.5	2.7	2.9	47.7
Average snowy days (≥ 0.1 in)	0.5	0.2	0.0	0.1	0.0	0.0	0.0	0.0	0.0	0.0	0.1	0.4	1.3
Source 1: NOAA
Source 2: xmACIS2

== See also ==
- Rio Grande Trail
