= Sevilleta National Wildlife Refuge =

Wildlife refuge in New Mexico, United States

- IUCN category IV (habitat/species management area)
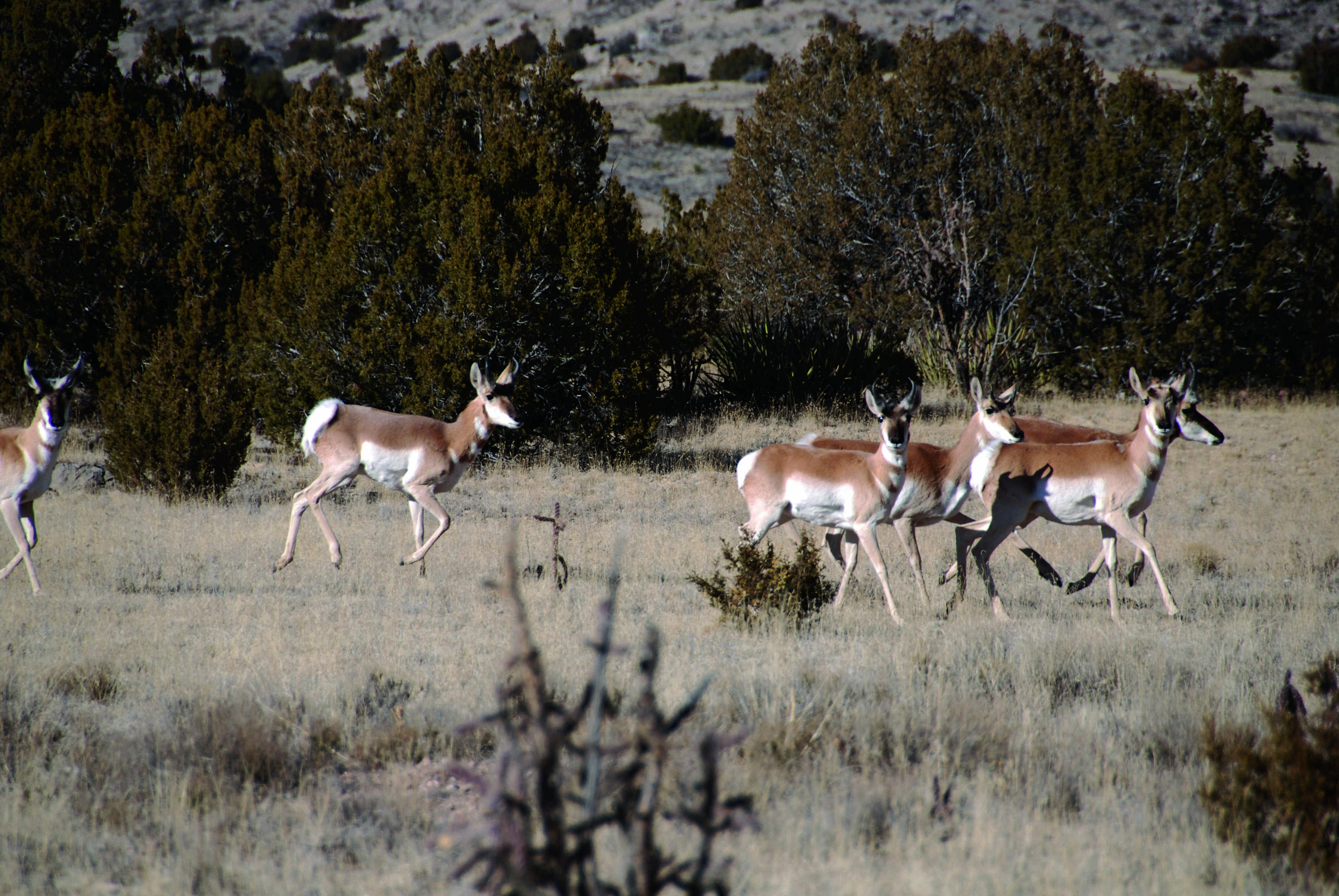
- A group of pronghorns frolicking

- Location within New Mexico Location within the United States
- Location: Socorro County, New Mexico, US
- Nearest city: Socorro, New Mexico
- Coordinates: 34°20′00″N 106°50′00″W
- Established: 1973
- Governing body: U.S. Fish & Wildlife Service
- Website: www.fws.gov/refuge/Sevilleta/

The Sevilleta National Wildlife Refuge is a protected area of New Mexico managed by the United States Fish and Wildlife Service as part of the National Wildlife Refuge System. It is located in the far northern fringes of the Chihuahuan Desert, 20 miles (30 km) north of Socorro, New Mexico. The Rio Salado and the Rio Grande flow through the refuge.

== History ==
The area that is now the Sevilleta National Wildlife Refuge was inhabited by the Piro Pueblo prior to Spanish arrival in 1598 in what is now the southwestern part of the United States. El Camino Real de Tierra Adentro, which passed through the area, was the main transportation route from Santa Fe, New Mexico, to Mexico City, Mexico.

In 1680, Governor Antonio de Otermin of Santa Fe retreated through the area to El Paso during the Pueblo Revolt. By this time, the Piro Pueblo, as well as many other Pueblos, were already abandoned due to Spaniard encroachment.

After the Piro were gone, the Spanish built a military post called "New Sevilla" on the site. This post became an important stop on El Camino Real and was at various times named "Joya de Sevilleta" and "La Jolla",.

The Sevilleta de la Joya Land Grant was given to the people of Sevilleta by the Governor of New Mexico prior to Mexican independence from Spain in 1821. The area passed from Mexican to United States control as a result of the Mexican–American War.

Socorro county bought this land in a public sale in 1928, because taxes on land could not be paid by the community that owned the land grant. In 1936, General Thomas Campbell bought this land from Socorro County and used it as a cattle ranch. In 1966, shortly before his death, Campbell established a foundation that eventually decided to preserve the land of Sevilleta by creating a wildlife refuge. In 1973 the foundation gave the land to The Nature Conservancy, which in turn gave it to the U.S. Fish and Wildlife Service. On December 28, 1973, the 230,000 acres (930 km^{2}) Sevilleta National Wildlife Refuge was established.

Four major biomes unite in Sevilleta: Pinon-Juniper Woodlands, Colorado Plateau Shrub-Steppe, Chihuahuan Desert, and Great Plains Grasslands.

== Long Term Ecological Research Program ==
The refuge currently hosts the Sevilleta Long Term Ecological Research (LTER) Program, conducted by the University of New Mexico. This program has produced a number of studies documenting and characterizing the ecology and microbiota of the refuge.

== Facilities ==
The Sevilleta National Wildlife Refuge has some areas set aside for scientific research, and permits to conduct research are available. Limited hunting of doves and waterfowl is permitted. Most, but not all, of the refuge is off limits to the public and its development is left to nature. Use such as hiking and photography are permitted in some areas. There are over seven miles of trails open sunrise to sunset. Picnicking and camping are not permitted anywhere in the refuge.

== Endangered species ==
The endangered southwestern willow flycatcher migrates to the refuge from Mexico and Central America from May to September. The refuge also hosts critical habitat for the threatened southwestern yellow-billed cuckoo and endangered Rio Grande silvery minnow.
