= Socorro, New Mexico =

- City
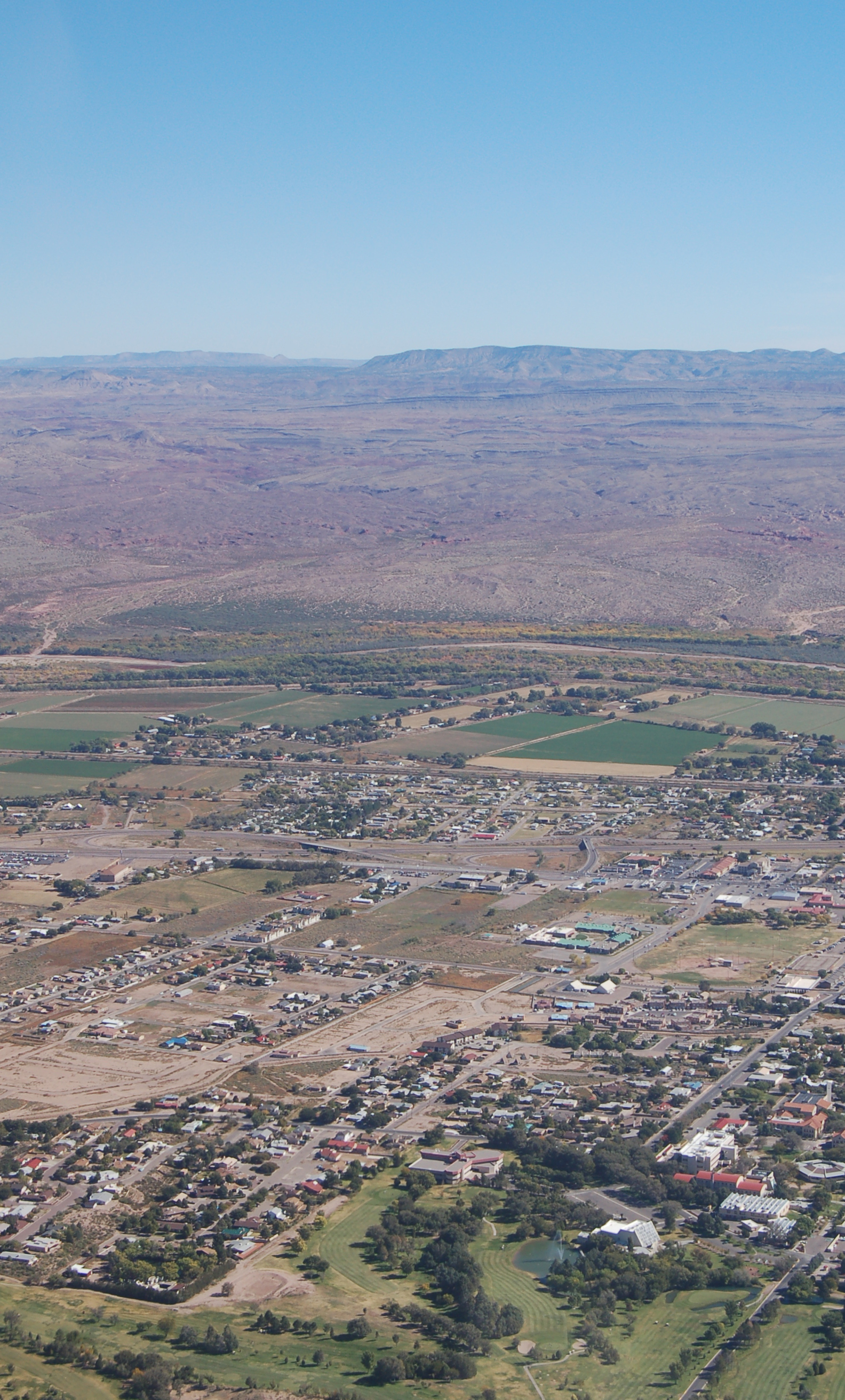
- Socorro aerial view

- Location of Socorro in Socorro County, New Mexico

- Location in the United States
- Coordinates: 34°03′05″N 106°53′18″W
- Country: United States
- State: New Mexico
- County: Socorro

Government
  - Mayor: Ravi Bhasker

Area
  - Total: 14.46 sq mi (37.46 km^{2})
  - Land: 14.45 sq mi (37.43 km^{2})
  - Water: 0.012 sq mi (0.03 km^{2})
- Elevation: 4,675 ft (1,425 m)

Population (2020)
  - Total: 8,707
  - Density: 602.4/sq mi (232.59/km^{2})
- Time zone: UTC−07:00 (Mountain (MST))
  - Summer (DST): UTC−06:00 (MDT)
- ZIP Code: 87801
- Area code: 575
- FIPS code: 35-73540
- GNIS feature ID: 2411919
- Website: socorronm.gov

Socorro (/səˈkɔːroʊ/, sə-KOR-oh) is a city in Socorro County in the U.S. state of New Mexico. It is in the Rio Grande Valley at an elevation of 4,579 feet (1,396 m). At the 2020 census, the population was 8,707. It is the county seat of Socorro County. Socorro is located 74 miles (119 km) south of Albuquerque and 146 miles (235 km) north of Las Cruces.

== History ==
=== Founding ===
In June 1598, Juan de Oñate led a group of Spanish settlers through the Jornada del Muerto, an inhospitable patch of desert that ends just south of the present-day city of Socorro. As the Spaniards emerged from the desert, Piro Indians of the pueblo of Teypana gave them food and water. Therefore, the Spaniards renamed this pueblo Socorro, which means "help" or "aid". Later, the name "Socorro" would be applied to the nearby Piro pueblo of Pilabó.

Nuestra Señora de Perpetuo Socorro, the first Catholic mission in the area, was probably established c. 1626. Fray Agustín de Vetancurt would later write that around 600 people lived in the area during this period. Mines in the Socorro mountains were opened by 1626.

During the Pueblo Revolt of 1680, Spanish refugees stopped in the pueblo of Socorro before continuing south, out of the province, to safety. A number of Piro Indians followed them. The withdrawal of Spanish soldiers left Socorro and its Piro inhabitants vulnerable to attack by soldiers from Apache bands and other tribes. By 1692 the settlement was in ruins.

The Spanish did not initially resettle Socorro when they re-conquered New Mexico. Other than El Paso, there were no Spanish settlements south of Sabinal (which is approximately 30 miles (48 km) north of Socorro) until the 1800s. In 1800, Governor Fernando Chacón gave the order to resettle Socorro and other villages in the area. However, Socorro was not resettled until about 1815. In 1817, 70 Belen residents petitioned the crown for land in Socorro. The 1833 Socorro census lists over 400 residents, with a total of 1,774 people living within the vicinity of the village.

The mission of San Miguel de Socorro was established soon after Socorro was resettled. The church was built on the ruins of the old Nuestra Señora de Socorro.

=== Territorial period ===
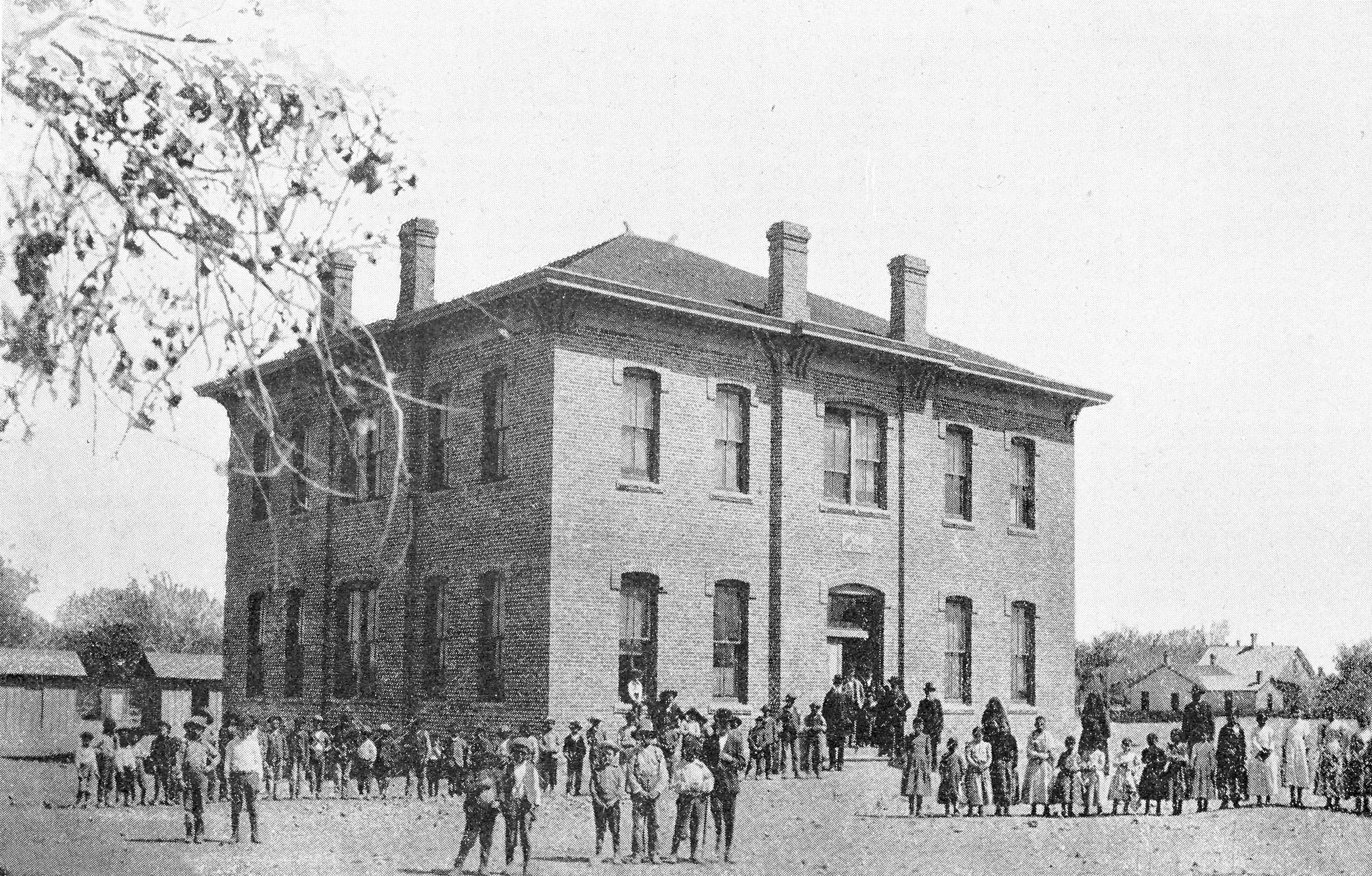
Public school in Socorro (1898)

In August 1846, during the Mexican–American War, New Mexico was occupied by the American Army. In Las Vegas, New Mexico, Colonel Stephen W. Kearny proclaimed New Mexico's independence from Mexico. On their way to begin their assault on Mexico, American troops stopped in Socorro. A British officer, Lt. George Ruxton, commented that these soldiers were "unwashed and unshaven, were ragged and dirty, without uniforms..." and were lacking in discipline.

In September 1850, New Mexico became a territory of the United States. At the time, New Mexico encompassed what is now the states of New Mexico and Arizona. In 1850, the population of Socorro was only 543 people. This included 100 American soldiers who were soon moved to Valverde.

The first military post built near Socorro was Fort Conrad, 30 miles (48 km) south of the town. Built in August 1851, the fort was badly constructed and was abandoned for Fort Craig, located a few miles away. Fort Craig was first occupied on March 31, 1854. After the 1862 Battle of Valverde, two Texas fatalities from the battle were buried in Socorro. Other Socorro military operations, led bu Captain James "Paddy" Graydon, occurred, including a ruse and "army of one soldier."

The New Mexico and Southern Pacific Railroad (a subsidiary of the Atchison, Topeka and Santa Fe) arrived in July 1880, as it built south through the Rio Grande valley on its way toward El Paso. Its presence contributed to growth of the community, as Socorro also became a center of mining activity of lead and zinc: Between 1876 and 1890, this was one of the richest mining areas in the country.

=== Modern era ===
The New Mexico School of Mines (now the New Mexico Institute of Mining and Technology) was founded in Socorro in 1889.

On April 24, 1964, Lonnie Zamora, a local policeman, claimed to have observed a flying saucer and two little beings. Zamora's claim is known as the Lonnie Zamora incident.

== Geography and geology ==
"M" Mountain, west of Socorro

Socorro is located 75 miles (121 km) south of Albuquerque, at an average elevation of 4,605 feet (1,404 m). The town lies adjacent to the Rio Grande in a landscape dominated by the Rio Grande rift and numerous extinct volcanoes. The immediate region encompasses approximately 6,000 feet (1,800 m) of vertical relief between the Rio Grande and the Magdalena Mountains. Notable nearby locales include the Cibola National Forest, the Bureau of Land Management Quebradas Scenic Backcountry Byway, and the Bosque del Apache and Sevilleta National Wildlife Refuges. According to the United States Census Bureau, the city has a total area of 14.4 square miles (37 km^{2}), of which 0.04 square miles (0.10 km^{2}), or 0.21%, is water.

=== Climate ===
Socorro has a cold semi-arid climate (BSk). Summers are hot, reaching 90 °F (32 °C) on an average of 82 days annually. Winters are mild, but nights are cold with 126 days falling to or below freezing per year. The record high temperature of 109 °F (43 °C) was recorded on June 26, 1994, while the record low of −16 °F (−27 °C) was recorded on December 21, 1909.

Socorro averages 10.05 inches (255 mm) of annual precipitation, with a peak of 2.43 inches (62 mm) in July.

Climate data for Socorro, New Mexico, 1991–2020 normals, extremes 1893–present
Month	Jan	Feb	Mar	Apr	May	Jun	Jul	Aug	Sep	Oct	Nov	Dec	Year
Record high °F (°C)	76 (24)	82 (28)	91 (33)	95 (35)	102 (39)	109 (43)	108 (42)	106 (41)	102 (39)	95 (35)	86 (30)	81 (27)	109 (43)
Mean maximum °F (°C)	65.4 (18.6)	72.3 (22.4)	81.3 (27.4)	87.0 (30.6)	93.8 (34.3)	100.5 (38.1)	100.9 (38.3)	97.7 (36.5)	93.4 (34.1)	85.7 (29.8)	75.0 (23.9)	66.2 (19.0)	101.4 (38.6)
Mean daily maximum °F (°C)	52.2 (11.2)	59.2 (15.1)	67.4 (19.7)	74.7 (23.7)	82.7 (28.2)	91.2 (32.9)	91.5 (33.1)	88.9 (31.6)	83.6 (28.7)	72.7 (22.6)	60.5 (15.8)	50.5 (10.3)	72.9 (22.7)
Daily mean °F (°C)	37.8 (3.2)	43.6 (6.4)	50.5 (10.3)	57.7 (14.3)	65.8 (18.8)	74.1 (23.4)	77.4 (25.2)	75.1 (23.9)	68.5 (20.3)	57.1 (13.9)	45.5 (7.5)	37.1 (2.8)	57.5 (14.2)
Mean daily minimum °F (°C)	23.3 (−4.8)	27.9 (−2.3)	33.7 (0.9)	40.8 (4.9)	49.0 (9.4)	57.1 (13.9)	63.3 (17.4)	61.2 (16.2)	53.4 (11.9)	41.5 (5.3)	30.5 (−0.8)	23.7 (−4.6)	42.1 (5.6)
Mean minimum °F (°C)	11.3 (−11.5)	14.6 (−9.7)	18.8 (−7.3)	27.5 (−2.5)	35.2 (1.8)	45.0 (7.2)	54.8 (12.7)	52.8 (11.6)	40.5 (4.7)	26.7 (−2.9)	16.2 (−8.8)	10.3 (−12.1)	8.2 (−13.2)
Record low °F (°C)	−12 (−24)	−2 (−19)	0 (−18)	15 (−9)	23 (−5)	35 (2)	42 (6)	37 (3)	27 (−3)	14 (−10)	−13 (−25)	−16 (−27)	−16 (−27)
Average precipitation inches (mm)	0.30 (7.6)	0.28 (7.1)	0.51 (13)	0.34 (8.6)	0.38 (9.7)	0.42 (11)	2.43 (62)	2.09 (53)	1.34 (34)	0.94 (24)	0.45 (11)	0.57 (14)	10.05 (255)
Average precipitation days (≥ 0.01 in)	2.8	2.9	2.9	2.2	3.3	3.4	8.7	9.2	6.5	4.3	3.6	3.9	53.7
Source: NOAA

== Demographics ==
Historical population
Census	Pop.	Note	%±
1880	1,272		—
1890	2,295		80.4%
1900	1,512		−34.1%
1910	1,560		3.2%
1920	1,256		−19.5%
1930	2,058		63.9%
1940	3,712		80.4%
1950	4,334		16.8%
1960	5,271		21.6%
1970	5,849		11.0%
1980	7,173		22.6%
1990	8,159		13.7%
2000	8,877		8.8%
2010	9,051		2.0%
2020	8,707		−3.8%
U.S. Decennial Census

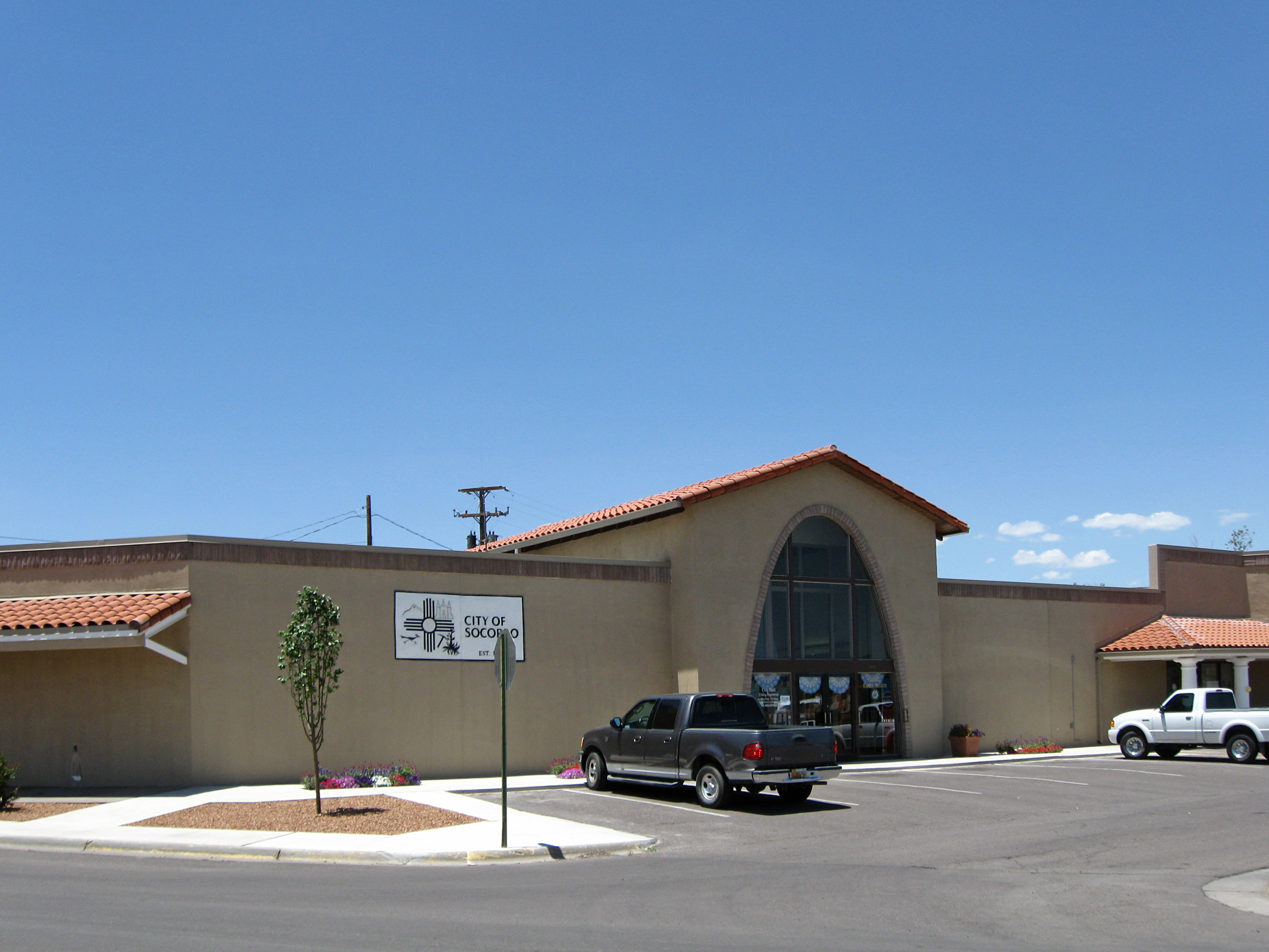
Socorro City Hall

=== 2020 census ===
As of the 2020 census, Socorro had a population of 8,707. The median age was 34.0 years. 19.7% of residents were under the age of 18 and 17.4% of residents were 65 years of age or older. For every 100 females there were 110.8 males, and for every 100 females age 18 and over there were 110.3 males age 18 and over.

90.7% of residents lived in urban areas, while 9.3% lived in rural areas.

There were 3,497 households in Socorro, of which 25.5% had children under the age of 18 living in them. Of all households, 31.2% were married-couple households, 27.5% were households with a male householder and no spouse or partner present, and 32.4% were households with a female householder and no spouse or partner present. About 37.7% of all households were made up of individuals and 14.3% had someone living alone who was 65 years of age or older.

There were 4,060 housing units, of which 13.9% were vacant. The homeowner vacancy rate was 2.2% and the rental vacancy rate was 9.7%.

Racial composition as of the 2020 census
Race	Number	Percent
White	4,461	51.2%
Black or African American	132	1.5%
American Indian and Alaska Native	451	5.2%
Asian	271	3.1%
Native Hawaiian and Other Pacific Islander	5	0.1%
Some other race	1,579	18.1%
Two or more races	1,808	20.8%
Hispanic or Latino (of any race)	4,900	56.3%

=== 2000 census ===
As of the census of 2000, there were 8,877 people, 3,415 households, and 2,151 families residing in the city. The population density was 615.8 inhabitants per square mile (237.8/km^{2}). There were 3,940 housing units at an average density of 273.3 per square mile (105.5/km^{2}). The racial makeup of the city was 66.16% White, 0.74% African American, 2.77% Native American, 2.24% Asian, 0.06% Pacific Islander, 23.24% from other races, and 4.79% from two or more races. Hispanic or Latino of any race were 54.50% of the population. There were 3,415 households, out of which 31.2% had children under the age of 18 living with them, 43.5% were married couples living together, 14.4% had a female householder with no husband present, and 37.0% were non-families. 29.3% of all households were made up of individuals, and 8.3% had someone living alone who was 65 years of age or older. The average household size was 2.44 and the average family size was 3.02. In the City of Socorro 25.4% of the total population was under the age of 18, 16.9% from 18 to 24, 25.7% from 25 to 44, 20.4% from 45 to 64, and 11.6% were 65 years of age or older. The median age was 31 years. For every 100 females, there were 106.6 males.

The median income for a household in the city was $22,530, and the median income for a family was $33,013. Males had a median income of $31,517 versus $23,071 for females. The per capita income for the city was $13,250. About 24.1% of families and 32.3% of the population were below the poverty line, including 44.4% of those under age 18 and 23.6% of those age 65 or over.

The languages spoken at home were 62.41% English, 35.64% Spanish, 0.90% Chinese, 0.76% German, and 0.36% Navajo.

== Economy ==
Major employers in Socorro include the New Mexico Institute of Mining and Technology (NM Tech), the Bureau of Land Management, Socorro General Hospital, the National Radio Astronomy Observatory, municipal and county governments, Socorro Consolidated Schools.

== Science and research ==
The instruments used by the LINEAR program are located at Lincoln Laboratory's Experimental Test Site (ETS) on the White Sands Missile Range (WSMR) near Socorro. The LINEAR program uses telescopes to detect and track near-Earth asteroids.

== Education ==
Socorro Consolidated School District has approx. 2,000 students and 285 staff. Socorro has one public high school, Socorro High School.

The town is the location of the New Mexico Institute of Mining and Technology, which is a state-funded research- and teaching-oriented university. New Mexico Tech has approximately 1,500 undergraduate students, 500 graduate students, and 150 academic staff.

Currently, the Summer Science Program in Astrophysics is hosted at New Mexico Tech.

== Infrastructure ==
Highways

- Interstate 25, north–south travel: north through Albuquerque and south to Las Cruces which is the terminus for I-25 where it intersects I-10.
- U.S. Route 60, east–west travel: east through Clovis; west through Magdalena to Arizona.
- NM 1
- NM 439

Rail

Freight service is provided by a BNSF line from Belen, New Mexico to El Paso, Texas. Passenger service ceased in 1968, when ATSF (BNSF’s predecessor) cancelled its El Pasoan train.

Airport

The Socorro airport, located on the southern edge of the city, received scheduled airline service by Continental Airlines in the early 1950s. A Douglas DC-3 aircraft provided a daily northbound flight to Albuquerque (that went on to Denver after several stops) and a southbound flight to El Paso with stops at Truth or Consequences and Las Cruces. Zia Airlines, a small commuter airline, also made on-demand flag stops at the Socorro airport on their flights between Albuquerque and Las Cruces in the mid 1970s. The airport remains in use as a general aviation facility with several based aircraft.

== Recreation and tourism ==
=== Points of interest ===
- San Miguel de Socorro – San Miguel Mission
- National Radio Astronomy Observatory Very Large Array
- Bosque del Apache National Wildlife Refuge
- Sevilleta National Wildlife Refuge
- Trinity (nuclear test) site – White Sands Missile Range
- Owl Bar and Cafe
- Bataan Memorial Death March – White Sands Missile Range

=== Golf ===
The Elfego Baca Golf Shoot is named after a former mayor of Socorro who survived a gun battle near what is now Reserve, New Mexico, involving over 4,000 bullets that were fired over the course of 36 hours. The golf shoot begins by teeing off from Socorro Peak, also known as M Mountain, at an altitude of 7,243 feet (2,208 m), golfers proceed down the side of the mountain some 2,550 vertical feet to the one hole almost 3.1 miles (5 km) away.

== In popular culture ==
12 Strong (2018) includes several scenes set in Afghanistan that were recorded in the Socorro area, including several days of filming at M Mountain within the Energetic Materials Research and Testing Center's bomb range. Fifty extras from Socorro and surrounding areas appeared in several scenes in the film. Filming also took place at White Sands National Monument and Fort Bliss. During this time, most of the production crew and actors on the film (made with the working title Horse Soldiers) stayed at hotels in Socorro and ate at local restaurants. Chris Hemsworth was spotted at the Socorro Springs restaurant and New Mexico Institute of Mining and Technology's gym.

== Notable people ==
- Elfego Baca (1865–1945), lawman, lawyer and politician
- Jeff Bhasker, record producer and musician
- Holm O. Bursum (1867–1953), politician
- Conrad Hilton (1887–1979), founder of the Hilton Hotels chain
- Robert Fortune Sanchez (1938–2012), Roman Catholic archbishop
- Jan Thomas (1958— ), children's author and illustrator

== Bibliography ==
- Socorro "Saucer" in a Pentagon Pantry, Ray Stanford, author. Blueapple Books, 1976.
- X Descending, Christian Lambright, author. X Desk Publishing, 2012. pp. 269–274.
- The UFO Book: Encyclopedia of the Extraterrestrial, Jerome Clark, author. Visible Ink Press, 1998. pp. 545–558.
