= National Register of Historic Places listings in Socorro County, New Mexico =

Location of Socorro County in New Mexico

This is a list of the National Register of Historic Places listings in Socorro County, New Mexico.

This is intended to be a complete list of the properties and districts on the National Register of Historic Places in Socorro County, New Mexico, United States. Latitude and longitude coordinates are provided for many National Register properties and districts; these locations may be seen together in a map.

There are 55 properties and districts listed on the National Register in the county, including 1 National Historic Landmark. Another property was once listed but has been removed. All of the places within the county on the National Register, except for one, are also listed on the State Register of Cultural Properties.

This National Park Service list is complete through NPS recent listings posted August 28, 2026.

Contents: NRHP in New Mexico by county
Bernalillo – Catron – Chaves – Cibola – Colfax – Curry – De Baca – Doña Ana – Eddy – Grant – Guadalupe – Harding – Hidalgo – Lea – Lincoln – Los Alamos – Luna – McKinley – Mora – Otero – Quay – Rio Arriba – Roosevelt – San Juan – San Miguel – Sandoval – Santa Fe – Sierra – Socorro – Taos – Torrance – Union – Valencia

== Current listings ==
	Name on the Register	Image	Date listed	Location	City or town	Description
1	Aragon House	Aragon House	August 2, 1982 (#82003327)	2nd and Oak Sts. 34°06′55″N 107°14′44″W	Magdalena	
2	Archeological Site No. LA 1069		April 15, 1993 (#93000243)	Address Restricted	Bingham	
3	Archeological Site No. LA 1070		April 15, 1993 (#93000244)	Address Restricted	Bingham	
4	Archeological Site No. LA 1071		April 15, 1993 (#93000245)	Address Restricted	Bingham	
5	Archeological Site No. LA 1072		April 15, 1993 (#93000246)	Address Restricted	Bingham	
6	Archeological Site No. LA 1073		April 15, 1993 (#93000247)	Address Restricted	Bingham	
7	Archeological Site No. LA 1074		April 15, 1993 (#93000248)	Address Restricted	Bingham	
8	Archeological Site No. LA 1075		April 15, 1993 (#93000249)	Address Restricted	Bingham	
9	Archeological Site No. LA 1076		April 15, 1993 (#93000250)	Address Restricted	Bingham	
10	Archeological Site No. LA 1181		April 15, 1993 (#93000251)	Address Restricted	Bingham	
11	Archeological Site No. LA 1201		April 15, 1993 (#93000252)	Address Restricted	Bingham	
12	Atchison, Topeka and Santa Fe Railway Depot	Atchison, Topeka and Santa Fe Railway Depot	December 29, 1978 (#78001829)	108 N. Main Street; 34°07′06″N 107°14′36″W	Magdalena	Now the village hall and library
13	A.B. Baca House	A.B. Baca House	February 20, 1991 (#91000036)	201 School of Mines Rd. 34°03′31″N 106°53′38″W	Socorro	
14	Bank of Magdalena	Bank of Magdalena	August 2, 1982 (#82003328)	1st and Main Sts. 34°07′02″N 107°14′36″W	Magdalena	
15	Biavaschi Saloon-Capitol Bar	Biavaschi Saloon-Capitol Bar	January 2, 2024 (#100009669)	110 Plaza Street; 34°03′26″N 106°53′34″W	Socorro	
16	Brown Hall	Brown Hall	May 16, 1989 (#88001550)	New Mexico Institute of Mining and Technology; 34°03′59″N 106°54′17″W	Socorro	
17	Bursum House	Bursum House	June 18, 1975 (#75001172)	326 Church St. 34°03′20″N 106°53′46″W	Socorro	
18	Camino Real-Qualacu Pueblo		April 8, 2011 (#11000173)	Address Restricted	San Antonio vicinity	part of the Camino Real in New Mexico, AD 1598-1881 Multiple Property Submission
19	Camino Real-San Pascual Pueblo		April 8, 2011 (#11000164)	Address Restricted	San Antonio vicinity	part of the Camino Real in New Mexico, AD 1598-1881 Multiple Property Submission
20	Clemens Ranchhouse		April 18, 1979 (#79001557)	South of Magdalena; 34°05′03″N 107°13′46″W	Magdalena	
21	Captain Michael Cooney House	Captain Michael Cooney House	February 20, 1991 (#91000029)	309 McCutcheon Ave. 34°03′19″N 106°53′40″W	Socorro	
22	Anthony Cortesy House	Anthony Cortesy House	February 20, 1991 (#91000033)	327 McCutcheon Ave. 34°03′19″N 106°53′46″W	Socorro	
23	Nestor P. Eaton House	Nestor P. Eaton House	February 20, 1991 (#91000034)	313 McCutcheon Ave. 34°03′19″N 106°53′41″W	Socorro	
24	El Camino Real de Tierra Adentro-Arroyo Alamillo North Section		November 5, 2014 (#14000898)	Address restricted	San Acacia vicinity	
25	Fitch Hall	Fitch Hall	May 16, 1989 (#88001551)	New Mexico Institute of Mining and Technology; 34°03′55″N 106°54′15″W	Socorro	
26	James Gurden Fitch House	James Gurden Fitch House	February 20, 1991 (#91000035)	311 McCutcheon Ave. 34°03′19″N 106°53′40″W	Socorro	
27	Fort Craig	Fort Craig	October 15, 1970 (#70000414)	37 miles (60 km) south of Socorro; 33°38′25″N 107°00′46″W	Socorro	
28	Gallinas Springs Ruin		September 4, 1970 (#70000413)	Address Restricted	Magdalena	
29	Garcia Opera House	Garcia Opera House	August 13, 1974 (#74001210)	Terry Ave. and California St. 34°03′30″N 106°53′28″W	Socorro	
30	Juan Nepomuceno Garcia House	Juan Nepomuceno Garcia House	February 20, 1991 (#91000027)	108 Bernard St. 34°03′29″N 106°53′32″W	Socorro	
31	Gran Quivera Historic District	Gran Quivera Historic District	June 15, 2015 (#15000355)	Along NM 55 approx. 25 mi. S. of Mountainair; 34°15′55″N 106°06′09″W	Mountainair vicinity	Part of Salinas Pueblo Missions National Monument; extends into Torrance County
32	Gutierrez House	Gutierrez House	August 2, 1982 (#82003329)	3rd and Popular Sts. 34°07′00″N 107°14′19″W	Magdalena	
33	Hall Hotel	Hall Hotel	August 2, 1982 (#82003330)	2nd and Spruce Sts. 34°07′00″N 107°14′30″W	Magdalena	
34	Hilton House	Hilton House	August 2, 1982 (#82003331)	U.S. Route 60; 34°07′13″N 107°13′59″W	Magdalena	
35	August Holver Hilton House	August Holver Hilton House	February 20, 1991 (#91000031)	601 Park St. 34°03′05″N 106°53′35″W	Socorro	
36	House at 303 Eaton Avenue	House at 303 Eaton Avenue	February 20, 1991 (#91000032)	303 Eaton Ave. 34°03′20″N 106°53′50″W	Socorro	
37	House at 405 Park Street	House at 405 Park Street	February 20, 1991 (#91000030)	405 Park St. 34°03′17″N 106°53′36″W	Socorro	
38	Ilfeld Warehouse	Ilfeld Warehouse	August 2, 1982 (#82003332)	200 N. Main St. 34°07′06″N 107°14′40″W	Magdalena	
39	Illinois Brewery	Illinois Brewery	September 2, 1975 (#75001173)	Neal Ave. and 6th St. 34°03′46″N 106°53′25″W	Socorro	
40	Lewellen House	Lewellen House	August 2, 1982 (#82003333)	2nd and Chestnut Sts. 34°07′03″N 107°14′18″W	Magdalena	
41	MacDonald Merchandise Building		September 25, 1980 (#80002573)	U.S. Route 60; 34°06′58″N 107°14′40″W	Magdalena	No longer extant; removed from the state register
42	MacTavish House	MacTavish House	August 2, 1982 (#82003334)	302 Elm St. 34°06′51″N 107°14′37″W	Magdalena	
43	Magdaline House	Magdaline House	August 2, 1982 (#82003335)	3rd and Chestnut Sts. 34°07′01″N 107°14′17″W	Magdalena	
44	Main Street Commercial Building	Main Street Commercial Building	August 2, 1982 (#82003336)	106 N. Main Street; 34°07′04″N 107°14′37″W	Magdalena	
45	Sagrada Familia de Lemitar Church, Los Dulces Nombres	Sagrada Familia de Lemitar Church, Los Dulces Nombres	February 24, 1983 (#83001631)	Off Interstate 25; 34°09′37″N 106°54′28″W	Lemitar	
46	Salinas Pueblo Missions National Monument	Salinas Pueblo Missions National Monument	October 15, 1966 (#66000494)	1 mile (1.6 km) east of Gran Quivira on State Road 10; 34°15′35″N 106°05′25″W	Gran Quivira	Extends into Torrance County
47	Salome Store	Salome Store	August 2, 1982 (#82003337)	1st St. 34°06′58″N 107°14′42″W	Magdalena	
48	Salome Warehouse	Salome Warehouse	August 2, 1982 (#82003338)	1st St. 34°06′59″N 107°14′43″W	Magdalena	
49	San Felipe Pueblo Ruin		April 25, 1983 (#83001632)	Near the confluence of Milligan Gulch and the Rio Grande; 33°36′47″N 107°01′33″W	Socorro	
50	San Miguel Church	San Miguel Church	April 12, 2016 (#16000162)	403 El Camino Real St., NW; 34°03′37″N 106°53′38″W	Socorro	
51	Seco Ruin		June 17, 1994 (#94000614)	Address Restricted	Chupadera	
52	Teypama Piro Site		October 21, 1983 (#83004179)	Address Restricted	Socorro	
53	Trinity Site	Trinity Site	October 15, 1966 (#66000493)	25 miles (40 km) south of U.S. Route 380 on the White Sands Missile Range; 33°39′08″N 106°29′34″W	Bingham	
54	Val Verde Hotel	Val Verde Hotel	September 13, 1977 (#77000930)	203 Manzanares St. 34°03′28″N 106°53′22″W	Socorro	
55	Rufina Vigil House	Rufina Vigil House	February 20, 1991 (#91000028)	407 Park St. 34°03′15″N 106°53′39″W	Socorro	Locally known as "Casa de Flecha"

== Former listing ==
	Name on the Register	Image	Date listed	Date removed	Location	City or town	Description
1	Severo A. Baca House		August 13, 1974 (#74002268)	September 2, 1975	Park and Church Sts. 34°03′30″N 106°53′29″W	Socorro	Destroyed by fire in 1975.

== See also ==
- List of National Historic Landmarks in New Mexico
- National Register of Historic Places listings in New Mexico
