= Fitch House =

Fitch House may refer to:

in the United States

(by state then town)

- Fitch House (Tuscaloosa, Alabama), listed on the NRHP in Tuscaloosa County
- Sloan-Raymond-Fitch House, Wilton, Connecticut, listed on the NRHP in Fairfield County
- Fitch's General Store and House, East Sebago, Maine, listed on the NRHP in Cumberland County
- Peabody-Fitch House, South Bridgton, Maine, listed on the NRHP in Cumberland County
- C.H. Fitch House, Worcester, Massachusetts, listed on the NRHP in Worcester County, Massachusetts
- Fitch Hall, Socorro, New Mexico, listed on the NRHP in Socorro County
- James Gurden Fitch House, Socorro, New Mexico, listed on the NRHP in Socorro County
- Charles C. Fitch Farmstead, Eugene, Oregon, listed on the NRHP in Lane County

== See also ==
- Fitch Terrace, Pueblo, Colorado, listed on the NRHP in Pueblo County, Colorado
