= Clemens House =

Clemens House may refer to:

in the United States

(by state)

- Clemens House (Huntsville, Alabama), listed on the National Register of Historic Places (NRHP)
- Clemens House (Biloxi, Mississippi), listed on the NRHP in Harrison County, Mississippi
- Clemens House-Columbia Brewery District, St. Louis, Missouri, NRHP-listed
- Orion Clemens House, Carson City, Nevada, NRHP-listed
- Clemens Ranchhouse, Magdalena, New Mexico, listed on the NRHP in Socorro County, New Mexico
- James and Sophia Clemens Farmstead, Palestine, Ohio, NRHP-listed
- Michael Clemens House, Grants Pass, Oregon, listed on the NRHP in Josephine County, Oregon
