= Garcia House =

Garcia House may refer to:

- Domingo Yorba Adobe and Casa Manuel Garcia, San Juan Capistrano, California, listed on the NRHP in Orange County, California
- Garcia House (Los Angeles, California), also known as "Rainbow", designed by architect John Lautner
- Tomasa Griego De Garcia House, Albuquerque, New Mexico, listed on the NRHP in Bernalillo County, New Mexico
- Garcia House (Mora, New Mexico), listed on the NRHP in Mora County
- Garcia Opera House, Socorro, New Mexico, listed on the NRHP in Socorro County
- Juan Antonio Garcia House, Albuquerque, New Mexico, listed on the NRHP in Bernalillo County
- Juan Nepomuceno Garcia House, Socorro, New Mexico, listed on the NRHP in Socorro County
- Juan Garcia House, La Luz, New Mexico, listed on the NRHP in Otero County
- Garcia-Garza House, San Antonio, Texas, listed on the NRHP in Bexar County, Texas
