= Bank of Magdalena =

- U.S. National Register of Historic Places
- NM State Register of Cultural Properties
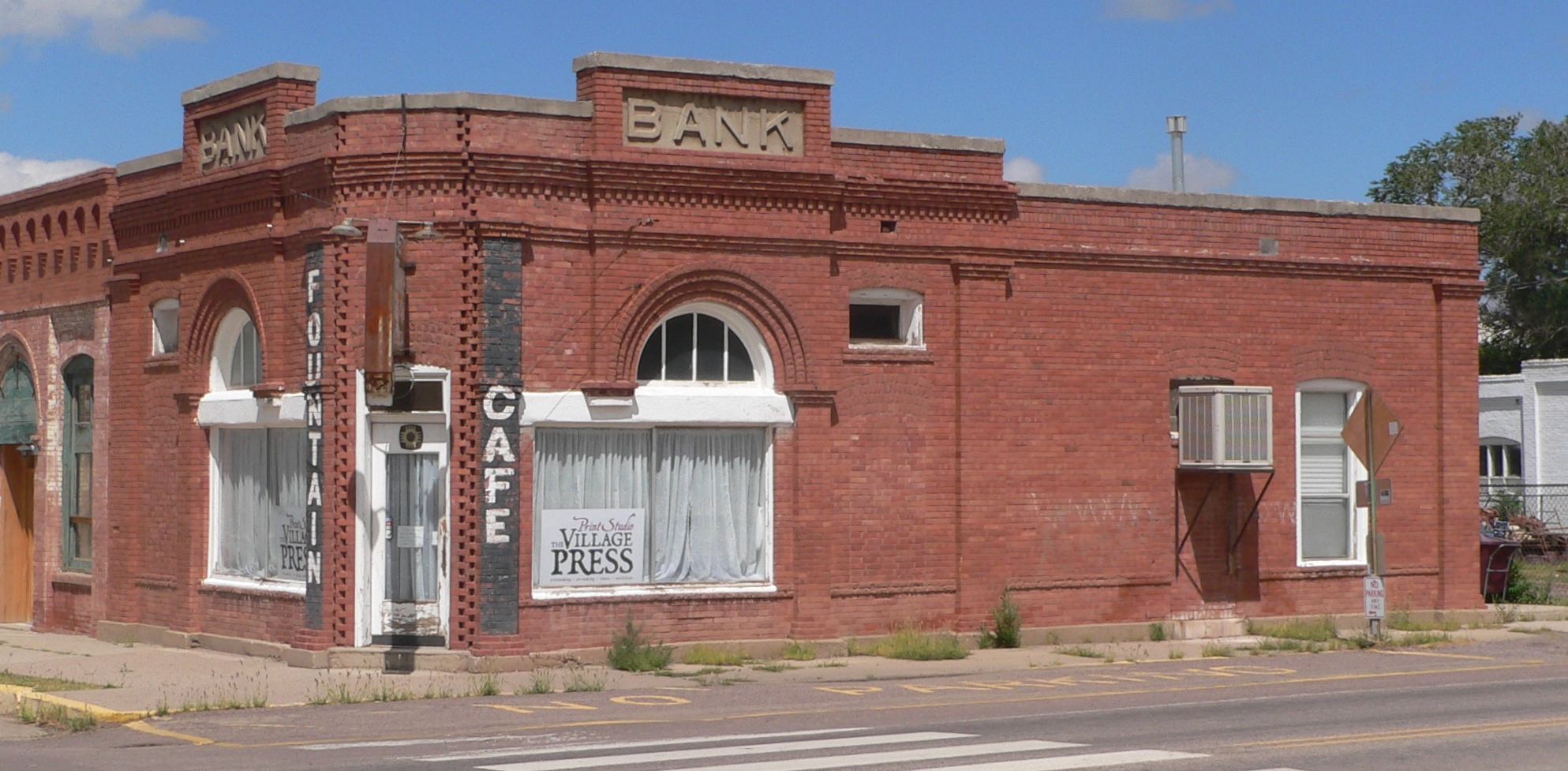
- View from south

- Location within New Mexico Location within the United States
- Location: 1st and Main Sts., Magdalena, New Mexico
- Coordinates: 34°7′3″N 107°14′36″W
- Area: less than one acre
- Built: 1908–1913
- MPS: Magdalena MRA
- NRHP reference No.: 82003328
- NMSRCP No.: 412

Significant dates
- Added to NRHP: August 2, 1982
- Designated NMSRCP: October 31, 1975

The Bank of Magdalena at 1st and Main Streets in Magdalena, New Mexico was listed on the National Register of Historic Places in 1982.

Designed by Albuquerque architect Edward Buxton Cristy, it is a one-story flat-roofed brick building with decorative brickwork along parapets and cornices that was partly built before 1908 and completed by 1913.

It is one of few historic commercial buildings in Magdalena that are in good condition and is significant "as a good example of the Panel Brick Style in Magdalena."

== See also ==
- National Register of Historic Places listings in Socorro County, New Mexico
