= Lewellen =

Lewellen may refer to:

- Lewellen (surname)
- Lewellen, Nebraska
- Lewellen House
- Lewellen State Aid Bridge
