= Hilton House (Magdalena, New Mexico) =

Historic house in New Mexico, United States

- U.S. National Register of Historic Places
- NM State Register of Cultural Properties
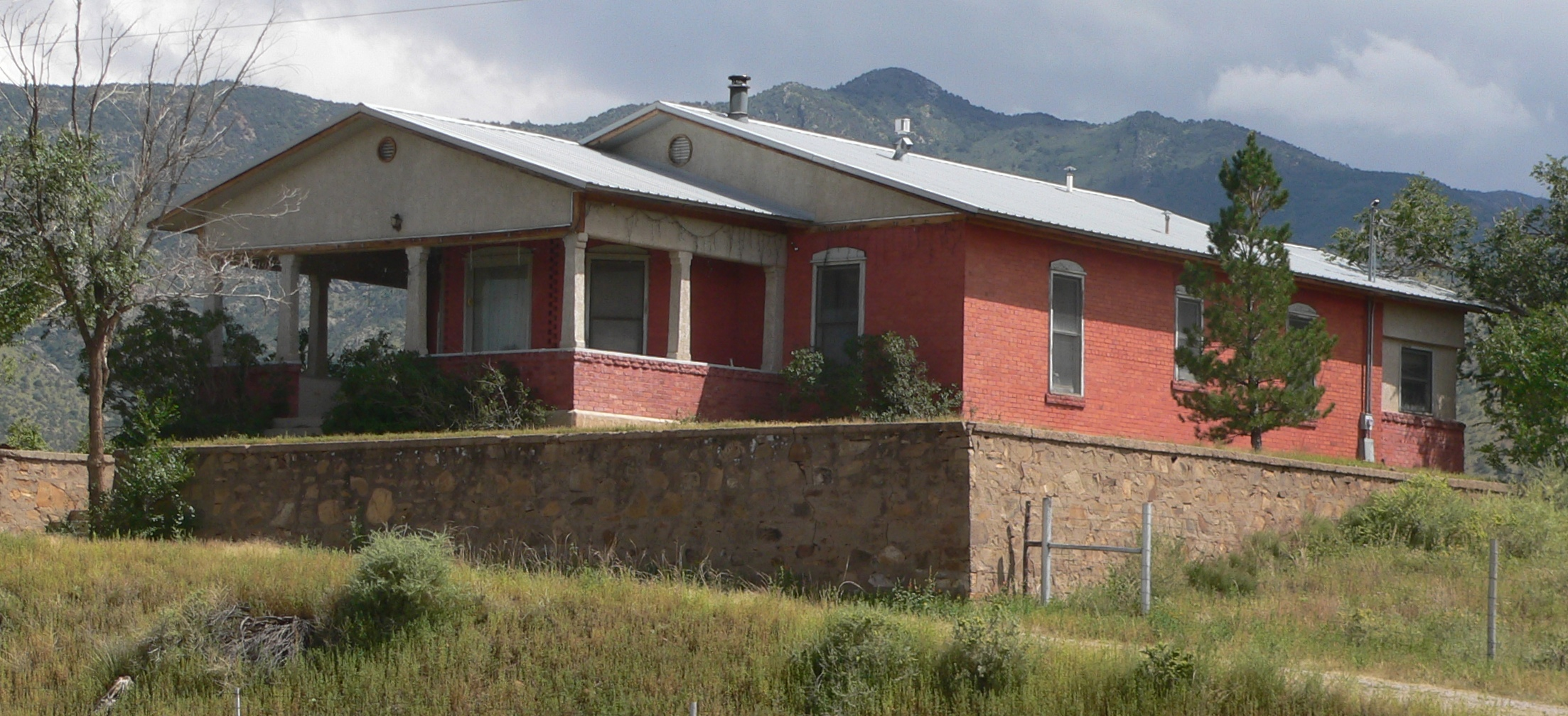

- Location within New Mexico Location within the United States
- Location: US 60, Magdalena, New Mexico
- Coordinates: 34°7′15″N 107°14′1″W
- Area: less than one acre
- MPS: Magdalena MRA
- NRHP reference No.: 82003331
- NMSRCP No.: 872

Significant dates
- Added to NRHP: August 2, 1982
- Designated NMSRCP: April 15, 1982

The Hilton House in Magdalena, New Mexico was built in about 1902. It was listed on the National Register of Historic Places in 1982.

It was deemed significant "as one of the finest and most prominent houses in Magdalena." It was owned for a period by the Hilton family that operated a hotel in Magdalena.

== See also ==
- August Holver Hilton House, also NRHP-listed in Socorro County
- National Register of Historic Places listings in Socorro County, New Mexico
