= MacTavish House =

- U.S. National Register of Historic Places
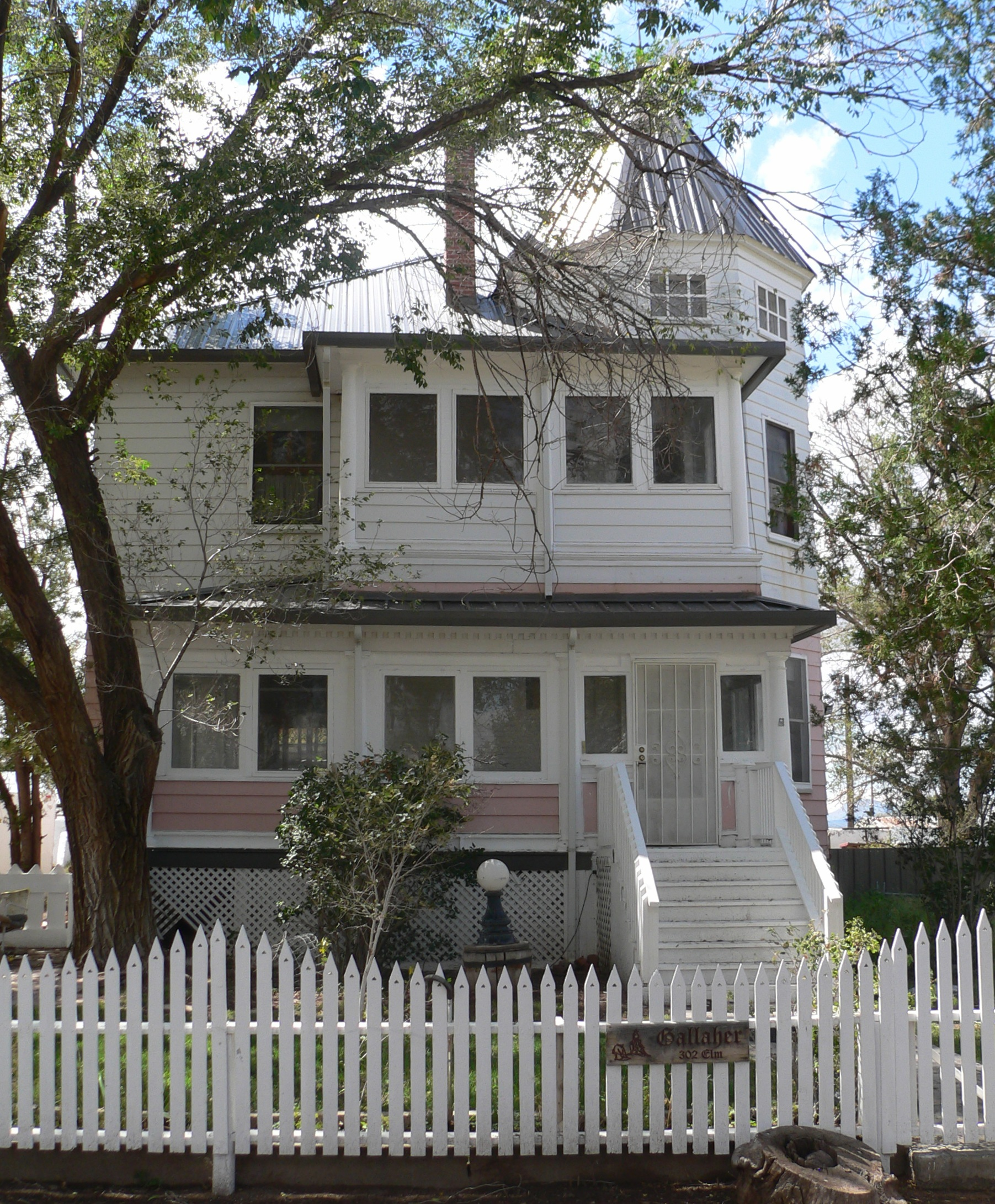

- Location within New Mexico Location within the United States
- Location: 302 Elm St., Magdalena, New Mexico
- Coordinates: 34°06′51″N 107°14′37″W
- Area: less than one acre
- Built: 1915
- Built by: J.S. MacTavish
- Architectural style: Queen Anne
- MPS: Magdalena MRA
- NRHP reference No.: 82003334
- Added to NRHP: August 2, 1982

The MacTavish House, on Elm St. in Magdalena, New Mexico, was built in 1915. It was listed on the National Register of Historic Places in 1982.

It is a two-story woodframe house upon a stone foundation. It reflects Queen Anne style influence, including that it has a turret.

It was built by and/or for J.S. MacTavish (1867-1947), who was born in Scotland, who arrived in Magdalena soon after it was founded, and who was a successful businessman.
