= Hall Hotel =

- U.S. National Register of Historic Places
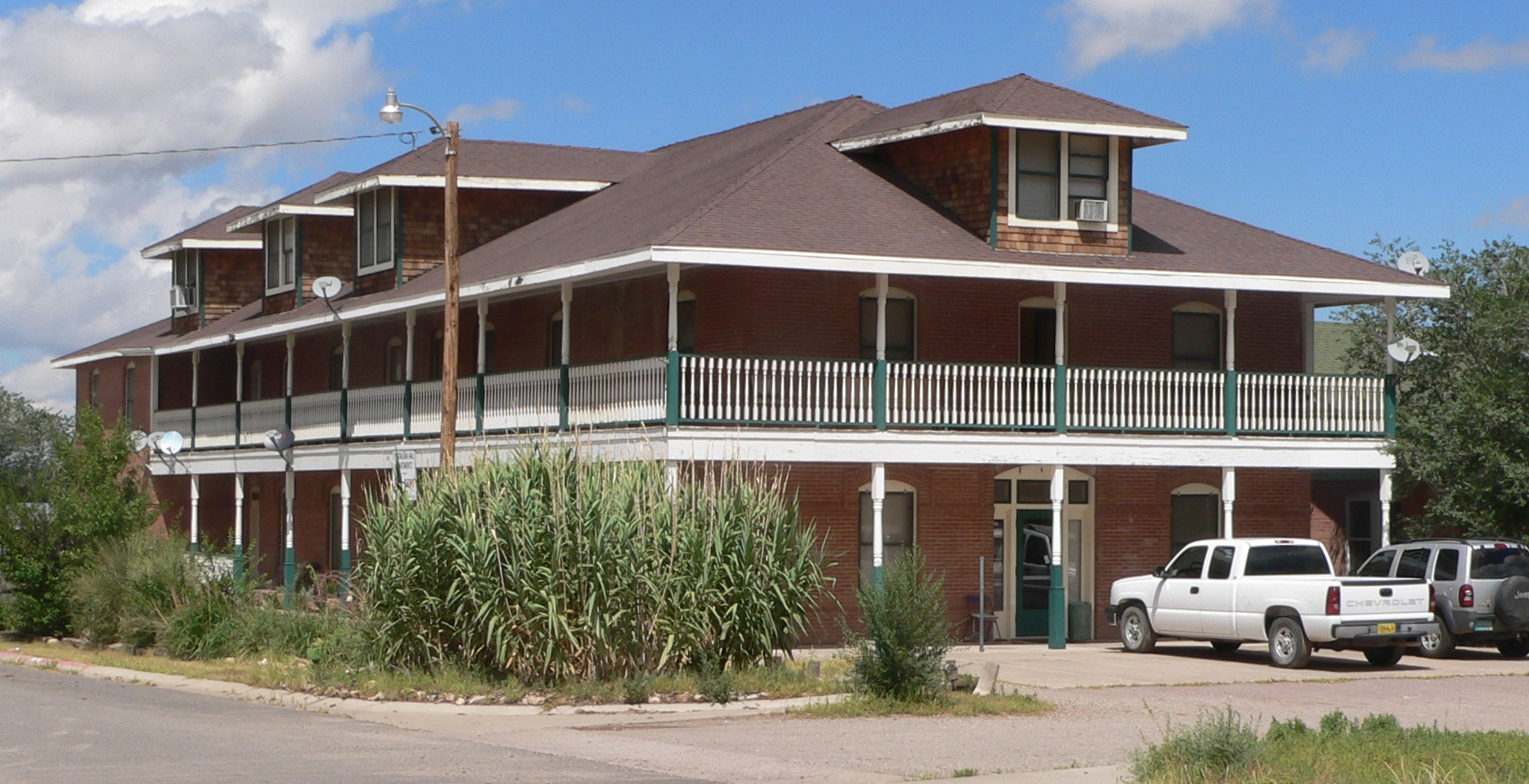

- Location within New Mexico
- Location: 2nd and Spruce Sts., Magdalena, New Mexico
- Coordinates: 34°07′00″N 107°14′30″W
- Area: less than one acre
- Built: 1917
- Built by: Hall, Harry
- MPS: Magdalena MRA
- NRHP reference No.: 82003330
- Added to NRHP: August 2, 1982

The Hall Hotel, at 2nd and Spruce Streets in Magdalena, New Mexico, was built in 1916. It was listed on the National Register of Historic Places in 1982.

It is also known as the Old Magdalena Hall Hotel.
