= Aragon House (Magdalena, New Mexico) =

- U.S. National Register of Historic Places
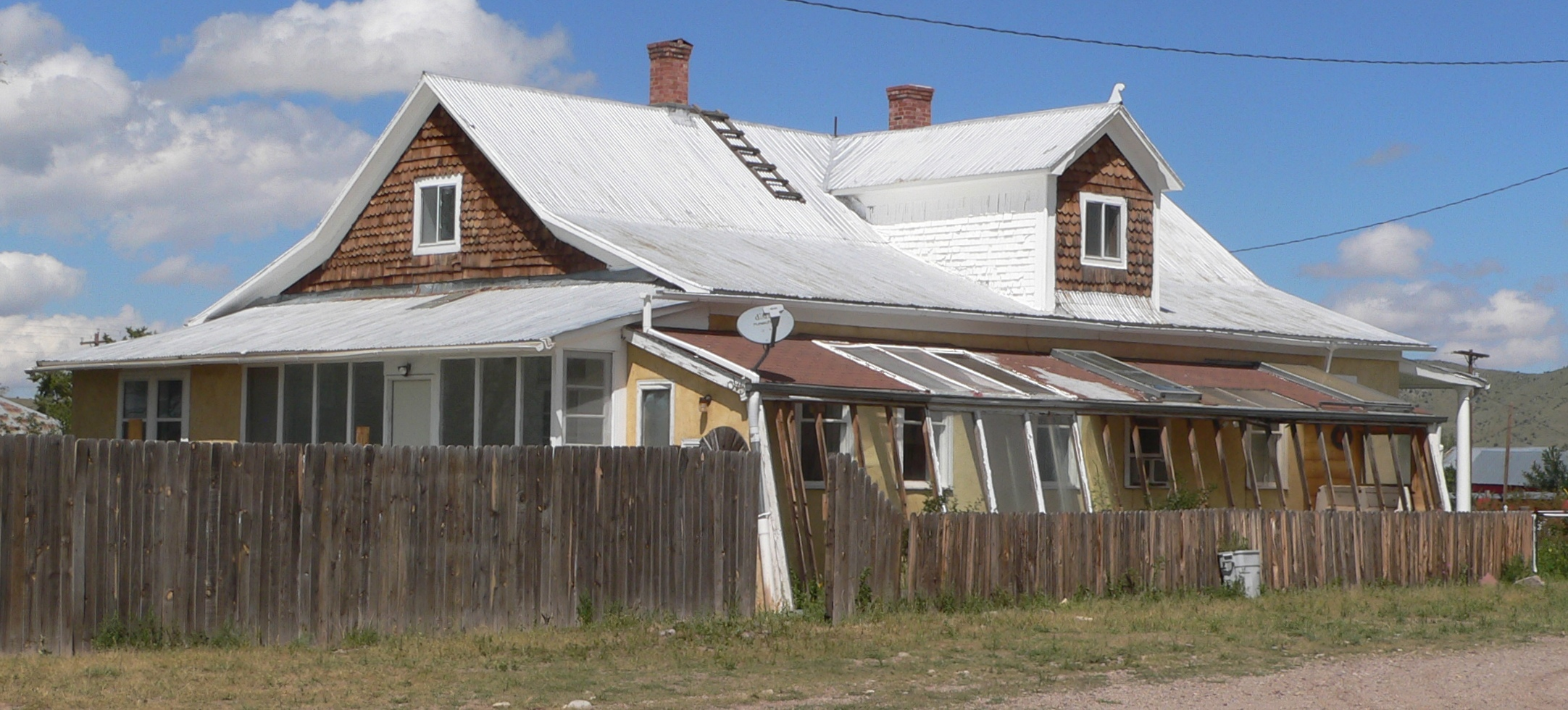

- Location within New Mexico
- Location: 2nd and Oak Sts., Magdalena, New Mexico
- Coordinates: 34°06′55″N 107°14′44″W
- Area: less than one acre
- Built: c.1915
- MPS: Magdalena MRA
- NRHP reference No.: 82003327
- Added to NRHP: August 2, 1982

The Aragon House, at 2nd and Oak Sts. in Magdalena, New Mexico, was built around 1915. It was listed on the National Register of Historic Places in 1982.

It is a one-and-a-half-story stuccoed adobe house built upon a stone foundation.

It was deemed significant "as a good example of finer houses built during Magdalena's wealthiest years. The house has broad proportions and fine details which include the front veranda, stained glass, and bell-cast roof." It was listed as part of a multiple resource study of historic properties in Magdalena.
