= Gutierrez House =

- U.S. National Register of Historic Places
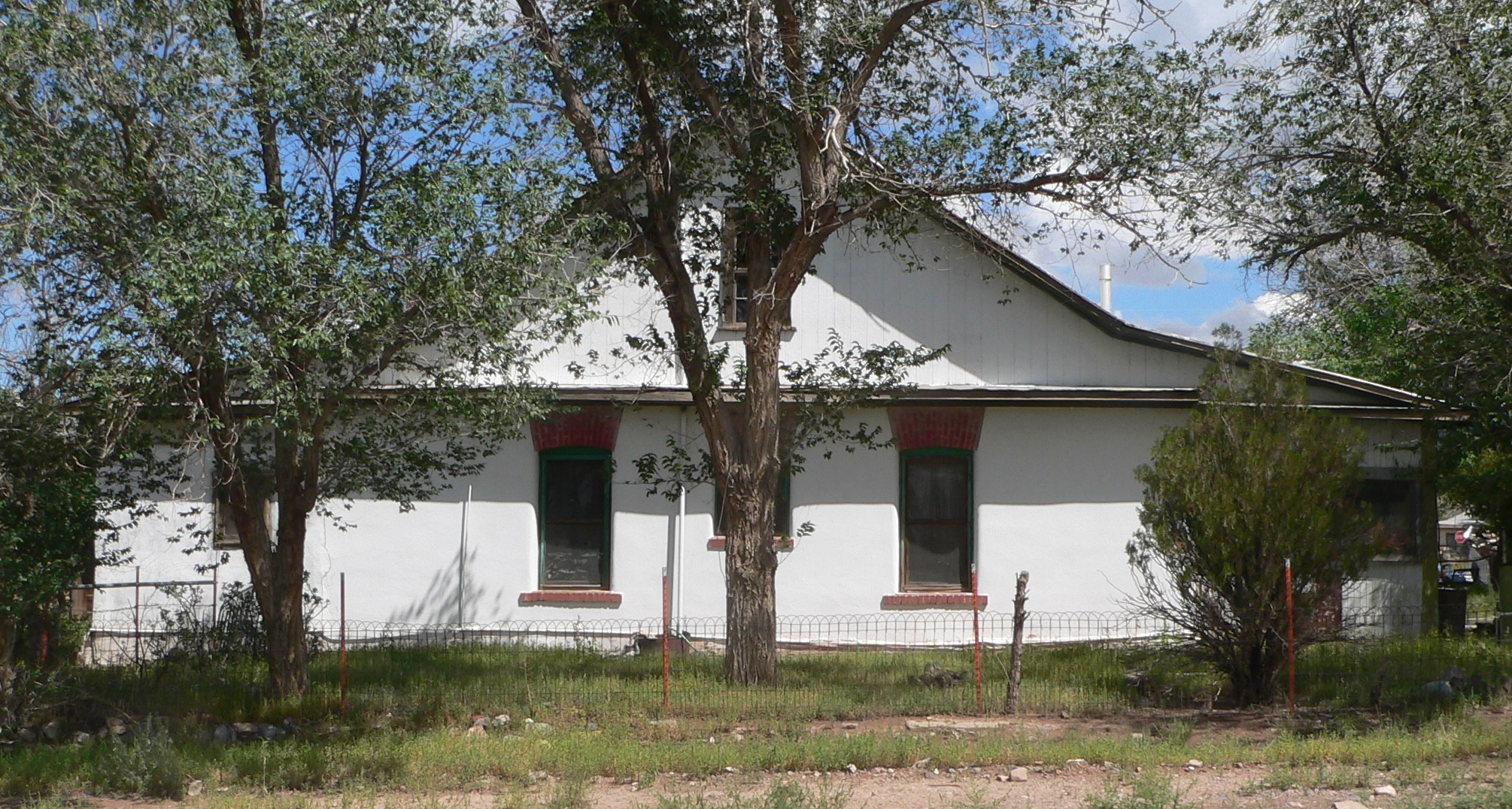

- Location within New Mexico
- Location: 3rd and Popular Sts., Magdalena, New Mexico
- Coordinates: 34°07′00″N 107°14′19″W
- Area: less than one acre
- MPS: Magdalena MRA
- NRHP reference No.: 82003329
- Added to NRHP: August 2, 1982

The Gutierrez House in Magdalena, New Mexico, at 3rd and Popular Sts., was listed on the National Register of Historic Places in 1982.

It was one of 15 buildings listed as part of a study of the historic resources in Magdalena.
