= August Holver Hilton House =

Historic house in New Mexico, United States

- U.S. National Register of Historic Places
- NM State Register of Cultural Properties
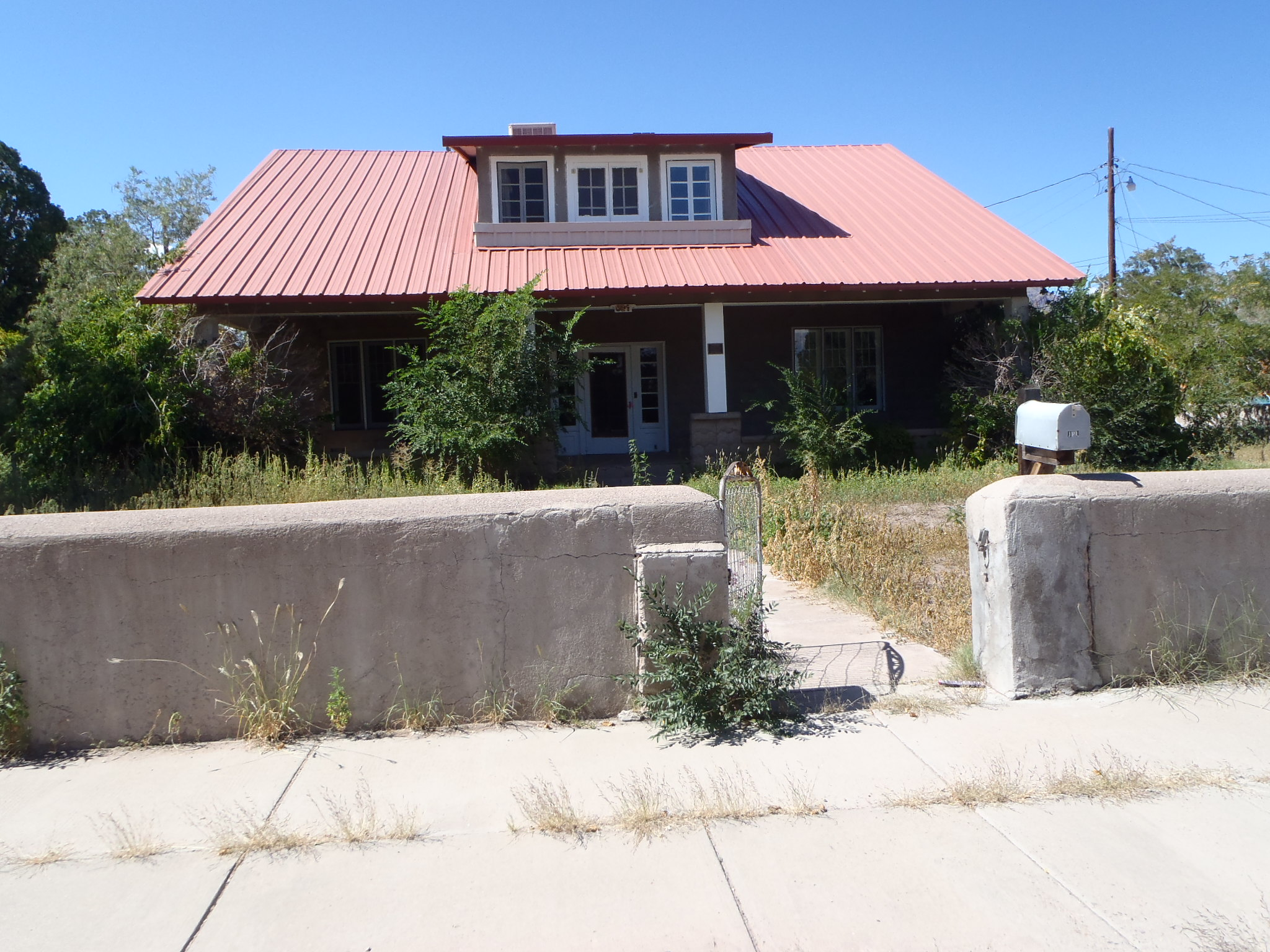

- Location within New Mexico Location within the United States
- Location: 601 Park St., Socorro, New Mexico
- Coordinates: 34°3′5″N 106°53′35″W
- Area: less than one acre
- Built: 1912
- Architectural style: Bungalow/Craftsman
- MPS: Domestic Architecture in Socorro MPS
- NRHP reference No.: 91000031
- NMSRCP No.: 631

Significant dates
- Added to NRHP: February 20, 1991
- Designated NMSRCP: March 31, 1978

The August Holver Hilton House in Socorro, New Mexico was built in 1912. The house was deemed historically important as the home of August Holver Hilton, father of Conrad Hilton. The father, born in 1856 in Norway, was successful as a merchant in San Antonio.

It is of Bungalow/Craftsman architecture. It is also denoted ID#664 and SR Site #631. The listing included two contributing buildings.

It was listed on the National Register of Historic Places in 1991.

== See also ==
- Hilton House (Magdalena, New Mexico), also NRHP-listed in Socorro County
- National Register of Historic Places listings in Socorro County, New Mexico
