= Sagrada Familia de Lemitar Church, Los Dulces Nombres =

Historic church in New Mexico, United States

- U.S. National Register of Historic Places
- NM State Register of Cultural Properties
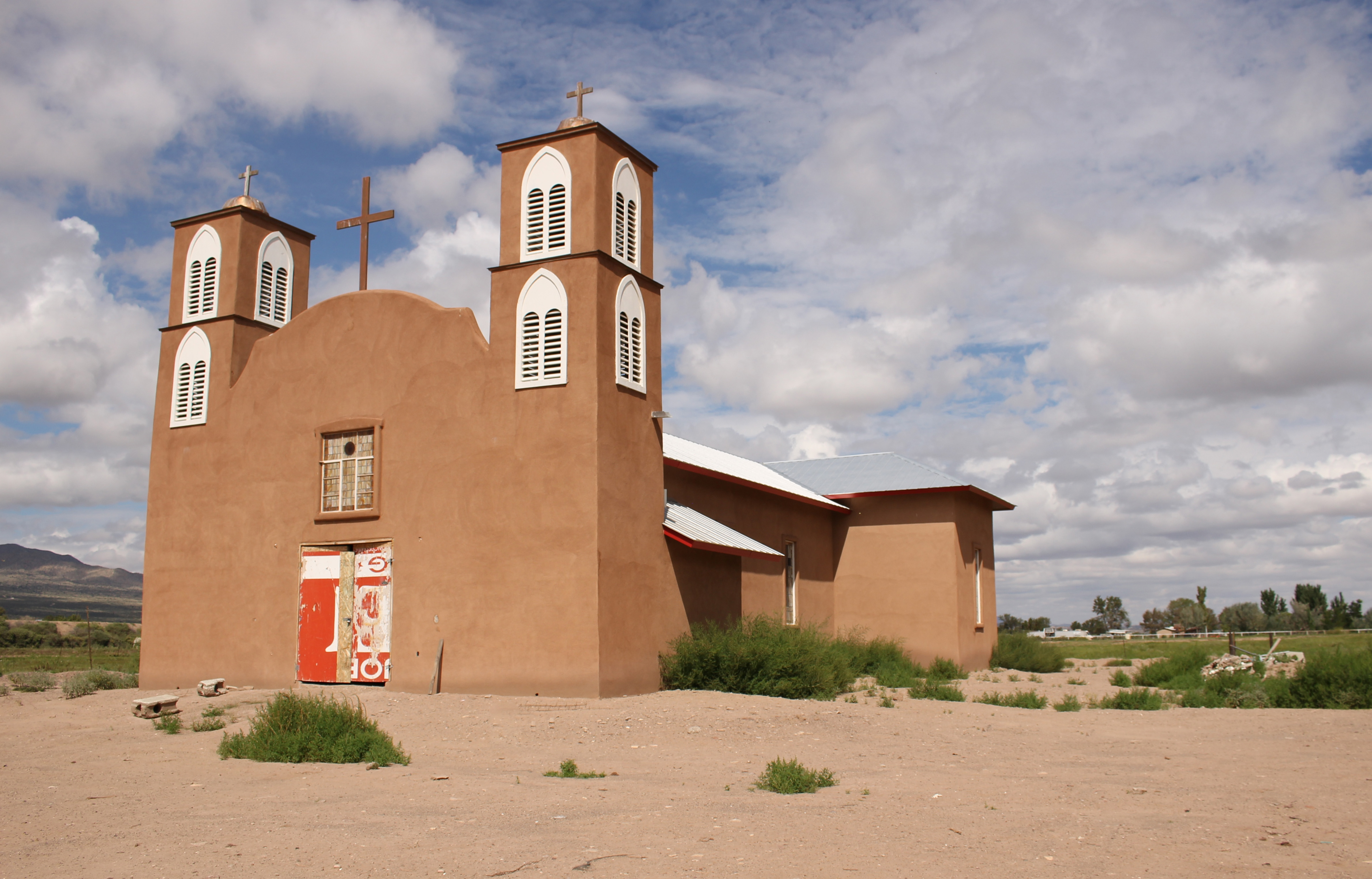

- Location within New Mexico Location within the United States
- Location: Off I-25, Lemitar, New Mexico
- Coordinates: 34°9′37″N 106°54′28″W
- Area: 0.5 acres (0.20 ha)
- NRHP reference No.: 83001631
- NMSRCP No.: 873

Significant dates
- Added to NRHP: February 24, 1983
- Designated NMSRCP: April 15, 1982

Sagrada Familia de Lemitar Church, Los Dulces Nombres (Lemitar Church) is a historic church off Interstate 25 in Lemitar, New Mexico. It was constructed in the early 1830s and has been renovated and added to several times thereafter. Work in around 1900 gave the adobe building a pitched, metal roof and clear glass windows; in 1950 Conrad Hilton made a donation which, with funds raised by parishioners, paid for stained glass windows and wooden flooring. The present facade and bell towers were added in 1963. Unfortunately in 2010 the west wall of the church collapsed during renovations started the previous year; the building was deemed irreparable and was totally rebuilt.

It was added to the National Register of Historic Places in 1983.

== See also ==
- National Register of Historic Places listings in Socorro County, New Mexico
