= Ilfeld Warehouse =

- U.S. National Register of Historic Places
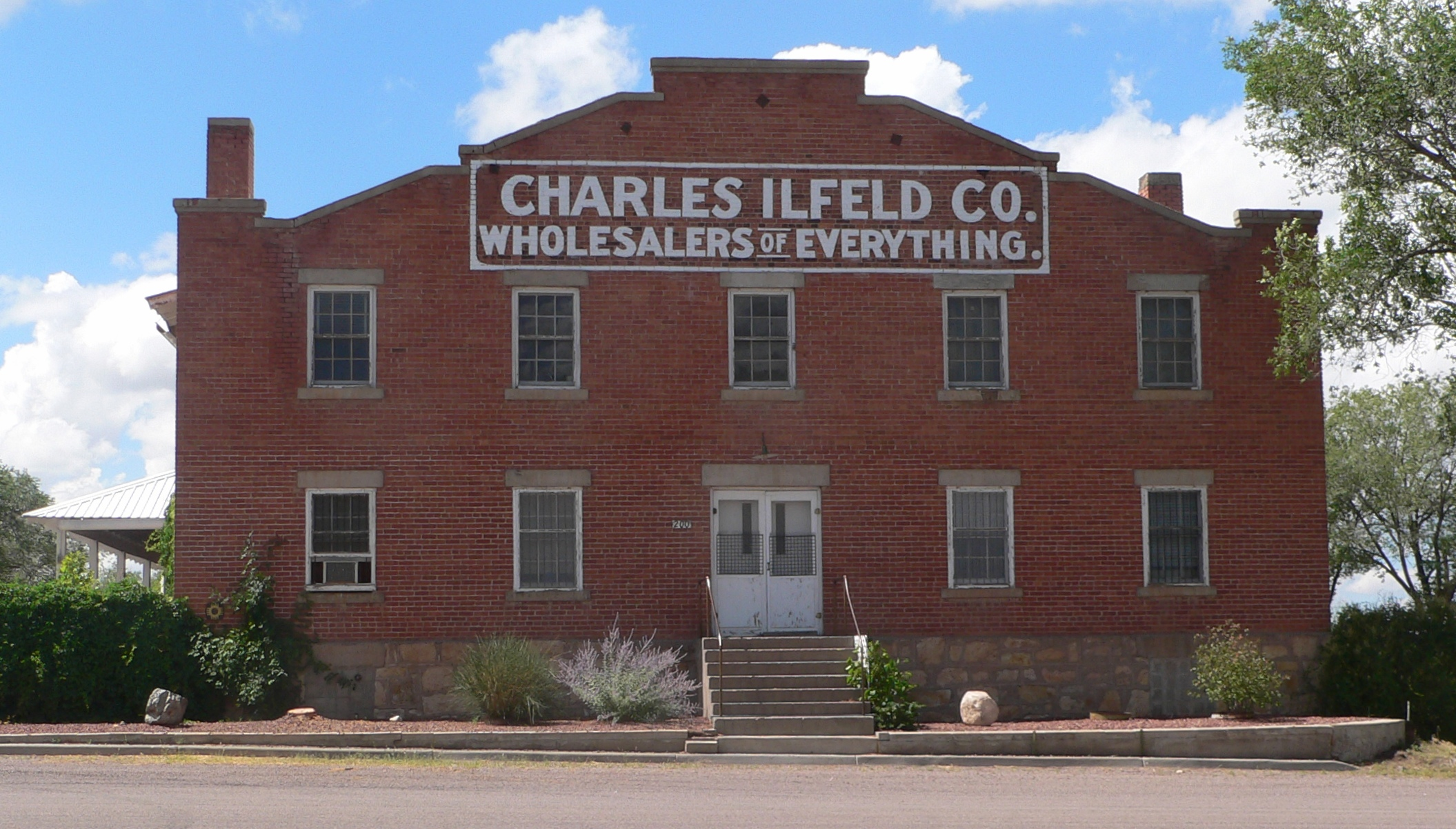

- Location within New Mexico Location within the United States
- Location: 200 N. Main St., Magdalena, New Mexico
- Coordinates: 34°07′06″N 107°14′40″W
- Area: less than one acre
- Built: 1913
- Architectural style: Mission/spanish Revival
- MPS: Magdalena MRA
- NRHP reference No.: 82003332
- Added to NRHP: August 2, 1982

The Ilfeld Warehouse, on Main St. in Magdalena, New Mexico, was built in 1913. It was listed on the National Register of Historic Places in 1982.

It is a two-story red brick building upon a stone foundation, with a stepped parapet on its street side. It originally had a railroad siding adjacent.

It is located at 200 N. Main St.
