= James Clemens Jr. =

- Born: October 29, 1791; Danville, Kentucky
- Died: January 12, 1878 (aged 86); St. Louis, Missouri
- Occupations: Businessman, banker

James Clemens Jr. (October 29, 1791 – January 12, 1878) was an American businessman and banker.

== Early life and family ==
Clemens Jr. was the second son of four children of Jeremiah Clemens (Loudoun County, Virginia, September 16, 1763 – Danville, Boyle County, Kentucky, June 8, 1826), and wife (m. ca 1788) Jane Cochran (1764 – April 7, 1821). They went to Kentucky (then the District of Kentucky, Virginia) in 1787, where he operated "The Big Black Horse" tavern in Danville. His older brother Thomas Clemens (February 27, 1790 – July 30, 1826) died unmarried and without issue. His younger sisters were Elizabeth Clemens (1802 – living 1878) married with Charles Caldwell, and Isabella Clemens, married in 1833 with Thomas Reed.

== Career ==
He started his career engaged in mercantile business with his uncle James Clemens Sr. in Huntsville, Madison County, Alabama (then in Mississippi Territory). He then moved to Missouri, then part of Missouri Territory, in 1816, where he became a successful storekeeper. Later he became active in banking. He did much to help the family of Mark Twain, of whom he was a relative.

In 1859, he had the Clemens House built in St. Louis, Missouri.
