= Magdalena station =

- Atchison, Topeka and Santa Fe Railway Depot
- U.S. National Register of Historic Places
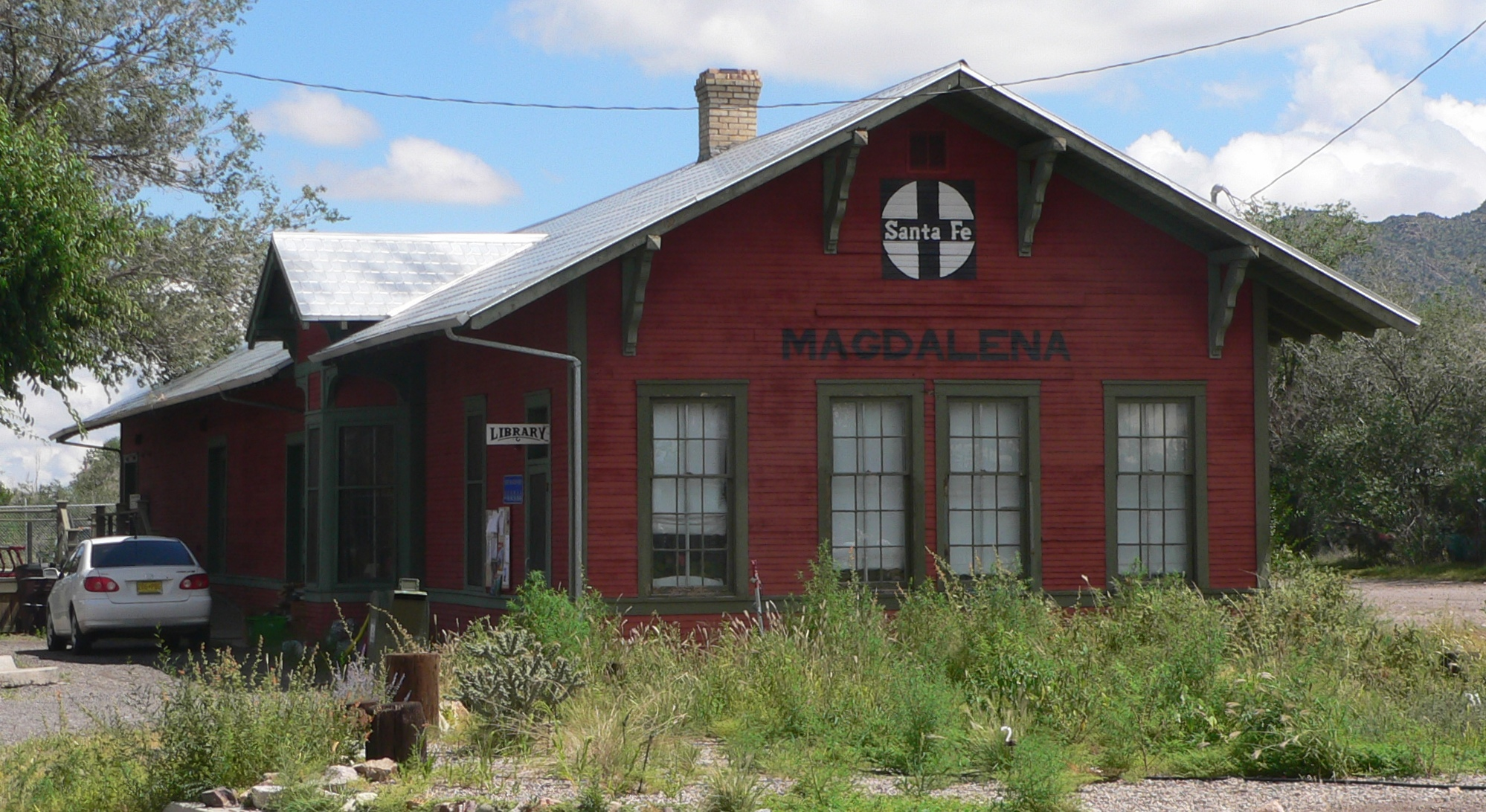

- Location within New Mexico
- Location: Off U.S. 60, Magdalena, New Mexico
- Coordinates: 34°07′06″N 107°14′36″W
- Area: 1 acre (0.40 ha)
- Built: 1915
- NRHP reference No.: 78001829
- Added to NRHP: December 29, 1978

The Atchison, Topeka and Santa Fe Railway Depot in Magdalena, New Mexico was listed on the National Register of Historic Places in 1978.

It is located at 108 North Main Street, located off U.S. Route 60.

It was built around 1915.

The station was central to the town, which was founded in 1884–1885 when the Atchison, Topeka and Santa Fe Railroad arrived to terminate a branch line from Socorro to there. It was to serve freight traffic of livestock and mining businesses.

The railway's tracks of the entire branch were removed in 1973 after freight traffic declined. In 1978 the depot was Magdalena's village hall, and "almost the only railroad building remaining to recall the town's hey-day when it was the shipping point for large quantities of ore, livestock and wool and one of western New Mexico's most important communities."

In 2013 it was the village hall and library
