= Val Verde Hotel =

- U.S. National Register of Historic Places
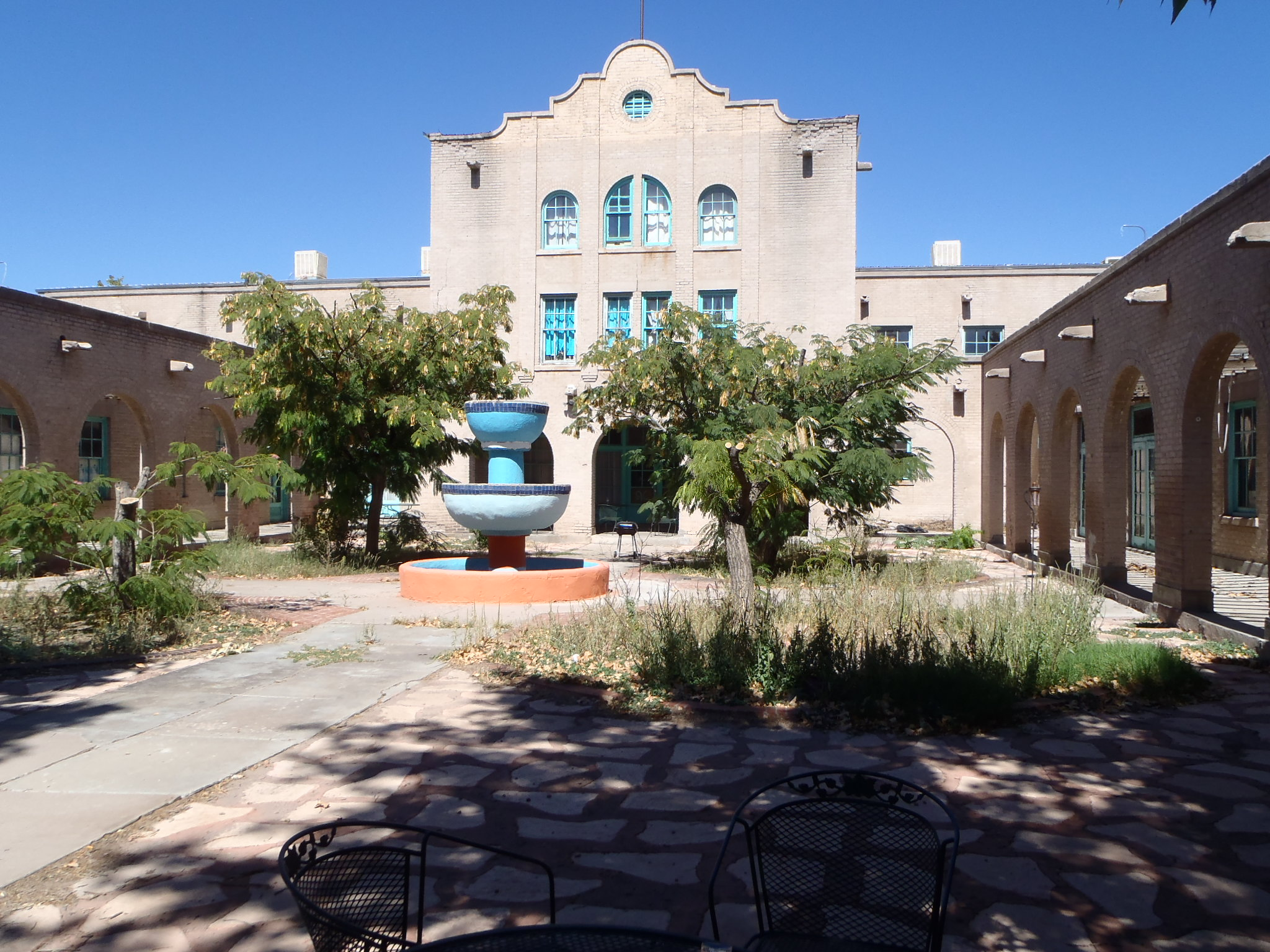

- Location within New Mexico
- Location: 203 Manzanares St., Socorro, New Mexico
- Coordinates: 34°03′28″N 106°53′22″W
- Area: 0.5 acres (0.20 ha)
- Built: 1919
- Architect: Trost & Trost
- Architectural style: Mission/spanish Revival
- NRHP reference No.: 77000930
- Added to NRHP: September 13, 1977

The Val Verde Hotel, at 203 Manzanares St. in Socorro, New Mexico, was built in 1919. It was listed on the National Register of Historic Places in 1977.

It is a 140 by 140 feet (43 m × 43 m) U-shaped building, built of yellow concrete brick. It was designed in Mission Revival/Spanish Revival style, probably by architects Trost & Trost .
