= Fitch House (Tuscaloosa, Alabama) =

- U.S. National Register of Historic Places
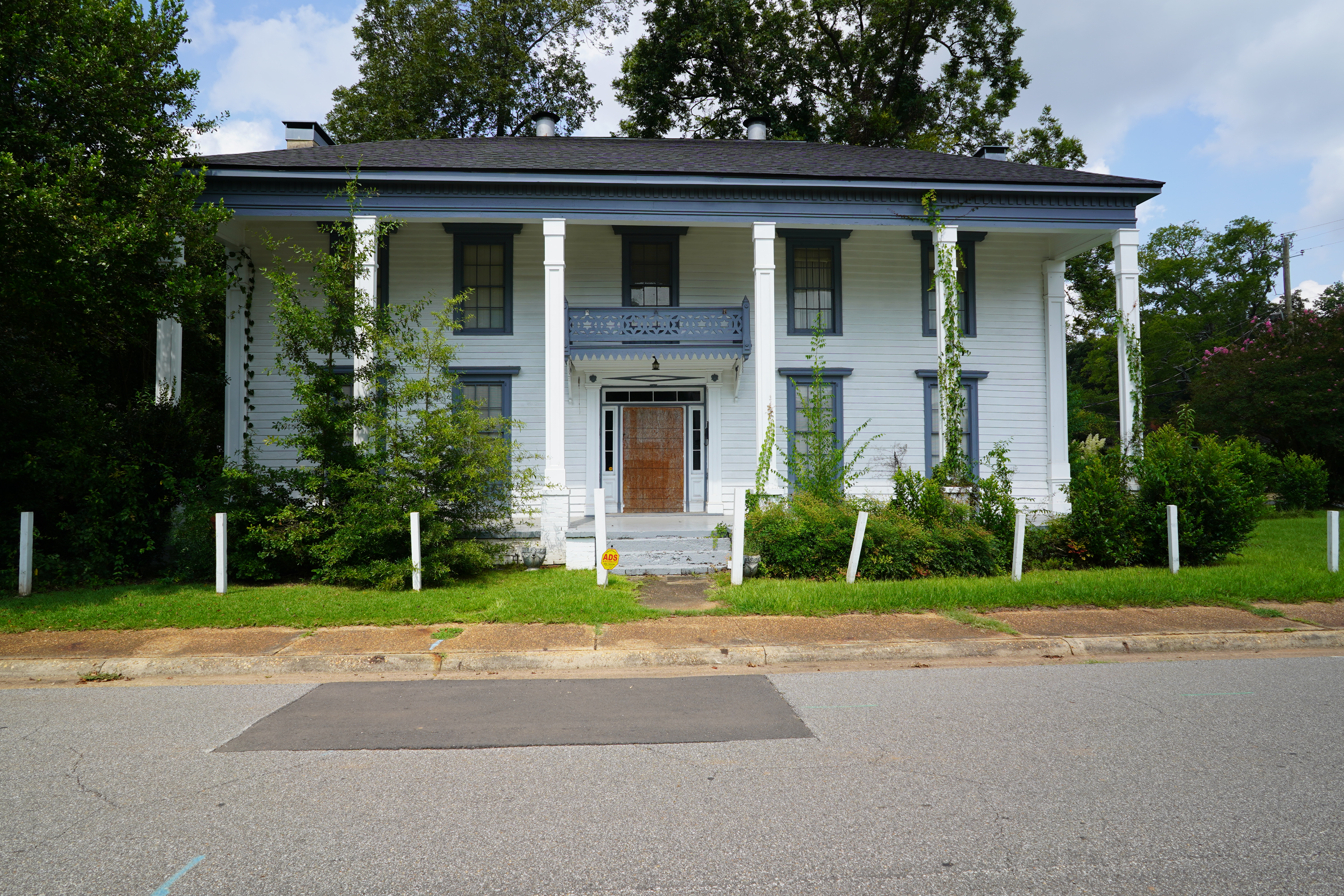

- Location within Alabama Location within the United States
- Location: 3404 Sixth St., Tuscaloosa, Alabama
- Coordinates: 33°12′21″N 87°34′50″W
- Area: 0.7 acres (0.28 ha)
- Built: c. 1830
- Built by: John S. Fitch
- Architectural style: Greek Revival
- NRHP reference No.: 87001027
- Added to NRHP: July 22, 1987

The Fitch House in Tuscaloosa, Alabama, at 3404 Sixth St., was built around 1830. It was listed on the National Register of Historic Places in 1987.

It is a two-story two-room deep house with a two-story full-length porch. Its earliest portion, built around 1830, was a frame, two-story, one-room deep side hall and parlor house. It was expanded and modified later, perhaps around 1860 or even as late as around 1880, into its Greek Revival form. There is an "Eastlake-inspired projecting second-floor balcony" which was added around 1880.

It is significant in part for its association with master builder and carpenter John S. Fitch, who built and lived in the house.

== John S. Fitch ==
John S. Fitch a carpenter born in Norwich, Connecticut on October 15, 1792. Fitch was hired by the architect William Nichols to do the carpentry work in the new state capitol to be built in Tuscaloosa, 1827–1831. Fitch is also attributed for designing and building the 1832 Tuscaloosa County Courthouse. John Fitch built his own house several blocks from the state capitol around 1827. The most outstanding feature of the Fitch House is the elliptical stairway supported by an internal system at cantilevered joists. This construction technique is associated with grand stairways found in public buildings of the period, but not in domestic structures. Fitch has successfully scaled down the size of the stairway while retaining the sophistication of the design. The graceful stairway is very different from the heavy and massive architecture of the period so prevalent in Tuscaloosa. The stairway is one of the finest examples of residential stairways in the state. Another unique feature of the Fitch House is the mantel located in the original front west parlor. The turned-spool design is a variation of the popular type of Federal style found in pattern books of the period. The presence of an overmantel is a unique occurrence in Alabama, with only one other known example of an early overmantel in existence.
