= Charles C. Fitch Farmstead =

- U.S. National Register of Historic Places
- U.S. Historic district
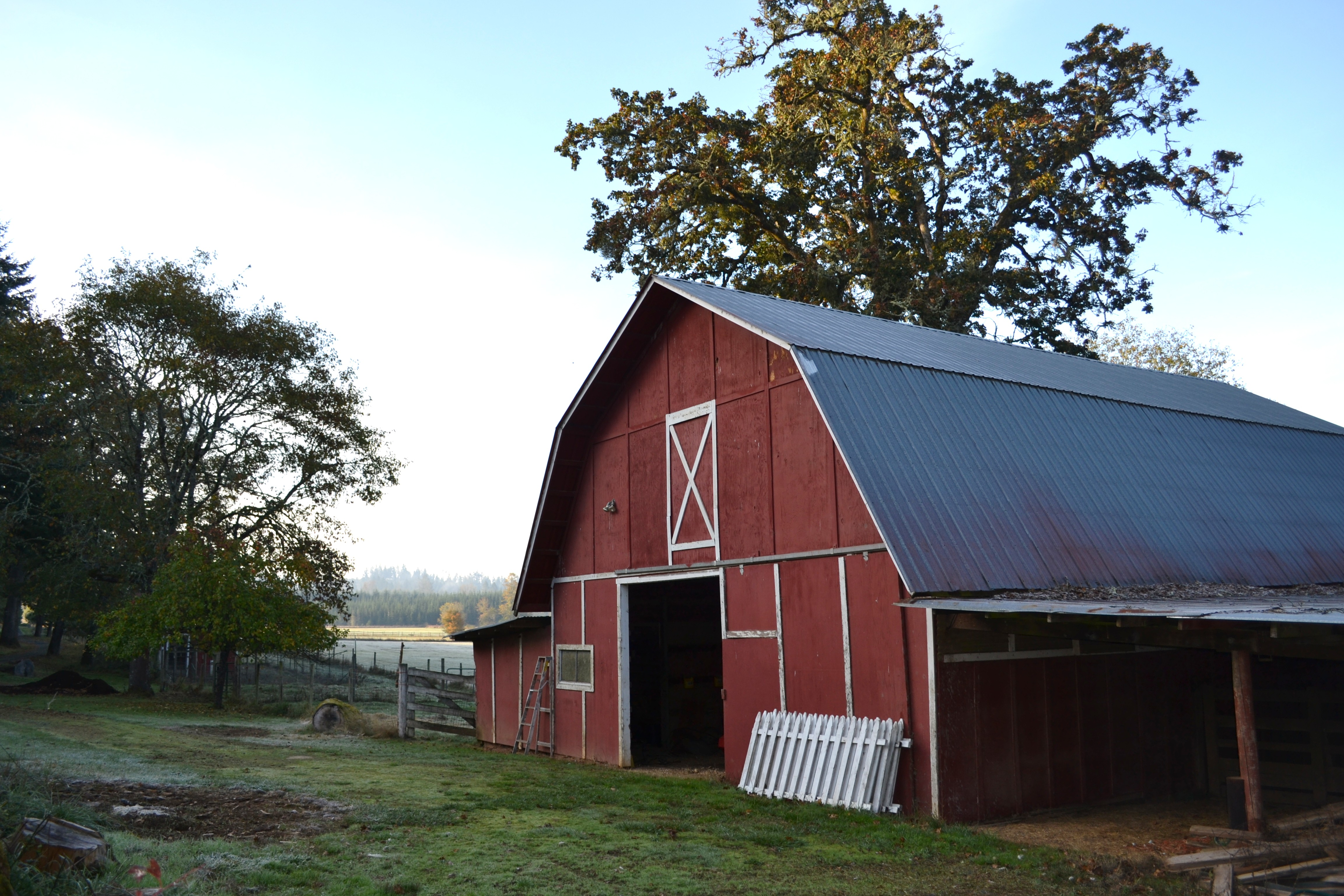
- Charles C. Fitch Farmstead in 2011

- Location within Oregon Location within the United States
- Nearest city: Eugene, Oregon
- Coordinates: 44°1′47″N 123°16′51″W
- Area: 7.2 acres (2.9 ha)
- Built: 1914, 1926, 1930
- Built by: Charles C. Fitch, Burr E. and Valley A. Finch
- Architectural style: American craftsman/Vernacular
- NRHP reference No.: 89000510
- Added to NRHP: 16 June 1989

The Charles C. Fitch Farmstead is a historic farm property located in rural Lane County, Oregon. It was listed as a historic district on the National Register of Historic Places (NRHP) on June 16, 1989.

== Description and history ==
The property nominated for listing on the NRHP is the remaining 7.22 acres (2.92 ha) of Charles Fitch's 1902 78-acre (32 ha) farmstead. It constitutes the functional center of the farming operation conducted on the land for decades. It represents a well preserved example of farming practices in western Lane County. The postal address is 26689 Pickens Road, Eugene, Oregon 97402. The property is about 9 miles (14 km) west of the city, accessed by a private road running northeast for about .66 miles (1.06 km) and culminating in a historic driveway which gives access to the building complex, orchard, garden plot and hay field/pasture.

Nine historic buildings, including a 1914 American Craftsman style farmhouse, are on the property. A feeder barn, fruit house and fuel house were built in 1926 and in 1930 a garage and shop, machine shed, and chicken house were constructed. These buildings are in a state of good repair and of original construction. Three other outbuildings on the property are in disrepair but reflect the scale and variety of the agricultural operation. They are a smokehouse, a bee–hive house, and an outhouse. The farmhouse was designed and built by Charles Fitch and the others by his son and daughter in law, Burr Edson and Valley Agnes (Storey) Fitch. Most of the wood for construction of all these buildings was harvested and sawmilled on the property.

The property was heavily timbered on August 9, 1902 when Fitch purchased Lot 5 in Section 3 of Township 18 South, Range West of Willamette Meridian. This consisted of 2.6 acres (1.1 ha) and adjoining property of 76 acres (31 ha). The harvest and sawmilling of the timber on the property provided material for construction and lumber for sale as well as clearing the land for farming. The farmstead had a wide range of agricultural production, grains and hay were complemented by vegetables and a fruit orchard. Bees were kept to pollinate the fruit and animal husbandry included a large chicken coop as well as several head of cattle and some hogs.

Elevation at the house is 450 feet (140 m). The mean annual temperature is 52 to 54 °F (11 to 12 °C) and precipitation 40 to 50 inches (100 to 130 cm). The soil is classed 2E for agricultural use by the United States Department of Agriculture on a scale of 1 to 8 with 1 being most productive. The land lays nearly level to gradual stream terraces and low foothills with elevation varying from 300 to 600 ft (91 to 183 m)

== See also ==
- Historic preservation
- History of agriculture in the United States
- Homestead Acts
- National Register of Historic Places listings in Lane County, Oregon
