= Clemens Ranchhouse =

- U.S. National Register of Historic Places
- Location within New Mexico
- Nearest city: Magdalena, New Mexico
- Coordinates: 34°05′03″N 107°13′46″W
- Area: 3.7 acres (1.5 ha)
- Built: 1910
- NRHP reference No.: 79001557
- Added to NRHP: April 18, 1979

The Clemens Ranchhouse, near Magdalena, New Mexico, was built in 1910. It was listed on the National Register of Historic Places in 1979.

It was deemed "A splendid example of Railroad Era architecture in New Mexico".

It is located south of Magdalena, at the foot of Magdalena Peak, facing east towards the former mining town of Kelly.

In 1978, it served as the headquarters of a 7,000 acres (28 km^{2}) cattle ranch.
