= A.B. Baca House =

- A. B. Baca House
- U.S. National Register of Historic Places
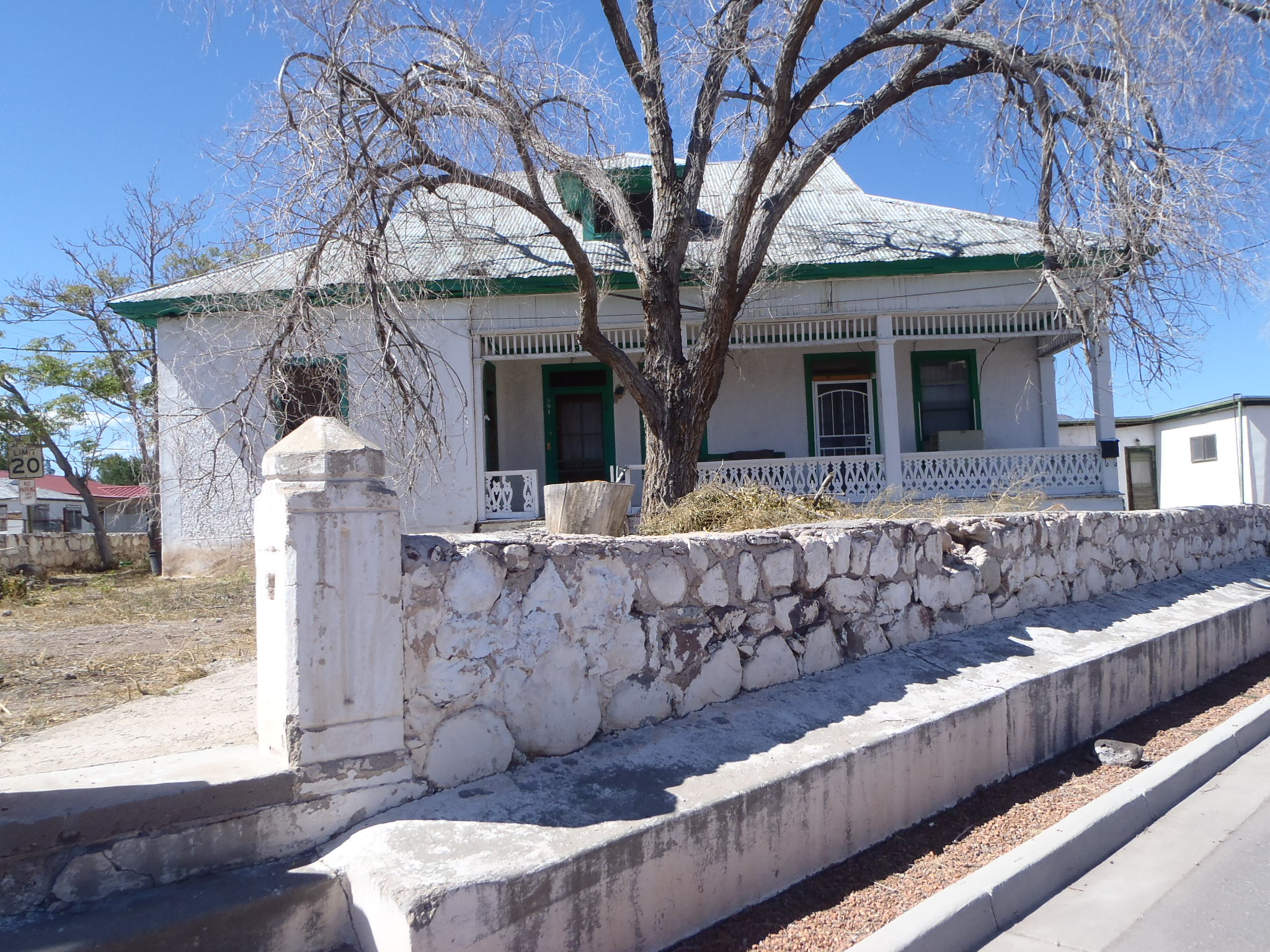

- Location within New Mexico Location within the United States
- Location: 201 School of Mines Rd., Socorro, New Mexico
- Coordinates: 34°03′31″N 106°53′38″W
- Area: less than one acre
- Built: 1910
- Built by: Abel Trujillo, Jesus Martinez
- Architectural style: Hipped box
- MPS: Domestic Architecture in Socorro MPS
- NRHP reference No.: 91000036
- Added to NRHP: February 20, 1991

The A. B. Baca House, at 201 School of Mines Rd. in Socorro, New Mexico, was built in 1910. It was listed on the National Register of Historic Places in 1991.

It is a "Hipped box", an example of Territorial Style. It was built by Abel Trujillo and Jesus Martinez.

It was deemed notable as "a well-maintained, late-Territorial, hip-roofed, cubic adobe dwelling. It combines local craftsmanship with a plan, roof design, and decorative elements brought from the Midwest."
