= Anthony Cortesy House =

- U.S. National Register of Historic Places
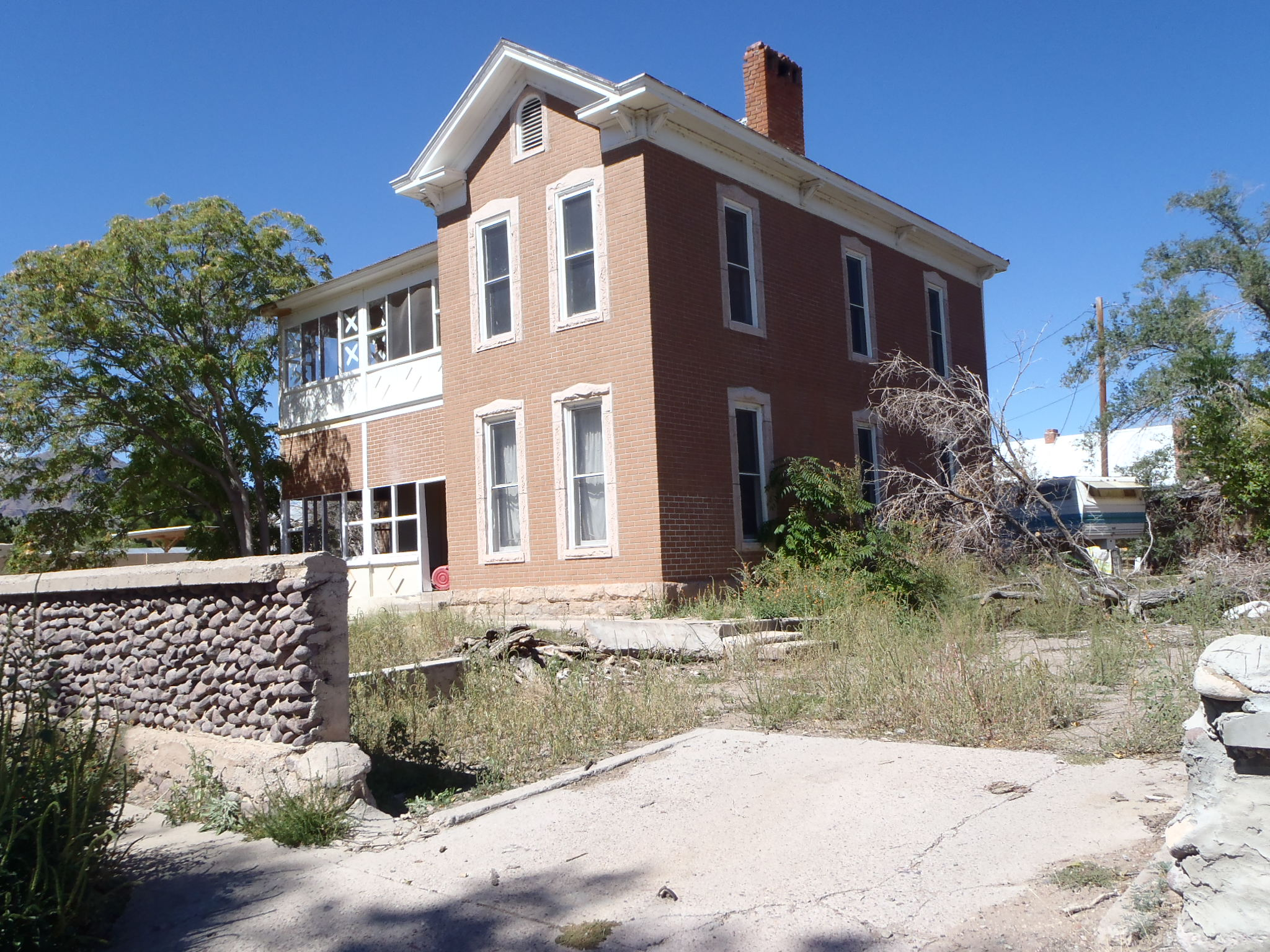

- Location within New Mexico
- Location: 327 McCutcheon Ave., Socorro, New Mexico
- Coordinates: 34°03′19″N 106°53′46″W
- Area: less than one acre
- Built: 1893
- Architectural style: Late Victorian, Vernacular brick
- MPS: Domestic Architecture in Socorro MPS
- NRHP reference No.: 91000033
- Added to NRHP: February 20, 1991

The Anthony Cortesy House, at 327 McCutcheon Ave. in Socorro, New Mexico, was built in 1893. It was listed on the National Register of Historic Places in 1991.

It is a two-story brick building, built as a house and having two one-story porches at an early date. Later the porches were replaced by two-story ones, and the building was divided into apartments.
