= Juan Antonio Garcia House =

Historic house in New Mexico, United States

- U.S. National Register of Historic Places
- NM State Register of Cultural Properties
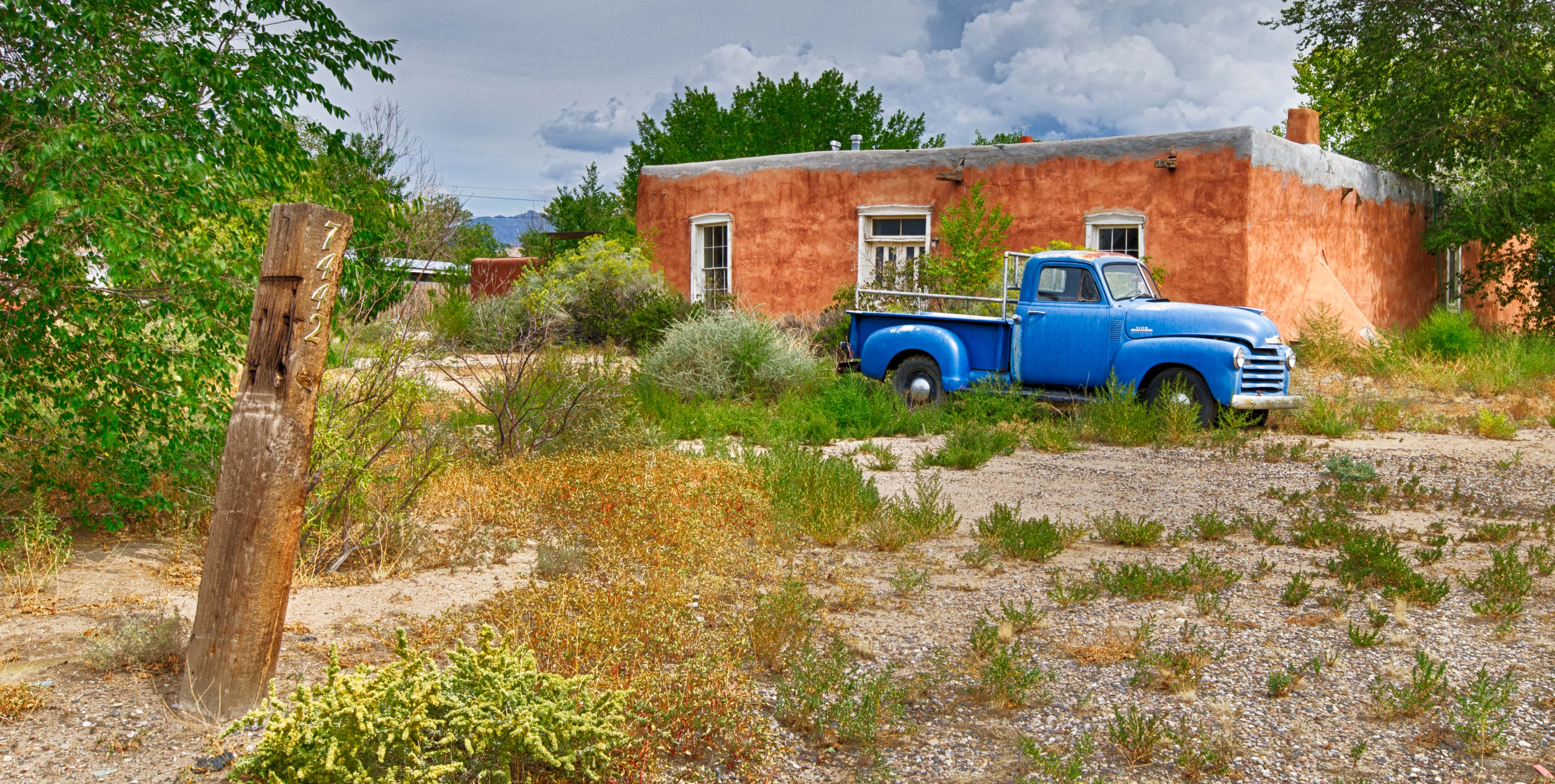

- Location within New Mexico Location within the United States
- Location: 7442 Edith Blvd., NE, Albuquerque, New Mexico
- Coordinates: 35°9′48″N 106°37′5″W
- Area: 1 acre (0.40 ha)
- Built: 1860; 166 years ago
- Built by: Garcia, Juan Antonio
- Architectural style: Middle Territorial
- MPS: Albuquerque North Valley MRA
- NRHP reference No.: 82003311
- NMSRCP No.: 471

Significant dates
- Added to NRHP: September 28, 1982
- Designated NMSRCP: August 27, 1976

The Juan Antonio Garcia House in the North Valley area of Albuquerque, New Mexico dates from 1860. It was a farmhouse built by Juan Antonio Garcia. It was listed on the National Register of Historic Places in 1982. It has also been known as Tappan House.
