= Clemens House-Columbia Brewery District =

Historic house in Missouri, United States

- Clemens House--Columbia Brewery District
- U.S. National Register of Historic Places
- U.S. Historic district
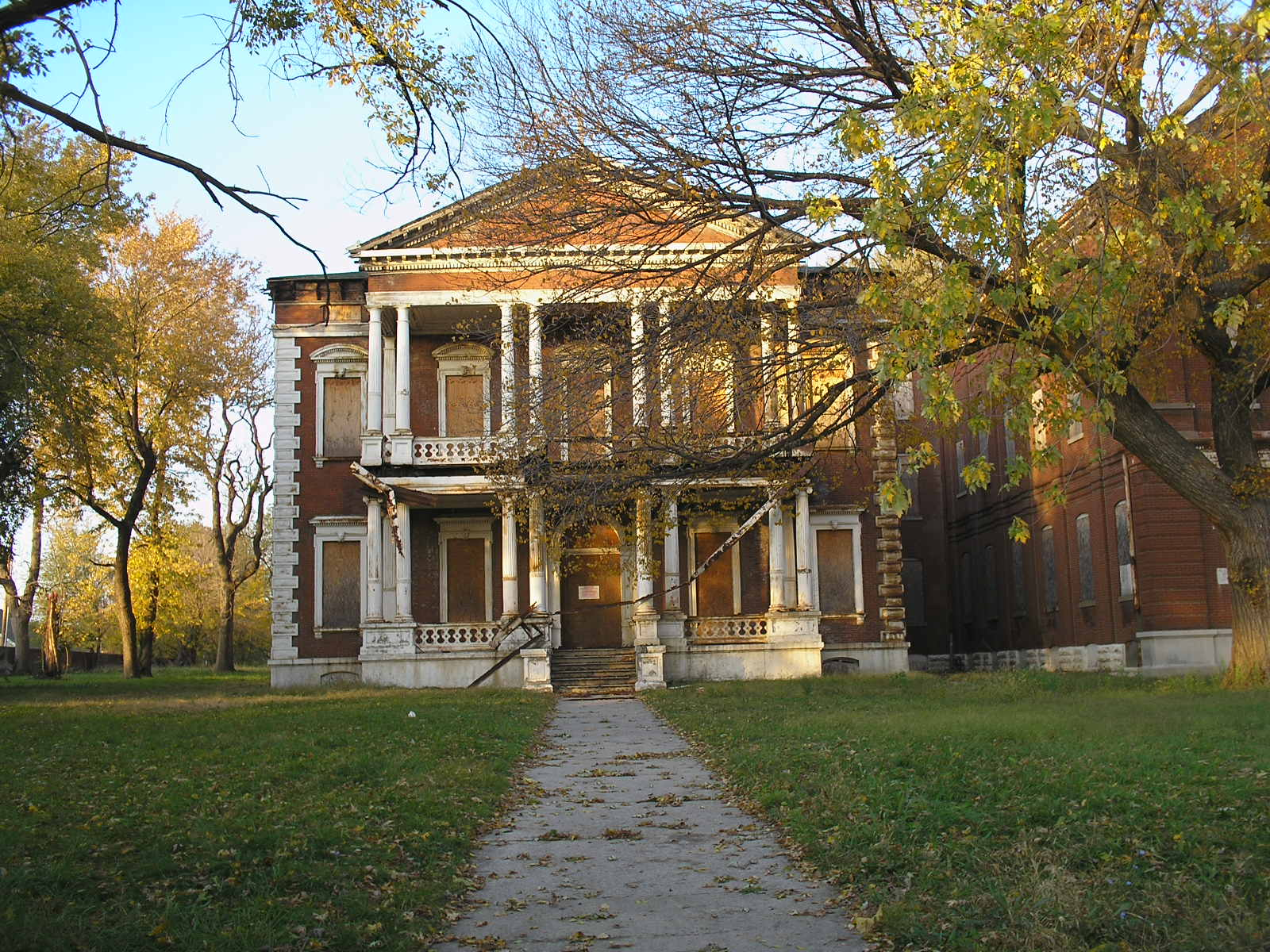
- The Clemens House in 2005

- Location within St. Louis Location within Missouri Location within the United States
- Location: Original district roughly bounded by Maiden Lane, Cass Ave., Twenty-first, Helen, and Howard Sts., and boundary increase roughkly bounded by St. Louis Ave., N. Florissant Ave., Maiden Lane, and N. Twenty-first and N. Twentyieth Sts. St. Louis, Missouri
- Coordinates: 38°38′41″N 90°12′33″W
- Built: 1868
- Architect: Multiple
- Architectural style: Mid 19th Century Revival, Late 19th And 20th Century Revivals, Romanesque, Late Victorian
- Demolished: 2017
- NRHP reference No.: 84002622 (original), 86001929 (boundary increase)
- Added to NRHP: July 19, 1984

Clemens House—Columbia Brewery District is a historic district in St. Louis, Missouri. Bounded by Maiden Lane, Cass Ave., Twenty-first, Helen, and Howard Sts., the district was added to the National Register of Historic Places in 1984.

A boundary increase, roughly bounded by St. Louis Ave., N. Florissant Ave., Maiden Lane, and N. Twenty-first and N. Twentieth Sts. was added in 1986. The district includes single dwellings, at least one religious structure and manufacturing facilities.

Architectural styles include Mid 19th Century Revival, Late 19th And 20th Century Revivals, Romanesque and Late Victorian.

The House was buit for banker and millionaire James Clemens Jr. (1791-1878) and his children. In the 20th century, the house was owned by several religious orders and abandoned in 2000. The house was gutted by fire in 2017 and subsequently demolished.
