= House at 303 Eaton Avenue =

- U.S. National Register of Historic Places
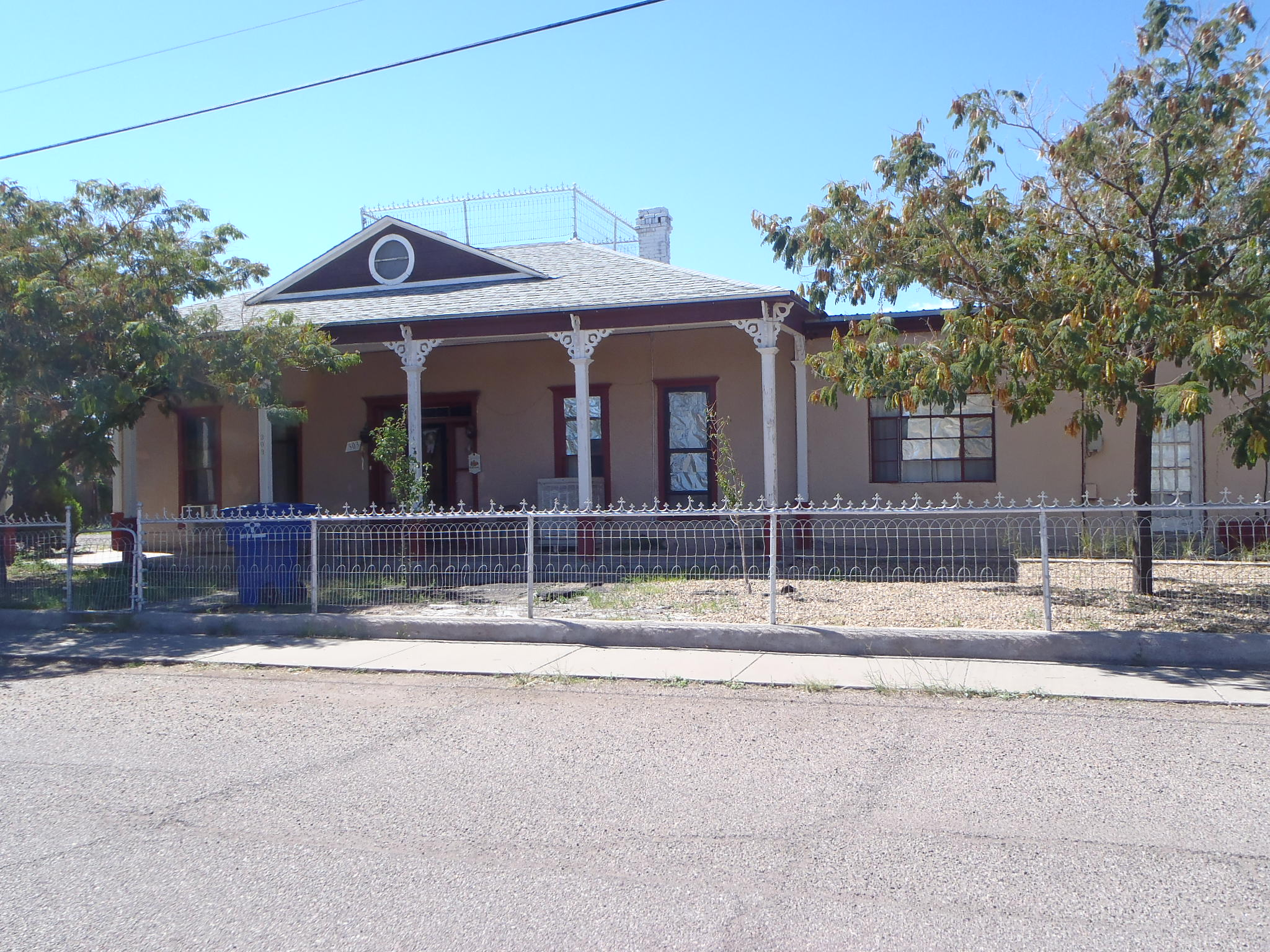

- Location within New Mexico
- Location: 303 Eaton Ave., Socorro, New Mexico
- Coordinates: 34°03′20″N 106°53′50″W
- Area: less than one acre
- Built: 1893
- Architectural style: Late Victorian, Vernacular territorial
- MPS: Domestic Architecture in Socorro MPS
- NRHP reference No.: 91000032
- Added to NRHP: February 20, 1991

The House at 303 Eaton Avenue, in Socorro, New Mexico, was built in 1893 and was listed on the National Register of Historic Places in 1991.

Its architecture is Late Victorian and vernacular Territorial Style.

It is a one-story adobe house, with a Territorial Style portico across its front. The portal includes chamfered posts with decorative Victorian scrolled brackets.
