= Clemens House (Huntsville, Alabama) =

- U.S. National Register of Historic Places
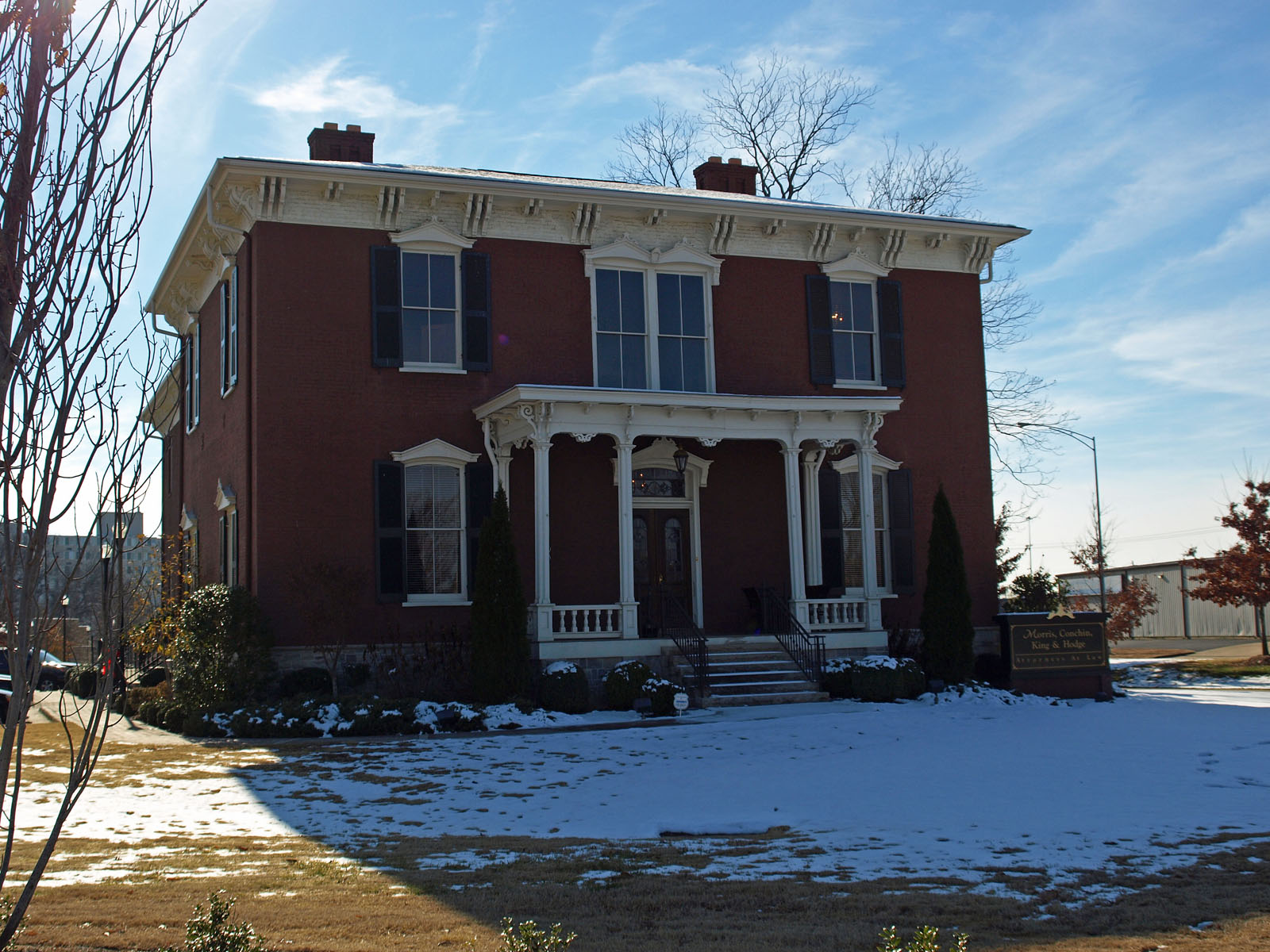
- The Clemens House in December 2010

- Location within Huntsville, Alabama Location within Alabama Location within the United States
- Location: Pratt Ave. at Meridian St., Huntsville, Alabama
- Coordinates: 34°44′19″N 86°35′3″W
- Built: 1835
- NRHP reference No.: 74000419
- Added to NRHP: October 16, 1974

The Clemens House in Huntsville, Alabama was built in 1835. It was listed on the National Register of Historic Places in 1974. The house was originally located at the southeast corner of Clinton Avenue and Church Street, but was moved to the southeast corner of Pratt Avenue and Meridian Street in 2004.
