= Captain Michael Cooney House =

- U.S. National Register of Historic Places
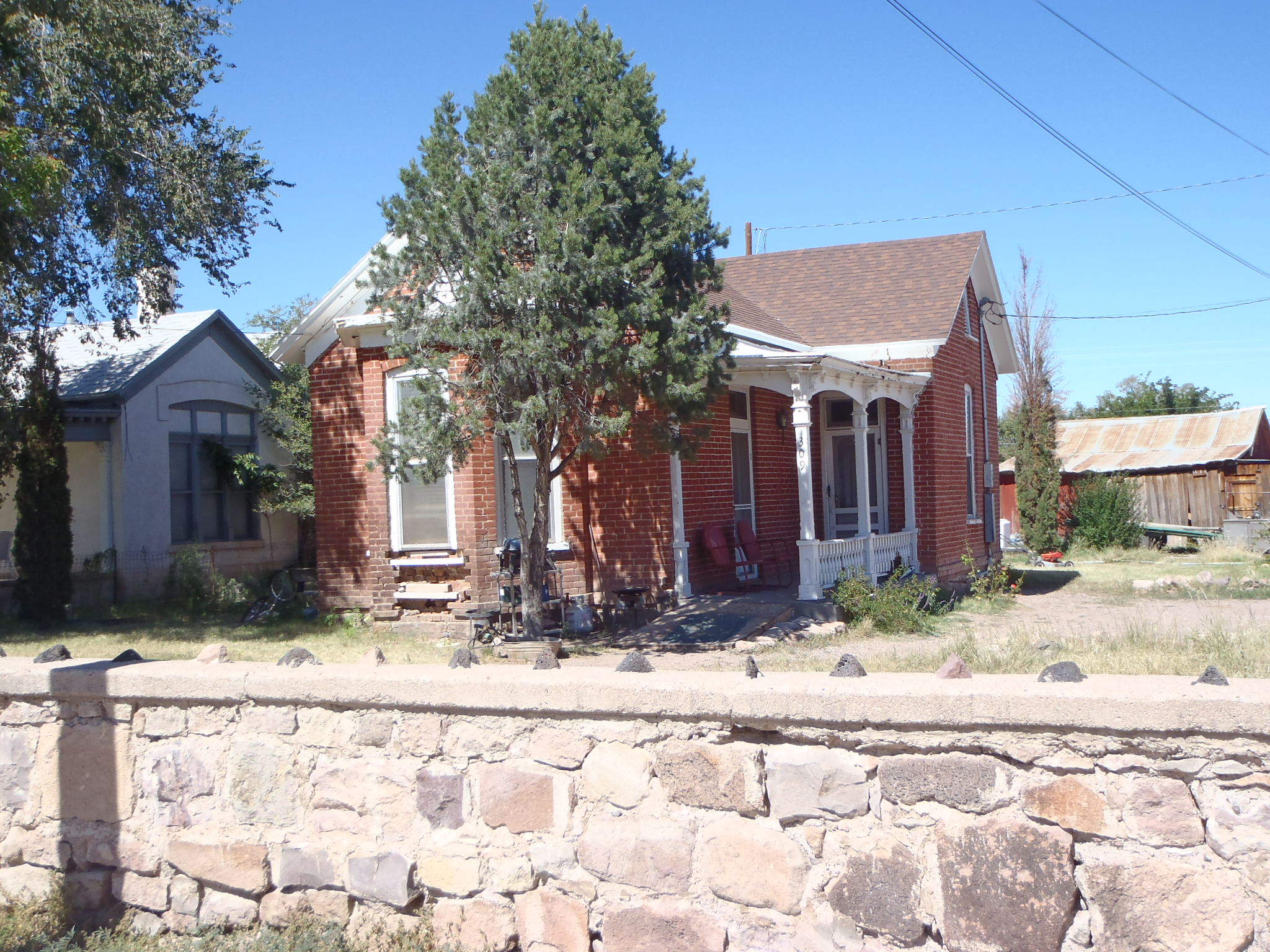

- Location within New Mexico
- Location: 309 McCutcheon Ave., Socorro, New Mexico
- Coordinates: 34°03′19″N 106°53′40″W
- Area: less than one acre
- Built: 1889
- Architectural style: Late Victorian, Vernacular brick
- MPS: Domestic Architecture in Socorro MPS
- NRHP reference No.: 91000029
- Added to NRHP: February 20, 1991

The Captain Michael Cooney House, at 309 McCutcheon Ave. in Socorro, New Mexico, was built in 1889. It was listed on the National Register of Historic Places in 1991.

It is a one-story red brick house. It has a front-facing gable and intersecting side gables, with a wooden entry porch in the ell between the front and east-facing wings. The porch has three chamfered posts and four-square posts with a balustrade of turned balusters.

A Sanborn fire insurance map recorded that the house, as of 1893, had a wood-shingled roof. By 1982, the roof was asphalt shingled.

The property, with house included, was bought for $700 by Michael Cooney in 1895. Michael Cooney had come "to the Socorro area in 1880 to take over the raining interests of his younger brother, James C. Cooney. In 1870, while stationed at Fort Bayard, the younger Cooney had discovered silver and copper ore in the Mogollon Mountains. Having been discharged from the military, he returned in 1876 to work his claim and continue prospecting. He organized the Cooney Mining District and the town of Cooney. Four years later James Cooney was killed by Apache Indians."
