= Bingham, New Mexico =

Settlement in New Mexico

Bingham is a populated place in Socorro County, New Mexico, United States. It lies at an elevation of 5,485 feet (1,671.828 m) along Highway 380, halfway between San Antonio and Carrizozo. It has had a post office since 1934, now located at 33°54′39″N 106°20′58″W.

== Climate ==
According to the Köppen Climate Classification system, Bingham has a cold semi-arid climate, abbreviated "BSk" on climate maps. The hottest temperature recorded in Bingham was 105 °F (40.6 °C) on June 22, 1983 and June 26, 1994, while the coldest temperature recorded was −13 °F (−25.0 °C) on February 3, 2011.

Climate data for Bingham, New Mexico, 1991–2020 normals, extremes 1939–present
Month	Jan	Feb	Mar	Apr	May	Jun	Jul	Aug	Sep	Oct	Nov	Dec	Year
Record high °F (°C)	70 (21)	79 (26)	91 (33)	90 (32)	100 (38)	105 (41)	104 (40)	101 (38)	98 (37)	92 (33)	80 (27)	71 (22)	105 (41)
Mean daily maximum °F (°C)	51.2 (10.7)	56.7 (13.7)	64.7 (18.2)	72.6 (22.6)	81.4 (27.4)	90.9 (32.7)	90.8 (32.7)	88.6 (31.4)	82.9 (28.3)	72.6 (22.6)	60.0 (15.6)	50.8 (10.4)	71.9 (22.2)
Daily mean °F (°C)	37.3 (2.9)	41.9 (5.5)	48.6 (9.2)	55.6 (13.1)	64.5 (18.1)	74.0 (23.3)	76.4 (24.7)	74.6 (23.7)	68.5 (20.3)	57.6 (14.2)	45.6 (7.6)	37.2 (2.9)	56.8 (13.8)
Mean daily minimum °F (°C)	23.3 (−4.8)	27.1 (−2.7)	32.5 (0.3)	38.7 (3.7)	47.7 (8.7)	57.0 (13.9)	62.0 (16.7)	60.7 (15.9)	54.2 (12.3)	42.6 (5.9)	31.1 (−0.5)	23.7 (−4.6)	41.7 (5.4)
Record low °F (°C)	−12 (−24)	−13 (−25)	2 (−17)	12 (−11)	22 (−6)	30 (−1)	45 (7)	47 (8)	25 (−4)	11 (−12)	6 (−14)	−6 (−21)	−13 (−25)
Average precipitation inches (mm)	0.43 (11)	0.56 (14)	0.44 (11)	0.33 (8.4)	0.36 (9.1)	0.76 (19)	2.36 (60)	1.79 (45)	1.39 (35)	1.14 (29)	0.57 (14)	0.71 (18)	10.84 (273.5)
Average precipitation days (≥ 0.01 in)	2.1	2.3	2.2	1.6	1.9	2.7	7.5	6.6	4.4	3.5	1.8	2.3	38.9
Source 1: NOAA
Source 2: xmACIS2
