= Lewellen House =

- U.S. National Register of Historic Places
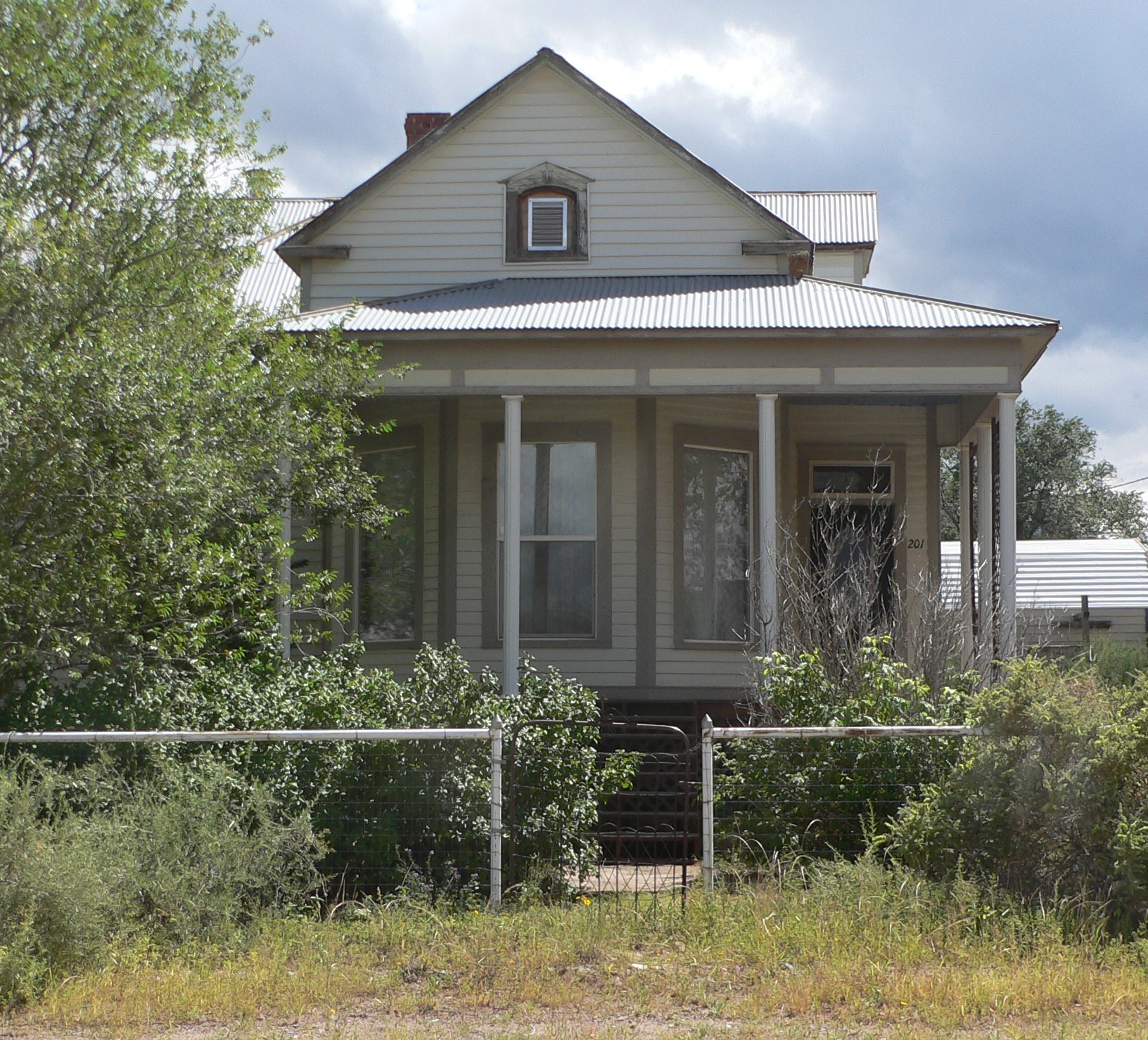

- Location within New Mexico
- Location: 2nd and Chestnut Sts., Magdalena, New Mexico
- Coordinates: 34°07′03″N 107°14′18″W
- Area: less than one acre
- NRHP reference No.: 82003333
- Added to NRHP: August 2, 1982

The Lewellen House, at 2nd and Chestnut Streets in Magdalena, New Mexico, was listed on the National Register of Historic Places in 1982.

It is a one-and-a-half-story wood-frame house with stucco exterior, with a complex hipped roof. It has a projecting front gable with a veranda on two sides, with modified Doric columns. Other Classical Revival elements include returned eaves and pediments on the house's dormers.
