= Juan Nepomuceno Garcia House =

- U.S. National Register of Historic Places
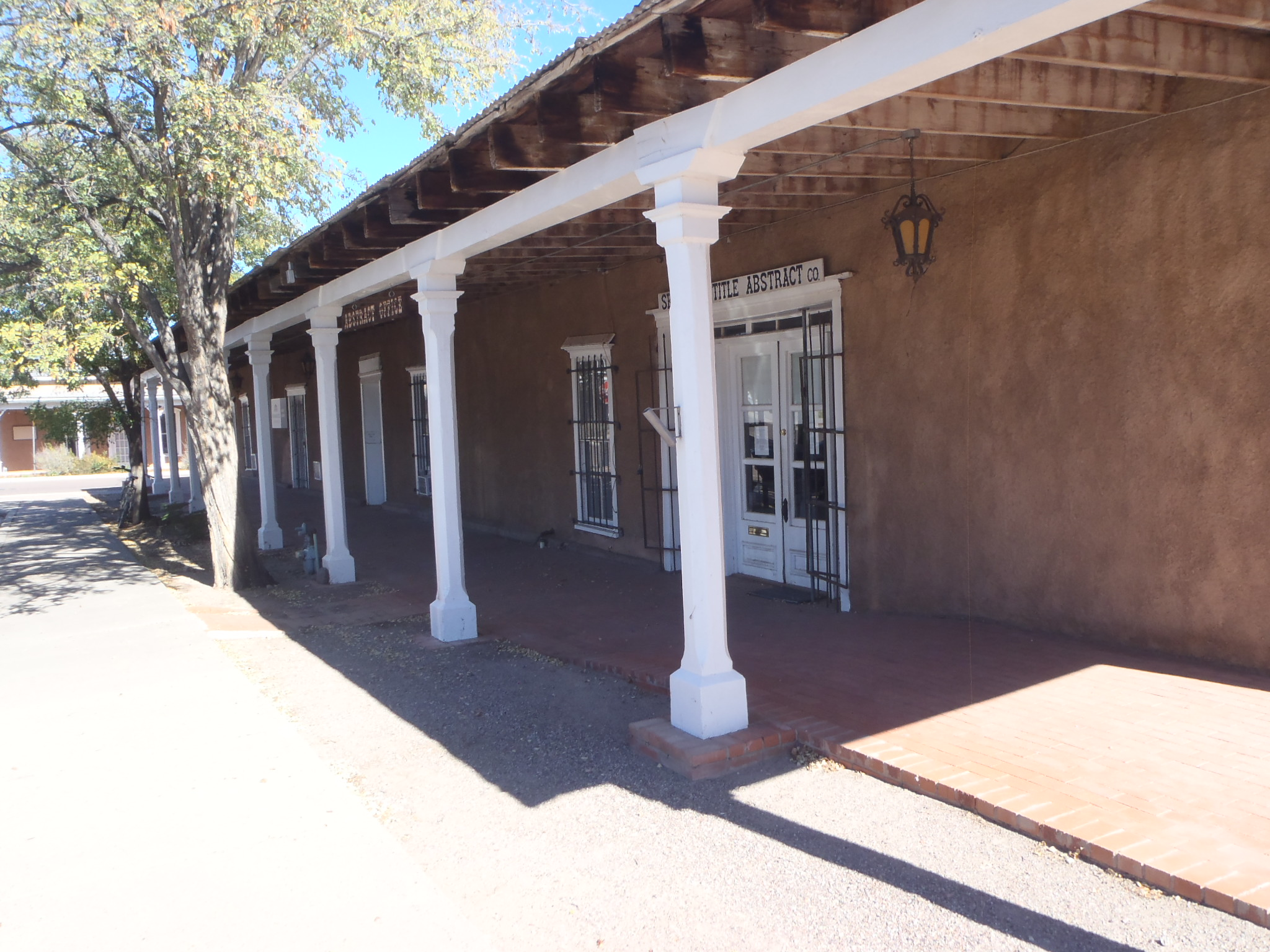

- Location within New Mexico
- Location: 108 Bernard St. Socorro, New Mexico
- Coordinates: 34°03′29″N 106°53′32″W
- Area: less than one acre
- Built: 1880
- Architectural style: Spanish Colonial
- MPS: Domestic Architecture in Socorro MPS
- NRHP reference No.: 91000027
- Added to NRHP: February 20, 1991

The Juan Nepomuceno Garcia House, at 108 Bernard St. in Socorro, New Mexico, dates from 1880. It was listed on the National Register of Historic Places in 1991.

it is a one-story, adobe, flat-roofed building facing onto a plaza. It has an interior placita (courtyard).

It is just south of the Juan Jose Baca House and Store.
