= Garcia Opera House =

- U.S. National Register of Historic Places
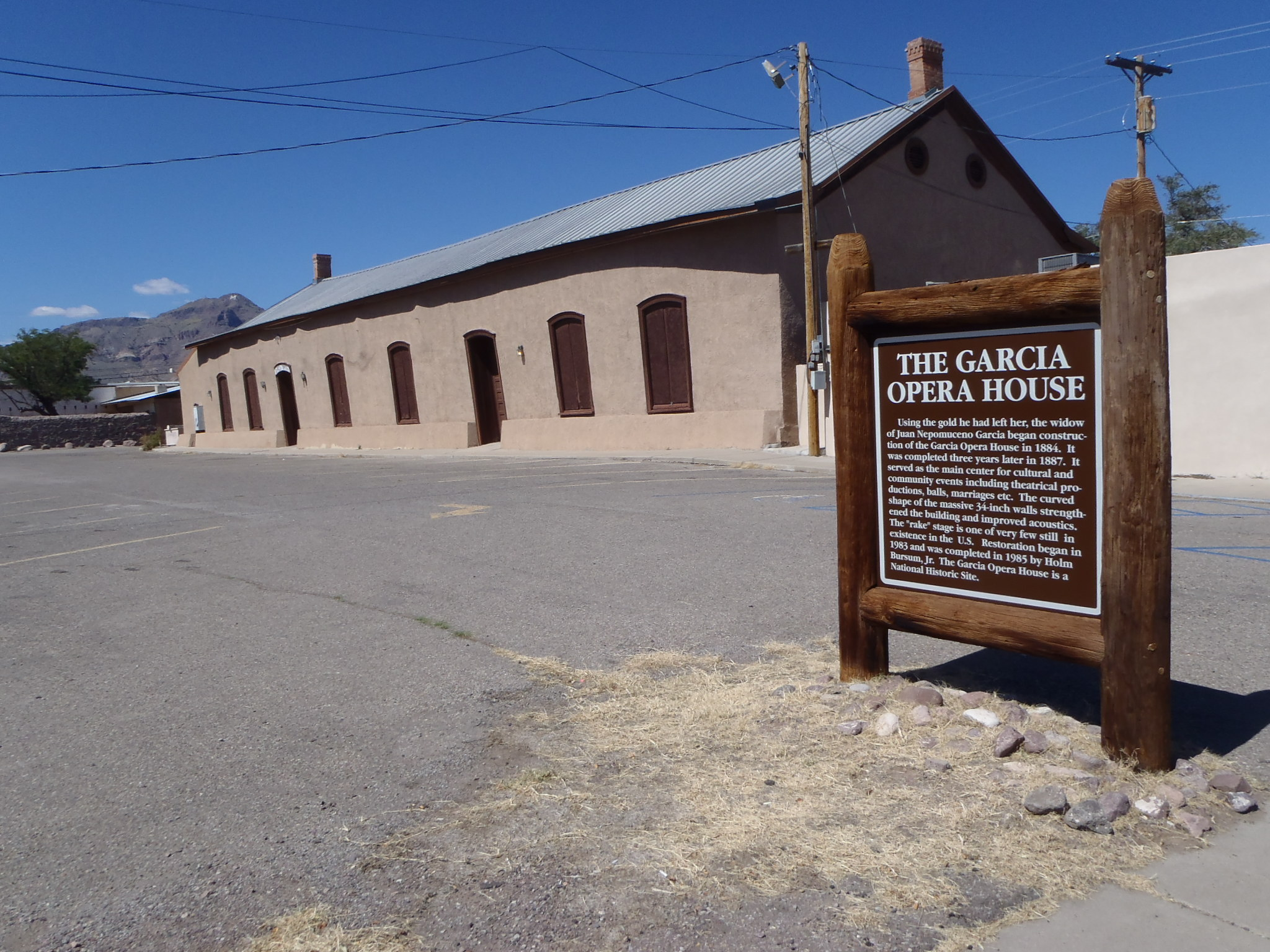

- Location within New Mexico
- Location: Terry Ave. and California St., Socorro, New Mexico
- Coordinates: 34°03′30″N 106°53′28″W
- Area: 1 acre (0.40 ha)
- Built: 1886
- NRHP reference No.: 74001210
- Added to NRHP: August 13, 1974

The Garcia Opera House, at Terry Ave. and California St. in Socorro, New Mexico was built in 1886. Its owner hoped to attract opera, but there is no record of any traveling opera company stopping. It did host travelling theatre performances, masked balls, and other functions.

It was listed on the National Register of Historic Places in 1974.
