= James Gurden Fitch House =

- U.S. National Register of Historic Places
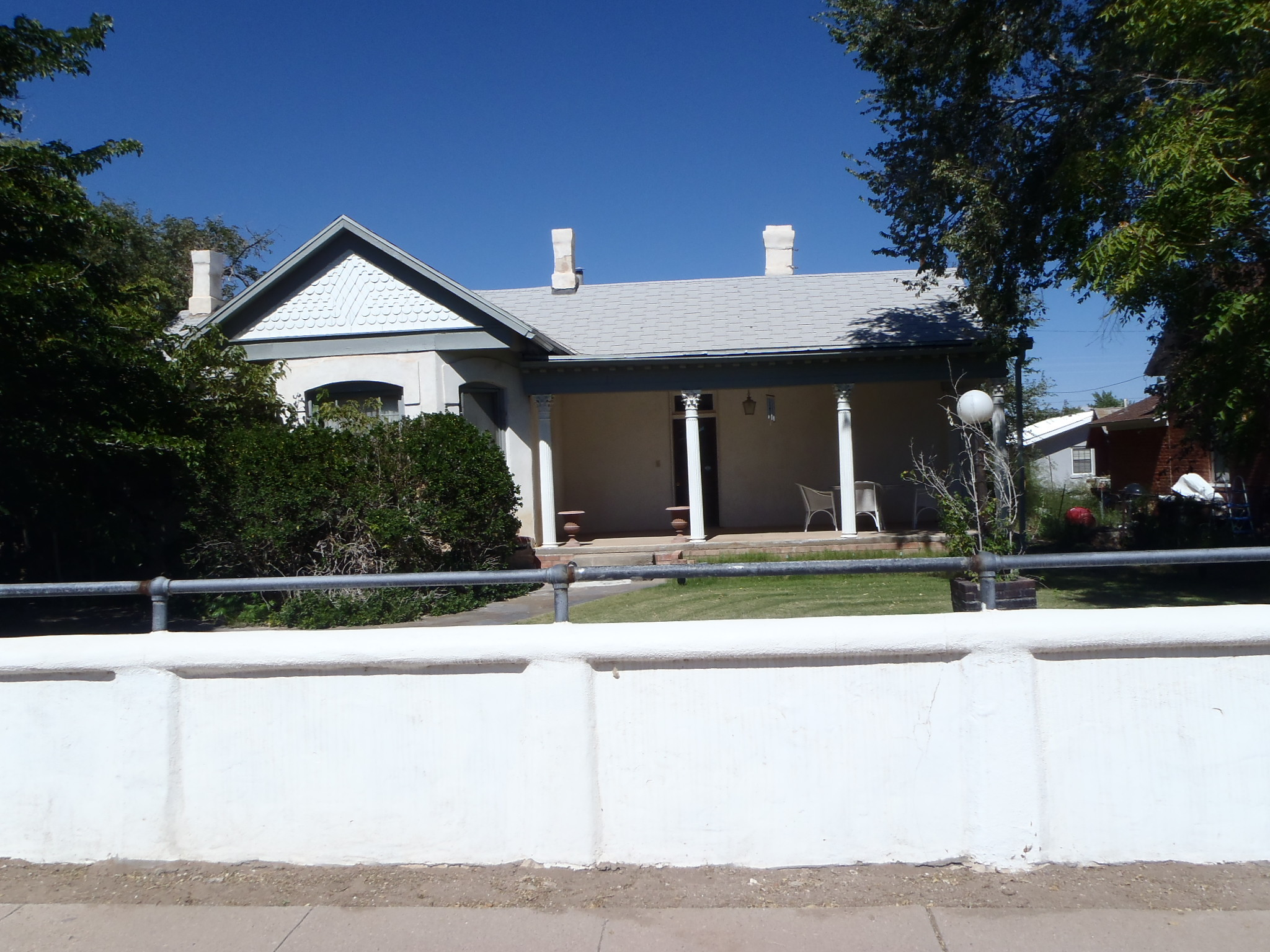

- Location within New Mexico
- Location: 311 McCutcheon Ave., Socorro, New Mexico
- Coordinates: 34°03′19″N 106°53′40″W
- Area: less than one acre
- Built: c.1893
- Architectural style: Italianate, Vernacular brick
- MPS: Domestic Architecture in Socorro MPS
- NRHP reference No.: 91000035
- Added to NRHP: February 20, 1991

The James Gurden Fitch House, at 311 McCutcheon Ave. in Socorro, New Mexico, was built around 1893. It was listed on the National Register of Historic Places in 1991.

It was deemed significant as follows:

Architecturally, the Fitch house is an example of the brick dwellings which were built on and near McCutcheon Avenue in the 1880s and early 1890s using new materials and styles brought by the railroad and reflecting the prosperity of Socorro's mining boom. The Neo-Classical porch columns added by the original owner are an unusual touch for Socorro and perhaps derive from the Classical influence that followed the Columbian Exposition of 1893. Historically it is significant as the home of James Gurden Fitch, one of Socorro's leading professional men of the late nineteenth and early twentieth centuries."
