= Magdalena, New Mexico =

Village in the United States

- Village
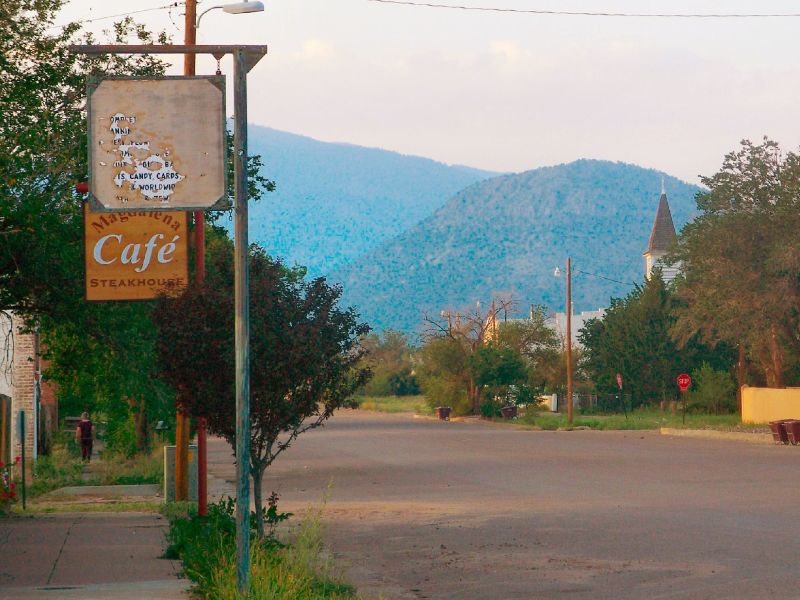
- Main Street in Magdalena (2007)

- Location within Socorro County and New Mexico
- Coordinates: 34°07′25″N 107°14′10″W
- Country: United States
- State: New Mexico
- County: Socorro

Area
  - Total: 6.22 sq mi (16.12 km^{2})
  - Land: 6.22 sq mi (16.12 km^{2})
  - Water: 0 sq mi (0.00 km^{2})
- Elevation: 6,664 ft (2,031 m)

Population (2020)
  - Total: 806
  - Density: 130/sq mi (50/km^{2})
- Time zone: UTC-7 (Mountain (MST))
  - Summer (DST): UTC-6 (MDT)
- ZIP code: 87825
- Area code: 575
- FIPS code: 35-46310
- GNIS ID: 2413570
- Website: villageofmagdalena.com

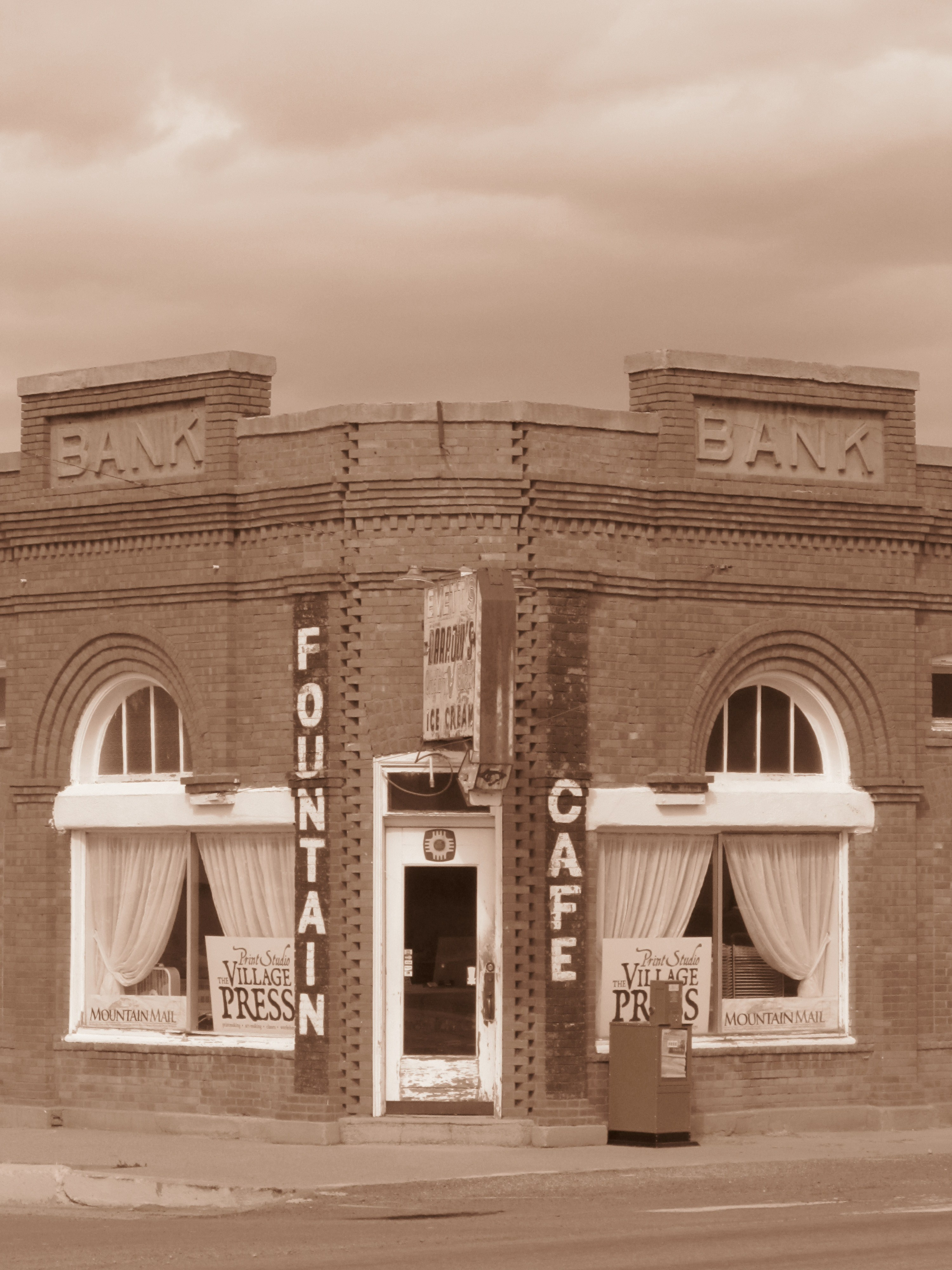
Bank of Magdelena building

Magdalena is a village in Socorro County, New Mexico, United States. As of the 2020 census, Magdalena had a population of 806.

"The Lady on the Mountain" is a rock formation on Magdalena Peak overlooking Magdalena. Spanish soldiers saw the profile of a woman on the west face of the peak. A priest with them was reminded of a similar peak in Spain called "La Sierra de Maria Magdalena", so he called the New Mexico one "La Sierra de Magdalena". The pass to the south of the peak became known as Magdalena Gap, and when a town grew up it received the same name.

Magdalena continues to be a ranching community while strengthening its art, astronomy and geology venues. The reopening of the Magdalena Hall Hotel (circa 1917) and the renovation of other historical buildings allow visitors to connect to the past. The Magdalena Public Library and Boxcar Museum are housed in the old railroad depot. Several rock and mineral shops have been around since the mining boom days. The ghost town of Kelly and two festivals, the "Open Studio and Gallery Tour" and the "Old Timers Reunion and Rodeo", bring tourists to the area. The "Enchanted Skies Star Party" in early fall brings astronomers and astro-photographers together under its very dark skies.

The Very Large Array lies 24 miles (39 km) due west of the community. The Magdalena Ridge Observatory lies 25 miles (40 km) southeast at an elevation of 10,600 feet (3,200 m). Magdalena is located 26 miles (42 km) west of Socorro.

== History ==
In 1884, the village of Magdalena was named after Magdalena Peak when its post office opened. Magdalena was incorporated as a town in 1913, during a mining boom.

Magdalena is known as the "Trails End" for the railroad spur line that was built in 1884 by the New Mexico Railroad company (A local subsidiary of the Atchison, Topeka and Santa Fe) from Socorro to Magdalena to transport the cattle, sheep wool, timber and ore. Thousands of cattle and sheep were driven into town (cowboy style) from the west, using the historic "Magdalena Trail". This stockyard driveway was used annually, from 1885 through 1916, when the driveway was officially designated by law through the signing of the "Grazing Homestead Act". It remained continually in use through 1971. The original stockyards are still intact. AT&SF closed the railroad branch on November 20, 1970, and it was removed shortly thereafter.

== Geography ==
According to the United States Census Bureau, the village has a total area of 6.2 square miles (16 km^{2}), all land.

=== Climate ===
Climate data for Magdalena, New Mexico (Elevation 6,664 ft (2,031 m))
Month	Jan	Feb	Mar	Apr	May	Jun	Jul	Aug	Sep	Oct	Nov	Dec	Year
Record high °F (°C)	78 (26)	75 (24)	84 (29)	90 (32)	94 (34)	102 (39)	102 (39)	99 (37)	97 (36)	89 (32)	78 (26)	75 (24)	102 (39)
Mean daily maximum °F (°C)	47.8 (8.8)	52.3 (11.3)	58.3 (14.6)	66.9 (19.4)	76.3 (24.6)	85.9 (29.9)	86.3 (30.2)	83.8 (28.8)	78.4 (25.8)	69.4 (20.8)	58.2 (14.6)	49.4 (9.7)	67.7 (19.8)
Mean daily minimum °F (°C)	19.8 (−6.8)	23.0 (−5.0)	28.0 (−2.2)	35.0 (1.7)	43.4 (6.3)	52.3 (11.3)	56.7 (13.7)	54.8 (12.7)	48.7 (9.3)	37.7 (3.2)	27.0 (−2.8)	20.7 (−6.3)	37.3 (2.9)
Record low °F (°C)	−24 (−31)	−6 (−21)	0 (−18)	10 (−12)	20 (−7)	34 (1)	35 (2)	36 (2)	20 (−7)	10 (−12)	−12 (−24)	−21 (−29)	−24 (−31)
Average precipitation inches (mm)	0.47 (12)	0.45 (11)	0.49 (12)	0.60 (15)	0.60 (15)	0.70 (18)	2.47 (63)	2.75 (70)	1.63 (41)	0.89 (23)	0.40 (10)	0.60 (15)	12.04 (306)
Average snowfall inches (cm)	2.0 (5.1)	2.7 (6.9)	0.8 (2.0)	0.4 (1.0)	0 (0)	0 (0)	0 (0)	0 (0)	0 (0)	0.3 (0.76)	0.6 (1.5)	1.7 (4.3)	8.4 (21)
Source: The Western Regional Climate Center

== Demographics ==
Historical population
Census	Pop.	Note	%±
1920	1,867		—
1930	1,371		−26.6%
1940	1,323		−3.5%
1950	1,297		−2.0%
1960	1,211		−6.6%
1970	652		−46.2%
1980	1,022		56.7%
1990	861		−15.8%
2000	913		6.0%
2010	938		2.7%
2020	806		−14.1%
U.S. Decennial Census

As of the census of 2000, there were 913 people, 372 households, and 244 families residing in the village. The population density was 146.8 inhabitants per square mile (56.7/km^{2}). There were 470 housing units at an average density of 75.6 per square mile (29.2/km^{2}). The racial makeup of the village was 63.05% White, 0.55% African American, 10.54% Native American, 21.80% from other races, and 5.04% from two or more races. Hispanic or Latino of any race were 51.64% of the population.

There were 372 households, of which 30.1% had children under the age of 18 living with them, 46.2% were married couples living together, 13.4% had a female householder with no husband present, and 34.4% were non-families. 30.9% of all households were made up of individuals, and 12.6% had someone living alone who was 65 years of age or older. The average household size was 2.45 and the average family size was 3.06.

In the village, the population was spread out, with 27.2% under the age of 18, 5.4% from 18 to 24, 23.7% from 25 to 44, 27.8% from 45 to 64, and 16.0% who were 65 years of age or older. The median age was 41 years. For every 100 females, there were 90.6 males. For every 100 females age 18 and over, there were 86.3 males.

The median income for a household in the village was $22,917, and the median income for a family was $30,625. Males had a median income of $26,000 versus $21,875 for females. The per capita income for the village was $13,064. About 20.8% of families and 25.1% of the population were below the poverty line, including 30.0% of those under age 18 and 23.0% of those age 65 or over.

== Media ==
In the late 19th century there was a newspaper briefly published in Magdalena known as the Magdalena Mountain Mail. Shortly after being founded in 1888, it merged with the Socorro Times, and the combined paper failed in the following year. It was followed in the early 20th century by Prospectus Printing Company's short lived Magdalena World, published only in 1918, and the Magdalena News published from 1909 to 1940. In the second half of the 20th century, the name Mountain Mail was revived in 1979 as a monthly, and starting in 1992 it had a weekly edition called the High Country Round-Up. The 21st century saw the end of newspaper publishing in Magdalena when the Mountain Mail published its last issue on June 27, 2013. It was also the last remaining locally owned newspaper in Socorro Country.

== Education ==
Magdalena Municipal Schools is the school district.

== Kelly ghost town ==
In 1883, about 2.5 miles (4.0 km) south of Magdalena, the Kelly Mine opened in the community of Kelly. The Kelly Mine produced lead, silver, zinc and smithsonite until the markets collapsed. Kelly's population reached nearly 3,000 during the mining boom. The last residents of Kelly departed in 1947 and it is now a ghost town. The Kelly Church still stands and is the site of periodic festivities.

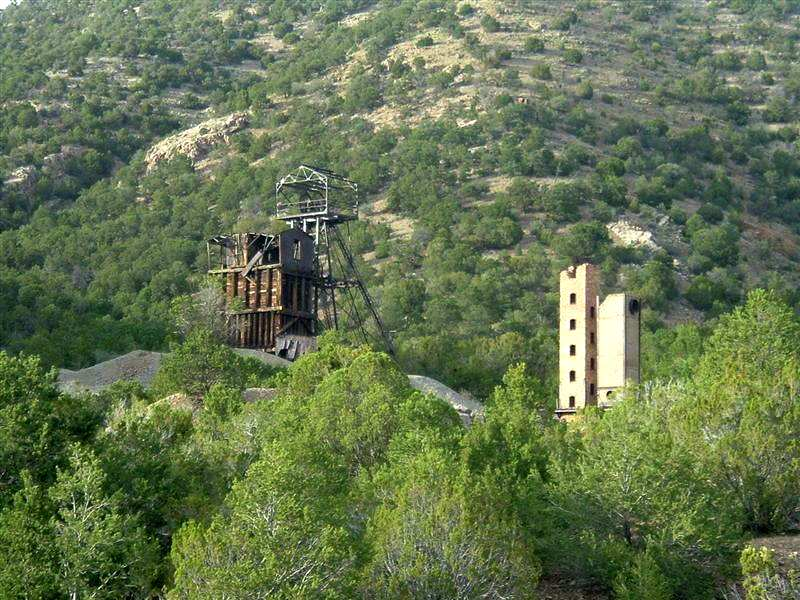
Old Kelly Mine headframe south of Magdalena (2005)

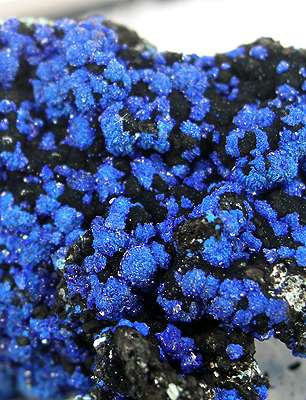
Azurite from the Kelly Mine (2010)

== See also ==
- Magdalena Mountains, the namesake of the town.
