= List of Ancestral Puebloan dwellings in New Mexico =

This is a list of Ancestral Puebloan dwellings in New Mexico, United States.

== Locations ==
Site name	Pueblo people	Nearest town (modern name)	Location	Type	Description	Photo
Abó	Tiwa/Tompiro	Mountainair			Ruins located in the Salinas Pueblo Missions National Monument.	
Acacagua					Ruins. Sometimes called Acacagui or Accafui	
Acoma	Keres			Village	Also called "Sky City", Acoma is an active pueblo. A National Historic Landmark and a National Trust Historic Site. Home of one of the 21 federally recognized Pueblos.	
Acoti		Taos			Ruins. The "birth place of Montezuma".	
Alameda	Tiwa	Bernalillo		Great House	Ruins. Located on the present-day site of Alameda Elementary School. One of the 12 pueblos of Tiwa Indians along both sides of the Rio Grande, north and south of present-day Bernalillo	
Apache Creek	Mogollon	Apache Creek			Ruins with as many as 25 rooms.	
Arroyo Hondo	Tano	Galisteo		Great House	Ruins located on the Galisteo Basin also known as Kua-Kay. 24 great houses with about 1200 rooms total, each about three stories high, surrounded eight plazas, and had at least eight kivas. The inhabitants also constructed an acequia system (irrigation ditch) from a permanent spring below the pueblo to their fields.	
Atica					Ruins. Juan de Oñate identified this pueblo in 1598. Its location is lost.	
Aychini					Ruins. Juan de Oñate identified this pueblo in 1598. Its location is lost.	
Aztec Ruins	Ancestral Puebloan	Aztec		Great House	Ruins. A National Monument, an historical property of the National Park Service, listed on the National Register of Historic Places, added to the UNESCO list of World Heritage Sites, and part of the Chaco Culture National Historical Park.	
Baguacat					Ruins. Juan de Oñate identified this pueblo in 1598. Its location is lost.	
Bandelier		Los Alamos				
Burnt Corn	Tano	Galisteo		Great House	Ruins located on the Galisteo Basin also known as Burned Corn Pueblo, or Burnt Corn Ruin. As many as 20 great houses surrounded a central plaza with an unknown number of kivas.	
Casa Blanca					Ruins. Juan de Oñate identified this pueblo in 1598. Its location is lost.	
Casa del Eco				Great House	Ruins. Juan de Oñate identified this pueblo in 1598. Its location is lost.	
Casa Montezuma					Ruins	
Castildavid					Ruins	
Caceres	Tiwa	Bernalillo		Great House	Ruins. One of the 12 pueblos of Tiwa Indians along both sides of the Rio Grande, north and south of present-day Bernalillo	
Campos	Tiwa	Bernalillo		Great House	Ruins. One of the 12 pueblos of Tiwa Indians along both sides of the Rio Grande, north and south of present-day Bernalillo	
Casa Chiquita	Ancestral Puebloan	Crownpoint		Great House	"The Little Girl's House". Ruins located in the Chaco Culture National Historical Park.	
Casamero Pueblo	Ancestral Puebloan	Prewitt		Great House	Ruins located just north of the power plant along County Road 19 approximately three miles north of Interstate 40. Very informative plaques and signs. This may be the Casa Moreno reported by Stephen Holsinger in 1901. Andrews Outlier is supposedly 4.5 km southeast.	
Casa Rinconada	Ancestral Puebloan	Crownpoint		Great Kiva	Ruins located in Chaco Culture National Historical Park.	
Cempoala	Tiwa			Great House	Ruins. One of the 12 pueblos of Tiwa Indians along both sides of the Rio Grande, north and south of present-day Bernalillo, New Mexico	
Chamisa Locita	Tano	Galisteo		Great House	Ruins located on the Galisteo Basin featuring a 300-room great house.	
Chamisal	Tiwa	Bernalillo		Great House	Ruins. One of the 12 pueblos of Tiwa Indians along both sides of the Rio Grande, north and south of present-day Bernalillo	
Chetro Ketl	Ancestral Puebloan	Crownpoint		Great House	The meaning of, "Chetro Ketl" has been lost. Ruins located in the Chaco Culture National Historical Park.	
Chipiinuinge	Tewa	Canones			Ruins. Name means "house at the pointed peak".	
Cochiti	Keres	Cochiti		Great house; cliff dwellings	Active with ruins on-site. Home of one of the 21 federally recognized Pueblos.	
Canador Peak	Hohokam			Trincheras	Ruins	
Cox Ranch		Quemado		Great house	Ruins	
Cristone		Abiquiu			Ruins	
Crumbled House	Ancestral Puebloan	Newcomb		Great house	Ruins. Great house with over 100 rooms, plus a compound with about 150 rooms. Occupied 1100 to 1250 AD	
East Community	Ancestral Puebloan	Chaco Canyon				
Embree	Mogollon	Las Cruces			Ruins	
Gallo Cliff Dwelling	Ancestral Puebloan	Gallo Canyon, New Mexico			Ruins	
Gila	Mogollon	Silver City		Cliff Dwellings, Pit Houses	Ruins	
Goesling Ranch		Quemado		Great house	Ruins	
Gran Quivira	Tiwa	Mountainair			Ruins located in the Salinas Pueblo Missions National Monument.	
Great Kivas	Zuni	Zuni			Ruins located on the Zuni Indian Reservation in the Zuni-Cibola Complex and that is listed as a National Historic Landmark.	
Guadalupe Outlier	Ancestral Puebloan	San Ysidro, Sandoval County, New Mexico			Ruins. Chaco Canyon outlier sitting atop a mesa overlooking the Rio Puerco.	
Halfway House Outlier	Ancestral Puebloan	New Mexico			Ruins	Site map of Halfway House Outlier, with Great North Road
Hawikuh	Zuni	Zuni			Ruins located on the Zuni Indian Reservation in the Zuni-Cibola Complex and that is listed as a National Historic Landmark.	
Hogback Outlier		Mountainair	50 miles northwest of Chaco Culture National Historical Park	Great house, great kiva, 35 small house sites.	Outlier community	
Houiri		Homayo		Great house	Ruins	
Hungo Pavi	Ancestral Puebloan	Crownpoint		Great house	The meaning of, "Hungo Pavi" has been lost. It may be a mispronunciation of the Hopi, "Shungopovi", meaning a Hopi village. Ruins located in Chaco Culture National Historical Park. An unexcavated Chacoan great house (monumental public building) containing over 150 rooms, a great kiva, and an enclosed plaza.	
Isleta	Tiwa	South Valley		Great house	Active pueblo with ruins on-site. Home of one of the 21 federally recognized Pueblos.	
Jemez	Towa	Jemez Springs		Great house	An active pueblo that is home of one of the 21 federally recognized Pueblos, known as the Walatowa.	
Kechipbowa	Zuni	Zuni			Ruins located on the Zuni Indian Reservation in the Zuni-Cibola Complex and that is listed as a National Historic Landmark.	
Kewa	Keres				An active pueblo that is home of one of the 21 federally recognized Pueblos. Called the "Santo Domingo Pueblo" by the Spanish, reacknowledged as Kewa in 2010.	
Kin Cheops		Quemado		Great house	Ruins	
Kin Kletso	Ancestral Puebloan	Crownpoint		Great House	"Yellow House". Ruins located in the Chaco Culture National Historical Park.	
Kin Klizhin	Ancestral Puebloan	Crownpoint		Great House	"Black House". Ruins located on the far western edge of the Chaco Culture National Historical Park.	
Kin Nahasbas	Ancestral Puebloan	Crownpoint		Great Kiva	"Round House". Ruins located in the Chaco Culture National Historical Park. Previously thought to be a great kiva, now considered a possible part of a great house.	
Kintyel	Ancestral Puebloan	Crownpoint			Ruins located in Chaco Culture National Historical Park.	
Kin Ya'a	Ancestral Puebloan			Great House	"Tall House". Ruins located immediately south of Crownpoint approximately one-half-mile east of Route 371. Entrance is unlocked gate on south side of Ikard-Newson Propane business. Fairly bad dirt road to the site, walking from the gate may be a better idea. Chacoan roads are fairly evident. Several difficult-to-spot remains of smaller buildings.	
Kuaua	Tiwa			Village	Excavated in the 1930s and now the site of the Coronado State Monument and listed on the National Register of Historic Places.	
Kyaki:ma	Zuni	Zuni			Ruins located on the Zuni Indian Reservation in the Zuni-Cibola Complex and that is listed as a National Historic Landmark.	
La Cienega	Tano	Galisteo		Great house	Ruins located on the Galisteo Basin with 140 rooms, also known as Tzi-gu-ma or Pueblo La Mesita.	
Laguna	Keres			Great house	An active pueblo that is home of one of the 21 federally recognized Pueblos.	
Leyit Kin		Mountainair	1 mile southeast of Pueblo Bonito	3 kivas, 27 rooms.	Archaeological site	
Lizard House	Ancestral Puebloan		near Pueblo Bonito	Small house		
Las Madres	Tano	Galisteo			Ruins located on the Galisteo Basin.	
Maigua	Tiwa	Bernalillo		Great house	Ruins. One of the 12 pueblos of Tiwa Indians along both sides of the Rio Grande, north and south of present-day Bernalillo	
Malpais	Tiwa	Bernalillo		Great house	Ruins. One of the 12 pueblos of Tiwa Indians along both sides of the Rio Grande, north and south of present-day Bernalillo	
Mats'a:kya	Zuni	Zuni			Ruins located on the Zuni Indian Reservation in the Zuni-Cibola Complex and that is listed as a National Historic Landmark.	
Nambe	Tewa			Great house	An active pueblo that is home of one of the 21 federally recognized Pueblos.	
Nompe	Tiwa	Bernalillo		Great house	Ruins. One of the 12 pueblos of Tiwa Indians along both sides of the Rio Grande, north and south of present-day Bernalillo	
Ohkay Owingeh	Tewa	Española		Great house	An active pueblo with ruins on-site. Once called the "San Juan Pueblo"; re-acknowledged tribal name in 2005. Home of one of the 21 federally recognized Pueblos.	
Paa-ko	Tano	Galisteo		Great house	Ruins located on the Galisteo Basin.	
Pecos	Towa	Pecos			Ruins. Now a National Historic Landmark	
Peñasco Blanco	Ancestral Puebloan	Crownpoint			"White Rock Point". Ruins located in Chaco Culture National Historical Park. Unusual in at least three ways; oval in shape, one of only two great houses on the south edge of Chaco Canyon, and it has at least four great kiva.	
Picuris	Tiwa	Peñasco		Great house	An active pueblo that is home of one of the 21 federally recognized Pueblos.	
Pilabó	Tiwa	Socorro		Great house	Ruins. Once the home of the Piro Pueblo, located at the site of the present town of the city of Socorro.	
Poblazon		Bernalillo			Ruins.	
Pojoaque	Tewa			Great house	An active pueblo that is home of one of the 21 federally recognized Pueblos.	
Posege		Taos			Ruins	
Poshuouinge	Tewa	Abiquiu		Ruins of 700-room pueblo	Two large courtyards and a kiva can still be seen.	
Pot Creek Pueblo	Tiwa	Talpa		Ruins of 400 ground floor room pueblo	Pueblo room and kiva can be seen	
Puaray	Tiwa	Bernalillo		Great house	Redeveloped into modern homes. The Chamuscado and Rodriguez Expedition left people here in 1582. One of the 12 pueblos of Tiwa Indians along both sides of the Rio Grande, north and south of present-day Bernalillo	
Pueblo Alto	Ancestral Puebloan	Crownpoint		Great House	"High Town". Ruins located in the Chaco Culture National Historical Park. Sits adjacent to New Alto and Rabbit Ruins.	
Pueblo Bonito	Ancestral Puebloan	Crownpoint		Great House	"Beautiful Town". Ruins located in the Chaco Culture National Historical Park. Standing within 70 ft of the north wall of the canyon, the building was five stories high. There are at least 27 circular kivas, and in some cases the interior of the kivas is of fine tablet masonry.	
Pueblo del Alto	Piros	Belen			Ruins lie on the east side of the Rio Grande.	
Pueblo Blanco	Piros	34° 30'			Ruins on the west rim of the Médano, east of the Rio Grande.	
Pueblo Caja del Rio		Cochiti			Ruins	
Pueblo de la Parida	Piro				Ruins located on the west run of the Médano east of the Rio Grande.	
Pueblo del Arroyo	Ancestral Puebloan	Crownpoint		Great House	"Town by the Arroyo". Ruins located in the Chaco Culture National Historical Park. Located near Pueblo Bonito, it is on the north side of the arroyo. The original height was probably 4 stories, with two kivas in the court, three built within the pueblo walls, and four outside the main building.	
Pueblo del Encierro	Keresan	Cochiti			Ruins located near the Cochiti Pueblo.	
Pueblo de los Jumanos	Jumano			Great house	The definite location of the pueblo is not known, although it is supposed to have been situated near the base of the elevation called Mesa de los Jumanes. According to Escalante the pueblo was destroyed by the Apache.	
Pueblo de los Silos	Tewa	Pecos			Ruins that are situated in the Galisteo Basin between the Keresan pueblos of the Rio Grande.	
Pueblo Galisteo	Tano	Galisteo		Great house	Ruins located on the Galisteo Basin with 47 rooms that were inhabited up into the 1700s. The inhabitants of both sites moved to Santa Domingo Pueblo.	
Pueblo de los Muertos	Hohokam	Cibola County			Ruins	
Pueblo Largo	Tano	Galisteo		Great house	Ruins located on the Galisteo Basin. There were eight rectangular great houses of stone and adobe with four regular kivas, five plazas, and a shrine. The pueblo was estimated to have contained more than 480 rooms, and although erosion has affected some of the rooms, many walls are still intact.	
Pueblo Pardo	Tiwa	Mountainair			Ruins	
Pintado	Ancestral Puebloan	McKinley County		Great House	"Painted Town". Ruins that are part of the Chaco Culture National Historical Park. The most easterly of the Chaco Canyon group, the building is L-shaped, the two wings measuring 238 feet and 174 feet, exterior measure. The inclosed court was occupied by two kivas and other semi-subterranean structures, while just outside the court is another large kiva. There are at least ten minor pueblos surrounding it.	
Pueblo Viejo		Socorro			Ruins	
Puye		Española		Cliff dwelling	Ruins located in the Santa Clara Pueblo, it is a National Historic Landmark.	
Quarai	Tiwa	Manzano			Ruins located in the Salinas Pueblo Missions National Monument.	
Robledo Mountain	Mogollon	Las Cruces			Ruins	
Salmon Ruins	Ancestral Puebloan	Bloomfield		Great House	Ruins. Listed on the New Mexico State Register of Cultural Properties and the National Register of Historic Places.	
San Cristobal	Tano	Galisteo		Great house	Ruins located on the Galisteo Basin, this pueblo is also known as Yam-p-ham-ba. Stone and adobe were used to build rectangular roomblocks and kivas. At one time, San Cristobal was one of the largest pueblos in the Southwest, four or five stories high and containing as many as 600 ground-floor rooms.	
Sandia	Tiwa	Bernalillo		Great house	Ruins but now occupied with 1742 Sandia Pueblo. One of the 12 pueblos of Tiwa Indians along both sides of the Rio Grande, north and south of present-day Bernalillo	
San Lazaro	Tano	Santa Fe		Village	Ruins located on the Galisteo Basin, this pueblo is listed on the National Register of Historic Places as a National Historic Landmark. A 450-room pueblo that included a kiva, a plaza, an irrigation reservoir, two roomblocks, and a sweat lodge.	
San Marcos	Tano	Galisteo		Great house	Ruins located on the Galisteo Basin. A major trade center for the region, there were great houses with more than a hundred rooms are located around a central plaza with numerous kivas. San Marcos became an important paraje, or campsite, on one of the main routes of El Camino Real de Tierra Adentro. After the Pueblo Revolt in 1680 the people of San Marcos joined the Navajo and Apache in refugee communities in Potrero Viejo. The Keresan inhabitants fled to Acoma pueblo, and others to Hopi.	
Sandia	Tiwa	Albuquerque			An active pueblo that is home of one of the 21 federally recognized Pueblos.	
Santa Ana	Keres				An active pueblo that is home of one of the 21 federally recognized Pueblos.	
Santa Clara	Tewa	Española			An active pueblo that is home of one of the 21 federally recognized Pueblos.	
San Pascual	Piro	Socorro			Ruins located east of the Rio Grande, on a butte, on the western slope of the Little San Pascual Mountain, near the eastern boundary of the Bosque del Apache National Wildlife Refuge.	
San Felipe	Keres			Great house	An active pueblo that is home of one of the 21 federally recognized Pueblos.	
San Ildefonso	Tewa			Great house	An active pueblo that is home of one of the 21 federally recognized Pueblos.	
San Rafael de los Gentiles					Ruins	
Santiago	Tiwa	Bernalillo		Village	Excavated in the 1930s and now the site of modern homes. One of the 12 pueblos of Tiwa Indians along both sides of the Rio Grande, north and south of present-day Bernalillo; see Tiguex War.	
Senecú	Tiwa	San Pasqual			Ruins. Once the home of the Piro Pueblo, the exact location of this pueblo has been lost.	
Starkweather	Mogollon	Reserve		Great house	Ruins	
Taos	Tiwa	Taos		Great house	An active pueblo that is home of one of the 21 federally recognized Pueblos.	
Tarque Pueblo	Tiwa	Mountainair			Ruins	
Tesuque	Tewa	Santa Fe		Great house	An active pueblo that is home of one of the 21 federally recognized Pueblos.	
Teypana	Tiwa	Socorro		Great house	Ruins. Once the home of the Piro Pueblo.	
Tijeras		Tijeras		Great house	Ruins	
Tom's Rock		Pie Town		Great house	Ruins	
Tonque		San Felipe		Great house	Ruins on north side of Tonque Arroyo, about 7 miles southeast of San Felipe	
Tsankawi		White Rock			Ruins located in the Bandelier National Monument.	
Tsin Kletzin	Ancestral Puebloan	Crownpoint		Great house	"Black Wood Place" or "Charcoal Place". Ruins located in Chaco Culture National Historical Park. One of only two great houses on the southern side of Chaco Canyon. Believed to be situated in order to provide a line-of-sight of at least six other great houses (Pueblo Alto, Penasco Blanco, Kin Kletso, Bis sa'ani, Kin Klizhin, and Kin Ya'a). Built on a north-south line with Casa Rinconada and Pueblo Alto.	
Tsirege		White Rock		Great house	Ruins. Located on property owned by the Los Alamos National Laboratory, it is regarded as ancestral by the San Ildefonso Pueblo.	
Tyuonyi					Ruins located in the Bandelier National Monument.	
Una Vida	Ancestral Puebloan	Crownpoint		Great house	"One Life". Unexcavated ruins located in the Chaco Culture National Historical Park within 100 metres of the visitor center.	
Upper Arroyo Hondo	Tano	Galisteo		Great house	Ruins. This neighbor to larger Arroyo Hondo pueblo contained about 50 rooms and one kiva on the Galisteo Basin.	
Wachte	Tiwa	Bernalillo		Great house	Ruins. One of the 12 pueblos of Tiwa Indians along both sides of the Rio Grande, north and south of present-day Bernalillo	
Wijiji	Ancestral Puebloan	Crownpoint		Great House	"Black Greasewood". Ruins located in the Chaco Culture National Historical Park.	
Heshotathluptsina (Yellow House)	Zuni	Zuni			Ruins located on the Zuni Indian Reservation in the Zuni-Cibola Complex and that is listed as a National Historic Landmark.	
Zia	Keres			Great house	An active pueblo that is home of one of the 21 federally recognized Pueblos.	

== See also ==
- History of New Mexico
