= San Antonito, New Mexico =

San Antonito, New Mexico may refer to the following places in New Mexico, United States:

- San Antonito, Bernalillo County, New Mexico, a census-designated place
- San Antonito, Socorro County, New Mexico, a census-designated place

== See also ==
- San Antonio, New Mexico, a census-designated place
