= Chaco Culture =

UNESCO World Heritage Site
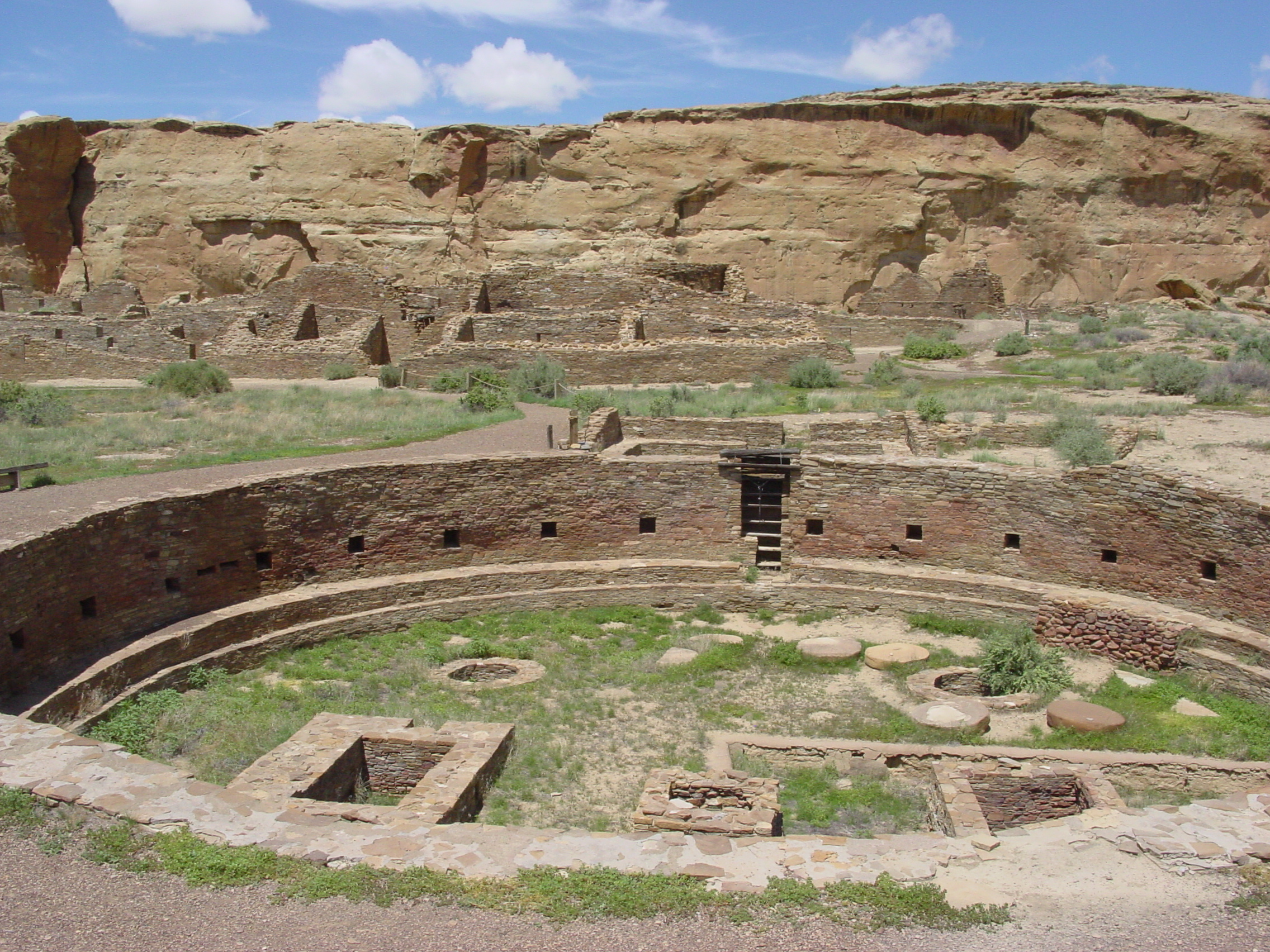
- Great kiva of Chetro Ketl
- Location: United States
- Includes: Chaco Culture National Historical Park; Aztec Ruins National Monument
- Criteria: (iii)
- Reference: 353
- Inscription: 1987 (11th Session)
- Area: 14,261 ha (35,240 acres)

Chaco Culture is a UNESCO World Heritage Site in the southwestern U.S. state of New Mexico.

For over 2,000 years, Pueblo peoples occupied a vast region of the south-western United States. Chaco Canyon, a major centre of ancestral Pueblo culture between 850 and 1250, was a focus for ceremonials, trade and political activity for the prehistoric Four Corners area. Chaco is remarkable for its monumental public and ceremonial buildings and its distinctive architecture – it has an ancient urban ceremonial centre that is unlike anything constructed before or since. In addition to the Chaco Culture National Historical Park, the World Heritage property includes the Aztec Ruins National Monument and several smaller Chaco sites managed by the Bureau of Land Management.

In 1987 Chaco Culture was inscribed on the UNESCO World Heritage List as an outstanding example of world cultural patrimony. In 2006, the official name of this World Heritage Site changed from Chaco Culture National Historical Park to Chaco Culture. In 2026, the National Trust for Historic Preservation listed the Greater Chaco Cultural Landscape on their annual "America’s 11 Most Endangered Historic Places" due to plans to lift federal protections and initiate oil and gas development.

== Application ==
The 1972 World Heritage Convention identifies ten criteria for assessing “outstanding universal value.” The United States Department of the Interior nominated Chaco Culture under the third criterion: “to bear a unique or at least exceptional testimony to a cultural tradition or to a civilization which is living or which has disappeared.” The park’s statement of significance points to the monumental and distinctive architecture, the sophisticated astronomical understanding, and the complex road system as defining elements of this ceremonial, trade, and political center. Of course the civilization that flourished at Chaco 1,000 years ago was exceptional, but the park’s modern-day UNESCO inscription is unique as well because it includes sites outside the park, some owned by the Bureau of Land Management, the State of New Mexico, and the Navajo Nation. When the World Heritage Committee reviewed Chaco’s application in 1987, it enthusiastically recommended the park for inclusion but also suggested that the United States government consider including other impressive examples of Puebloan culture. As a result, Aztec Ruins and several other sites are all part of the World Heritage designation.

== Outstanding Universal Value ==
Chaco Culture is a network of archaeological sites in northwestern New Mexico which preserves outstanding elements of a vast pre-Columbian cultural complex that dominated much of what is now the southwestern United States from the mid-9th to early 13th centuries. It includes Chaco Culture National Historical Park, the associated sites at Aztec Ruins National Monument, and five additional protected archaeological areas. The Chacoan society reached its height between about 1020 and 1110.These sites were a focus for ceremonies, trade, and political activity and they are remarkable for their monumental public and ceremonial buildings and distinctive multi-storey “great houses.” The sites were linked by an elaborate system of carefully engineered and constructed roads, many of which can still be traced. These achievements are particularly remarkable given the harsh environment of the region.

The highly organized large-scale structures, featuring multi-storey construction and sophisticated coursed masonry, illustrate the increasing complexity of Chaco social structure, which distinguished itself within the regional culture of the ancestral Pueblo and dominated the area for more than four centuries. The high incidence of storage areas indicate the probability that the Chacoans played a central economic role, and the great size and unusual features of the ceremonial kivas suggest that complex religious ceremony may have been significant in their lives.

Chaco Culture satisfies the Criterion (iii) of the World Heritage Convention. The Chaco Canyon sites graphically illustrate the architectural and engineering achievements of the Chacoan people, who overcame the harshness of the environment of the southwestern United States to found a culture that dominated the area for more than four centuries.

== List of sites ==
The following list shows all 10 sites protected by the Chaco Culture World Heritage Site.

- Chaco Culture National Historical Park
- Kin Bineola
- Kin Ya'a
- Aztec Ruins National Monument
- Pierre’s site
- Halfway House
- Twin Angels
- Salmon Ruins
- Kin Nizhoni
- Casamero

== See also ==
- Mesa Verde National Park
