= Socorro School District =

Socorro School District may refer to:

- Socorro Consolidated Schools (New Mexico)
- Socorro Independent School District (Texas)
