= Luis Lopez, New Mexico =

Unincorporated community in New Mexico, US

- Unincorporated community
- Location within the state of New Mexico Luis Lopez (the United States)
- Coordinates: 33°59′20″N 106°53′07″W
- Country: United States
- State: New Mexico
- County: Socorro
- Elevation: 4,610 ft (1,410 m)
- Time zone: UTC-7 (Mountain (MST))
  - Summer (DST): UTC-6 (MDT)
- ZIP codes: 87801
- Area code: 575
- GNIS feature ID: 2584147

Luis Lopez is an unincorporated community and census-designated place in Socorro County, New Mexico, United States. As of the 2020 census, Luis Lopez had a population of 66. It lies between Socorro and San Antonio along the Rio Grande.

== History ==
In 1667, Captain Luis López was alcalde mayor (mayor) of the Piro Pueblo of Senecú. It appears that he had a hacienda on the east bank of the Rio Grande. During the 18th century, the estancia was mentioned in the journals of a few travellers, though it had been abandoned after the Pueblo Revolt of 1680. The village of Luis Lopez appears to have been founded by the early to mid 1830s. At that time, it was located on the west bank of the Rio Grande, just east of its present-day site.

Luis Lopez has been listed in censuses every decade at least as recently as 1980 since 1850, except for 1870. Since the village was not counted in that year, it is thought that it may have been abandoned for a short time and then relocated to its present position above the flood plain. However, most of Luis Lopez remains in the flood plain, protected from the Rio Grande by levees. In May 1941, severe flooding required the evacuation of families in the floodplain.

Luis Lopez was also listed in both the 1833 and 1845 New Mexico censuses, details of which can be found at Albuquerque Public Library, Main Library, second floor Genealogy Center.

In 1952, the Luis Lopez School District was consolidated with the Socorro School District and the school was closed. However, the building continued to be used as a community center for some years.

Today, the community of Luis Lopez consists of farms and a small suburb. New wells have brought growth to the community. The community is a suburb of Socorro.

== Education ==
It is within Socorro Consolidated Schools. Socorro High School is the comprehensive high school of the district.
