= San Pascual Pueblo =

San Pascual Pueblo was a Piro pueblo south and east of Socorro, in Socorro County, New Mexico, United States. Its ruins lie on the east bank of the Rio Grande, on a butte, on the western slope of the Little San Pascual Mountain, overlooking the river, near the eastern boundary of the Bosque del Apache National Wildlife Refuge.

== History ==
The San Pascual pueblo was the largest Piro pueblo in the sixteenth century, with a population estimated to be over 2,000. San Pascual was reported to have been in sight of Senecú another Piro pueblo on the west bank of the Rio Grande to the south near Mesa del Contadero.

An earlier, smaller, more compact, but well fortified Piro pueblo, known as San Pascualito, dating from the fourteenth century lies nearby north of San Pascual on a small summit at an elevation about 100 feet above the river valley.
