= Polvadera, New Mexico =

Unincorporated community in New Mexico, United States

- Unincorporated community & census-designated place
- Location in the United States
- Coordinates: 34°12′07″N 106°55′02″W
- Country: United States
- State: New Mexico
- County: Socorro

Area
  - Total: 0.97 sq mi (2.51 km^{2})
  - Land: 0.97 sq mi (2.51 km^{2})
  - Water: 0 sq mi (0.00 km^{2})
- Elevation: 4,649 ft (1,417 m)

Population (2020)
  - Total: 178
  - Density: 184/sq mi (70.9/km^{2})
- Time zone: UTC-7 (Mountain (MST))
  - Summer (DST): UTC-6 (MDT)
- ZIP code: 87828
- Area code: 575
- FIPS code: 35-58910
- GNIS feature ID: 2584183

Polvadera (La Polvadera de San Lorenzo) is an unincorporated community and census-designated place in Socorro County in central New Mexico, United States. It is located on the west bank of the Rio Grande, near the mouth of the Rio Salado, and on the western spur of El Camino Real de Tierra Adentro. As of the 2020 census, Polvadera had a population of 178.

== Name ==
The name may be based upon a Piro name for the place, but altered in form because polvareda means dusty in Spanish, which, as US Army Lt. Emory noted in 1846, it certainly is. Other spellings of the name include Pulvidera and Pulvedera. The church in Polvadera was dedicated to San Lorenzo and his feast day, August 10, is the local fiesta.

== History ==
Polvadera was founded as a farming community in the 1620s after Juan de Oñate had established the province of Santa Fe de Nuevo México, when Spanish settlers came north and settled among the Piro Pueblo Indians. The name of the original Piro pueblo there is unknown and its ruins, which may have been destroyed by the meandering of the Rio Grande, have not been excavated. In 1629 Apaches destroyed the pueblo of Polvareda. It was subsequently rebuilt, but was abandoned as a result of the Pueblo Revolt of 1680, and because of further Apache raiding after the reconquest was not resettled again until the early 19th century after Governor Fernando Chacón reopened the area for settlement.

Apache and Navajo raids continued until after the American Civil War when the US Army began a strenuous interdiction policy. The town was attacked as late as 1846 by over a hundred Navajo who made away with a large number of livestock.

Camp Connelly, sometimes called Fort Connelly, was established by Colonel Canby in 1862 adjacent to Polvadera, on land leased from the then governor Henry Connelly. Lt. William Brady was sent there as a recruiting officer to process volunteers. Camp Connelly was only maintained until the end of the civil war in 1865.

The Santa Fe Railroad came through in 1882 and the Post Office in Polvadero was established in 1895. The current church of San Lorenzo was built in 1898.

Polvadera has always been subject to the flooding of the Rio Grande. Major floods occurred in 1898, which destroyed the church, in 1929, and 1937. Formerly, the major diversion of Rio Grande water for irrigation in Socorro County occurred at Polvadera; however, after the floods of 1929 a new diversion was built upstream at San Acacia.

In 1958 when Interstate 25 was being built down the Rio Grande valley, Polvadera was not given an exit, the nearest exit provided was at Lemitar a few miles to the south.

== Economy ==
Polvadera is primarily a farming community. Before Prohibition, it had large areas devoted to grapes for the production of wine. More recently chile has been the main crop.

== Demographics ==
Historical population
Census	Pop.	Note	%±
2020	178		—
U.S. Decennial Census

== Education ==
It is within Socorro Consolidated Schools. Socorro High School is the comprehensive high school of the district.

== Attractions ==
Nearby, to the west of the community, is San Lorenzo Canyon, a popular hiking and picnic spot.
