= Owl Bar and Cafe =

Cafe and bar in San Antonio, New Mexico

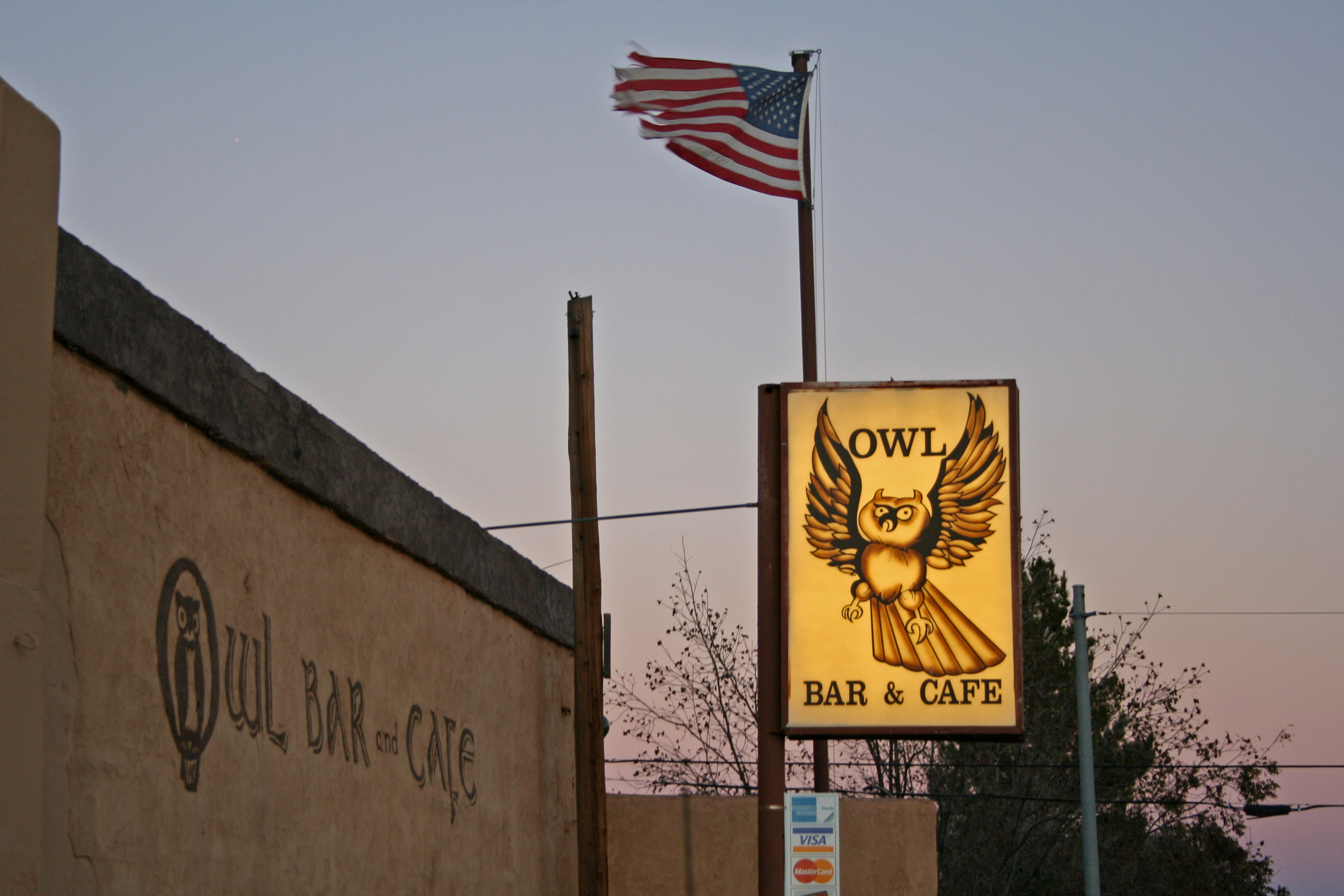
- Owl Bar and Cafe, outdoor signage
- Interactive map of Owl Bar and Cafe

Restaurant information
- Established: 1945
- Location: 77 US-380, San Antonio, Socorro County, New Mexico, USA
- Coordinates: 33.9180°N 106.8678°W
- Website: sanantonioowl.com

The Owl Bar and Cafe, in San Antonio, New Mexico, was opened in 1945 by Frank and Dee Chavez as an expansion to J.E. Miera's grocery store business. Founded to serve the Manhattan Project workers at the Trinity site, it known for its green chile cheeseburgers.

== Background ==
In 1939, through his grocery store, Miera began renting out cabins, selling gasoline, and providing telephone phone service. His only other competitor at the time was the A.H. Hilton Mercantile. In 1945, seeing an opportunity to serve the Manhattan Project workers at the Trinity site, Miera's son-in-law Chavez opened the bar and café adjacent to the store.

Inside the Owl Bar is a 25 foot (7.6 m) mahogany bar built by the Brunswick-Balke-Collender Company, now known as the Brunswick Corporation. It was originally part of the A.H. Hilton Mercantile, owned by Augustus Halvorsen Hilton, patriarch of the Hilton family. After a fire destroyed the mercantile in 1940, the Brunswick bar was salvaged from the wreckage and installed in back of the grocery store to create the first iteration of the Owl Bar and Café.

It is said that proprietors of the bar and cafe were tipped off to be outside at 5:30 am the next day but didn't tell them why. The next morning they were among the only witnesses to the first atomic blast.

It is known throughout the United States for its green chile cheeseburgers. It is also known for its wall of dollars, pinned there by customers, and donated to charity once a year.

It is said that the name of the establishment came from the "night owls" who spent their time in the back of the bar gambling.
