= Lemitar, New Mexico =

- Census-designated place
- Location within New Mexico
- Coordinates: 34°09′18″N 106°54′44″W
- Country: United States
- State: New Mexico
- County: Socorro

Area
  - Total: 1.37 sq mi (3.55 km^{2})
  - Land: 1.37 sq mi (3.55 km^{2})
  - Water: 0 sq mi (0.00 km^{2})
- Elevation: 4,675 ft (1,425 m)

Population (2020)
  - Total: 346
  - Density: 252.3/sq mi (97.41/km^{2})
- Time zone: UTC-7 (Mountain (MST))
  - Summer (DST): UTC-6 (MDT)
- ZIP code: 87823
- Area code: 575
- GNIS feature ID: 2584140

Lemitar is a census-designated place in Socorro County, New Mexico, United States. As of the 2020 census, Lemitar had a population of 346. Lemitar has a post office with ZIP code 87823. Exit 156 on Interstate 25 serves the community.

== Geography ==
According to the U.S. Census Bureau, the community has an area of 1.371 square miles (3.55 km^{2}), all land.

== Demographics ==
Historical population
Census	Pop.	Note	%±
2020	346		—
U.S. Decennial Census

== Education ==
It is within Socorro Consolidated Schools. Socorro High School is the comprehensive high school of the district.
