= Escondida, New Mexico =

- Unincorporated community
- Location within New Mexico
- Coordinates: 34°06′05″N 106°53′51″W
- Country: United States
- State: New Mexico
- County: Socorro

Area
  - Total: 0.14 sq mi (0.35 km^{2})
  - Land: 0.14 sq mi (0.35 km^{2})
  - Water: 0 sq mi (0.00 km^{2})
- Elevation: 4,626 ft (1,410 m)

Population (2020)
  - Total: 45
  - Density: 335.2/sq mi (129.43/km^{2})
- Time zone: UTC-7 (Mountain (MST))
  - Summer (DST): UTC-6 (MDT)
- Area code: 575
- GNIS feature ID: 2584096

Escondida is an unincorporated community and census-designated place in Socorro County, New Mexico, United States. As of the 2020 census, Escondida had a population of 45. Interstate 25 passes through the community.

== Geography ==
According to the U.S. Census Bureau, the community has an area of 0.135 square miles (0.35 km^{2}), all land.

== Demographics ==
Historical population
Census	Pop.	Note	%±
2020	45		—
U.S. Decennial Census

== Education ==
It is within Socorro Consolidated Schools. Socorro High School is the comprehensive high school of the district.
