= Chamizal, New Mexico =

- Unincorporated community
- Location within New Mexico
- Coordinates: 34°13′06″N 106°54′54″W
- Country: United States
- State: New Mexico
- County: Socorro

Area
  - Total: 0.44 sq mi (1.14 km^{2})
  - Land: 0.44 sq mi (1.14 km^{2})
  - Water: 0 sq mi (0.00 km^{2})
- Elevation: 4,672 ft (1,424 m)

Population (2020)
  - Total: 51
  - Density: 115.4/sq mi (44.55/km^{2})
- Time zone: UTC-7 (Mountain (MST))
  - Summer (DST): UTC-6 (MDT)
- Area code: 575
- GNIS feature ID: 2584074

Chamizal is an unincorporated community and census-designated place in Socorro County, New Mexico, United States. As of the 2020 census, Chamizal had a population of 51. New Mexico State Road 408 passes through the community.

== Geography ==
According to the U.S. Census Bureau, the community has an area of 0.442 square miles (1.14 km^{2}), all land.

== Demographics ==
Historical population
Census	Pop.	Note	%±
2020	51		—
U.S. Decennial Census

== Education ==
It is within Socorro Consolidated Schools. Socorro High School is the comprehensive high school of the district.
