= Contadero, New Mexico =

Ghost town in New Mexico, United States

Contadero is a ghost town along the east bank of the Rio Grande in Socorro County, New Mexico, United States.

== History ==
=== "El Contadero" ===
Originally the site was part of a paraje called "El Contadero" for several hundred years along the narrow trail of the Camino Real de Tierra Adentro, west and south of Mesa del Contadero between the river and the mesa.

Sheep pens from the Spanish colonial and Mexican period, have been found at an archeological site, Corrales de Contadero (LA 31735, Río Abajo Site No. 72), that may be associated with the paraje on the south side of the mesa near the river.

=== Contadero ===
In the 19th century, with Fort Craig, located across the river, providing protection from Apache attacks and providing employment, a small town named Contadero was established in the vicinity of the Corrales de Contadero in the 1860s along the river on the south side of the mesa. The towns population at its peak was 140. Its prosperity lasted until the fort was abandoned in 1884. It gradually declined, especially after 1895 when plans to develop a dam down river doomed the fields of the towns farmers along the river. By 1920 the population was 63. Within a few years the Elephant Butte Reservoir rose and covered the fields in the river valley and the town of Contadero, was abandoned. Its neighboring settlement Paraje down river, soon followed.

== The site today ==
Today there are only few remains of the settlement amongst the brush west of the railroad tracks, the ruin of the church and foundations of a house surrounded by Mexican era rock corrals.

Coordinates: 33°39′04″N 106°59′18″W
