= Teypana =

Teypana (alternate spelling “Teypama”) was the first pueblo to be called Socorro. This Piro pueblo was located close to present-day Socorro, New Mexico. A reference from 1598 suggests Teypana was on the west bank of the Rio Grande, downriver from the pueblo of Pilabó (the site of modern Socorro). Found in a partly flawed list of Piro pueblos, the reference is somewhat problematic. In 1598, Juan de Oñate and an advance party of his colonists were given food and water by the people of Teypana. In response, they named the settlement Socorro, which means “help” or “aid” in Spanish. By 1626, the name had become associated with the Piro pueblo of Pilabó, site of the first permanent mission in Piro territory, now buried under the town of Socorro, NM.

It has been claimed that Teypana means “village flower” in the Piro language. As the Piro language survives only in fragments, however, the meaning of the name Teypana, like all 17th-century Piro place names, remains unknown.

Michael Bletzer has done a lot of excavation on a site in the vicinity of Luis Lopez which he believes to be the Teypana village.
