= Navajo Springs Outlier =

Ancestral Puebloan outlier community

Navajo Springs Outlier is an Ancestral Puebloan outlier community located 120 miles (190 km) southwest of Chaco Culture National Historical Park, New Mexico. The great house is one of the more westerly Chacoan pueblos. Three small house sites are located nearby, as are several midden piles. The site also contains a great kiva and seven berms. Two ancient roads connect portions of the site, which is protected by the Navajo Nation.
