= Mesa del Contadero =

Mesa in New Mexico, United States

Coordinates: 33°40′00″N 106°59′02″W

Mesa del Contadero, sometimes called Black Mesa, also appeared on a 1773 Spanish map as Mesa de Senecú, is a basalt mesa that stands out on the east bank of the Rio Grande over three miles southwest of Val Verde in Socorro County, New Mexico. The mesa rises up dramatically from its lower surroundings in steep sides of 250 to 300 feet, particularly on the three sides where the river must pass around it to the west. It then levels off to a level area on top of an elevation of 4,810 feet (1,470 meters), with a high point summit called Mesa Peak at 4,916 feet on the northeast edge of the Mesa.

== History ==
On May 27, 1598, as the Oñate Expedition entered Piro lands from the south after crossing the Jornada del Muerto, Juan de Oñate named this mesa "Mesilla de Guinea" (little table of Guinea [Africa]) named this because the mesa was made of black rock. This name the mesa has survived as "Black Mesa". This mesa became the southern boundary marker of Santa Fe de Nuevo México.

When the Spanish returned to New Mexico after the Pueblo Revolt, the governor Antonio de Otermin called the place he camped on the trail around the mesa next to the river as "El Contadero" (The Counting Place). It gave the mesa its name, "Mesa del Contadero," meaning the "Table of the Accountant," referring to the place along the mesa and the Rio Grande where provincial border officials counted the numbers of sheep being herded out of the province, south past them with the trade caravans into Mexico. This sheep trade had been the major item of trade for the province before the Revolt, and would be again after it recovered from the effects of the Revolt. They also counted the numbers of animals being brought into the province for tax purposes. The taxes on imported animals and goods in the caravans from the south supported the government and the pathway around the mesa remained known as El Contadero (The Counting Place).

Senecú was the closest Piro pueblo they encountered, just across the river from this mesa. During the Pueblo Revolt Senecú was evacuated and never repopulated. The ruins across the river from the mesa during the 17th and 18th centuries gave the mesa another name, “Mesa de Senecú,” seen on the Spanish Map “Plano del Rio Grande, 1773 by Miera y Pacheco. Also named on that map was the site of the Paraje de Contadero on the south side of “Mesa de Senecú” close to the Rio Grande. By the 19th century the ruins of Senecú had vanished, probably washed away in one of the large Rio Grande floods, and with it the Senecú name of the mesa, as memory of it faded.
