= Socorro High School (Socorro, New Mexico) =

Location
- 1200 Michigan St; Socorro, New Mexico 87801-1367; United States
- Coordinates: 34.0426°N 106.9067°W

Information
- School type: Public
- School district: Socorro Consolidated Schools
- NCES District ID: 3502460
- CEEB code: 320660
- NCES School ID: 350246000571
- Teaching staff: 31.55 (FTE)
- Enrollment: 378 (2024-2025)
- Student to teacher ratio: 11.98
- Colors: Blue and white
- Athletics conference: NMAA 4A District 3
- Mascot: Warriors
- Website: socorro.k12.nm.us/shs/default.html

Socorro High School is the only public high school in Socorro, New Mexico, and the only high school in the Socorro Consolidated School District. As of 2021, the school reported 499 students.

The school district, which has Socorro HS as its only comprehensive high school, includes Socorro, Alamillo, Chamizal, Escondida, Lemitar, Luis Lopez, Polvadera, San Acacia, San Antonio, and San Antonito.

== Background ==
In 2014, the school was ranked below average for the state in college readiness, and near average in reading and math by U.S. News & World Report. The New Mexico Public Education Department gave the school a 'B' letter grade in 2013.

Socorro high participates in athletics as part of the New Mexico Activities Association (NMAA). The school is in district 3, and as of 2014 is in the AAAA class. The Socorro high's football team won the AAA state championship in 1977. The boys' basketball team won the state AAA championship in 1998. The girls' golf program has won the state A-AAA championship 18 times from 1973 to 2013. The boys golf program won the A-AAA championship 12 times from 1962 to 1982, and again in 2006 and 2016.

== Notable alumni ==
- Jeff Bhasker, music producer (graduated in 1993)
- Louis E. Saavedra, 25th mayor of Albuquerque, New Mexico
