= East Community =

East Community is an Ancestral Puebloan great house community and archeological site located 12 miles (19 km) east of Pueblo Bonito, at the eastern end of Chaco Culture National Historical Park, New Mexico, United States. Archeological evidence uncovered during the 1980s suggests the site was occupied by both Chacoans and Mesa Verdeans. Eighty-two structures have been identified in the area, including a great house that contains twenty-five rooms and several small house sites. At least one kiva has been uncovered there, but no great kivas. A partial road segment is visible there, but archeologists are unsure if it connects with a longer segment thought to originate near Pueblo Pintado. The great house at East Community was constructed in the 10th century, with significant additions completed during the 11th century. The associated small house sites were occupied by Chacoans from 875 to 1300, and thirty-nine of them by Mesa Verdeans, from 1175 to 1300. Archeologist Thomas Windes believes the site was linked to Chaco Canyon through a system of signaling stations atop the area's mesas.
