= Tsirege =

Archeological site in New Mexico, United States

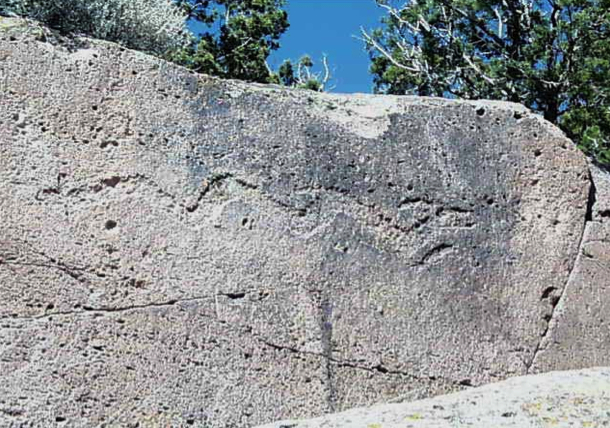
Rock art at Tsirege depicting Awanyu, a horned water serpent deity.

Tsirege (Tewa: Tsiḏege Ówîngeh Kayyee; also Tshirege) is a classic Ancestral Puebloan archaeological site located north of Pajarito Road (now closed to the public) about one mile west of White Rock, New Mexico on property owned by Los Alamos National Laboratory. Tsirege consists of approximately 800 rooms, was occupied from c. 1325 to c. 1600, and is regarded by the people of San Ildefonso Pueblo as ancestral. The name means "bird place" in the Tewa language. The site includes a long defensive wall, 10 kivas, a reservoir, and many significant petroglyph panels. Tours of the site are rarely offered (twice per decade on average).

Coordinates: 35.8267°N 106.2293°W

== See also ==
- Bandelier National Monument
- Tsankawi
- Puye Cliff Dwellings
