= Lizard House =

Lizard House is an Ancestral Puebloan small house located near Pueblo Bonito in Chaco Culture National Historical Park, New Mexico. Constructed in two phases, starting in the early 12th century, the site is an example of the changing Puebloan architecture of the 12th century.
