= San Antonito, Socorro County, New Mexico =

San Antonito, New Mexico
- Census-designated place
- Location within New Mexico
- Coordinates: 33°53′30″N 106°52′28″W
- Country: United States
- State: New Mexico
- County: Socorro

Area
  - Total: 1.730 sq mi (4.48 km^{2})
  - Land: 1.730 sq mi (4.48 km^{2})
  - Water: 0 sq mi (0 km^{2})
- Elevation: 4,626 ft (1,410 m)

Population (2010)
  - Total: 94
  - Density: 54/sq mi (21/km^{2})
- Time zone: UTC-7 (Mountain (MST))
  - Summer (DST): UTC-6 (MDT)
- Area code: 575
- GNIS feature ID: 2584201

San Antonito is a census-designated place in Socorro County, New Mexico, United States. Its population was 94 as of the 2010 census.

== Education ==
It is within Socorro Consolidated Schools. Socorro High School is the comprehensive high school of the district.

== See also ==
- List of census-designated places in New Mexico
