= San Lazaro archaeological site =

- San Lazaro
- U.S. National Register of Historic Places
- U.S. National Historic Landmark
- NM State Register of Cultural Properties
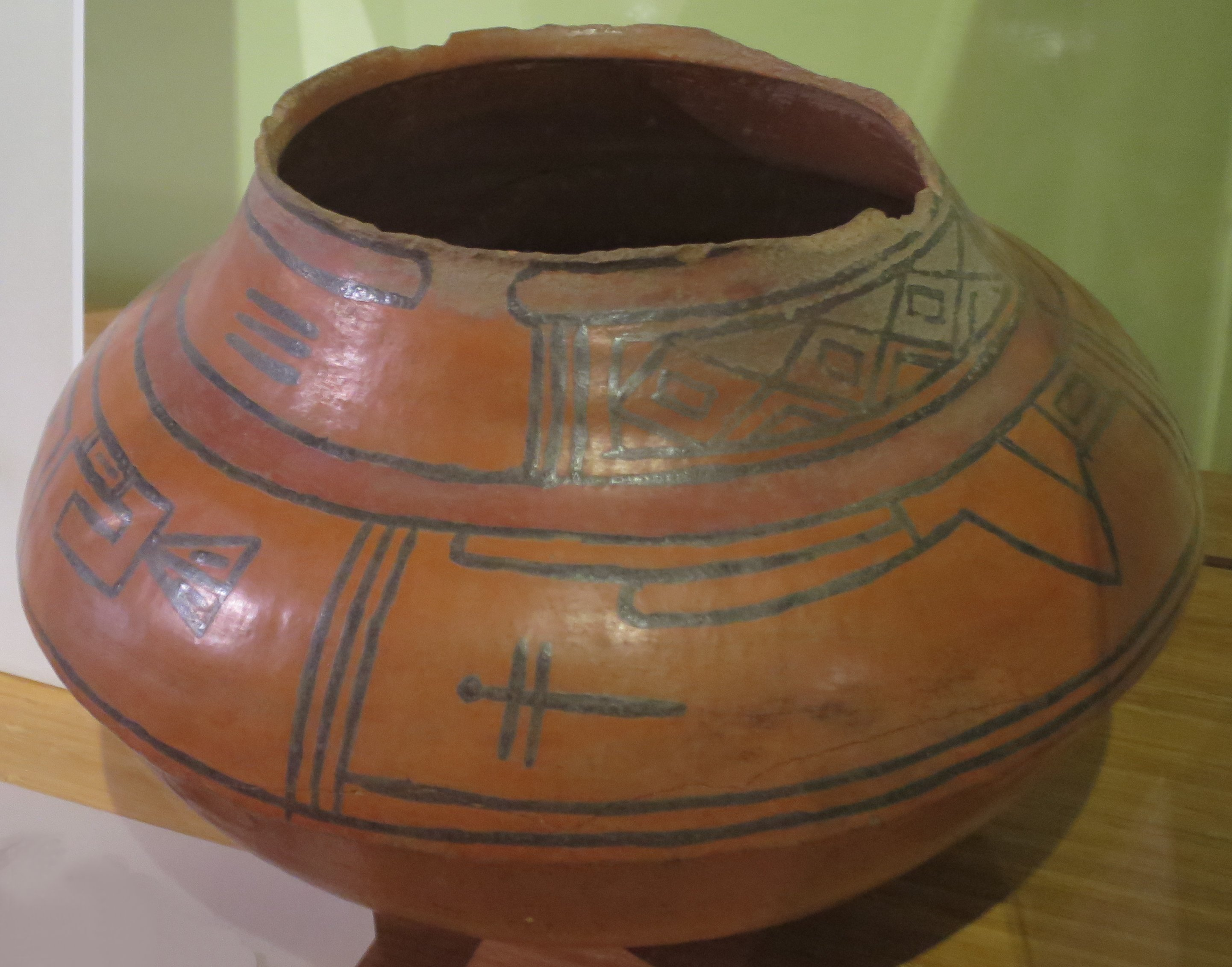
- San Lazaro Glaze polychrome jar, 1490-1550, Heard Museum
- Nearest city: Santa Fe, New Mexico
- Coordinates: 35.365°N 106.037°W
- Area: 300 acres (120 ha)
- Built: 1300
- NRHP reference No.: 66000490
- NMSRCP No.: 113

Significant dates
- Added to NRHP: October 15, 1966
- Designated NHL: July 19, 1964
- Designated NMSRCP: September 12, 1969

San Lazaro is an archaeological site of pueblos in the U.S. state of New Mexico. Located in the basin of the Galisteo River south of Santa Fe, it was home to a clan of the Tanoan peoples at the time of Spanish colonial contact in the 16th century. It was abandoned in the aftermath of the Spanish reconquest of the area after the 1680 Pueblo Revolt, its people believed to have eventually settled at First Mesa among the Hopi. The site was declared a National Historic Landmark in 1964.

== Description ==
San Lazaro is one of a large number of archaeological sites in the Galisteo Basin, a region historically occupied by the Tanoan people. The San Lazaro complex is one of the largest in the valley, with an estimated two to five thousand chambers in several room blocks on the south side of the river. Other features of the site include kilns, a water diversion canal, and a hilltop shrine. The site is more than 175 hectares (430 acres) in size. It was excavated in the 1910s by Nels Nelson.

== History ==
The Galisteo River basin was first encountered by European explorers in the 1581-82 Chamuscado and Rodríguez Expedition, in which the site now identified as San Lazaro has been associated by some researchers with the expedition's name "Malagón". It was known to be occupied when Juan de Oñate established the Spanish province of Santa Fe de Nuevo México in the late 1590s. Its people were active participants in the 1680 Pueblo Revolt, occupying Santa Fe during the interregnum and suffering significant casualties during its recapture by the Spanish. Governor Diego de Vargas evicted them from their pueblo in 1695, resettling it with Mexicans. The people were first relocated to Pecos Pueblo, many of whose inhabitants are later thought to have migrated to the Tewa villages on the Hopi First Mesa.

== See also ==
- Puye Cliff Dwellings
- National Register of Historic Places listings in Santa Fe County, New Mexico
- List of National Historic Landmarks in New Mexico
