= Tsankawi =

Archeological site in New Mexico, United States

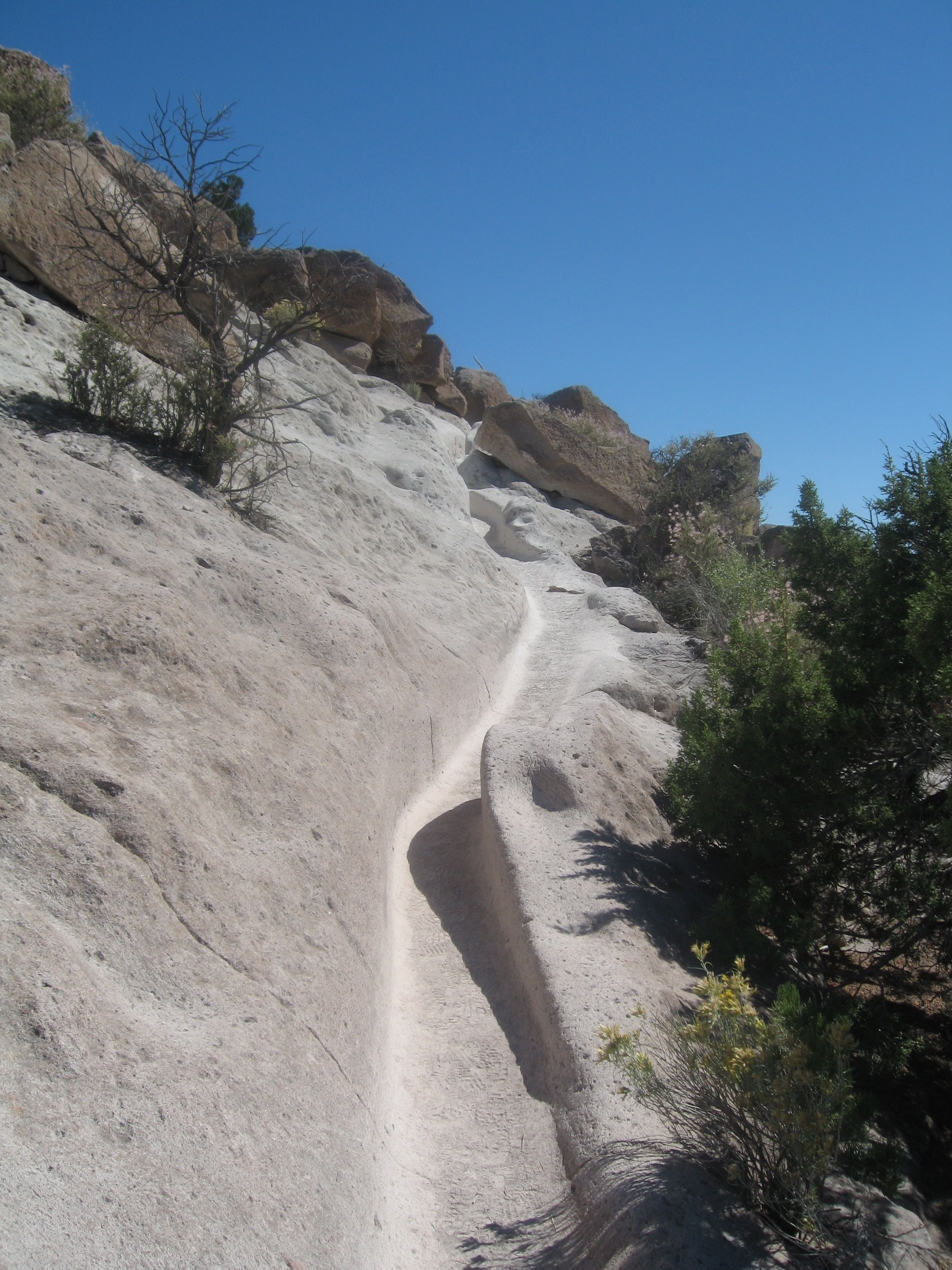
- Tsankawi, ancient foot path
- Interactive map of Tsankawi
- Nearest city: White Rock
- Coordinates: 35°51′43″N 106°12′55″W
- Owner: National Park Service
- Website: www.nps.gov/places/tsankawi.htm

Tsankawi (Note: /səŋˈkɑːwiː/ səng-KAH-wee) (Tewa: Są̈́kʼewikwʼáyeh Ówîngeh Kayyee, pronounced [sæ̃́kʼèwìkʷʼɑ́yè ʔówîŋɡè kèːjìː]) is a detached portion of Bandelier National Monument near White Rock, New Mexico. It is accessible from a roadside parking area, just north of the intersection of East Jemez Road and State Road 4. A self-guided 1.5-mile loop trail provides access to numerous unexcavated ruins, caves carved into soft tuff, and petroglyphs.

== Etymology ==
Tsankawi comes from the Tewa name given by the San Ildefonso Puebloans, Są̈́kʼewikwʼáyeh Ówîngeh Kayyee, which roughly translates to "mesa ruin of the sharp gap of prickly pear cacti" (są̈́ą̈, 'Opuntia' + kʼe 'sharp' + wi 'gap' + kwʼáyeh ''height'', ówîngeh 'village', kayyee 'old thing') or more simply Są̈́kʼewiʼi "sharp gap of prickly pear cacti".

== History ==
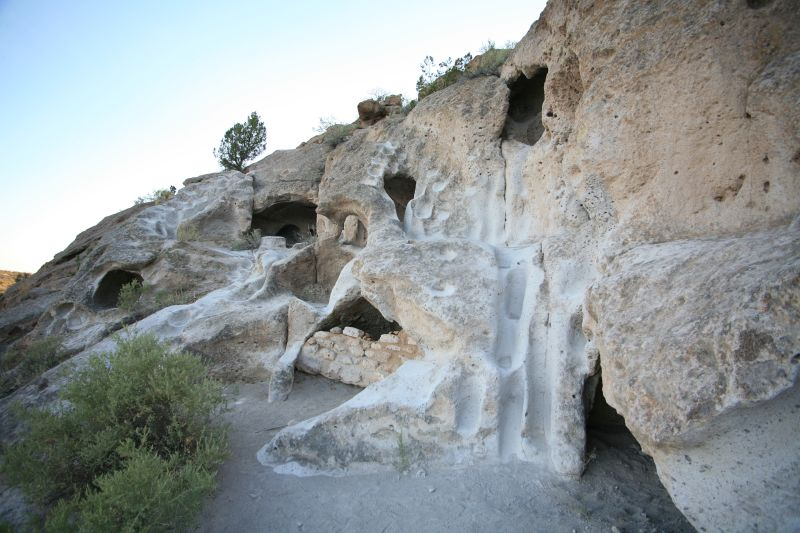
Cavate cliff dwellings (one walled up) with steps worn into the soft tuff.

Tsankawi was built and occupied by the Ancestral Puebloan people. Archeological evidence indicates that Tsankawi may have been constructed in the 15th century and occupied until the late 16th century, toward the end of the Rio Grande Classic Period. Dendrochronology (tree-ring dating) indicates that a severe drought occurred in the late 16th century. Traditions at several Tewa Pueblos, including San Ildefonso Pueblo, Santa Clara Pueblo, Pojoaque Pueblo, and Tesuque Pueblo claim ancestral ties to Tsankawi and other nearby pueblo sites.

Archeological evidence indicates that Indigenous people first settled the surrounding area in small communities during the late 12th century. Over time, fewer but larger communities were built, and Tsankawi was one of these larger communities. According to Pueblo tradition, the people of Tsankawi spoke Tewa, while those in Frijoles Canyon (the main section of Bandelier) spoke Keres. While their languages were different, their religious beliefs, lifestyles, and worldviews were similar. Even today, the active pueblos San Ildefonso and Cochiti retain strong social and traditional ties with these two cultural sites.

The 1.5-mile trail through Tsankawi takes the viewer along centuries-old paths of the ancestral Pueblo people. In many areas, the trails have been worn into the rock 8 to 24 inches or more, as the natives traveled from the mesa tops to their farms in the canyons below. The trails also connected to other villages in the surrounding area - the travelers commonly wore sandals or walked barefoot.

Much of the site has never been excavated. Edgar Hewett, however, excavated at least 2 burial mounds near the main pueblo room blocks during his studies of the area during the late 1800s and early 1900s.

== Tsankawi village ==
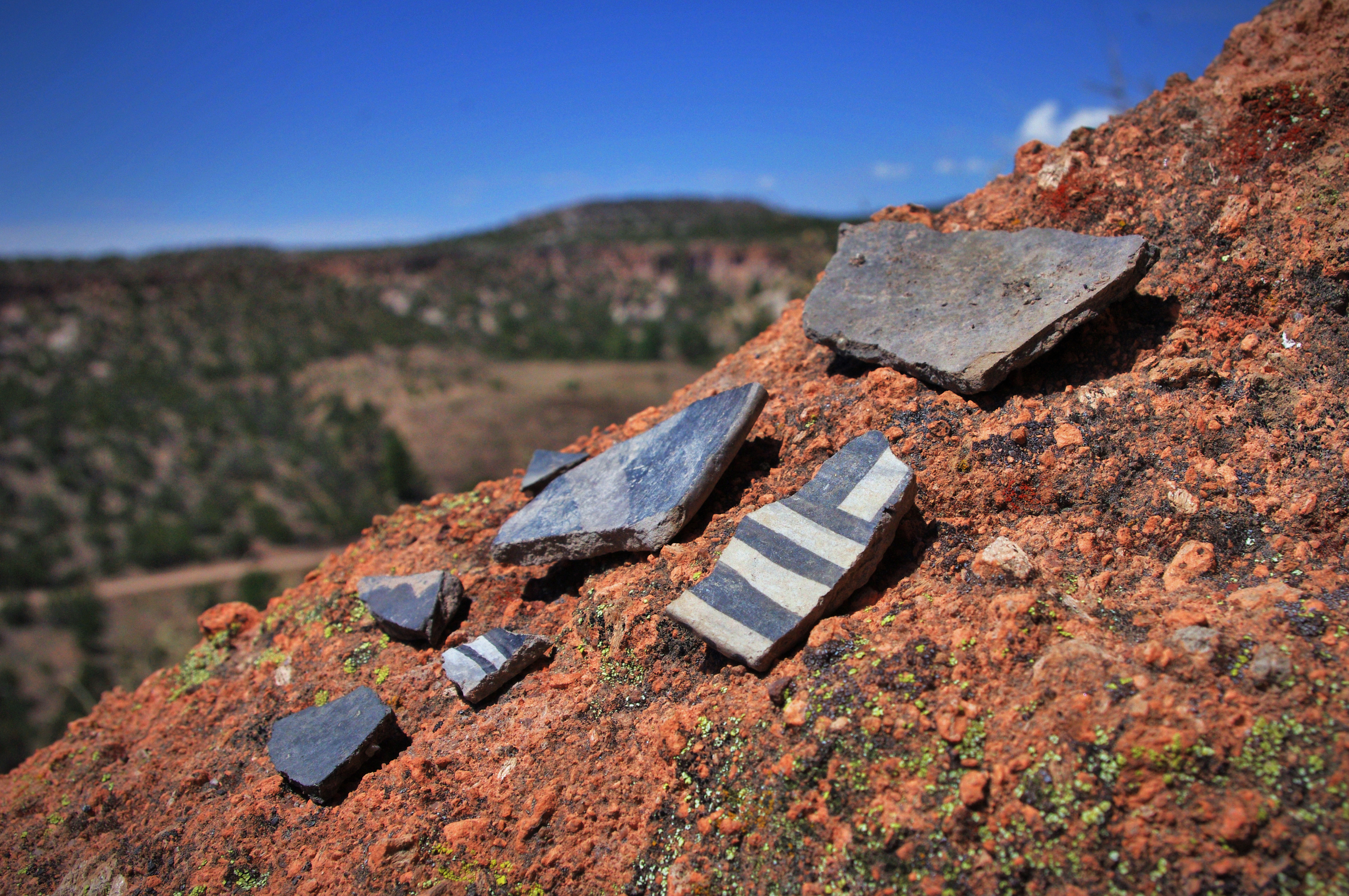
Pottery sherds near Tsankawi

The village was built out of tuff stone (plastered inside) and mud. It was roughly rectangular in shape, with about 350 rooms and an enclosed central courtyard or plaza. Various rooms were used for cooking, sleeping, and for storing food for the winter months or when crops failed. The architectural design with rooms surrounding a central plaza is still used by present-day Puebloans. The buildings were two or three stories high, with roofs made of wood and mud.

The Tsankawi inhabitants were dependent upon the environment for survival. The climate was dry, averaging 15 inches of rainfall a year, yet the inhabitants developed an agricultural way of life. They used native plants such as the piñon pine, juniper, rabbitbrush, saltbush, mountain mahogany, and yucca for food, dyes, medicine, and tools. They also cultivated corn, beans, and squash. However, natural resources were scarce in this sparse environment, and over time, the Puebloans depleted their resources. Firewood became hard to find, and the soil became exhausted due to centuries of farming. During the 16th century, an extended drought, indicated by tree ring dating, forced the inhabitants to move on. The pueblo at San Ildefonso, 8 miles (13 km) away, has the tradition that their ancestors lived at Tsankawi and the surrounding area.

The people of Tsankawi were not isolated. There were many villages on nearby mesas or in the canyons. The people traded tools, blankets, pottery, feathers, turquoise, seashells, and agricultural products, and they also joined together for religious activities. The village plaza may have been a gathering place for dancing and ceremonies.

Since there was no metal, tools were made from local materials. Obsidian formed by the Jemez volcanoes were used to make arrow points, knives, and scrapers. Volcanic basalt was used as manos and metates to grind seeds and corn; it was also used to enlarge the soft tuff caves and shape blocks used in building.

After the inhabitants left in the late 16th century, the buildings fell into ruin. The roofs collapsed, and the walls crumbled. Wind-blown materials filled the cracks and crevices so that only mounds of rubble could be seen with pieces of pottery lying on the ground.

== Tsankawi cave dwellings ==
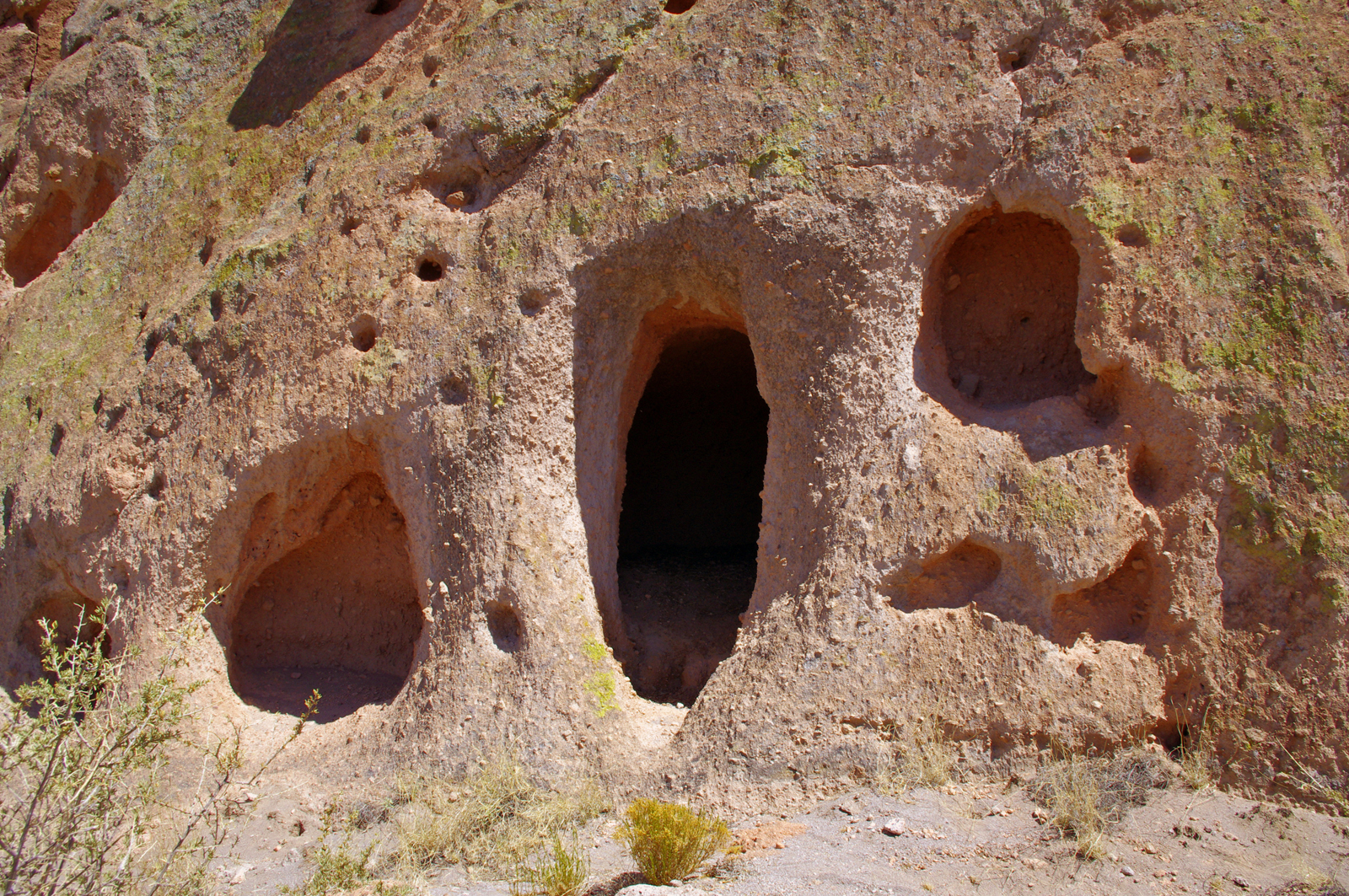
Cavate Entrances, Tsankawi

The ancient pueblo inhabitants of Tsankawi not only had a settlement on top of the mesa, but they built their homes along the base of the cliffs. They dug caves into the soft, tuff stone and extended the dwelling with walls made of talus rock mortared with mud. The roofs were made with timber and mud. These dwellings are called talus pueblos. 354 talus pueblos have been documented on Tsankawi Mesa, with most located at the boundary between the Tshirege and Otowi members of the Bandelier Tuff that forms the bedrock of the mesa.

Since the time that the talus pueblos were inhabited, the masonry walls have collapsed. The only remaining evidence is caves, or cavates, carved into the cliffs and socket holes which were used to support timber for the roofs. While they were not exposed to the elements, the caves are blackened from fires used for cooking and heat during the winter months. The talus pueblos were built on the south facing side of the mesas.

During the winter months, the afternoon sun would warm the southern cliffs, melting the snow. However, the north-facing cliffs frequently had snow all winter long. The walls were plastered with clay, perhaps for aesthetic reasons, or to help prevent the walls from crumbling. Artwork along the walls can be seen in a number of the caves in the form of pictographs carved into the rock and painting remnants where clay still sticks to the walls.

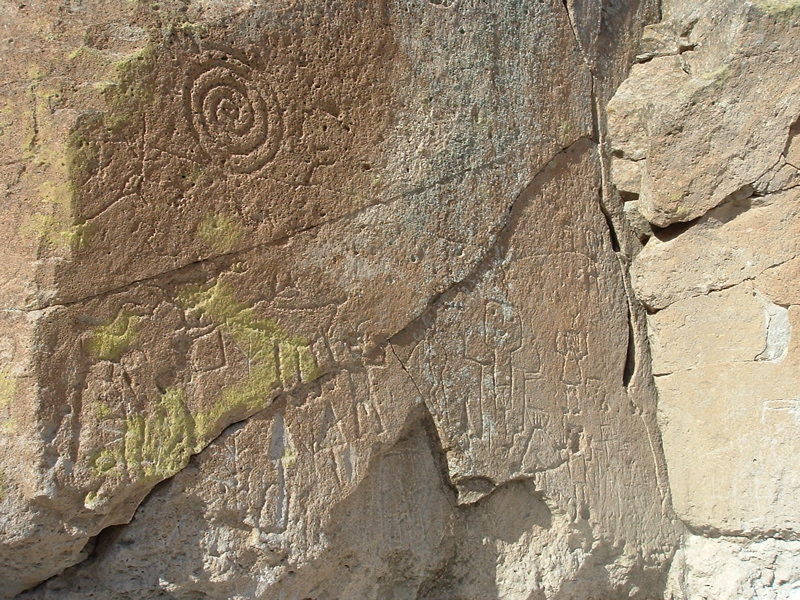
Tsankawi petroglyphs

== Tsankawi petroglyphs ==
Numerous petroglyphs (designs carved into stone) can be found around Tsankawi, located along the cliffs and in some of the cave dwellings. Carvings were made in soft, tuff stone which is easily eroded, meaning many drawings have become difficult to see or have disappeared altogether. Some of the meanings of the figures are known among modern-day Indigenous people and are culturally significant to them. Among the petroglyphs are figures of people, animals, birds, four-pointed stars and other designs.

Similar carvings can be found at Frijoles canyon and an extensive collection of petroglyphs can be found south of Bandelier National Monument at Petroglyph National Monument.

== Duchess castle ==
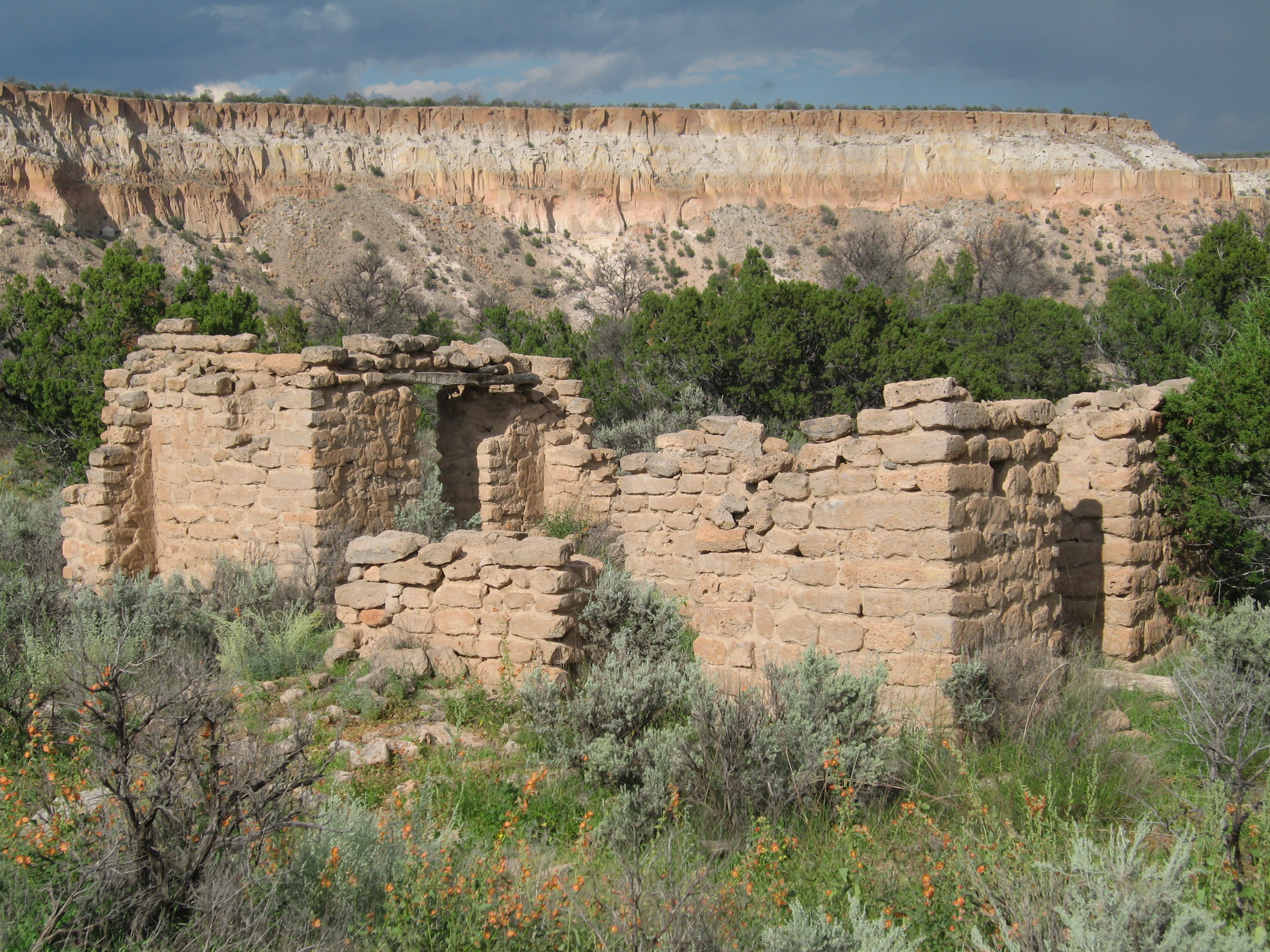
Remains of Duchess Castle, looking toward the northeast.

To the northeast are the remains of a home and school built by Madame Vera von Blumenthal (not actually a duchess but a baroness) and her lover Rose Dougan in 1918. They provided instruction to the potters of local pueblos on how to revive techniques with the intent of making the pottery more collectable, which would, in turn, provide income to the pueblo community.

== Directions ==
The Tsankawi section of Bandelier National Monument is located on State Highway 4, twelve miles from the main section of the park.

GPS coordinates of entrance: 35.859, -106.224

== See also ==
- Tsirege
- Puye Cliff Dwellings

== Bibliography ==
- "Edward S. Curtis's The North American Indian Volume 17". Archived from the original on May 13, 2007.
- "Tsankawi Trail Guide".
- "Tsankawi". Scienceviews.com.
- "Tsankawi Cave Dwellings". Scienceviews.com.
- "Tsankawi Petroglyphs". Scienceviews.com.
