= Bis sa'ani =

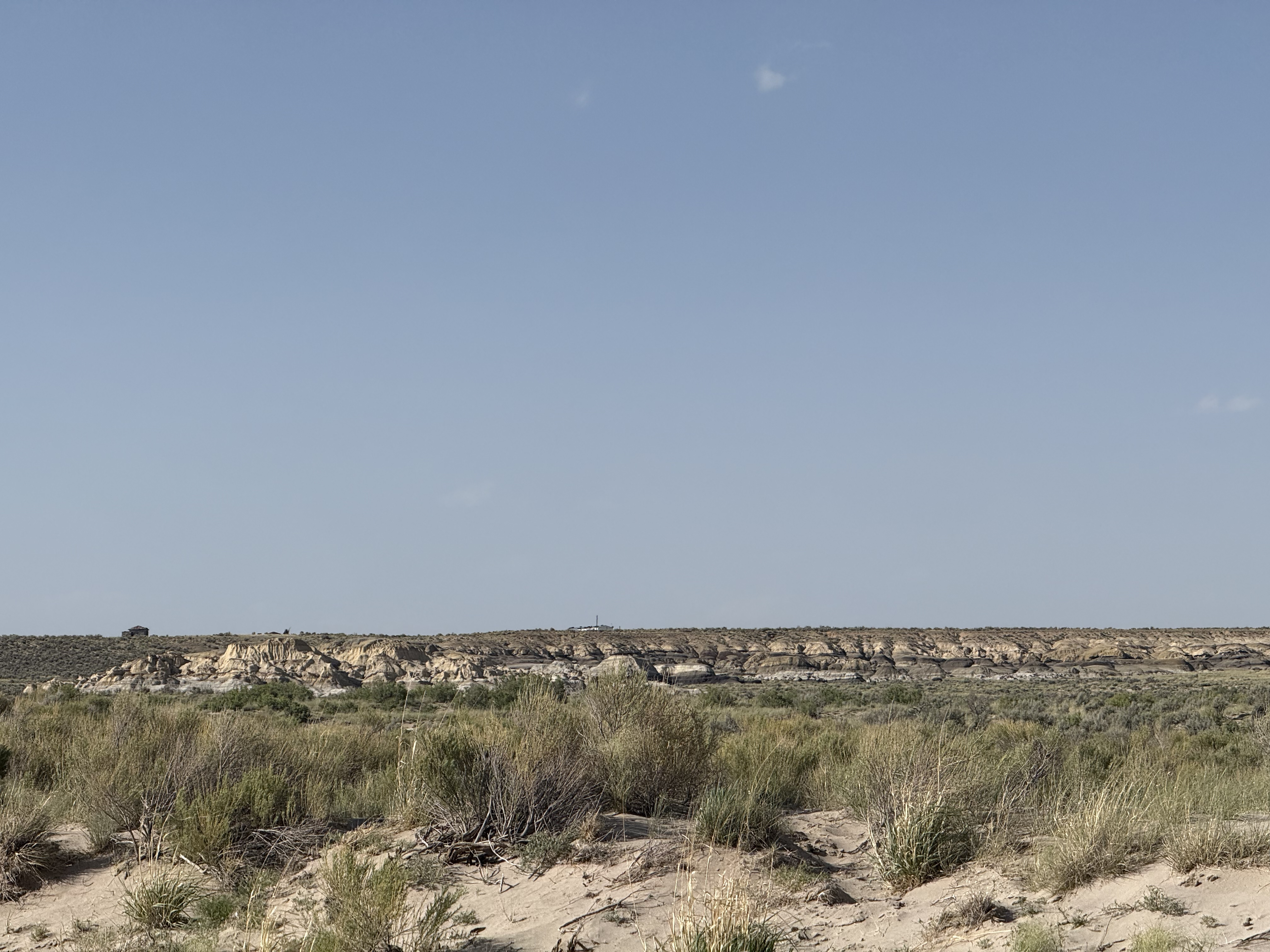
Bis sa’ani area from the Escvada Wash

Bis sa'ani (Navajo: "clay in place") is an Ancestral Puebloan great house and small house community and archeological site.

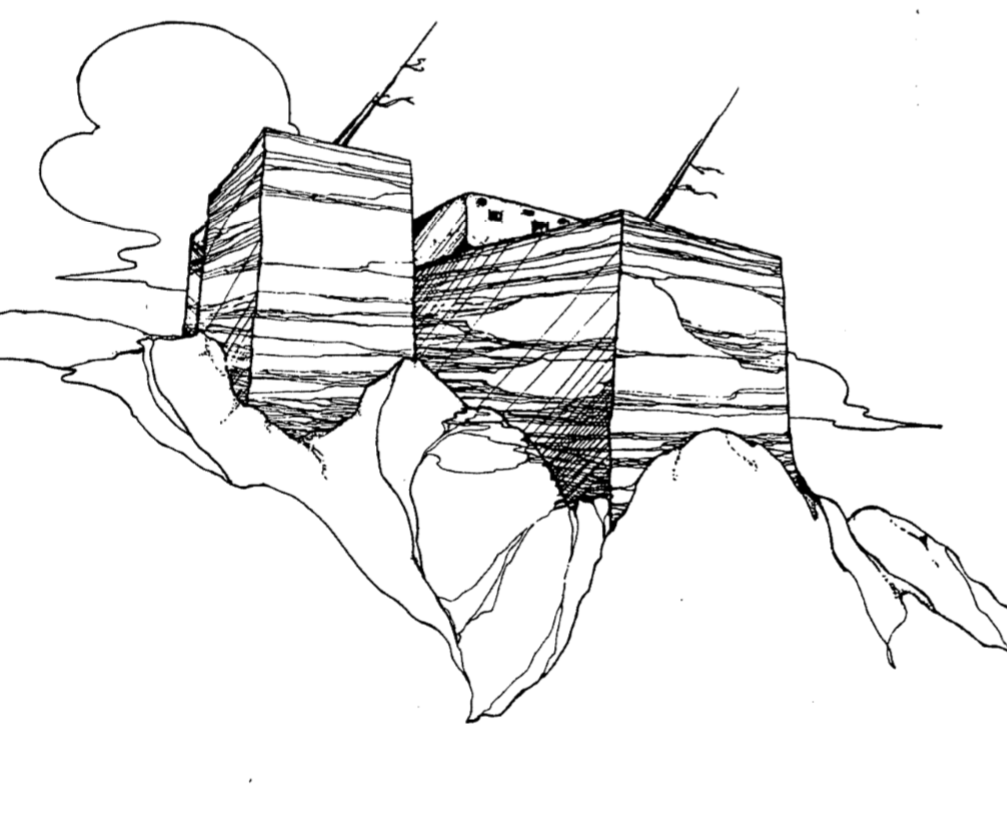
Artist's reconstruction of Bis sa'ani, c. 1150 CE. Casa Hormiga, Casa Quemada, and South House kiva (l. to r.); vertical height of retaining walls approximately 26 feet (7.9 m)

Located in Chaco Canyon, New Mexico, United States, it contains thirty-five rooms and lies near the south of Escavada Wash 8 miles (13 km) from Pueblo Bonito. While outside the canyon, it is not considered an outlier, but included within the core group of ruins. There are several small house sites in the area, but no great kiva. Bis sa'ani was occupied during the early 11th century.

Coordinates: 36°05′15″N 107°47′20″W
