= Senecú =

Former pueblo in New Mexico

The Piro pueblo of Senecú was the southernmost occupied pueblo in New Mexico prior to the Pueblo Revolt of 1680. It was located on the west bank of the Rio Grande within sight of the Piro pueblo of San Pasqual. Colonial Spanish documents consistently place the pueblo opposite of Black Mesa, which is near San Marcial. Due to changes in the floodplain and the establishment of San Marcial, however, no surface remains of the pueblo survive in the area.

The original name of the pueblo has been transcribed as either Tze-no-que, Tzen-o-cue, or She-an-ghua. This has been translated as either "eye socket" or "spring hole", but neither translation can be corroborated.

== History ==
The pueblo was occupied by Piro Indians prior to Spanish exploration of the area. It appears to have been described by Spaniards as early as 1581 in the journals of the Chamuscado and Rodríguez Expedition. In 1598, the Juan de Oñate expedition described a "Tzenaquel de la Mesilla", which was the first settlement that they came across while traveling through New Mexico.

The Spanish mission of San Antonio de Padua was built in Senecú in the 1620s. The mission survived for about half a century, but both the pueblo and the mission were destroyed by Apache raiders on 23 January 1675. A Franciscan priest was killed during the raid, however many Piro and Spaniards survived.

Luis López, the namesake of the village of Luis Lopez, was the alcalde of Senecú in 1667.

The pueblo was resettled in November or December 1677 by reportedly over 100 Christian Indian families. It was once again abandoned during the Pueblo Revolt of 1680 when the Piro followed the Spaniards out of New Mexico. Rather than return to New Mexico, the people of this pueblo settled in the El Paso district in a village called Senecú del Sur. Rumors have it that some Piro stayed in New Mexico, however Diego de Vargas did not find anyone inhabiting the pueblo when he passed by it in 1691 and 1692. The pueblo was not resettled after the Spanish re-conquest. The pueblo's ruins were visible to travelers throughout the 18th century, but they have not been seen since then.
