= Puye Cliff Dwellings =

- Puye Ruins
- U.S. National Register of Historic Places
- U.S. National Historic Landmark
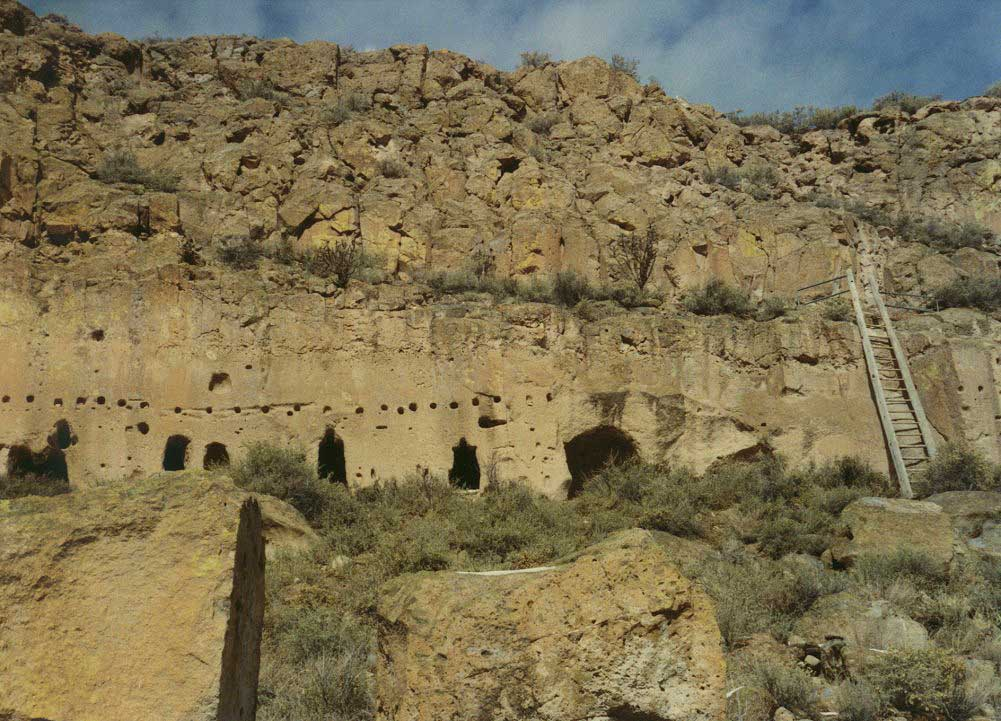
- Entrances to the dwellings

- Location within New Mexico
- Nearest city: Española, New Mexico
- Coordinates: 35°58′32″N 106°13′39″W
- Area: 1,350 acres (550 ha)
- Built: 1250
- Website: "Puye Cliffs Welcome Center]".
- NRHP reference No.: 66000481

Significant dates
- Added to NRHP: October 15, 1966
- Designated NHL: May 23, 1966

The Puye Cliff Dwellings (Santa Clara Tewa: Puujé Ówîngeh Kayjee) are the ruins of an abandoned pueblo, located in Santa Clara Canyon on Santa Clara Pueblo Reservation land near Española, New Mexico. Established in the late 1200s or early 1300s and abandoned by about 1600, this is among the largest of the prehistoric Indian settlements on the Pajarito Plateau, showing a variety of architectural forms and building techniques.

The site was declared a National Historic Landmark in 1966.

The name Puye (Tewa language: pu, “cottontail rabbits,” and ye, "to assemble") possibly suggests a place for hunting rabbits.

== Ancient pueblo dwellings ==
The Puye Cliffs complex includes two levels of cliff-dwellings and both surface and cave dwellings. The two levels of cliff dwellings, the mesa top and reconstructed 'Community House' are accessed by paths and about twelve stairways and ladders cut into the side of the cliff. One level of cliff dwellings is over 1 mile (1.6 km) long and the second is about 2,100 feet (640 m) long.

The ruins are within the northern end of the Puye Formation, a geologic formation of pyroclastic and block and ash flows exposed east of the Jemez Mountains. The dwellings were carved out of soft volcanic tuff (the Bandelier Tuff) on about a 200 feet (61 m) cliff ridge. The rock is relatively soft and can be excavated using wooden tools. The cliff dwellings held about 740 rooms and ruins at the base of the cliff that likely held additional dwellings. On top of the mesa are cave dwellings of the Pueblo II Era around which a multi-storied puebloan village was built. The south portion of the complex had 173 rooms on the ground floor. The total number of rooms is not known, but would include rooms on the northern side of the complex and the upper levels. In the center of the complex was a large plaza.

Between 900 and 1580, up to 1500 Pueblo people lived in the area where they hunted game and cultivated food. Native peoples first settled in the area in the late 10th century of the Pueblo II Era, living in dispersed farmstead dwellings at the east side of the Jemez Mountains. Their settlements increased and changed over time in the Pueblo III Era, when they lived in larger, concentrated villages of Otowi, Puye, Shufinne, Tsankawi, Tsirege, and Tyuonyi.

About 1580 (after the end of the Pueblo IV Era) drought finally forced the villagers to leave for locations nearer to the Rio Grande valley. Present day inhabitants of Santa Clara Pueblo, some 10 miles (16 km) to the east, claim to be descendants of the Puye residents.

In 1907 Edgar Hewett, with the Southwest Society of the Archaeological Institute of America, excavated Puye Cliffs. It was the first systematic excavation of a prehistoric pueblo in the Rio Grande valley.

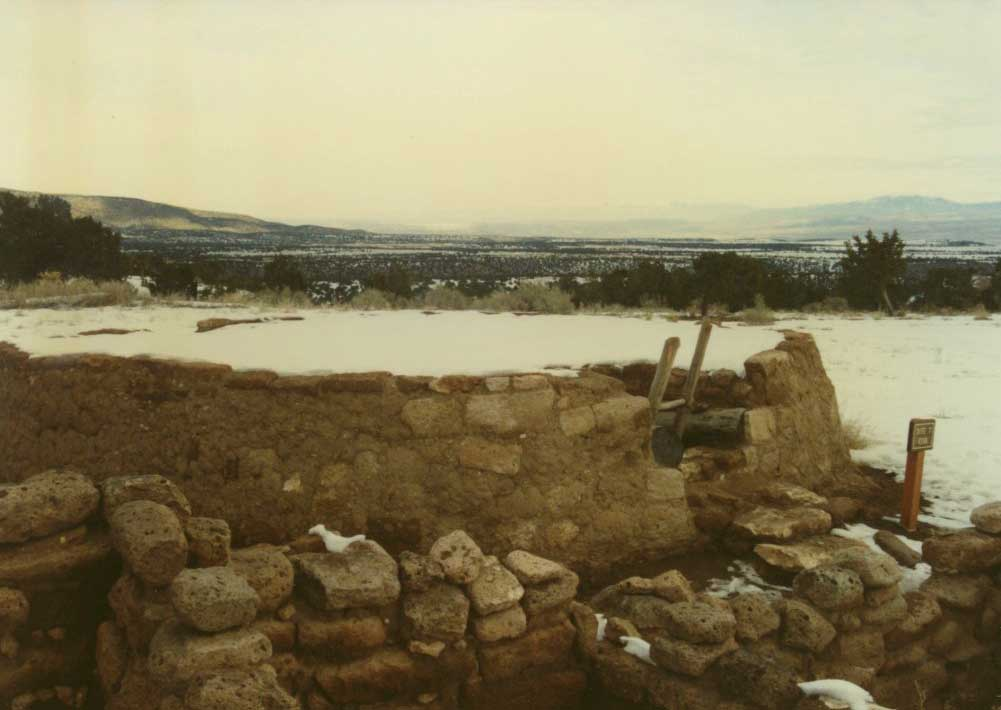
Kiva and ruins on top of mesa

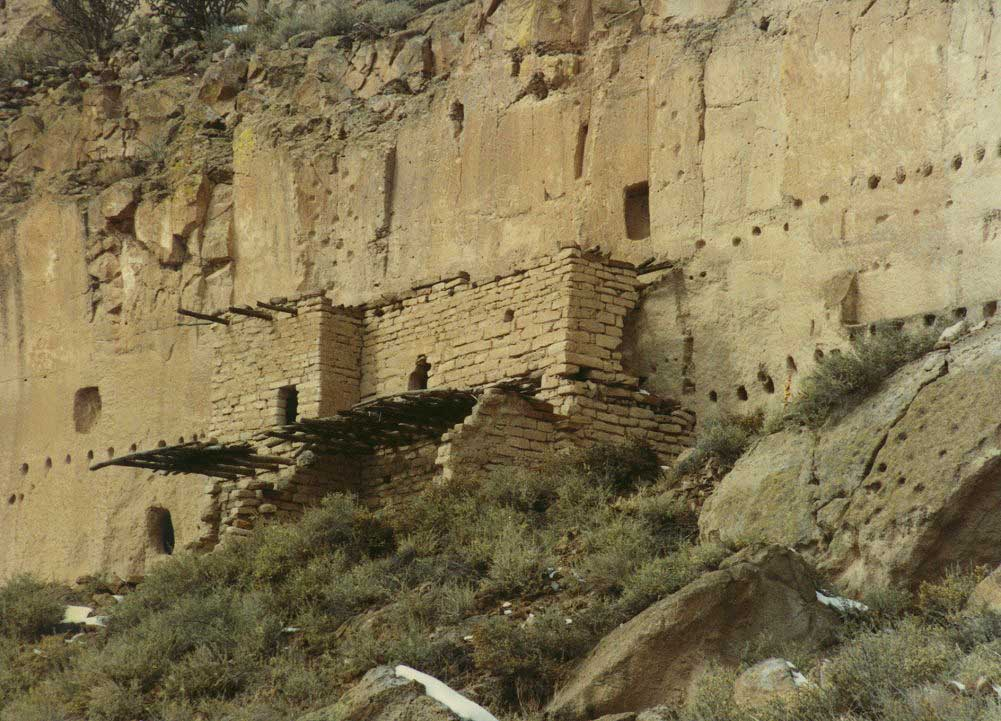
Cliff dwellings, with partial reconstruction

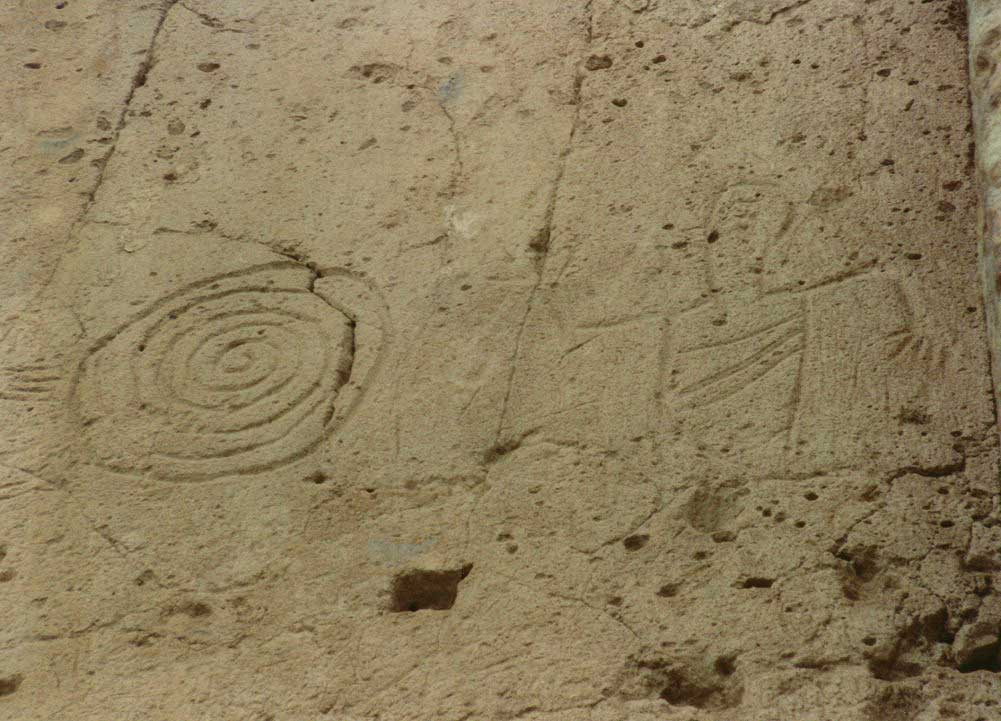
Petroglyphs

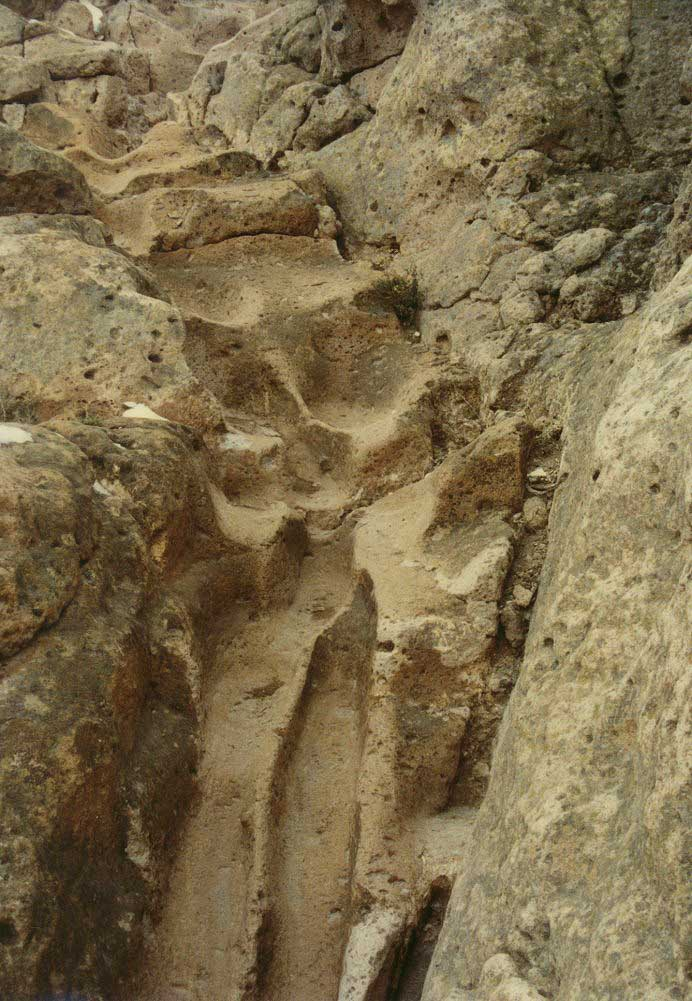
Steps, worn into the rock

== Recent history ==
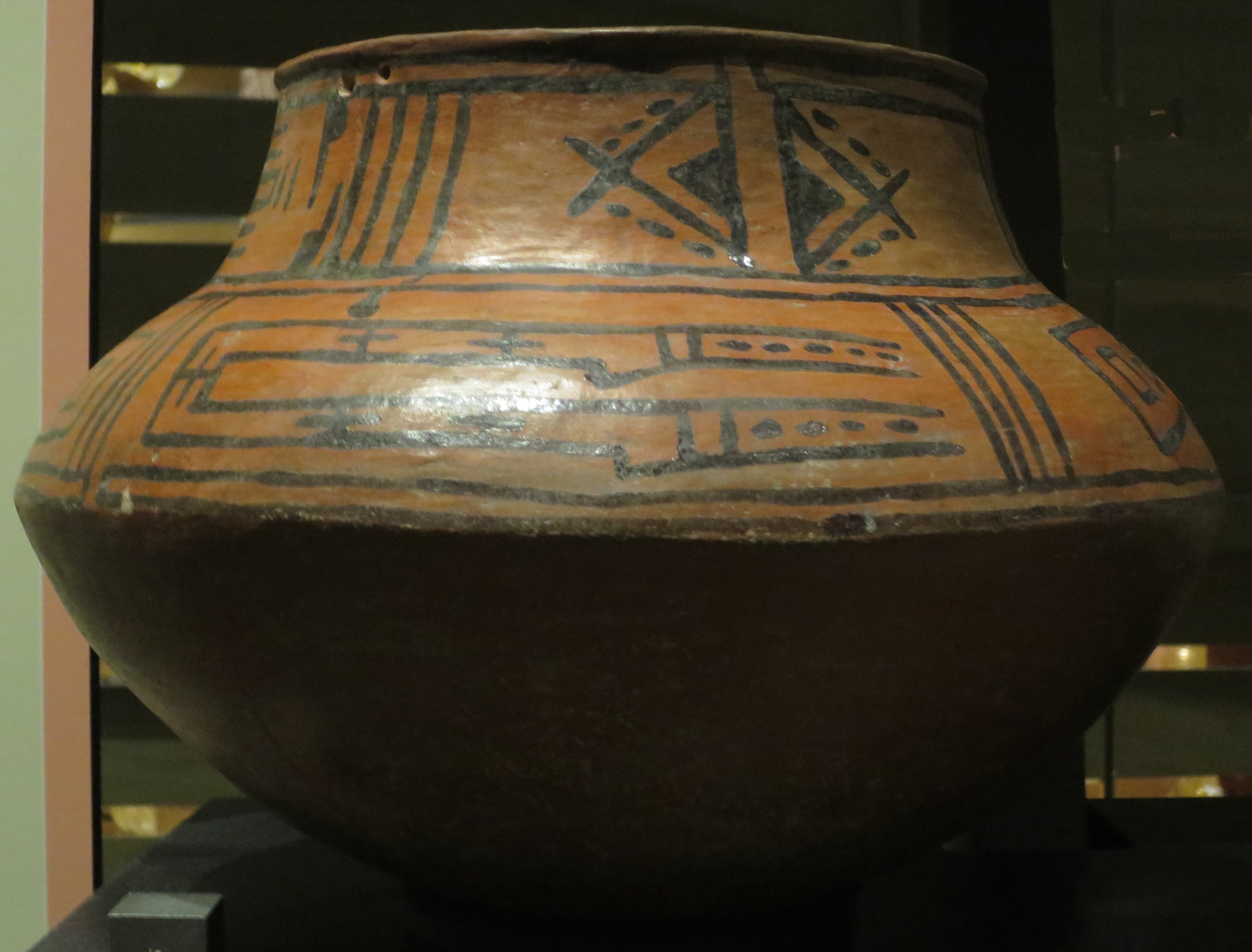
San Lazaro glazed polychrome jar c. 1490-1550 CE, found at Otowi Pueblo near Puye, Heard Museum

The cliff dwellings were declared a National Historic Landmark in 1966, under the name of "Puye Ruins."

In 2000, a planned burn of trees in Bandelier National Monument burned out of control. The resulting wildfire, known as the Cerro Grande Fire, eventually claimed 46,925 acres (189.90 km^{2}), some 250 houses in Los Alamos, and devastated Santa Clara Canyon. Puye Cliff Dwellings site has been reopened to the public. Current information can be obtained from Santa Clara Pueblo.

Tours can be scheduled to explore the cliffs and learn of their history. The site is available to the public within opening hours. Visitors must check in through the Puye Cliffs Welcome Center.

== In popular culture ==
The area features extensively in the 1952 film The Atomic City.

== See also ==
- List of National Historic Landmarks in New Mexico
- National Register of Historic Places listings in Rio Arriba County, New Mexico
- National Register of Historic Places listings in Sandoval County, New Mexico
- Tsankawi
- Tsirege
