= Socorro Consolidated Schools =

School district in New Mexico, United States

Socorro Consolidated School District (SCSD) or Socorro Consolidated Schools is a school district headquartered in Socorro, New Mexico.

Located within Socorro County, the district includes Socorro, Alamillo, Chamizal, Escondida, Lemitar, Luis Lopez, Polvadera, San Acacia, San Antonio, and San Antonito.

== History ==
Randall K. Earwood became the superintendent in 2012.

In 2020 Ron Hendrix, the superintendent that year, advocated for opening the 2020–2021 school year, during the COVID-19 pandemic in New Mexico, with students physically at school instead of virtual learning.

== Schools ==
Secondary schools

- Socorro High School
- Sarracino Middle School

Elementary schools

- Midway Elementary School
- Parkview Elementary School
- San Antonio Elementary

Charter schools

- Cottonwood Valley Charter
