= Pilabó =

Pilabó was a former Piro pueblo located on the site of the present city of Socorro, New Mexico, United States. In 1598, the vanguard of the Spanish colonizing caravan under Juan de Oñate acquired food at the Piro pueblo of Teypana. The Spaniards named that pueblo “Socorro” which means “help” or “aid” in Spanish. Eventually, a different but nearby pueblo, Pilabó, would be given the name "Socorro" following the May/June 1626 founding of the mission of Nuestra Señora del Socorro. Some buried remains of Pilabó are still present south and southeast of the current church of San Miguel (established in the early 1800s on the ruins of the post-1626 church of Nuestra Señora which was destroyed in 1680/81) in Socorro.
