= Small house (pueblo) =

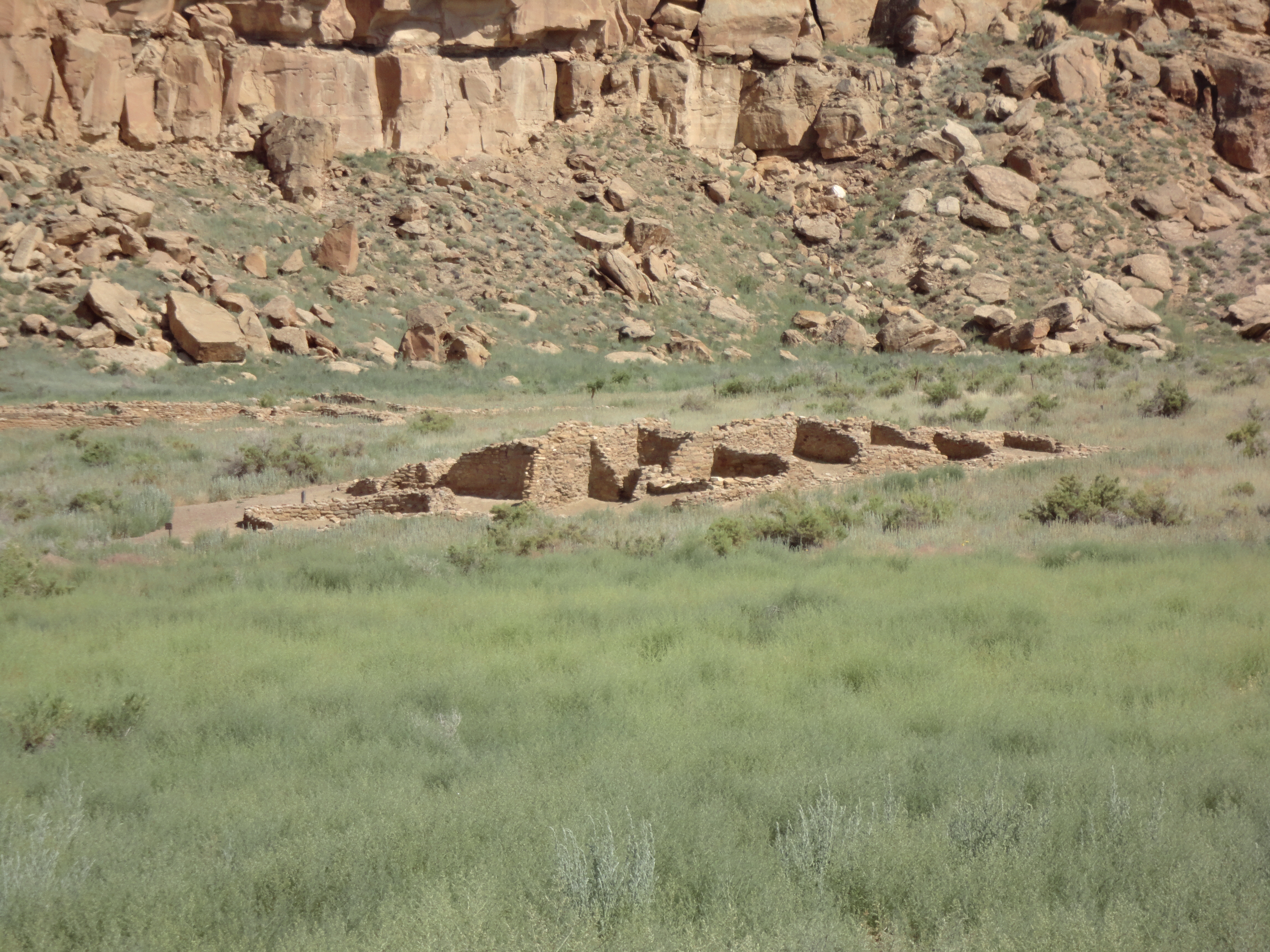
A Chacoan small house site near Casa Rinconada, in Chaco Culture National Historical Park, New Mexico

Small house (or small house site) refers to small masonry dwellings built by the Ancestral Puebloans. There are hundreds of small house sites in Chaco Canyon. They were first constructed during the late 8th and early 9th centuries, about fifty to seventy-five years before work began on great houses. They differ from great houses in that they do not feature core-and-veneer construction, nor do they include great kivas. Archeologists believe that the residents of small house sites were connected by marriage or kinship, and were part of larger communities based on association with nearby great houses.

== Puebloan small houses ==
=== Sites ===
- Andrews Outlier
- Bis sa'ani
- Hogback Outlier
- Navajo Springs Outlier

=== Individual houses ===
- Leyit Kin
- Lizard House
