= Hogback Outlier =

Hogback Outlier is an Ancestral Puebloan outlier community located 50 miles (80 km) northwest of Chaco Culture National Historical Park, New Mexico. The community features a great house, great kiva, and thirty-five small house sites.
