= Leyit Kin =

Leyit Kin (Navajo: "way down deep house") is an Ancestral Puebloan small house archeological site located 1 mile (1.6 km) southeast of Pueblo Bonito near the south end of Chaco Canyon in New Mexico, United States. Leyit Kin contains three kivas and twenty-seven rooms. It was occupied during three distinct periods ending in the late 12th century. The site was partially excavated in 1934 and 1936, but backfilling has made the structures nearly indistinguishable from the surrounding landscape.
