= Little San Pascual Mountain =

Mountain in Socorro County, New Mexico, United States

Coordinates: 33°43′14″N 106°51′37″W

Little San Pascual Mountain is a summit in Socorro County, New Mexico. It rises to an elevation of 5,485 feet (1,672 meters).
