= Kin Ya'a =

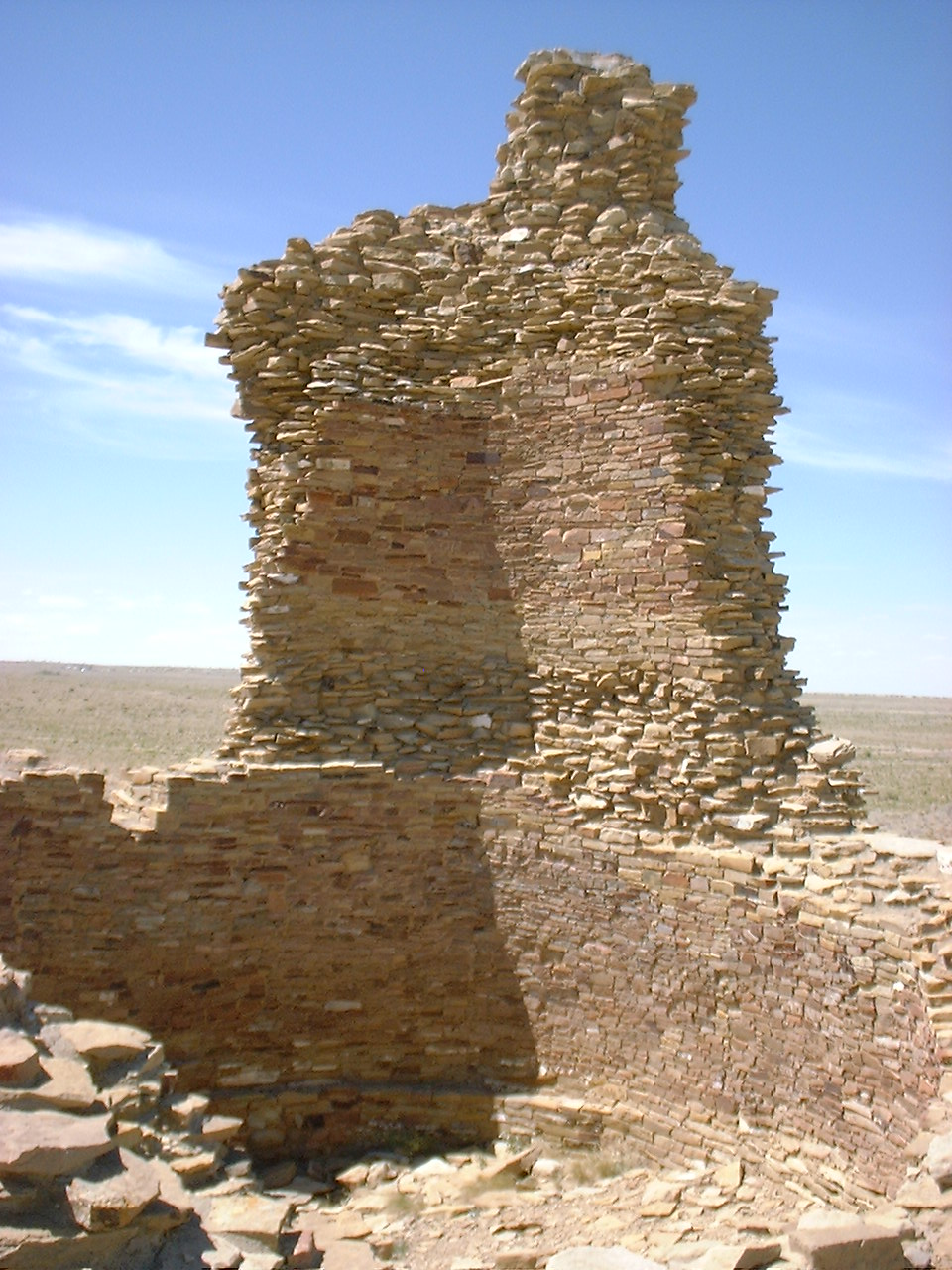

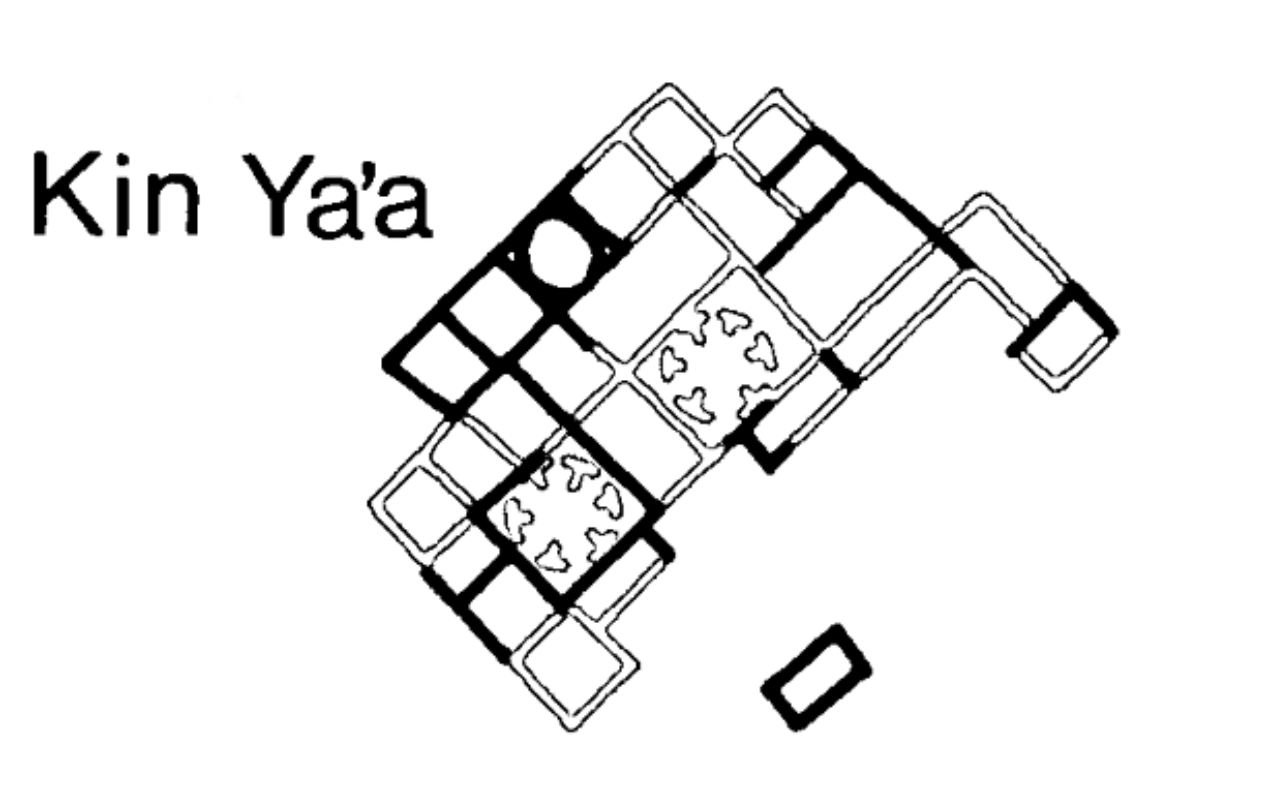
- Site map (darker lines denote excavated areas)
- 36.06°N 107.95°W
- Location: Chaco Culture National Historical Park, New Mexico, United States
- Nearest city: Gallup, New Mexico

History
- Built: 1080–1100

Site notes
- Architectural style: Ancestral Puebloan
- Governing body: National Park Service

Kin Ya'a (Navajo: "tall house") is a Chacoan great house and the center of a significant Ancestral Puebloan outlier community. It is located near Crownpoint, New Mexico on the Dutton Plateau, 25 miles (40 km) south of Chaco Canyon.

The unexcavated building has thirty-five rooms and four kivas, one of which is a four-story tower kiva that can be seen from several miles away. Dendrochronology indicates the structure was built during the late 11th and early 12th centuries. More than one hundred small building sites have been located within 4 square miles (10 km^{2}). The great house is connected to Chaco Canyon by the South Road. As a detached unit of Chaco Culture National Historical Park, the site is controlled by the National Park Service.
