= Andrews Outlier =

Archaeological site in New Mexico, US

Andrews Outlier is an Ancestral Puebloan archeological site located in the Red Mesa Valley in the southern portion of the San Juan Basin, approximately 50 miles (80 km) south of Chaco Canyon, New Mexico, United States. The site is notable for its three great kivas and thirty small house structures. The area has not been excavated, but the visible architecture indicates that the primary purpose of the buildings was community rituals. Andrews Outlier was occupied from around 900 to 1100 CE. The site is owned by The Archaeological Conservancy and administered by the US Bureau of Land Management.
