= San Antonio, New Mexico =

Census-designated place in Socorro County, New Mexico

Coordinates: 33°54′58″N 106°52′12″W

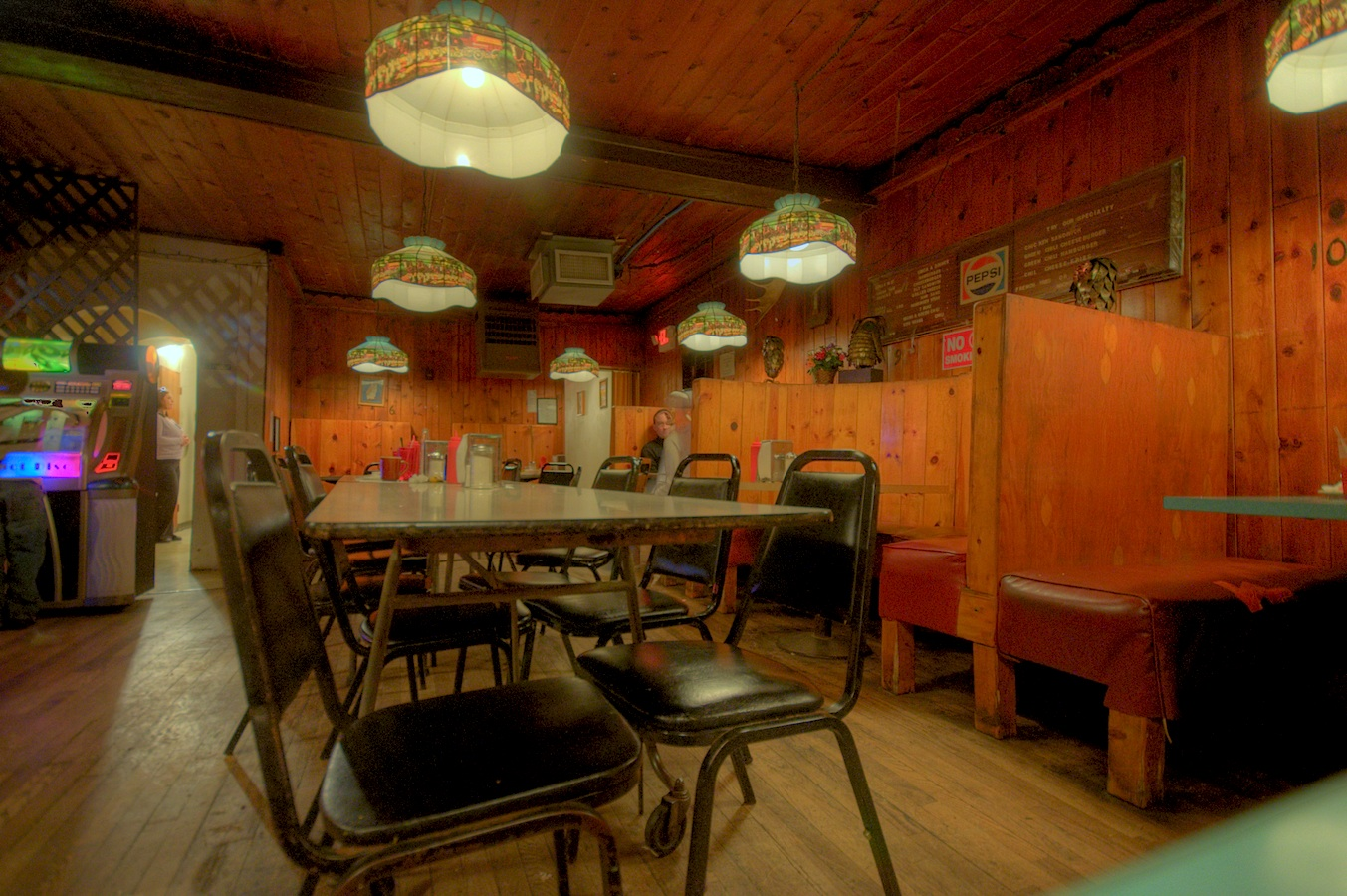
Owl Bar & Cafe, a San Antonio landmark

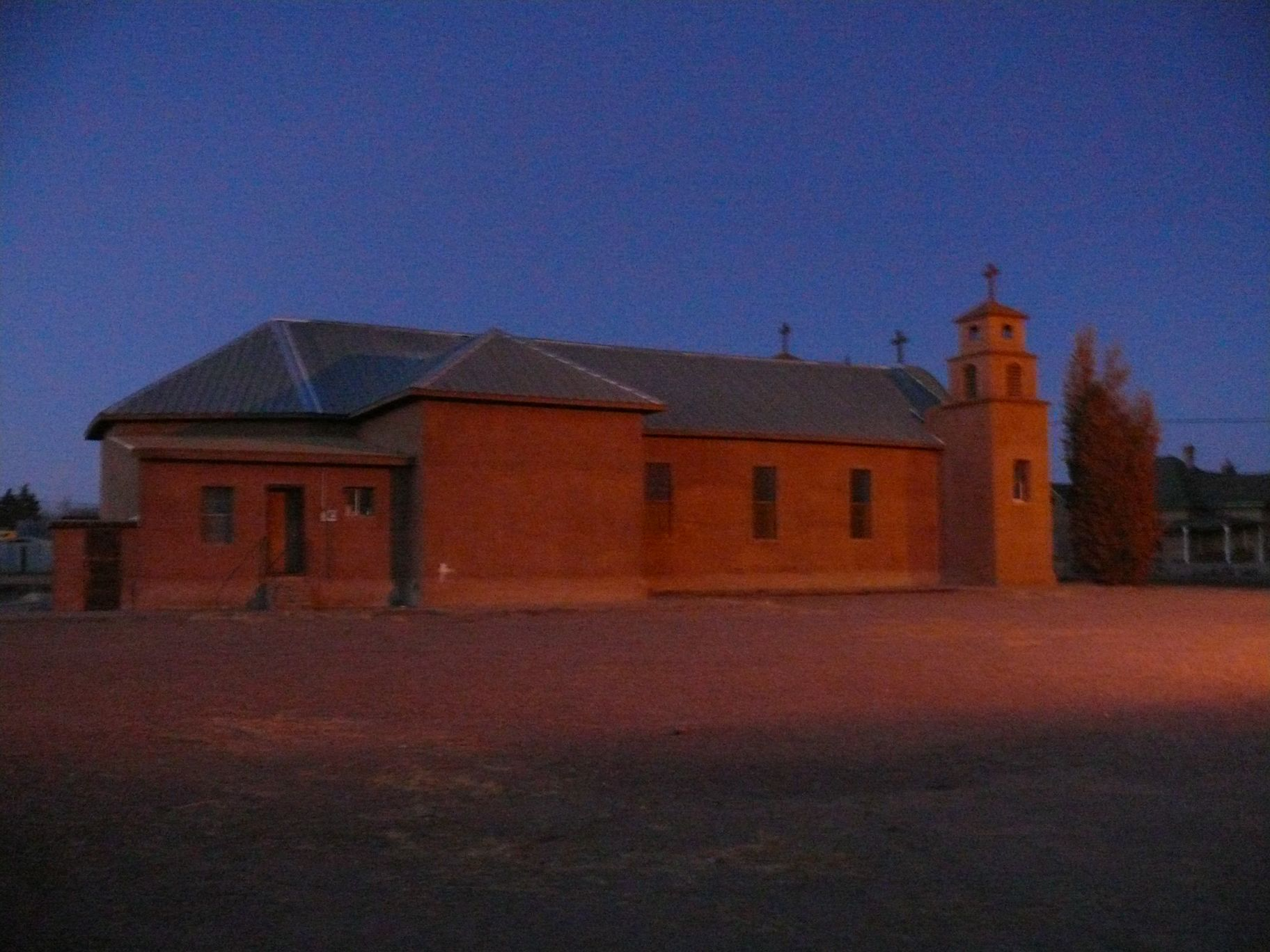
San Antonio church

San Antonio is a census-designated place in Socorro County, New Mexico, United States. As of the 2020 census, San Antonio had a population of 113. It is roughly in the center of the state, on the Rio Grande.

== Description ==
San Antonio is partly agricultural, and partly a bedroom community for Socorro.

San Antonio is the gateway to the Bosque del Apache National Wildlife Refuge. Interstate 25 runs along the west, and U.S. Route 380 begins there and heads east to Carrizozo. The Rio Grande is just to the east of San Antonio, and the BNSF Railway runs through the community and has a small yard, little more than a siding.

While still part of the New Mexico Territory, the town was the birthplace of Conrad Hilton. His father was a merchant and hotelier in San Antonio, and Hilton learned the hotel trade there. Hilton was one of the original legislators in the newly formed state of New Mexico, and founded the Hilton Hotels Corporation.

San Antonio is about 28 miles from Trinity Site, where the first nuclear bomb was detonated on July 16, 1945. Residents reported tremors like an earthquake and the town received some of the remnants of the mushroom cloud, resulting in some radioactive contamination of the area, which faded quickly and does not persist today. The town was the meeting place for the scientists who detonated the bomb.

The city supports a few small businesses, which include the original Owl Bar and Cafe (featured on an episode of the Travel Channel's Burger Land in 2013), The Buckhorn Tavern (featured in 2009 on the Food Network's Throwdown! with Bobby Flay,) a seasonal roadside market, and a general store.

On July 15, 2018, San Antonio was hit by a thunderstorm that caused the small town to be covered with up to 2 ft of mud. This event received an emergency declaration from Governor Martinez. Highway 380 after this event was impossible to traverse, and the force of the flood water swept off the train tracks at the Burlington-Northern Santa Fe Railroad at the 380 crossing. This event helped justify funding for building a retention pond, and coming up with other plans to prevent similar future floods.

== Education ==
It is within Socorro Consolidated Schools. Socorro High School is the comprehensive high school of the district.

== See also ==
- List of census-designated places in New Mexico
