= Piro people (New Mexico) =

Historical pueblo in Rio Grande Valley

The Piro people /ˈpɪroʊ/ are a Native American people in New Mexico. Today, most of them live in Tortugas Pueblo or in the vicinity of Ysleta del Sur Pueblo in Texas.

The Piro tribe was a group of Pueblo peoples, who lived in New Mexico during the 16th and 17th centuries. The Piros (not to be confused with the Piros of the Ucayali basin in Peru) lived in a number of pueblos in the Rio Grande Valley around modern Socorro, New Mexico, United States. The now-extinct Piro language may have been a Tanoan language. Numbering several thousand at the time of first contact with the Spanish, by the time of the Pueblo Revolt in 1680, the Piro had been decimated by European-introduced diseases and Apache attacks, and most of the survivors resettled near El Paso, Texas.

== History ==
The Piro were closely related to the Tompiro, who lived to their northeast in the Salinas region of New Mexico. Linguists believe both groups likely spoke Tanoan languages. When the Spanish first encountered them in the 16th century, the Piro lived in the Rio Grande Valley for a distance around 60 miles (97 km) from north to south in present-day Socorro County. Beyond the narrow ribbon of green along the Rio Grande, the surrounding hinterlands are desert.

The Piro people, along with several other Pueblo peoples, were probably descendants of the Mogollon culture, the Ancestral Pueblo people, and the Casas Grandes peoples. These cultures flourished until about 1450 CE in a large area of the Southwestern United States and northwestern Mexico. The 15th-century Piro population was likely about 7000 people. The Piro's largest town, called San Pascual Pueblo by the Spanish, had 1,500 rooms and a population around 2,000 people.

Some Piros were hospitable to the first Spanish colonists, who arrived in 1598. As a result, the Spanish gave first one, then another, Piro pueblo the name Socorro, which means "aid" or "help" (in case of problems or difficulties). By the late 17th century, however, the Piros, like most other Pueblo groups, suffered increasingly from the strains of colonial rule. Several local rebellions broke out in the 1660s and 1670s, but the Spaniards always retained the upper hand. By the time of the Pueblo Revolt of 1680, the Piro communities had declined so much that the famous rebellion took place without them. Several hundred Piros (and Tiwas) accompanied the fleeing Spaniards south to El Paso del Norte (present-day Ciudad Juárez, Mexico); others scattered and joined other Pueblo groups. None of the Piro pueblos were ever resettled by the original inhabitants.

Today, the Piro people are part of the Piro/Manso/Tiwa Indian Tribe of the Pueblo of San Juan de Guadalupe in Las Cruces, New Mexico, as well as in Tortugas Pueblo.

Currently, a long-term archaeological project is active at the Piro pueblo of Tzelaqui/Sevilleta north of present-day Socorro.

== Piro pueblos ==
=== Historic ===
- Teypana
- Pilabó
- San Pascual Pueblo
- Senecú

=== Current ===
- Tortugas Pueblo

== See also ==
- Sevilleta National Wildlife Refuge
- Tompiro Indians
