= New Mexico State Road 547 =

State highway in Cibola County, New Mexico, United States

State Road 547
- NM 547 highlighted in red

Route information
- Maintained by NMDOT
- Length: 13.010 mi (20.938 km)

Major junctions
- Southern end: Historic US 66 / NM 122 in Grants
- Northern end: Forest Road 193 & Forest Road 293 in the Cibola National Forest

Location
- Country: United States
- State: New Mexico
- Counties: Cibola

Highway system
- New Mexico State Highway System; Interstate; US; State; Scenic
← NM 546	→ NM 549

State Road 547 (NM 547) is a 13.01-mile (20.94 km) state highway in Cibola County, New Mexico, United States, that connects Historic Route 66 / New Mexico State Road 122 (US 66 / NM 122) in Grants with Forest Road 193 (FH 193) and Forest Road 293 (FH 293) in the Cibola National Forest.

== Description ==
NM 547 begins at a split T intersection with US 66 / NM 122 (Santa Fe Avenue) in the city of Grants. (US 66 / NM 122 heads east toward Albuquerque and Tucumcari and heads west towards Milan, Thoreau, and Gallup. US 66 / NM 122 was formerly also designated as Interstate 40 Business, also known as Business Loop 32.)

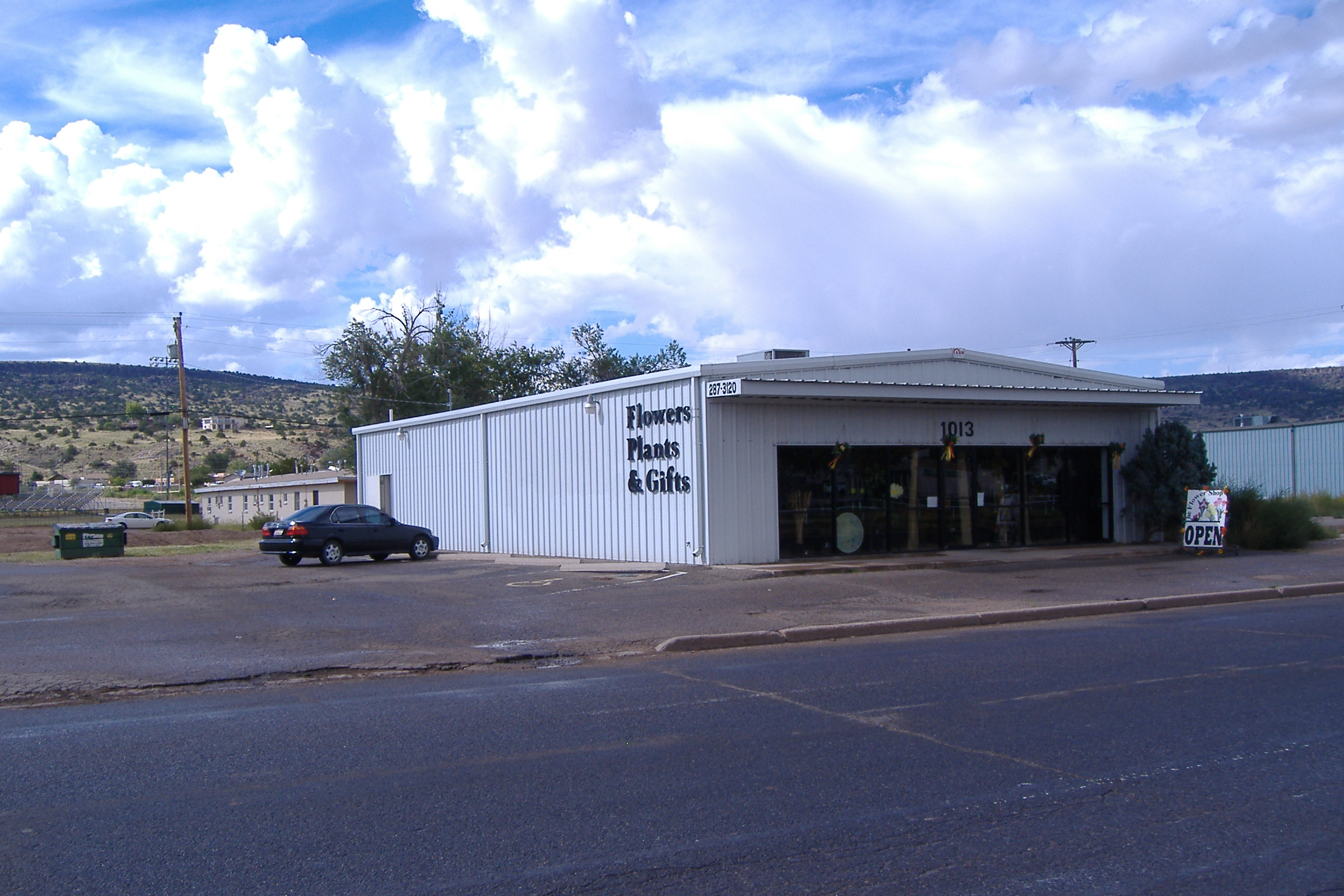
Flower shop along First Street in Grants, September 2012

From its southern terminus, northbound NM 547 proceeds north-northeast along First Street for about 12 blocks before reaching Roosevelt Avenue. At the intersection with Roosevelt Avenue northbound NM 547 connects with southbound NM 547. (First Street continues briefly north from the intersection.) Southbound NM 547 proceeds west from the intersection along West Roosevelt Avenue for one block before turning south-southwest along 2nd Street for 12 blocks, passing southeast of Grants High School, and ending at US 66 / NM 122. (West Roosevelt Avenue continues west from its T intersection with Second Street.)

From the intersection of First Street and Roosevelt Avenue, northbound and southbound NM 547 proceeds east along East Roosevelt Avenue for just under one-half mile (0.80 km) before turning north to run northeasterly along Lobo Canyon Road. (From that intersection East Roosevelt Avenue heads farther east and Mesa Boulevard heads southeast.)

Beyond the intersection of East Roosevelt Avenue, Mesa Boulevard, and Lobo Canyon Road, NM 547 proceeds northeasterly for just over two and a half miles (4.0 km) before leaving the city limits of Grants and passing along the north edge of the Western New Mexico Correctional Facility. NM 547 then enters the Cibola National Forest. NM 547 continues northeasterly for about 8.3 miles (13.4 km) before reaching its northern terminus at a T intersection with FH 193. (At that intersection NM 547 becomes FH 293, which continues east-northeasterly toward San Mateo, while FH 193 heads southeasterly.)

== Major intersections ==
The entire route is in Cibola County.

Location	mi	km	Destinations	Notes
Grants	0.000	0.000	Historic US 66 east / NM 122 east (Santa Fe Ave) – Albuquerque, Tucumcari Historic US 66 west / NM 122 west (Santa Fe Ave) – Milan, Thoreau, Gallup	Southern terminus; split T intersection; formerly I-40 BL
Cibola National Forest	13.010	20.938	Forest Road 193 (Horace Mesa Rd) east	Northern terminus
Cibola National Forest	13.010	20.938	Forest Road 239 (La Mosca Tank Rd) north – San Mateo	Continuation north from northern terminus
1.000 mi = 1.609 km; 1.000 km = 0.621 mi

== See also ==
- List of state roads in New Mexico
