= Paguate, New Mexico =

- Census-designated place
- Paguate watchtower, circa 1925

- Location of Paguate, New Mexico

- Location in the United States
- Coordinates: 35°08′43″N 107°22′35″W
- Country: United States
- State: New Mexico
- County: Cibola

Area
  - Total: 4.87 sq mi (12.62 km^{2})
  - Land: 4.87 sq mi (12.61 km^{2})
  - Water: 0.0039 sq mi (0.01 km^{2})
- Elevation: 6,217 ft (1,895 m)

Population (2020)
  - Total: 474
  - Density: 97.4/sq mi (37.59/km^{2})
- Time zone: UTC-7 (Mountain (MST))
  - Summer (DST): UTC-6 (MDT)
- ZIP code: 87040
- Area code: 505
- FIPS code: 35-54710
- GNIS feature ID: 2409015

Paguate is a census-designated place (CDP) in Cibola County, New Mexico, United States. As of the 2020 census, Paguate had a population of 474.

== Geography ==
Paguate is located in northeastern Cibola County within the lands of Laguna Pueblo. It is bordered to the west by Encinal and to the north by Bibo and Moquino. It is approximately 10 miles (16 km) north of the community of Laguna and Interstate 40.

According to the United States Census Bureau, the CDP has a total area of 19.2 square kilometres (7.4 sq mi), of which 0.02 square miles (0.04 km^{2}), or 0.20%, is water.

== Demographics ==
Historical population
Census	Pop.	Note	%±
2020	474		—
U.S. Decennial Census

As of the census of 2000, there were 474 people, 148 households, and 113 families residing in the CDP. The population density was 64.0 inhabitants per square mile (24.7/km^{2}). There were 183 housing units at an average density of 24.7 per square mile (9.5/km^{2}). The racial makeup of the CDP was 1.27% White, 97.68% Native American, and 1.05% from two or more races. Hispanic or Latino of any race were 1.48% of the population.

There were 148 households, out of which 34.5% had children under the age of 18 living with them, 39.2% were married couples living together, 33.8% had a female householder with no husband present, and 23.0% were non-families. 22.3% of all households were made up of individuals, and 8.1% had someone living alone who was 65 years of age or older. The average household size was 3.20 and the average family size was 3.74.

In the CDP, the population was spread out, with 29.7% under the age of 18, 10.5% from 18 to 24, 26.2% from 25 to 44, 20.7% from 45 to 64, and 12.9% who were 65 years of age or older. The median age was 34 years. For every 100 females, there were 80.2 males. For every 100 females age 18 and over, there were 78.1 males.

The median income for a household in the CDP was $22,417, and the median income for a family was $24,519. Males had a median income of $20,313 versus $16,563 for females. The per capita income for the CDP was $9,657. About 26.6% of families and 28.4% of the population were below the poverty line, including 33.6% of those under age 18 and 37.8% of those age 65 or over.

== Education ==
All public schools in the county are operated by Grants/Cibola County Schools.
