= Broadview =

Broadview can refer to:

== Places ==
=== Australia ===
- Broadview, South Australia

=== Canada ===
- Broadview (federal electoral district), in Ontario
- Broadview (TTC), a Toronto subway station
- Broadview Avenue, a street in Toronto
- Broadview, Saskatchewan

=== United States ===
- Broadview, Illinois
  - Broadview ICE Facility, US immigration detention center
- Broadview, Indiana
- Broadview, Montana
- Broadview, Cibola County, New Mexico
- Broadview, Curry County, New Mexico
- Broadview, Seattle, Washington
  - Broadview Creek in Seattle
- Broadview Heights, Ohio
- Broadview Park, Florida
- Broadview-Pompano Park, Florida

== Other uses ==
- Broadview (magazine), formerly the United Church Observer
- Broadview Press, Canadian academic publisher
- Broadview Security, formerly Brink's Home Security
