= El Morro Valley, New Mexico =

- Census-designated place
- Location within New Mexico Location within the United States
- Coordinates: 35°02′10″N 108°19′21″W
- Country: United States
- State: New Mexico
- County: Cibola

Area
  - Total: 9.93 sq mi (25.73 km^{2})
  - Land: 9.93 sq mi (25.73 km^{2})
  - Water: 0 sq mi (0.00 km^{2})
- Elevation: 7,471 ft (2,277 m)

Population (2020)
  - Total: 30
  - Density: 3.0/sq mi (1.17/km^{2})
- Time zone: UTC-7 (Mountain (MST))
  - Summer (DST): UTC-6 (MDT)
- ZIP Code: 87321 (Ramah)
- Area code: 505
- FIPS code: 35-23497
- GNIS feature ID: 2813404

El Morro Valley is a census-designated place (CDP) in Cibola County, New Mexico, United States. It includes El Morro National Monument and the unincorporated community of El Morro. The area was first listed as a CDP prior to the 2020 census. As of the 2020 census, El Morro Valley had a population of 30.

The CDP is in northwestern Cibola County along New Mexico State Road 53; it is 12 miles (19 km) southeast of Ramah and 40 miles (64 km) southwest of Interstate 40 at Grants. It is remotely located 38 miles (61 km) west-southwest of Grants along New Mexico State Road 53 (also known as the Ancient Way), and 55 miles (89 km) southeast of Gallup.

El Morro is named after a nearby sandstone promontory with a pool of water at its base, a desert oasis which the Spanish conquistadors called El Morro (The Headland). The Zuni people call it A'ts'ina (Place of Writings on the Rock). Anglo-Americans called it "Inscription Rock". El Morro National Monument is located 1.5 miles (2.4 km) west of the community on Highway 53, along the old Zuni-Acoma Trail, an ancient Pueblo trade route also known as the Ancient Way.

El Morro is an artist community and home of the El Morro Area Arts Council, an art gallery, a trading post, a coffee shop, cafe, RV park & campgrounds, feed & seed store, consignment store and healing arts centre. El Morro is the social hub for artists, homesteaders and individualists who reside in a 1000+ square mile area, from El Malpais National Monument to the east, Ramah to the west, the Zuni Mountains to the north, and Candy Kitchen to the south.

== Demographics ==
Historical population
Census	Pop.	Note	%±
2020	30		—
U.S. Decennial Census

== Climate ==
El Morro Valley's climate is affected by the North American monsoon, which comes during the summer months. The rest of the year is quite dry. Typical of high altitude locations in the American west, El Morro Valley experiences a wide average diurnal temperature variation, sometimes exceeding 30-40°F. The highest temperature ever recorded was 100° on June 28, 1953, and the coldest temperature ever recorded was -38° on January 13, 1963. The lowest maximum temperature ever recorded was 4° on February 3, 2011, while the highest minimum temperature ever recorded was 66° on August 10, 1995.

Climate data for El Morro National Monument, New Mexico (1991–2020 normals, extremes 1938–present)
Month	Jan	Feb	Mar	Apr	May	Jun	Jul	Aug	Sep	Oct	Nov	Dec	Year
Record high °F (°C)	68 (20)	72 (22)	77 (25)	87 (31)	93 (34)	100 (38)	98 (37)	98 (37)	94 (34)	87 (31)	78 (26)	69 (21)	100 (38)
Mean maximum °F (°C)	55 (13)	60 (16)	68 (20)	75 (24)	84 (29)	91 (33)	92 (33)	89 (32)	85 (29)	77 (25)	67 (19)	58 (14)	93 (34)
Mean daily maximum °F (°C)	43.5 (6.4)	47.2 (8.4)	55.4 (13.0)	63.4 (17.4)	72.1 (22.3)	83.2 (28.4)	84.5 (29.2)	81.6 (27.6)	76.6 (24.8)	66.1 (18.9)	53.2 (11.8)	44.3 (6.8)	64.3 (17.9)
Daily mean °F (°C)	28.8 (−1.8)	33.1 (0.6)	39.5 (4.2)	45.6 (7.6)	53.6 (12.0)	63.3 (17.4)	68.2 (20.1)	66.2 (19.0)	60.0 (15.6)	48.9 (9.4)	37.2 (2.9)	29.5 (−1.4)	47.8 (8.8)
Mean daily minimum °F (°C)	14.1 (−9.9)	19.1 (−7.2)	23.5 (−4.7)	27.8 (−2.3)	35.0 (1.7)	43.3 (6.3)	51.8 (11.0)	50.7 (10.4)	43.4 (6.3)	31.7 (−0.2)	21.4 (−5.9)	14.8 (−9.6)	31.2 (−0.4)
Mean minimum °F (°C)	−6 (−21)	2 (−17)	10 (−12)	16 (−9)	23 (−5)	33 (1)	43 (6)	42 (6)	30 (−1)	17 (−8)	2 (−17)	−6 (−21)	−12 (−24)
Record low °F (°C)	−38 (−39)	−23 (−31)	−15 (−26)	3 (−16)	12 (−11)	23 (−5)	34 (1)	33 (1)	21 (−6)	−5 (−21)	−23 (−31)	−31 (−35)	−38 (−39)
Average precipitation inches (mm)	1.02 (26)	0.85 (22)	0.98 (25)	0.69 (18)	0.70 (18)	0.51 (13)	2.21 (56)	2.68 (68)	1.41 (36)	1.02 (26)	0.89 (23)	0.94 (24)	14.24 (362)
Average snowfall inches (cm)	11.1 (28)	7.1 (18)	5.4 (14)	2.2 (5.6)	0.5 (1.3)	0 (0)	0 (0)	0 (0)	0 (0)	1.5 (3.8)	4.3 (11)	8.8 (22)	48.9 (124)
Average extreme snow depth inches (cm)	5 (13)	4 (10)	2 (5.1)	1 (2.5)	0 (0)	0 (0)	0 (0)	0 (0)	0 (0)	1 (2.5)	2 (5.1)	4 (10)	7 (18)
Average precipitation days (≥ 0.01 in)	6	6	5	4	4	4	13	13	8	6	5	6	80
Average snowy days (≥ 0.1 in)	5	4	3	2	0	0	0	0	0	1	2	5	26
Source: NOAA
