= Pinehill, New Mexico =

- Census-designated place
- Location of Pinehill in Cibola County

- Location in the United States
- Coordinates: 35°0′10″N 108°24′12″W
- Country: United States
- State: New Mexico
- County: Cibola

Area
  - Total: 3.53 sq mi (9.15 km^{2})
  - Land: 3.53 sq mi (9.15 km^{2})
  - Water: 0 sq mi (0.00 km^{2})
- Elevation: 7,120 ft (2,170 m)

Population (2020)
  - Total: 586
  - Density: 165.8/sq mi (64.01/km^{2})
- Time zone: UTC-7 (Mountain (MST))
  - Summer (DST): UTC-6 (MDT)
- ZIP code: 87357
- Area code: 505
- FIPS code: 35-57190
- GNIS feature ID: 1852631

Pinehill or Pine Hill is a census-designated place in Cibola County, New Mexico, United States. It is located on the Ramah Navajo Indian Reservation. The population was 88 at the 2010 census. The location of the CDP in 2010 had become the location of the Mountain View CDP as of the 2020 census, while a new CDP named "Pinehill" was listed 8 miles (13 km) further south, at a point 4 miles (6 km) southeast of Candy Kitchen.

== Geography ==
Pinehill is located in western Cibola County, 12 miles (19 km) south of New Mexico State Road 53 and 62 miles (100 km) southeast of Gallup. Grants, the Cibola County seat, is 58 miles (93 km) to the northeast. In 2010, the Pinehill CDP was 8 miles (13 km) to the north, encompassing the area known as Mountain View, the central location for many of the Ramah Navajo government offices.

According to the United States Census Bureau, in 2010 the CDP had a total area of 3.4 square miles (8.7 km^{2}), all land.

== Demographics ==
Historical population
Census	Pop.	Note	%±
2020	586		—
U.S. Decennial Census

As of the census of 2000, there were 116 people, 36 households, and 29 families residing in the CDP. The population density was 34.5 inhabitants per square mile (13.3/km^{2}). There were 47 housing units at an average density of 14.0 per square mile (5.4/km^{2}). The racial makeup of the CDP was 100.00% Native American.

There were 36 households, out of which 47.2% had children under the age of 18 living with them, 36.1% were married couples living together, 33.3% had a female householder with no husband present, and 19.4% were non-families. 16.7% of all households were made up of individuals, and 2.8% had someone living alone who was 65 years of age or older. The average household size was 3.22 and the average family size was 3.62.

In the CDP, the population was spread out, with 31.0% under the age of 18, 11.2% from 18 to 24, 26.7% from 25 to 44, 19.0% from 45 to 64, and 12.1% who were 65 years of age or older. The median age was 32 years. For every 100 females, there were 87.1 males. For every 100 females age 18 and over, there were 81.8 males.

The median income for a household in the CDP was $55,469, and the median income for a family was $25,469. Males had a median income of $0 versus $26,250 for females. The per capita income for the CDP was $11,983. There were 38.5% of families and 29.2% of the population living below the poverty line, including 39.1% of those under 18 and none of those over 64.

== Education ==
Pine Hill is the location of the Pine Hill Schools, a tribal school operated by the Ramah Navajo School Board.

Many children also attend the public schools in Ramah, New Mexico, including Ramah Elementary School and Ramah Middle/High School, operated by the Gallup-McKinley County Schools. The proximity of the nearest schools in Cibola County were so far, 50 miles (80 km) away, that Cibola and McKinley counties agreed to have students sent to McKinley County schools. The reservation is physically within Grants/Cibola County Schools; however few children attend them from Pine Hill, since there is no school bus service to these schools from Pine Hill.

=== History of education ===
Historically Native students in the reservation attended Bureau of Indian Affairs (BIA) boarding schools in New Mexico and other states. The BIA opened a Kindergarten through grade 3 day school, Mountain View Day School, on the reservation in 1943. It had an enrollment of 30 students at the start. A dormitory in Ramah Village, which had the nearest school district-operated public schools, opened in 1954, and Mountain View closed.

The Ramah Village public high school closed circa 1968, due to being condemned. At first secondary students were forced to attend distant BIA boarding schools as the dormitory in Ramah now only took elementary students, and the Gallup-McKinley school district did not bus to other public schools. The Navajo Legal System Program (DNA) sued the school district in August 1968 in an attempt to reopen the public school. The courts ruled that the reservation could have busing to the public schools in Zuni Pueblo, New Mexico (including Zuni High School), but the Gallup-McKinley County district chose to not allow its buses to enter Cibolo County, which contained the reservation. Therefore, the Ramah Navajo Indian School Board was established in 1970 and established a plan to open a tribal school, which it did in the ex-Ramah School in 1970; the tribal school moved to Pine Hill in 1975. In 1983 the Ramah Village public high school reopened.

In Summer 1994 the Ramah tribal government and the governments of Cibola County and McKinley County agreed to have two bus stops on the Ramah reservation, neither at Pinehill, but after parental outcry, a stop was established across from Pine Hill schools, and it began operation effective in December 1994. In January 1995 the Ramah Navajo chapter and the associated Ramah Navajo School Board, which operates Pine Hill Schools, sued the New Mexico Public Education Department and the Gallup McKinley County Schools arguing that the defendants breached the tribe's sovereignty by allowing the school district to extend school bus services further into the tribal grounds and therefore taking students who would have attended Pine Hill Schools and violating the previous agreement between the tribe and the counties.

== Post office ==
There is a post office in Pine Hill with the ZIP code 87357.

== Radio station ==
The studio of the KTDB radio station, which serves the Ramah Navajo Indian Reservation and surrounding areas is located in Pine Hill.

== Health clinic ==
Pinehill is the location of the Pine Hill Health Clinic.
