= Mountain View, Cibola County, New Mexico =

Mountain View, New Mexico
- Census-designated place
- Location within New Mexico Location within the United States
- Coordinates: 34°59′56″N 108°24′12″W
- Country: United States
- State: New Mexico
- County: Cibola

Area
  - Total: 2.07 sq mi (5.37 km^{2})
  - Land: 2.07 sq mi (5.37 km^{2})
  - Water: 0 sq mi (0.00 km^{2})
- Elevation: 7,126 ft (2,172 m)

Population (2020)
  - Total: 56
  - Density: 27.0/sq mi (10.43/km^{2})
- Time zone: UTC-7 (Mountain (MST))
  - Summer (DST): UTC-6 (MDT)
- ZIP Code: 87321 (Ramah)
- Area code: 505
- FIPS code: 35-50512
- GNIS feature ID: 2805104

Mountain View is a census-designated place (CDP) in Cibola County, New Mexico, United States. It is located on the Ramah Navajo Indian Reservation. In 2010 the location was listed as the Pinehill census-designated place. It was first listed as the Mountain View CDP prior to the 2020 census.

The CDP is in northwestern Cibola County, 4 miles (6 km) southwest of New Mexico State Road 53 and El Morro National Monument.

== Demographics ==
Historical population
Census	Pop.	Note	%±
2020	56		—
U.S. Decennial Census
