= Timberlake, New Mexico =

- Census-designated place
- Location within New Mexico Location within the United States
- Coordinates: 35°12′11″N 108°29′42″W
- Country: United States
- State: New Mexico
- Counties: Cibola; McKinley

Area
  - Total: 15.97 sq mi (41.4 km^{2})
  - Land: 15.97 sq mi (41.4 km^{2})
  - Water: 0.00 sq mi (0 km^{2})
- Elevation: 7,140 ft (2,180 m)

Population (2020)
  - Total: 121
  - Density: 10.3/sq mi (3.96/km^{2})
- Time zone: UTC-7 (Mountain (MST))
  - Summer (DST): UTC-6 (MDT)
- ZIP Code: 87321 (Ramah)
- Area code: 505
- FIPS code: 35-77930
- GNIS feature ID: 2806736

Timberlake is an unincorporated community and census-designated place (CDP) in McKinley and Cibola counties, New Mexico, United States. As of the 2020 census, it had a population of 121.

== Geography ==
The community is in a valley bordered by the Zuni Mountains to the northeast and The Hogback to the west, about 9 miles (14 km) north of Ramah. It is 54 miles (87 km) by road southeast of Gallup, the McKinley county seat, and 62 miles (100 km) west of Grants, the Cibola county seat.

According to the U.S. Census Bureau, the Timberlake CDP has an area of 16.0 square miles (41 km^{2}), all land. Cebolla Creek flows through the community, leading southwest to the Rio Pescado, part of the Zuni River watershed continuing west to the Little Colorado River in Arizona.

== Demographics ==
Historical population
Census	Pop.	Note	%±
2020	121		—
U.S. Decennial Census

Timberlake was first listed as a CDP prior to the 2020 census.

== Education ==
The portion in McKinley County is in Gallup-McKinley County Public Schools. It is zoned to Ramah Elementary School and Ramah Middle-High School.
