= New Mexico State Road 568 =

Highway in New Mexico

State Road 568
- NM 568 highlighted in red

Route information
- Maintained by NMDOT
- Length: 1.05 mi (1.69 km)

Major junctions
- South end: FR 180 near Milan
- North end: NM 122 near Milan

Location
- Country: United States
- State: New Mexico
- Counties: Cibola

Highway system
- New Mexico State Highway System; Interstate; US; State; Scenic
← NM 567	→ NM 569

State Road 568 (NM 568) is a 1.05-mile-long (1.69 km) state highway in the US state of New Mexico. NM 568's southern terminus is a continuation as Forest Service Road 180 at the end of state maintenance northwest of Milan, and the northern terminus is at NM 122 northwest of Milan.

== Major intersections ==
The entire route is in Cibola County.

Location	mi	km	Destinations	Notes
	0.000	0.000	NM 122	Northern terminus
	1.050	1.690	FR 180	Southern terminus; continues as FR 180 at the end of state maintenance
1.000 mi = 1.609 km; 1.000 km = 0.621 mi
