= El Rito, Cibola County, New Mexico =

El Rito, New Mexico
- Unincorporated community
- Location within New Mexico
- Coordinates: 34°59′57″N 107°18′00″W
- Country: United States
- State: New Mexico
- County: Cibola
- Elevation: 5,656 ft (1,724 m)
- Time zone: UTC-7 (Mountain (MST))
  - Summer (DST): UTC-6 (MDT)
- Area code: 505
- GNIS feature ID: 898769

El Rito is an unincorporated community in Cibola County, New Mexico, United States. El Rito is located approximately two miles southeast of Mesita on the Laguna Reservation. It is located on the north bank of the Rio San Jose and was named after the creek.
