= Pine Hill Schools (New Mexico) =

Indian Education (BIE)

Coordinates: 34.8917°N 108.4147°W

Pine Hill Schools is a K-12 tribal school system operated by the Ramah Navajo School Board, Inc. (RNSB), in association with the Bureau of Indian Education (BIE), in Pine Hill, New Mexico.

It is on the Ramah Navajo Reservation and was originally known as Ramah Navajo High School.

In January 1995 it had 460 Ramah Navajo students.

== History ==
The Ramah Navajo Indian School Board was established on February 6, 1970, by parents seeking a local schooling option as Gallup-McKinley County Schools had closed the local Ramah High School in Ramah in 1968, which forced Ramah Navajo teenagers to board at distant Bureau of Indian Affairs (BIA) boarding schools once again after having the option of local schooling since 1954. The members of the school board traveled to Washington, DC on February 25, 1970, to lobby members of Congress and the BIA. After BIA commissioner Louis Bruce promised assistance, the board members went to New York City and got funding from private foundations. On September 12, 1970, the school was dedicated in the former Ramah High School. The initial anticipated enrollment was 150. Ed Foreman, a member of Congress for New Mexico's 2nd congressional district, assisted the school board in its efforts to lobby the federal government and attended the school's dedication. President of the United States Richard Nixon sent a telegram congratulating the school community.

By 1970 the school was not yet accredited. New Mexico law requires that schools be accredited in order to operate. That year staff of five universities and colleges stated that they would still admit graduates of Ramah Navajo High, and that the lack of accreditation was not an issue. In December 1970 the State Superintendent of Public Instruction, Leonard J. De Layo, made a request for a quick deliberation of accrediting Ramah Navajo High. At one point the administration stated that it did not want to dilute its program for certification from New Mexico, and that if so it would try to get tribal accreditation instead.

In 1970 about 33% of the students in the area around Ramah Navajo High were from other Native tribes and/or non-Native Americans, and parents from those groups expressed that they had issues with not having political control over Ramah Navajo High. They sent a letter to the New Mexico Superintendent of Public Instruction highlighting seven issues.

The lease at the ex-Ramah High location ended in 1975, so the school moved to Pine Hill before electricity, telephone, and water services there started. Students voted in the current name of the school. The dedication was held on September 26, 1975.

The establishment of a tribally-run school was inspiration for the Indian Self-Determination and Education Assistance Act, which allowed tribes to take over schools from the BIA.

In January 1995 the Ramah Navajo chapter and the associated Ramah Navajo School Board sued the New Mexico Public Education Department and the Gallup McKinley County Schools, arguing that the defendants breached the tribe's sovereignty by allowing the school district to extend school bus services further into the tribal grounds and therefore taking students who would have attended Pine Hill schools and violating a previous agreement between the tribe and the school boards of Cibola County and McKinley County. The state had ordered the school district to move the bus stops closer to the students' houses.

Circa 2012 a new elementary school building was under construction, but the contractor withdrew from the project, and in 2014 the building was not yet complete. The BIA had paid $2,100,000 to have the facility built as of 2014. In 2014 the campus had failures in infrastructure, including a non-working fire alarm system. Additionally, the Pine Hill community did not have a working fire department even though the BIA had built a fire station in the years prior.

== Governance ==
The current board members are: Martha H. Garcia (President); Beverly J. Cohoe (Vice-President); and Carolyn Coho (Secretary/Treasurer) for Calendar Year 2022. The board members for Calendar Year 2021 were: Maxine Coho (President); Beverly J. Cohoe (Vice-President) and Marlene Watashe (Secretary/Treasurer). RNSB, Inc. celebrated 52 years of operation on February 6, 2022.

== Campus ==
The kindergarten opened in 1976, and the middle school opened in 1989.

The school system has a dormitory, which opened in 2007; 66 units of employee housing, which opened in 1995; and a childcare center, which opened in 1993 and had a new modular unit in 2007. There is also a multipurpose building which opened in 1989.

== Programs ==
In 1972 there were plans to establish a school magazine, Tsa' az' zi (meaning "yucca" in Navajo language), which would cover Navajo culture.

== See also ==
- Ramah Navajo School Board, Inc. v. Bureau of Revenue of New Mexico
