= Skyline-Ganipa, New Mexico =

- Census-designated place
- Location of Skyline-Ganipa in Cibola County

- Location within the state of New Mexico
- Coordinates: 35°02′18″N 107°37′26″W
- Country: United States
- State: New Mexico
- County: Cibola

Area
  - Total: 7.81 sq mi (20.22 km^{2})
  - Land: 7.81 sq mi (20.22 km^{2})
  - Water: 0 sq mi (0.00 km^{2})
- Elevation: 6,195 ft (1,888 m)

Population (2020)
  - Total: 1,614
  - Density: 206.8/sq mi (79.83/km^{2})
- Time zone: UTC-7 (Mountain (MST))
  - Summer (DST): UTC-6 (MDT)
- Area code: 505
- FIPS code: 35-73440
- GNIS feature ID: 2408745

Skyline-Ganipa is a census-designated place (CDP) in Cibola County, New Mexico, United States. As of the 2020 census, Skyline-Ganipa had a population of 1,614.

== Geography ==
Skyline-Ganipa is located in northern Cibola County within the lands of Acoma Pueblo. It occupies elevated land south of the valley of the Rio San Jose. By road, it is approximately 5 miles (8 km) south of Interstate 40; Grants, the county seat, is 17 miles (27 km) to the northwest.

According to the United States Census Bureau, the CDP has a total area of 6.1 square miles (15.9 km^{2}), all land.

== Demographics ==
Historical population
Census	Pop.	Note	%±
2020	1,614		—
U.S. Decennial Census

As of the census of 2000, there were 1,035 people, 220 households, and 196 families residing in the CDP. The population density was 168.1 inhabitants per square mile (64.9/km^{2}). There were 242 housing units at an average density of 39.3 per square mile (15.2/km^{2}). The racial makeup of the CDP was 0.77% White, 98.55% Native American, 0.10% from other races, and 0.58% from two or more races. Hispanic or Latino of any race were 1.16% of the population.

There were 220 households, out of which 45.0% had children under the age of 18 living with them, 46.4% were married couples living together, 34.1% had a female householder with no husband present, and 10.9% were non-families. 6.4% of all households were made up of individuals, and 0.5% had someone living alone who was 65 years of age or older. The average household size was 4.70 and the average family size was 4.89.

In the CDP, the population was spread out, with 37.8% under the age of 18, 14.0% from 18 to 24, 25.9% from 25 to 44, 16.1% from 45 to 64, and 6.2% who were 65 years of age or older. The median age was 24 years. For every 100 females, there were 86.8 males. For every 100 females age 18 and over, there were 78.9 males.

The median income for a household in the CDP was $26,190, and the median income for a family was $27,188. Males had a median income of $20,625 versus $19,732 for females. The per capita income for the CDP was $7,553. About 29.2% of families and 32.6% of the population were below the poverty line, including 31.8% of those under age 18 and 29.0% of those age 65 or over.

== Education ==
All public schools in the county are operated by Grants/Cibola County Schools.

== See also ==
- Acoma Pueblo
- Acoma Indian Reservation
