= Lobo Canyon, New Mexico =

- Census-designated place
- Location within New Mexico Location within the United States
- Coordinates: 35°13′37″N 107°44′12″W
- Country: United States
- State: New Mexico
- County: Cibola

Area
  - Total: 4.30 sq mi (11.14 km^{2})
  - Land: 4.30 sq mi (11.14 km^{2})
  - Water: 0 sq mi (0.00 km^{2})
- Elevation: 7,349 ft (2,240 m)

Population (2020)
  - Total: 146
  - Density: 34.0/sq mi (13.11/km^{2})
- Time zone: UTC-7 (Mountain (MST))
  - Summer (DST): UTC-6 (MDT)
- ZIP Code: 87020 (Grants)
- Area code: 505
- FIPS code: 35-41953
- GNIS feature ID: 2806693

Lobo Canyon is a census-designated place (CDP) in Cibola County, New Mexico, United States. As of the 2020 census, Lobo Canyon had a population of 146. It was first listed as a CDP prior to the 2020 census.

The CDP is in northern Cibola County, 9 miles (14 km) northeast of Grants, the county seat. It is along New Mexico State Road 547 in a valley called Lobo Canyon, at the base of La Jara Mesa.

== Demographics ==
Historical population
Census	Pop.	Note	%±
2020	146		—
U.S. Decennial Census
