= Broadview, New Mexico =

There are two places named Broadview in the U.S. state of New Mexico:

- Broadview, Cibola County, New Mexico, a census-designated place
- Broadview, Curry County, New Mexico, an unincorporated community
