= Golden Acres (disambiguation) =

Golden Acres commonly refers to Golden Acres, Pasadena, Texas, in the United States.

Golden Acres may also refer to:

- Golden Acres, Alberta, a locality in Parkland County, Alberta, Canada
- Golden Acres, Fort Wayne, a neighborhood in Fort Wayne, Indiana, United States
- Golden Acres, New Mexico, a census-designated place in the United States

== See also ==
- Golden Acre (disambiguation)
