= Moquino, New Mexico =

- Census-designated place
- Location within New Mexico
- Coordinates: 35°10′16″N 107°22′12″W
- Country: United States
- State: New Mexico
- County: Cibola

Area
  - Total: 0.70 sq mi (1.81 km^{2})
  - Land: 0.70 sq mi (1.81 km^{2})
  - Water: 0 sq mi (0.00 km^{2})
- Elevation: 6,103 ft (1,860 m)

Population (2020)
  - Total: 31
  - Density: 44/sq mi (17.1/km^{2})
- Time zone: UTC-7 (Mountain (MST))
  - Summer (DST): UTC-6 (MDT)
- Area code: 505
- FIPS code: 35-50020
- GNIS feature ID: 2584156

Moquino is a census-designated place (CDP) in Cibola County, New Mexico, United States. As of the 2020 census, Moquino had a population of 31.

== Geography ==
Moquino is located in northeastern Cibola County and is bordered to the west by Bibo and to the northwest by Seboyeta. Interstate 40 in Laguna is 14 miles (23 km) to the south.

According to the United States Census Bureau, the Moquino CDP has a total area of 2.3 square miles (6.0 km^{2}), all land.

== Demographics ==
Historical population
| Census | Pop. | Note | %± |
|---|---|---|---|
| 2020 | 31 | | — |
U.S. Decennial Census

== Education ==
All public schools in the county are operated by Grants/Cibola County Schools.
