= Cibola County, New Mexico =

County in New Mexico, United States

- County
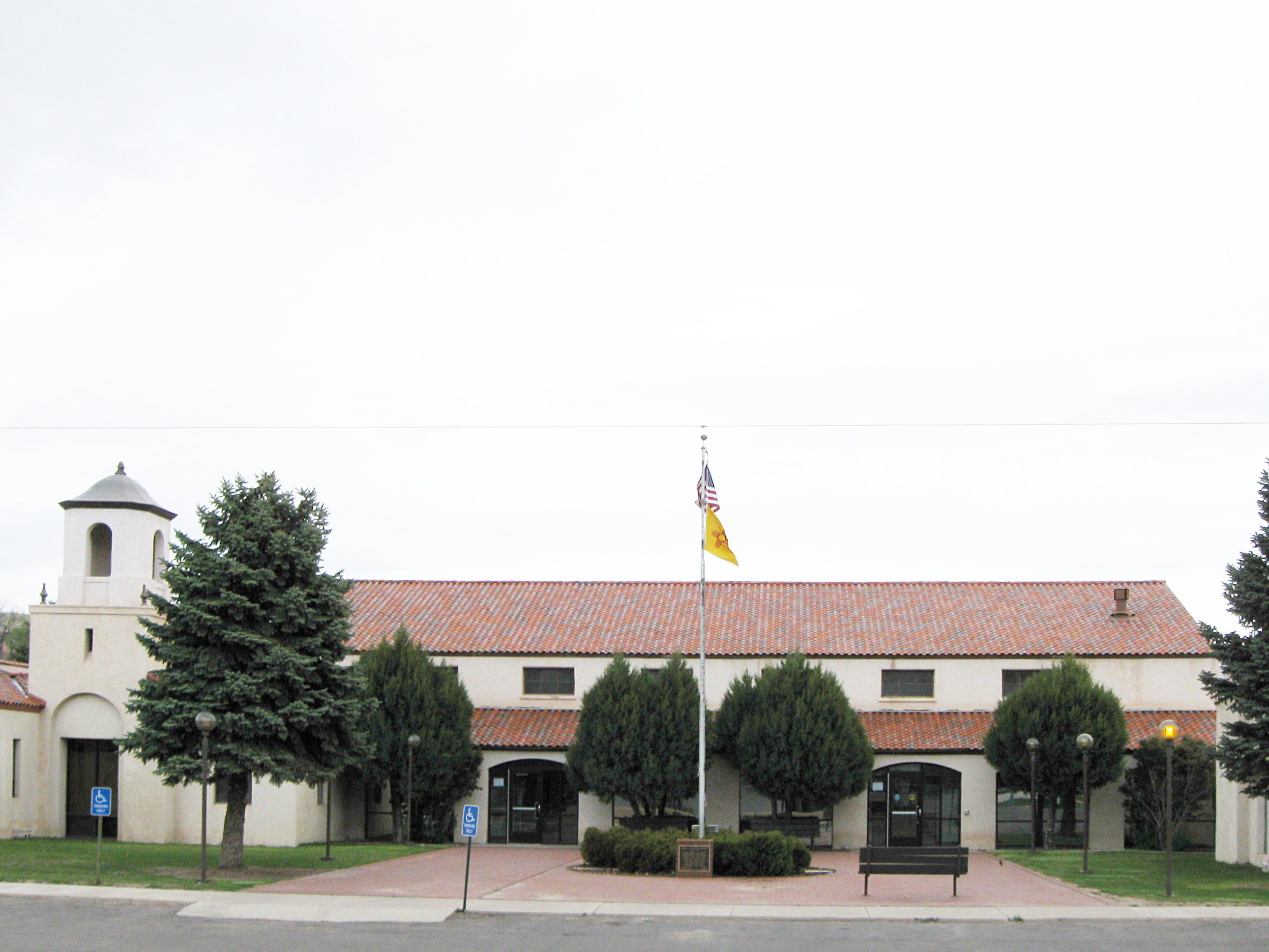
- Cibola County Courthouse in Grants

- Location within the U.S. state of New Mexico
- Coordinates: 34°55′N 107°59′W
- Country: United States
- State: New Mexico
- Founded: June 19, 1981
- Named for: Mythical Seven Cities of Cibola
- Seat: Grants
- Largest city: Grants

Area
  - Total: 4,542 sq mi (11,760 km^{2})
  - Land: 4,539 sq mi (11,760 km^{2})
  - Water: 2.3 sq mi (6.0 km^{2}) 0.05%

Population (2020)
  - Total: 27,172
  - Estimate (2025): 26,807 ▼
  - Density: 6/sq mi (2.3/km^{2})
- Time zone: UTC−7 (Mountain)
  - Summer (DST): UTC−6 (MDT)
- Congressional district: 2nd
- Website: www.cibolacountynm.com

Cibola County is a county in the U.S. state of New Mexico. As of the 2020 census, the population was 27,172. Its county seat is Grants. It is New Mexico's youngest county, and the third youngest county in the United States, created on June 19, 1981, from the westernmost four-fifths of the formerly much larger Valencia County.

Cibola County comprises the Grants, New Mexico Micropolitan Statistical Area. The county is a rich mining area with numerous Uranium mines.

== Geography ==
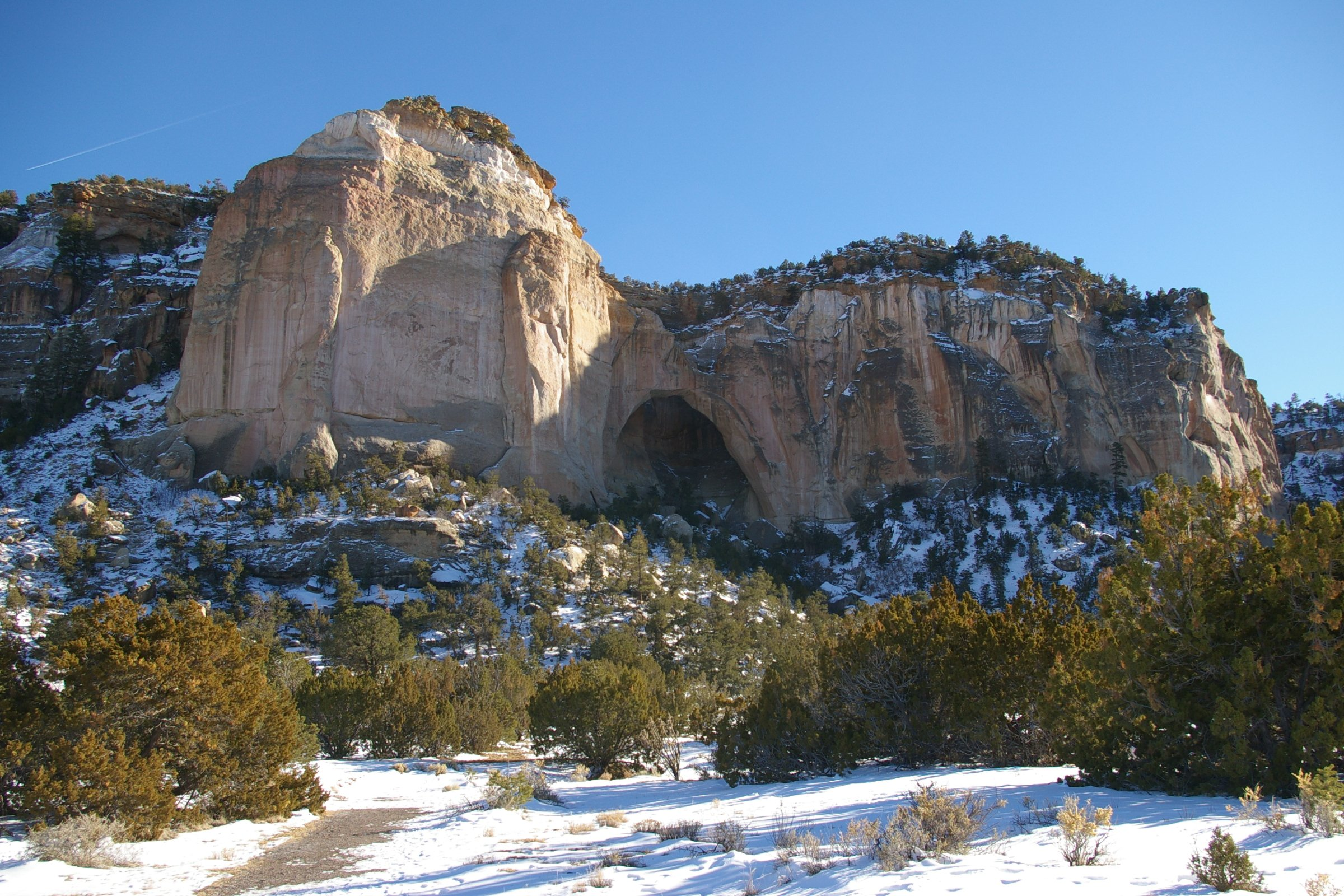
Ventana Arch in El Malpais National Monument

According to the U.S. Census Bureau, the county has an area of 4,542 square miles (11,760 km^{2}), of which 4,539 square miles (11,760 km^{2}) is land and 2.3 square miles (6.0 km^{2}) (0.05%) is water.

=== Adjacent counties ===
- McKinley County - north
- Sandoval County - northeast
- Bernalillo County - east
- Valencia County - east
- Socorro County - southeast
- Catron County - south
- Apache County, Arizona - west

=== National protected areas ===
- Cibola National Forest (part)
- El Malpais National Conservation Area
- El Malpais National Monument
- El Morro National Monument

== Demographics ==
Historical population
Census	Pop.	Note	%±
1990	23,794		—
2000	25,595		7.6%
2010	27,213		6.3%
2020	27,172		−0.2%
2025 (est.)	26,807	▼	−1.3%
U.S. Decennial Census; 1790-1960 1900-1990; 1990-2000 2010

=== Racial and ethnic composition ===
Cibola County, New Mexico – Racial composition
Race (NH = Non-Hispanic)	2020	2010	2000	1990
White alone (NH)	20.4% (5,538)	21.5% (5,857)	24.7% (6,325)	27.3% (6,491)
Black alone (NH)	0.9% (254)	0.8% (221)	0.9% (231)	0.8% (179)
American Indian alone (NH)	43.3% (11,767)	39.2% (10,680)	39% (9,993)	37.6% (8,945)
Asian alone (NH)	0.7% (201)	0.5% (136)	0.4% (91)	0.3% (62)
Pacific Islander alone (NH)	0% (7)	0.1% (19)	0% (7)	
Other race alone (NH)	0.7% (196)	0.1% (21)	0.2% (47)	0% (8)
Multiracial (NH)	2.1% (565)	1.3% (345)	1.4% (346)	—
Hispanic/Latino (any race)	31.8% (8,644)	36.5% (9,934)	33.4% (8,555)	34.1% (8,109)

=== 2020 census ===
As of the 2020 census, the county had a population of 27,172, and the median age was 38.5 years. 23.6% of residents were under the age of 18 and 17.3% were 65 years of age or older. For every 100 females there were 97.8 males, and for every 100 females age 18 and over there were 96.2 males age 18 and over.

The racial makeup of the county was 29.7% White, 1.0% Black or African American, 45.0% American Indian and Alaska Native, 0.8% Asian, 0.1% Native Hawaiian and Pacific Islander, 10.5% from some other race, and 12.8% from two or more races. Hispanic or Latino residents of any race comprised 31.8% of the population.

36.7% of residents lived in urban areas, while 63.3% lived in rural areas.

There were 9,080 households in the county, of which 33.5% had children under the age of 18 living with them and 32.2% had a female householder with no spouse or partner present. About 27.3% of all households were made up of individuals and 12.5% had someone living alone who was 65 years of age or older.

There were 11,099 housing units, of which 18.2% were vacant. Among occupied housing units, 74.4% were owner-occupied and 25.6% were renter-occupied. The homeowner vacancy rate was 1.4% and the rental vacancy rate was 11.5%.

The most reported ancestries in 2020 were:

- Navajo (14.9%)
- Mexican (14.5%)
- Pueblo of Laguna (13.2%)
- Pueblo of Acoma (11.6%)
- Spanish (6.8%)
- English (6.4%)
- German (4.2%)
- Irish (4.2%)
- Scottish (1.1%)

=== 2010 census ===
As of the 2010 census, there were 27,213 people, 8,860 households, and 6,274 families living in the county. The population density was 6.0 inhabitants per square mile (2.3 inhabitants/km^{2}). There were 11,101 housing units at an average density of 2.4 units per square mile (0.93 units/km^{2}). The racial makeup of the county was 41.8% white, 41.0% American Indian, 1.0% black or African American, 0.5% Asian, 0.1% Pacific islander, 12.4% from other races, and 3.1% from two or more races. Those of Hispanic or Latino origin made up 36.5% of the population. In terms of ancestry, 5.4% were Irish, and 1.5% were American.

Of the 8,860 households, 38.0% had children under the age of 18 living with them, 41.1% were married couples living together, 20.8% had a female householder with no husband present, 29.2% were non-families, and 24.9% of all households were made up of individuals. The average household size was 2.79 and the average family size was 3.30. The median age was 36.6 years.

The median income for a household in the county was $37,361 and the median income for a family was $41,187. Males had a median income of $36,027 versus $25,318 for females. The per capita income for the county was $14,712. About 20.1% of families and 24.0% of the population were below the poverty line, including 32.7% of those under age 18 and 14.3% of those age 65 or over.

=== 2000 census ===
As of the 2000 census, there were 25,595 people, 8,327 households, and 6,278 families living in the county. The population density was 6 people per square mile (2.3 people/km^{2}). There were 10,328 housing units at an average density of 2 units per square mile (0.77/km^{2}). The racial makeup of the county was 39.61% White, 0.96% Black or African American, 40.32% Native American, 0.38% Asian, 0.05% Pacific Islander, 15.44% from other races, and 3.24% from two or more races. 33.42% of the population were Hispanic or Latino of any race.

There were 8,327 households, out of which 38.00% had children under the age of 18 living with them, 50.60% were married couples living together, 18.30% had a female householder with no husband present, and 24.60% were non-families. 21.10% of all households were made up of individuals, and 7.30% had someone living alone who was 65 years of age or older. The average household size was 2.95 and the average family size was 3.41.

In the county, the population was spread out, with 30.70% under the age of 18, 9.60% from 18 to 24, 27.50% from 25 to 44, 21.50% from 45 to 64, and 10.70% who were 65 years of age or older. The median age was 33 years. For every 100 females there were 95.50 males. For every 100 females age 18 and over, there were 92.20 males.

The median income for a household in the county was $27,774, and the median income for a family was $30,714. Males had a median income of $27,652 versus $20,078 for females. The per capita income for the county was $11,731. About 21.50% of families and 24.80% of the population were below the poverty line, including 32.00% of those under age 18 and 17.70% of those age 65 or over.

== Education ==
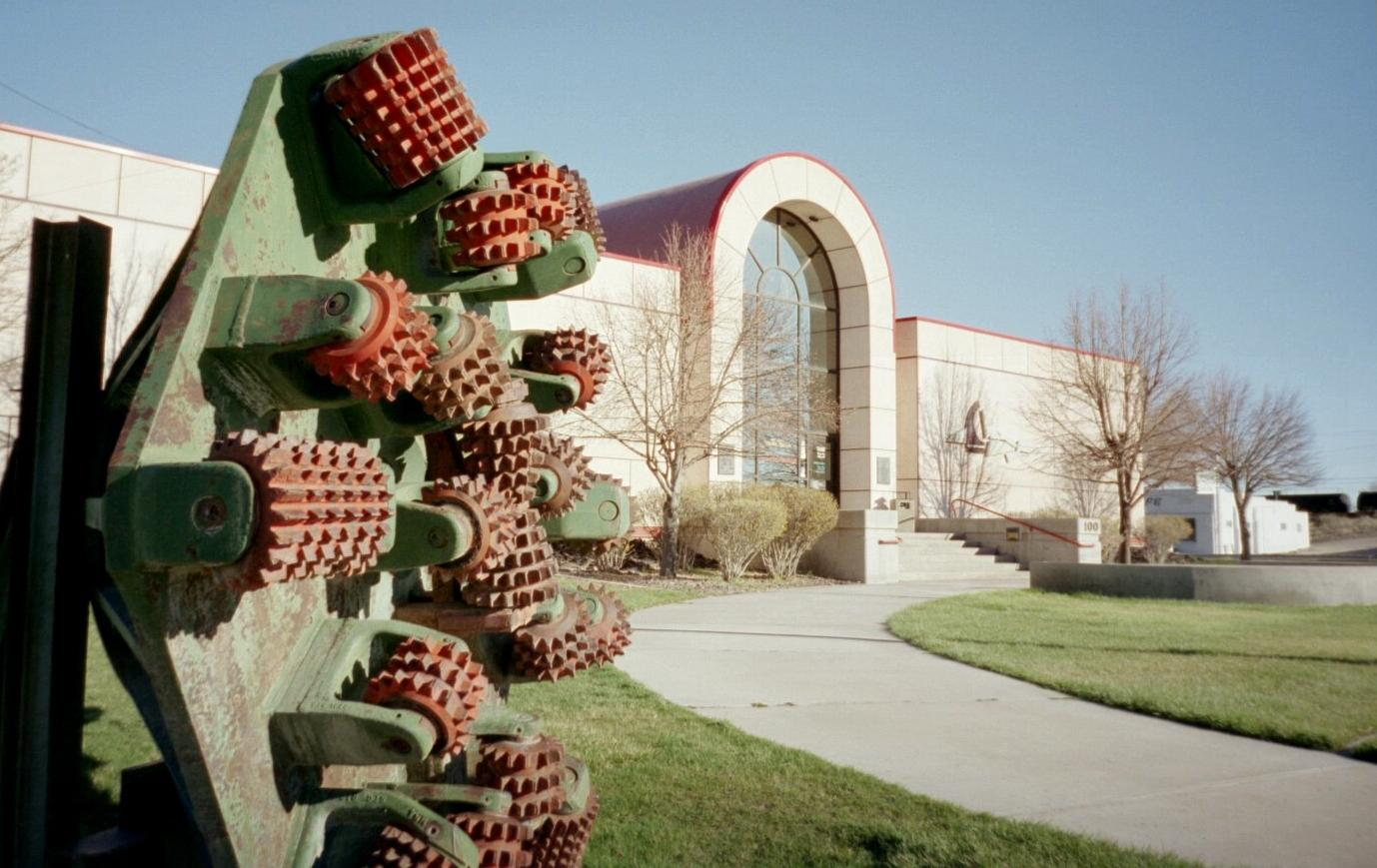
The Mining Museum in Grants

School districts serving portions of the county include:

- Grants-Cibola County Schools
- Quemado Independent Schools
- Zuni Public Schools

All public schools in the county are operated by Grants/Cibola County Schools; the Quemado and Zuni facilities are in other counties.

Due to an agreement between Cibola County and McKinley County, residents of the Ramah Navajo Indian Reservation are bussed to schools in Ramah in McKinley County (including Ramah Middle/High School) even though they are physically in Cibola County, due to the long distance to the nearest Cibola County schools from the reservation.

== Corrections ==
Cibola County is home to three prisons:

- the Cibola County Correctional Center, operated by Corrections Corporation of America, housing 1129 federal inmates under a contract with the Federal Bureau of Prisons and the United States Marshal Service
- the New Mexico Women's Correctional Facility, run by CCA for the state of New Mexico, and
- Western New Mexico Correctional Facility, owned and operated by the state, with about 440 male inmates

In November 2018, following a private autopsy, a unit of the Cibola County Correctional Center (CCCC) was named in the abuse and wrongful death on May 25, 2018, of Roxsana Hernández Rodríguez. Rodríguez was a 33-year-old transgender woman who immigrated from Honduras. The CCCC is operated under contract by CoreCivic.

== Politics ==
United States presidential election results for Cibola County, New Mexico
Year	Republican		Democratic		Third party(ies)	
Year	No.	%	No.	%	No.	%
1984	3,578	53.09%	3,140	46.59%	22	0.33%
1988	2,640	43.02%	3,458	56.35%	39	0.64%
1992	2,051	32.64%	3,334	53.06%	899	14.31%
1996	2,245	32.63%	4,030	58.58%	605	8.79%
2000	2,752	38.83%	4,127	58.23%	209	2.95%
2004	3,477	46.44%	3,913	52.26%	97	1.30%
2008	3,131	34.42%	5,827	64.05%	139	1.53%
2012	2,998	36.37%	4,961	60.18%	284	3.45%
2016	3,195	39.63%	3,741	46.40%	1,127	13.98%
2020	3,975	44.65%	4,745	53.30%	183	2.06%
2024	4,311	48.02%	4,450	49.57%	216	2.41%

Cibola County tends to support the Democratic Party. In the 1984 presidential election, a majority voted for the Republican presidential nominee, otherwise since that time (except 2016 and 2024) all other presidential elections had a Democrat majority. Democratic strength lies especially in the Acoma, Laguna, and Ramah Navajo Reservations. Republican strength lies in Milan, Grants, and surrounding rural areas, as well as the southwestern portion of the county.

In the 2024 election, the county saw a strong trend toward the Republican Party. Kamala Harris was unable to gain a majority in the county, only winning through a narrow plurality of 49.57%. This was due in part to the cities of Grants and Milan, which trended more Republican than in 2020, with every precinct giving Trump the majority (unlike in 2020, when much of central Grants voted majority Democratic). With the exception of the rural areas to the northeast and the northwest of Grants, the rest of the county also saw Republican trends, including the areas with highly Native American populations. This was the closest that any Republican presidential candidate has come to flipping the county since Reagan's time.

At the state level, the only time it has voted for a Republican nominee for Governor was 2014, when Susana Martinez carried all but five counties in her reelection bid.

== Communities ==
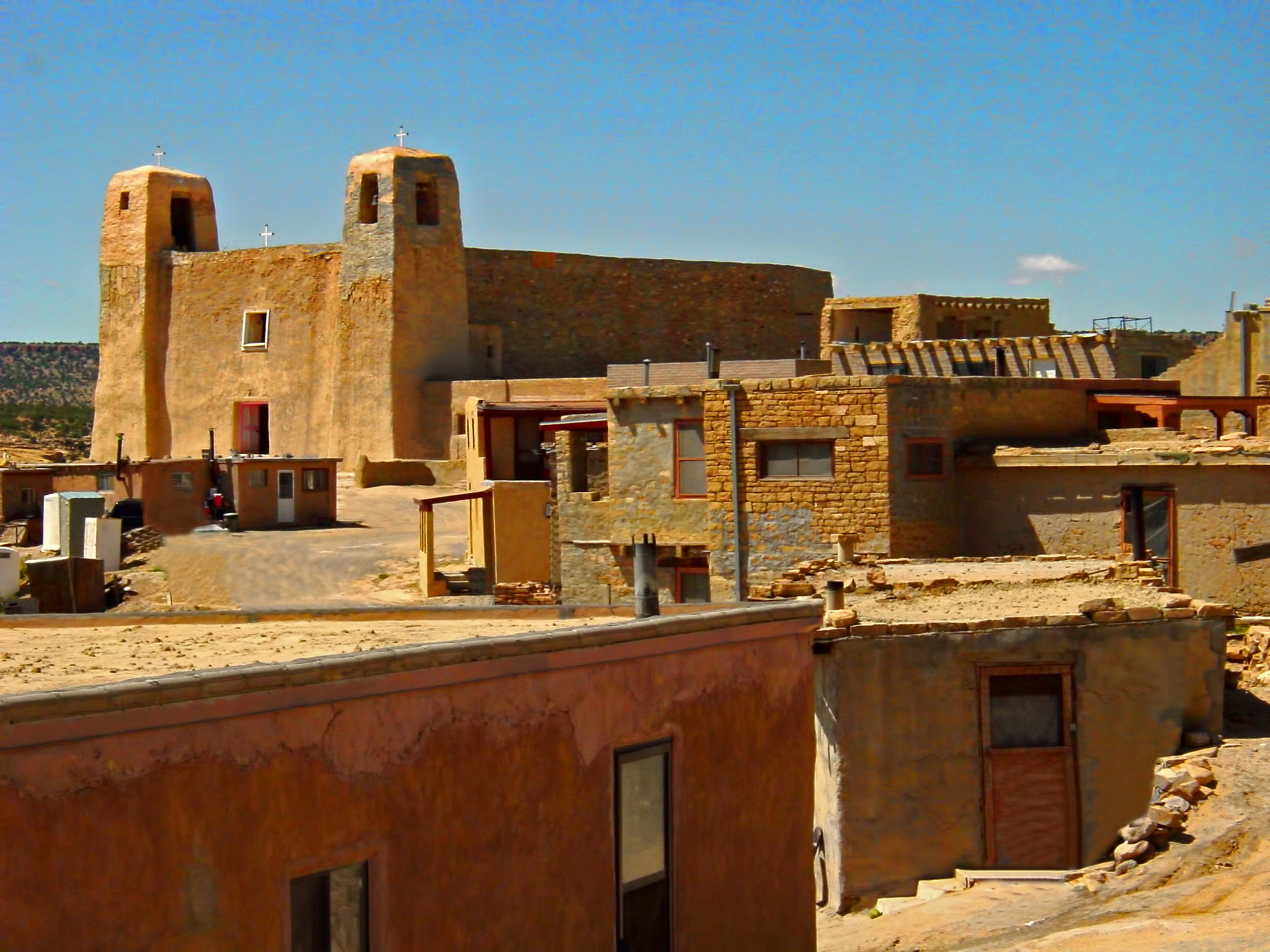
Acoma Pueblo, "Sky City", 2008

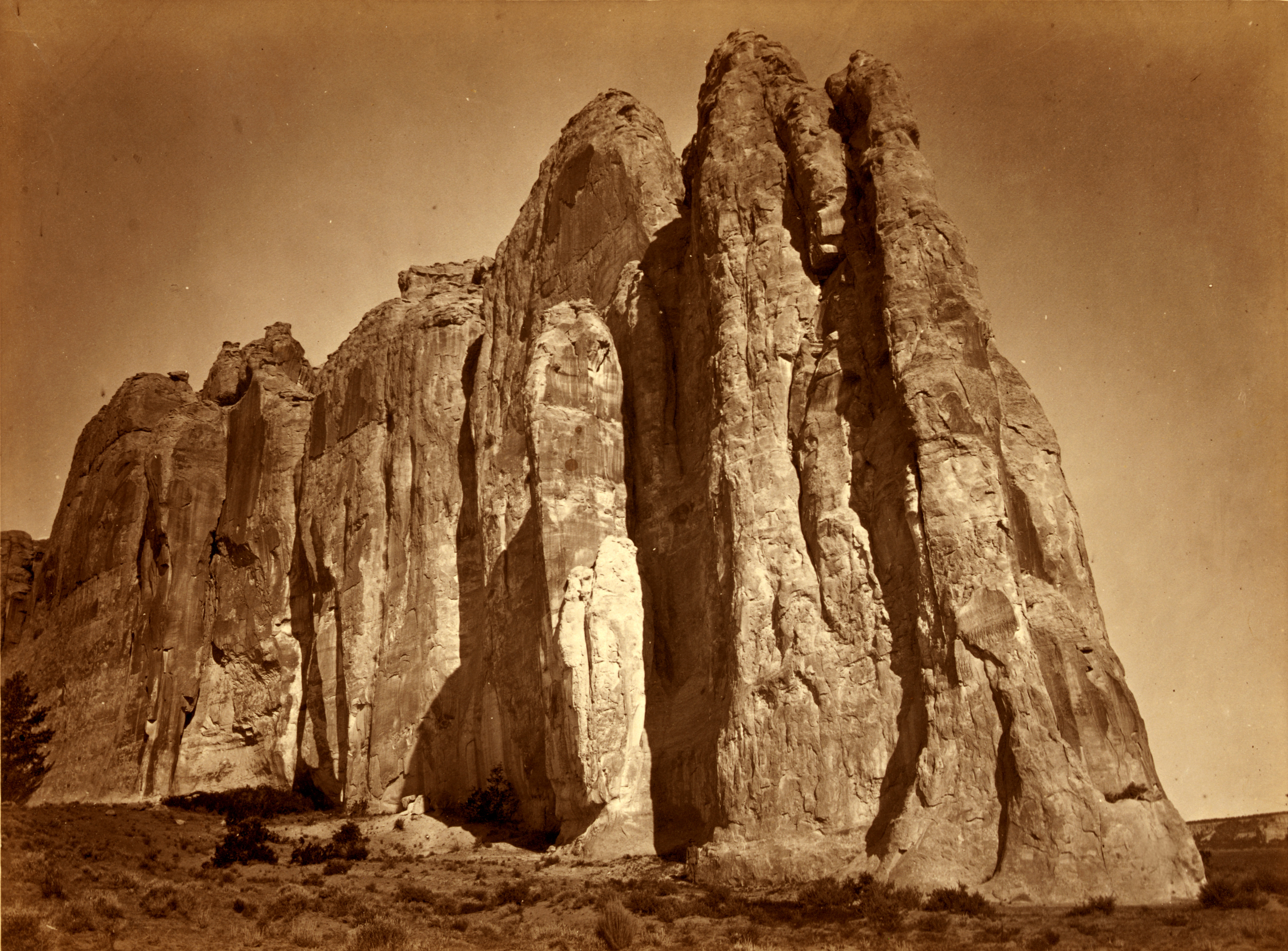
South side of Inscription Rock, El Morro National Monument. Photo by Timothy H. O'Sullivan, 1873.

=== City ===
- Grants (county seat)

=== Village ===
- Milan

=== Census-designated places ===
There are 32 Census Designated Places contained within the county, largely designated in 1980.

- Acomita Lake
- Anzac Village
- Bibo
- Bluewater Village
- Broadview
- Candy Kitchen
- Cubero
- El Morro Valley
- Encinal
- Fence Lake
- Golden Acres
- Laguna
- Las Tusas
- Lobo Canyon
- McCartys Village
- Mesita
- Moquino
- Mount Taylor
- Mountain View
- North Acomita Village
- Paguate
- Paraje
- Pinehill
- San Fidel
- San Mateo
- San Rafael
- Seama
- Seboyeta
- Skyline-Ganipa
- South Acomita Village
- Stoneridge
- Timberlake (part)

=== Unincorporated communities ===
- Alaska
- Casa Blanca
- Cebolleta
- Cebolletita
- Cubero
- El Rito
- Fence Lake
- New Laguna

=== Ghost Town ===
- Anaconda

== Transportation ==
=== Major highways ===
- I-40
  - I-40 BL (Grants)
- NM 6
- NM 36
- NM 53
- NM 117
- NM 122
- NM 124
- NM 279
- NM 547
- NM 568
- NM 605

== See also ==
- National Register of Historic Places listings in Cibola County, New Mexico
