= Wild Spirit Wolf Sanctuary =

- Interactive map of Wild Spirit Wolf Sanctuary
- 34.910653°N 108.489201°W
- Date opened: 1991
- Location: Candy Kitchen, New Mexico, United States
- No. of animals: 60+
- Annual visitors: 15,000+
- Website: wildspiritwolfsanctuary.org

Wild Spirit Wolf Sanctuary (WSWS) is an animal sanctuary in Candy Kitchen, New Mexico, United States, dedicated to rescuing and providing sanctuary for captive-bred wolves, wolfdogs, and other canids. It is a 501(c)(3) non-profit organization and the largest canid sanctuary in all of North America.

Across the road from the sanctuary is a campground also run by the WSWS, where both guided and self-guided tours are available.

== History ==
Originally called the Candy Kitchen Rescue Ranch, WSWS was founded in 1991 by Jacque Evans. Evans, a wolfdog owner herself, realized that few people could handle such high-maintenance pets. She decided to create a refuge for unwanted wolves and wolfdogs on her property in Candy Kitchen. She supported animal rescues and the ranch by selling her artwork.

In 1993, Barbara Berge, who was rescuing wolfdogs in Albuquerque, moved to Candy Kitchen and helped Jacque transform the rescue ranch into a non-profit organization.

In 2003, Candy Kitchen Rescue Ranch was reorganized into the Wild Spirit Wolf Sanctuary, and Leyton Cougar became executive director.

In August, 2020, Brittany McDonald became Executive Director of Wild Spirit Wolf Sanctuary, replacing out-going Director of Operations, Crystal Castellanos.

== Impact ==
Wild Spirit Wolf Sanctuary operates with an “Animals Come First” attitude.

Wild Spirit teaches the public about the humane treatment of wild animals, about the relationships between people and other life through respectful, compassionate co-existence, and about humanity’s important role as having the choice to be a part of the change needed to see ecosystems heal and thrive.

Care is customized to each animal’s needs, desires, personality, and health. Wild Spirit understands that some animals will never want human attention, and we respect that wish by ensuring socialization is never forced.

Wild Spirit Wolf Sanctuary does not breed, sell, or exploit their rescues. All educational programs are offered on-site and are hands-off to reduce stress on the animals.

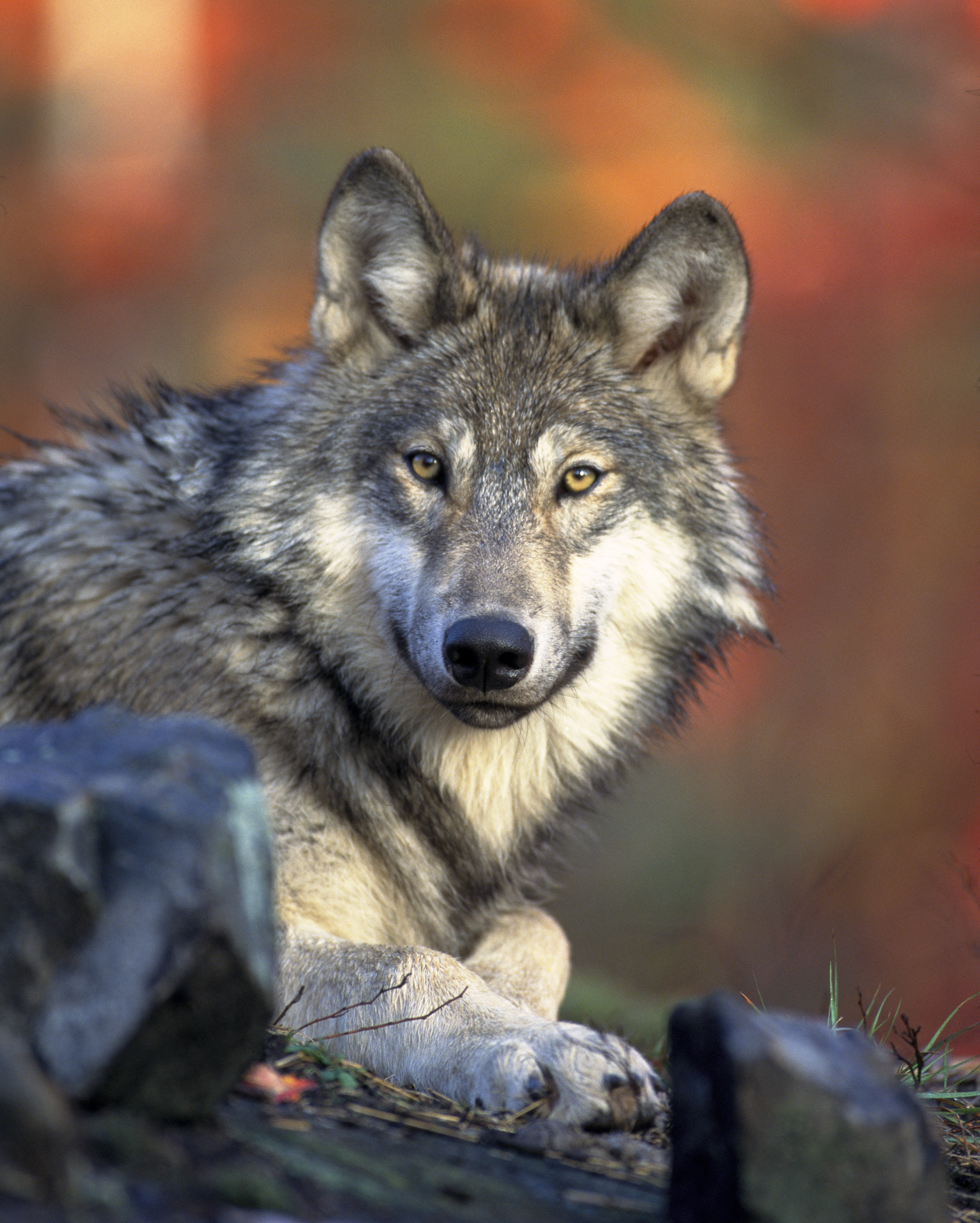
wolf
