= Ramah Middle/High School =

Public school in New Mexico, United States

Coordinates: 35.1221°N 108.4969°W

Ramah Middle/High School is a public secondary school in unincorporated McKinley County, New Mexico, near the Ramah census-designated place and with a Ramah postal address. It is a part of Gallup-McKinley County Schools.

== Service area ==
In addition to Ramah, the school serves the McKinley County portion of Timberlake.

The Gallup-McKinley district takes students from the Ramah Navajo Indian Reservation, including Pinehill, which is in Cibola County, by sending secondary students to Ramah Middle/High. The proximity of the nearest schools in Cibola County were so far, 50 miles (80 km) away, that Cibola and McKinley counties agreed to have students on the reservation sent to McKinley County schools. The reservation is physically within the Grants/Cibola County Schools district.

== History ==
In the 20th century area residents gathered $15,000 and volunteered their time so this school could be built. According to Edgar Bond, from Ramah, who served as a school board member, 28,000 hours were spent by residents to build the school. This was done as the Bureau of Indian Affairs (BIA) had plans to build a dormitory for area Native Americans. Ramah area residents donated another parcel of land to the BIA, where the dormitory was built. In 1952 Ramah Navajo Native Americans were to vote on whether to send their children to the Ramah dormitory. After the Ramah Navajo approved the dormitory idea, the proposal was that the U.S. federal government would pay the New Mexico authorities for any Native American children attending New Mexican public schools. In 1954 this dormitory opened, which allowed the majority of residents of the Ramah Navajo Reservation to attend public schools close to their residences.

In 1967 Ramah High had 136 students and seven employees. In 1968 the school had 58 students in grades 9-12 and 61 students in grades 7-8. In 1968 150 students lived in the BIA dormitory. In 1968, 12 secondary school aged Native Americans from the area went to Albuquerque Indian School instead of attending Ramah High, while 18 Native Americans from the area stayed in BIA dormitories in Albuquerque and attended Albuquerque Public Schools facilities. In 1967 W. B. FitzSimmons, the Gallup-McKinley superintendent, asked the BIA to expand the dormitory so 240 additional students could stay there. Bond stated that the BIA stated it would expand the dormitory but then did not do so.

In March 1968 the New Mexico State School board officially disapproved of Ramah High School, which means the school is asked to improve its performance for the following year or else it would have its money from the state cut off. State officials stated that the building was in a worse condition compared to other Gallup-McKinley schools. Additionally they criicized how female students had no vocational classes available, and how the school did not staff its library with an appropriate certified employee.

By 1968, there was a lawsuit filed by DNA, Inc. against the school board, which alleged that the school district did not properly notify people the school would close, and that by sending area Native American students to Zuni High School, it would put them in a more heavily Native American environment and count as a form of discrimination. In October of that year, Frank B. Zia, the district court judge, dismissed the lawsuit and asked Gallup-McKinley school district administrators to research new bus routes.

The Ramah High building became condemned in 1968. That year the district closed Ramah High, arguing that the enrollment was not high enough. By December 1968 the school board was considering how to sell or give away the school site.

The closure of the high school meant the dormitories became elementary only, and so Ramah Navajo people once again had to board at faraway BIA boarding schools. After legal battles and advocacy, the Ramah Navajo opened the Ramah Navajo High School in the former Ramah High School, now leased. The lease at that location ended in 1975, so the school moved to Pine Hill and became Pine Hill Schools. In 1983 Ramah High reopened.

In 1995 the combined enrollment of this school and the elementary school in Ramah was fewer than 400. In 1999 the secondary school's enrollment count was 125.

== Athletics ==
As of 1999 the regular audience for the basketball games for male players was 700-800 per game.
