= Homestead, New Mexico =

- Census-designated place
- Location within New Mexico
- Coordinates: 34°08′57″N 107°52′40″W
- Country: United States
- State: New Mexico
- County: Catron

Area
  - Total: 1.17 sq mi (3.04 km^{2})
  - Land: 1.17 sq mi (3.03 km^{2})
  - Water: 0 sq mi (0.00 km^{2})
- Elevation: 7,664 ft (2,336 m)

Population (2020)
  - Total: 74
  - Density: 63/sq mi (24.4/km^{2})
- Time zone: UTC-7 (Mountain (MST))
  - Summer (DST): UTC-6 (MDT)
- Area code: 575
- GNIS feature ID: 2584113

Homestead is a census-designated place in Catron County, New Mexico, United States. As of the 2020 census, Homestead had a population of 74.

== Geography ==
According to the U.S. Census Bureau, the community has an area of 1.172 square miles (3.04 km^{2}); 1.171 square miles (3.03 km^{2}) is land and 0.001 square miles (0.0026 km^{2}) is water.

== Demographics ==
Historical population
Census	Pop.	Note	%±
2020	74		—
U.S. Decennial Census

== Education ==
The school district is Quemado Schools.
