= Broadview, Cibola County, New Mexico =

Broadview, New Mexico
- Census-designated place
- Location within New Mexico Location within the United States
- Coordinates: 35°13′28″N 107°52′17″W
- Country: United States
- State: New Mexico
- County: Cibola

Area
  - Total: 3.75 sq mi (9.72 km^{2})
  - Land: 3.75 sq mi (9.72 km^{2})
  - Water: 0 sq mi (0.00 km^{2})
- Elevation: 6,559 ft (1,999 m)

Population (2020)
  - Total: 339
  - Density: 90.3/sq mi (34.86/km^{2})
- Time zone: UTC-7 (Mountain (MST))
  - Summer (DST): UTC-6 (MDT)
- ZIP Code: 87021 (Milan); 87020 (Grants)
- Area code: 505
- FIPS code: 35-09202
- GNIS feature ID: 2806688

Broadview is a census-designated place (CDP) in Cibola County, New Mexico, United States. It was first listed as a CDP prior to the 2020 census.

The CDP is in northern Cibola County on the north side of Milan. New Mexico State Road 605 passes through the community, leading southwest 4 miles (6 km) to Interstate 40 in Milan, and northeast 18 miles (29 km) to San Mateo.

== Demographics ==
Historical population
Census	Pop.	Note	%±
2020	339		—
U.S. Decennial Census
