= Golden Acres, New Mexico =

- Census-designated place
- Location within New Mexico Location within the United States
- Coordinates: 35°12′40″N 107°55′06″W
- Country: United States
- State: New Mexico
- County: Cibola

Area
  - Total: 0.92 sq mi (2.37 km^{2})
  - Land: 0.92 sq mi (2.37 km^{2})
  - Water: 0 sq mi (0.00 km^{2})
- Elevation: 6,550 ft (2,000 m)

Population (2020)
  - Total: 144
  - Density: 157.1/sq mi (60.66/km^{2})
- Time zone: UTC-7 (Mountain (MST))
  - Summer (DST): UTC-6 (MDT)
- ZIP Code: 87020 (Grants)
- Area code: 505
- FIPS code: 35-30035
- GNIS feature ID: 2806691

Golden Acres is a census-designated place (CDP) in Cibola County, New Mexico, United States. It was first listed as a CDP prior to the 2020 census. As of the 2020 census, Golden Acres had a population of 144.

== Geography ==
The CDP is in northern Cibola County, northwest of Milan. It is bordered to the east by the Milan town limits and to the west by Interstate 40. New Mexico State Road 122, following the historic route of U.S. Route 66, runs through the eastern side of the community, through the site of the former community of Toltec. Grants is 6 miles (10 km) to the southeast, and Gallup is 55 miles (89 km) to the northwest.

== Demographics ==
Historical population
Census	Pop.	Note	%±
2020	144		—
U.S. Decennial Census
