= Mount Taylor, New Mexico =

- Census-designated place
- Location within New Mexico Location within the United States
- Coordinates: 35°07′33″N 107°48′27″W
- Country: United States
- State: New Mexico
- County: Cibola

Area
  - Total: 1.91 sq mi (4.94 km^{2})
  - Land: 1.91 sq mi (4.94 km^{2})
  - Water: 0 sq mi (0.00 km^{2})
- Elevation: 6,421 ft (1,957 m)

Population (2020)
  - Total: 436
  - Density: 228.6/sq mi (88.25/km^{2})
- Time zone: UTC-7 (Mountain (MST))
  - Summer (DST): UTC-6 (MDT)
- ZIP Code: 87020 (Grants)
- Area code: 505
- FIPS code: 35-50615
- GNIS feature ID: 2806694

Mount Taylor is a census-designated place (CDP) in Cibola County, New Mexico, United States. It was first listed as a CDP prior to the 2020 census.

As of the 2020 census, Mount Taylor had a population of 436.

The community is in northern Cibola County and is bordered to the north and west by Grants, the county seat, and to the south by the Rio San Jose and a tributary. New Mexico State Road 117, the local name of Historic Route 66, passes through the community. Mount Taylor, at 11,301 feet (3,445 m) the highest peak in Cibola County, is 14 miles (23 km) to the northeast.

== Demographics ==
Historical population
Census	Pop.	Note	%±
2020	436		—
U.S. Decennial Census
