= Mesita, New Mexico =

- Census-designated place
- Location of Mesita, New Mexico

- Location in the United States
- Coordinates: 35°00′02″N 107°18′34″W
- Country: United States
- State: New Mexico
- County: Cibola

Area
  - Total: 7.49 sq mi (19.39 km^{2})
  - Land: 7.47 sq mi (19.35 km^{2})
  - Water: 0.015 sq mi (0.04 km^{2})
- Elevation: 5,630 ft (1,720 m)

Population (2020)
  - Total: 793
  - Density: 106.1/sq mi (40.98/km^{2})
- Time zone: UTC-7 (Mountain (MST))
  - Summer (DST): UTC-6 (MDT)
- ZIP code: 87026
- Area code: 505
- FIPS code: 35-48200
- GNIS feature ID: 2408822

Mesita is a census-designated place (CDP) in Cibola County, New Mexico, United States. As of the 2020 census, Mesita had a population of 793.

== Geography ==
Mesita is located in eastern Cibola County and is bordered to the northwest by Laguna. Interstate 40 passes through the community, with access from Exit 117. I-40 leads west 35 miles (56 km) to Grants, the Cibola County seat, and east 44 miles (71 km) to Albuquerque. The Rio San Jose, a tributary of the Rio Puerco, runs along the northeast side of the community.

According to the United States Census Bureau, the Mesita CDP has a total area of 10.7 square miles (27.7 km^{2}), of which 0.02 square miles (0.04 km^{2}), or 0.13%, is water.

== Demographics ==
Historical population
Census	Pop.	Note	%±
2020	793		—
U.S. Decennial Census

As of the census of 2000, there were 776 people, 214 households, and 188 families residing in the CDP. The population density was 72.5 inhabitants per square mile (28.0/km^{2}). There were 228 housing units at an average density of 21.3 per square mile (8.2/km^{2}). The racial makeup of the CDP was 1.03% White, 97.42% Native American, 0.77% from other races, and 0.77% from two or more races. Hispanic or Latino of any race were 2.96% of the population.

There were 214 households, out of which 46.3% had children under the age of 18 living with them, 51.4% were married couples living together, 29.0% had a female householder with no husband present, and 12.1% were non-families. 10.3% of all households were made up of individuals, and 3.3% had someone living alone who was 65 years of age or older. The average household size was 3.63 and the average family size was 3.88.

In the CDP, the population was spread out, with 36.0% under the age of 18, 10.1% from 18 to 24, 29.0% from 25 to 44, 19.1% from 45 to 64, and 5.9% who were 65 years of age or older. The median age was 28 years. For every 100 females, there were 90.7 males. For every 100 females age 18 and over, there were 86.8 males.

The median income for a household in the CDP was $24,444, and the median income for a family was $27,083. Males had a median income of $26,184 versus $21,364 for females. The per capita income for the CDP was $10,104. About 23.2% of families and 26.9% of the population were below the poverty line, including 37.1% of those under age 18 and 22.5% of those age 65 or over.

== Education ==
All public schools in the county are operated by Grants/Cibola County Schools.

== See also ==
- List of census-designated places in New Mexico
