= Anzac Village, New Mexico =

- Census-designated place
- Location within New Mexico
- Coordinates: 35°03′56″N 107°44′42″W
- Country: United States
- State: New Mexico
- County: Cibola

Area
  - Total: 0.98 sq mi (2.53 km^{2})
  - Land: 0.98 sq mi (2.53 km^{2})
  - Water: 0 sq mi (0.00 km^{2})
- Elevation: 6,303 ft (1,921 m)

Population (2020)
  - Total: 67
  - Density: 68.7/sq mi (26.52/km^{2})
- Time zone: UTC-7 (Mountain (MST))
  - Summer (DST): UTC-6 (MDT)
- Area code: 505
- FIPS code: 35-03970
- GNIS feature ID: 2585647

Anzac Village is a census-designated place (CDP) in Cibola County, New Mexico, United States. As of the 2020 census, Anzac Village had a population of 67.

== Geography ==
Anzac Village is located in northern Cibola County, in the northwest corner of the Acoma Indian Reservation. It is bordered on the north by Anzac Road in the valley of the Rio San Jose; the road connects with Historic U.S. Route 66 to the east and west.

The book place names of New Mexico states that the "town" is small, a railroad siding. The Atchison, Topeka and Santa Fe Railway railroad bestowed the name on this site during WWI in honor of Australia's, and New Zealand's contribution to the war effort.

According to the United States Census Bureau, the CDP has a total area of 0.56 square miles (1.44 km^{2}), all land.

== Demographics ==
Historical population
Census	Pop.	Note	%±
2020	67		—
U.S. Decennial Census
