= Escudilla Bonita, New Mexico =

- Census-designated place
- Location within New Mexico
- Coordinates: 34°06′44″N 109°01′23″W
- Country: United States
- State: New Mexico
- County: Catron

Area
  - Total: 12.19 sq mi (31.58 km^{2})
  - Land: 12.16 sq mi (31.49 km^{2})
  - Water: 0.035 sq mi (0.09 km^{2})
- Elevation: 7,317 ft (2,230 m)

Population (2020)
  - Total: 92
  - Density: 7.6/sq mi (2.92/km^{2})
- Time zone: UTC-7 (Mountain (MST))
  - Summer (DST): UTC-6 (MDT)
- Area code: 575
- GNIS feature ID: 2584097

Escudilla Bonita is a census-designated place in Catron County, New Mexico, United States. As of the 2020 census, Escudilla Bonita had a population of 92.

== Geography ==
According to the U.S. Census Bureau, the community has an area of 12.194 square miles (31.58 km^{2}); 12.159 square miles (31.49 km^{2}) is land and 0.035 square miles (0.091 km^{2}) is water.

== Demographics ==
Historical population
Census	Pop.	Note	%±
2020	92		—
U.S. Decennial Census

== Education ==
The school district is Quemado Schools.
