= Quemado Independent Schools =

School district in Quemado, New Mexico, U.S.

Quemado Independent Schools (Independent School District 2) is a school district headquartered in Quemado, New Mexico, U.S. Shelby Perea of the Albuquerque Journal described the district, located in a rural area, as being "small".

In Catron County the district includes Quemado, Datil, Escudilla Bonita, Homestead, Pie Town, and some areas held by the Zuni Reservation. Additionally the district serves a portion of Cibola County, including Fence Lake.

== History ==
Joe McDee was superintendent until 1965, when Herman D. Harm of Marsing, Idaho replaced him.

In 2019 superintendent David Lackey stated that the district was unable to use New Mexico's school safety funding due to the conditions involved in the funding.

== Schools ==
It has two schools: a K-12 school called Quemado Elementary and High School, and an elementary school called Datil Elementary School. The latter is a two-room schoolhouse with multi-level classes.
