= Golden Acre =

Golden Acre may mean:

- Golden Acre (Cape Town), a large shopping centre
- Golden Acre Park in Yorkshire, England

== See also ==
- Goldenacre, area of Edinburgh, Scotland
- Golden Acres (disambiguation)
