= Broadview-Pompano Park =

Broadview-Pompano Park, Florida
- neighborhood
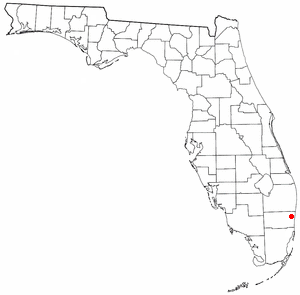
- Location of Broadview-Pompano Park, Florida
- Coordinates: 26°12′15″N 80°12′44″W
- Country: United States
- State: Florida
- County: Broward

Area
  - Total: 0.58 sq mi (1.5 km^{2})
  - Land: 0.58 sq mi (1.5 km^{2})
  - Water: 0 sq mi (0.0 km^{2})

Population (2000)
  - Total: 5,314
  - Density: 8,948/sq mi (3,454.8/km^{2})
- Time zone: UTC-5 (Eastern (EST))
  - Summer (DST): UTC-4 (EDT)
- FIPS code: 12-08662

Broadview-Pompano Park is a neighborhood and former census-designated place (CDP) in North Lauderdale, Broward County, Florida, United States. The population was 5,314 at the 2000 census.

== Geography ==
Broadview-Pompano Park is located at 26°12′15″N 80°12′44″W (26.204061, -80.212168).

According to the United States Census Bureau, the CDP has a total area of 1.5 km^{2} (0.58 sq mi), all land.

== Demographics ==
As of the census of 2000, there were 5,314 people, 1,558 households, and 1,240 families residing in the CDP. The population density was 3,477.5 people/km^{2} (9,007 people/mi^{2}). There were 1,635 housing units at an average density of 1,070.0 units/km^{2} (2,771 units/mi^{2}). The racial makeup of the CDP was 62.38% White (38.2% were Non-Hispanic White,) 18.93% African American, 0.26% Native American, 3.27% Asian, 9.37% from other races, and 5.78% from two or more races. Hispanic or Latino of any race were 36.62% of the population.

There were 1,558 households, out of which 48.7% had children under the age of 18 living with them, 54.3% were married couples living together, 16.7% had a female householder with no husband present, and 20.4% were non-families. 14.8% of all households were made up of individuals, and 3.6% had someone living alone who was 65 years of age or older. The average household size was 3.41 and the average family size was 3.70.

In the CDP, the population was spread out, with 32.4% under the age of 18, 9.7% from 18 to 24, 33.2% from 25 to 44, 18.7% from 45 to 64, and 5.9% who were 65 years of age or older. The median age was 30 years. For every 100 females, there were 104.1 males. For every 100 females age 18 and over, there were 104.6 males.

The median income for a household in the CDP was $34,867, and the median income for a family was $33,413. Males had a median income of $24,335 versus $24,153 for females. The per capita income for the CDP was $12,252. About 11.9% of families and 15.5% of the population were below the poverty line, including 21.6% of those under age 18 and 3.3% of those age 65 or over.

As of 2000, English as a first language accounted for 56.76% of residents, while Spanish made up 34.98%, and French Creole was the mother tongue of 8.25% of the population.
