= Fence Lake, New Mexico =

- Census-designated place
- In front of the old school building

- Location within New Mexico
- Coordinates: 34°39′12″N 108°40′26″W
- Country: United States
- State: New Mexico
- County: Cibola

Area
  - Total: 3.00 sq mi (7.77 km^{2})
  - Land: 3.00 sq mi (7.77 km^{2})
  - Water: 0 sq mi (0.00 km^{2})
- Elevation: 7,051 ft (2,149 m)

Population (2020)
  - Total: 17
  - Density: 5.7/sq mi (2.19/km^{2})
- Time zone: UTC-7 (Mountain (MST))
  - Summer (DST): UTC-6 (MDT)
- ZIP code: 87315
- Area code: 505
- FIPS code: 35-26010
- GNIS feature ID: 2584100

Fence Lake is a census-designated place located in southwestern Cibola County, New Mexico, United States. Designated in 1980 by the United States Census Bureau, Fence Lake had a population of 17 as of the 2020 census.

== Geography ==
Fence Lake is located along New Mexico State Road 36, 33 miles (53 km) south of NM 53. It is 63 miles (101 km) south of Gallup and 40 miles (64 km) northwest of Quemado.

=== Climate ===
Climate data for Fence Lake, New Mexico (1991–2020)
Month	Jan	Feb	Mar	Apr	May	Jun	Jul	Aug	Sep	Oct	Nov	Dec	Year
Mean daily maximum °F (°C)	46.0 (7.8)	50.5 (10.3)	58.1 (14.5)	66.2 (19.0)	75.8 (24.3)	84.9 (29.4)	86.3 (30.2)	83.2 (28.4)	78.9 (26.1)	67.9 (19.9)	55.5 (13.1)	46.2 (7.9)	66.6 (19.2)
Daily mean °F (°C)	30.9 (−0.6)	35.1 (1.7)	41.2 (5.1)	47.0 (8.3)	55.3 (12.9)	64.4 (18.0)	69.1 (20.6)	67.1 (19.5)	61.4 (16.3)	50.0 (10.0)	38.4 (3.6)	30.8 (−0.7)	49.2 (9.6)
Mean daily minimum °F (°C)	15.8 (−9.0)	19.7 (−6.8)	24.3 (−4.3)	27.8 (−2.3)	34.8 (1.6)	43.8 (6.6)	51.9 (11.1)	50.9 (10.5)	44.0 (6.7)	32.2 (0.1)	21.3 (−5.9)	15.5 (−9.2)	31.8 (−0.1)
Average precipitation inches (mm)	0.87 (22)	0.71 (18)	0.75 (19)	0.45 (11)	0.43 (11)	0.45 (11)	2.12 (54)	2.44 (62)	1.73 (44)	1.09 (28)	0.79 (20)	0.76 (19)	12.59 (319)
Average snowfall inches (cm)	6.4 (16)	2.7 (6.9)	4.5 (11)	0.9 (2.3)	0.0 (0.0)	0.0 (0.0)	0.0 (0.0)	0.0 (0.0)	0.0 (0.0)	1.6 (4.1)	2.5 (6.4)	4.7 (12)	23.3 (58.7)
Source: NOAA

=== Post office ===
There is a post office located in the village of Fence Lake, serving the zip code 87315.

== Demographics ==
Historical population
Census	Pop.	Note	%±
2020	17		—
U.S. Decennial Census

As of the 2010 census, the population of the Fence Lake CDP was 42, consisting of 23 households, of which 11 were families. Females were 54.8% of the population. The racial make-up of the CDP was 26.2% Native American, 71.4% White, and 2.4% Asian. Hispanic or Latino of any race was 4.8% of the population.

== Education ==
The area is within the Quemado Schools school district.

== Aggressive Christianity Missionary Training Corps ==
Shim Ra Na Ekklisia (also called Miracle River) is located near Fence Lake. It is a small community of Christians about 10 miles (16 km) to the east of the town. In July 1997, Deborah and Jim Green purchased 640 acres (260 ha), originally parts of the old Tingle Ranch at that location from Jonnie Head Real Estate. The Greens use the Fence Lake Post Office to mail out their publications.

== Gallery ==
The stage in the old school house

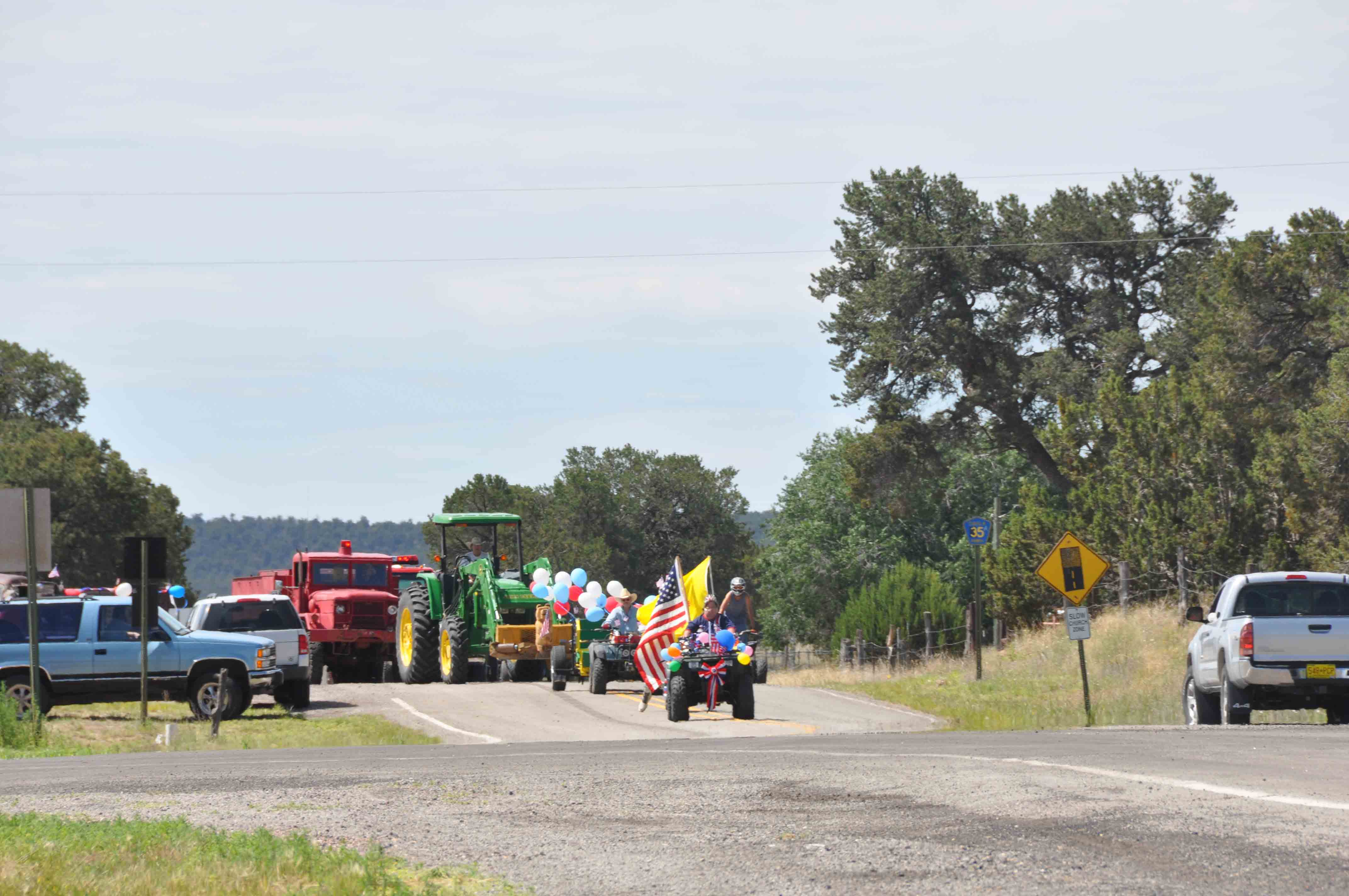
The start of the parade

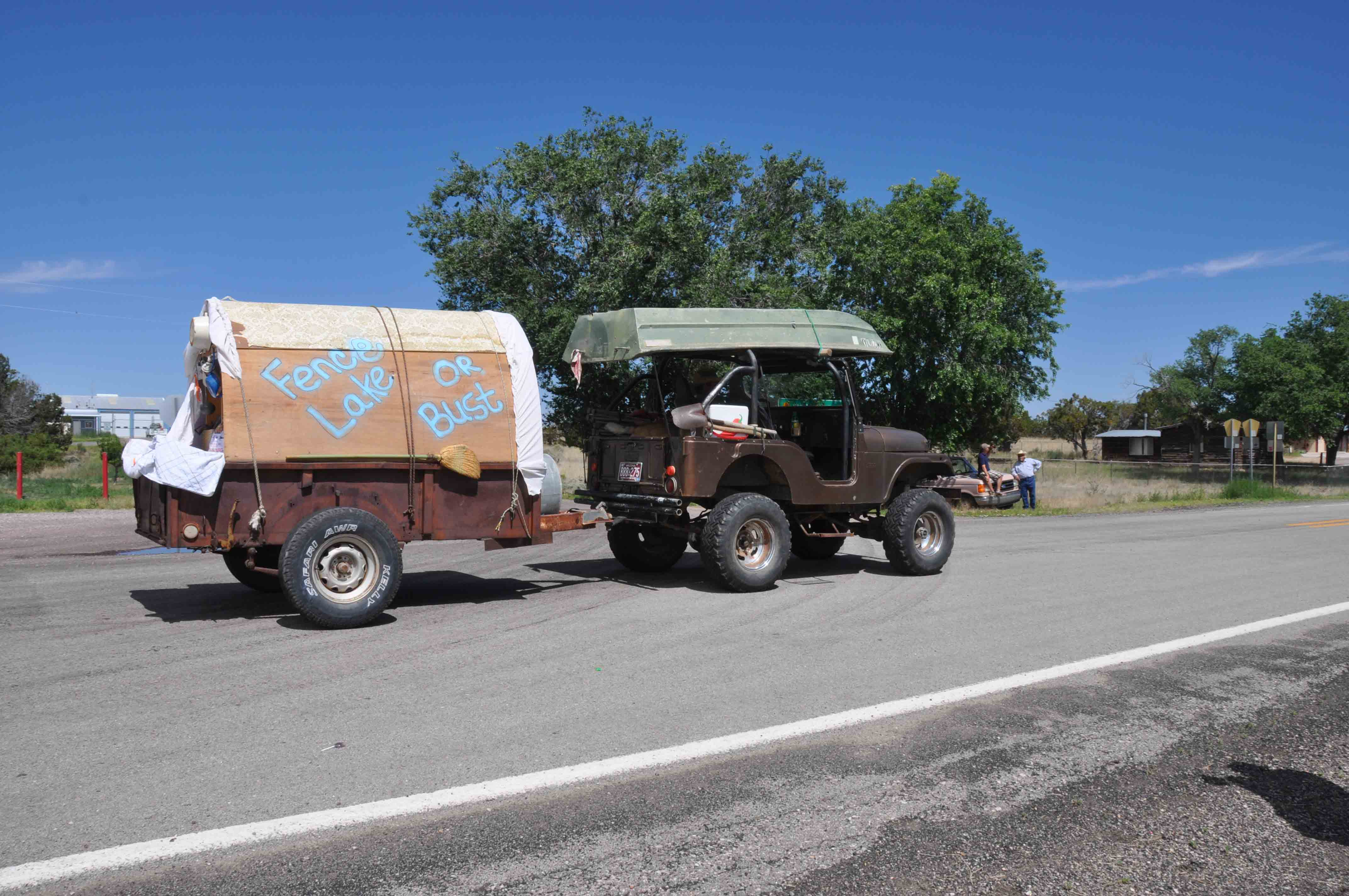
The chuck wagon

Fine words by local Manion Long

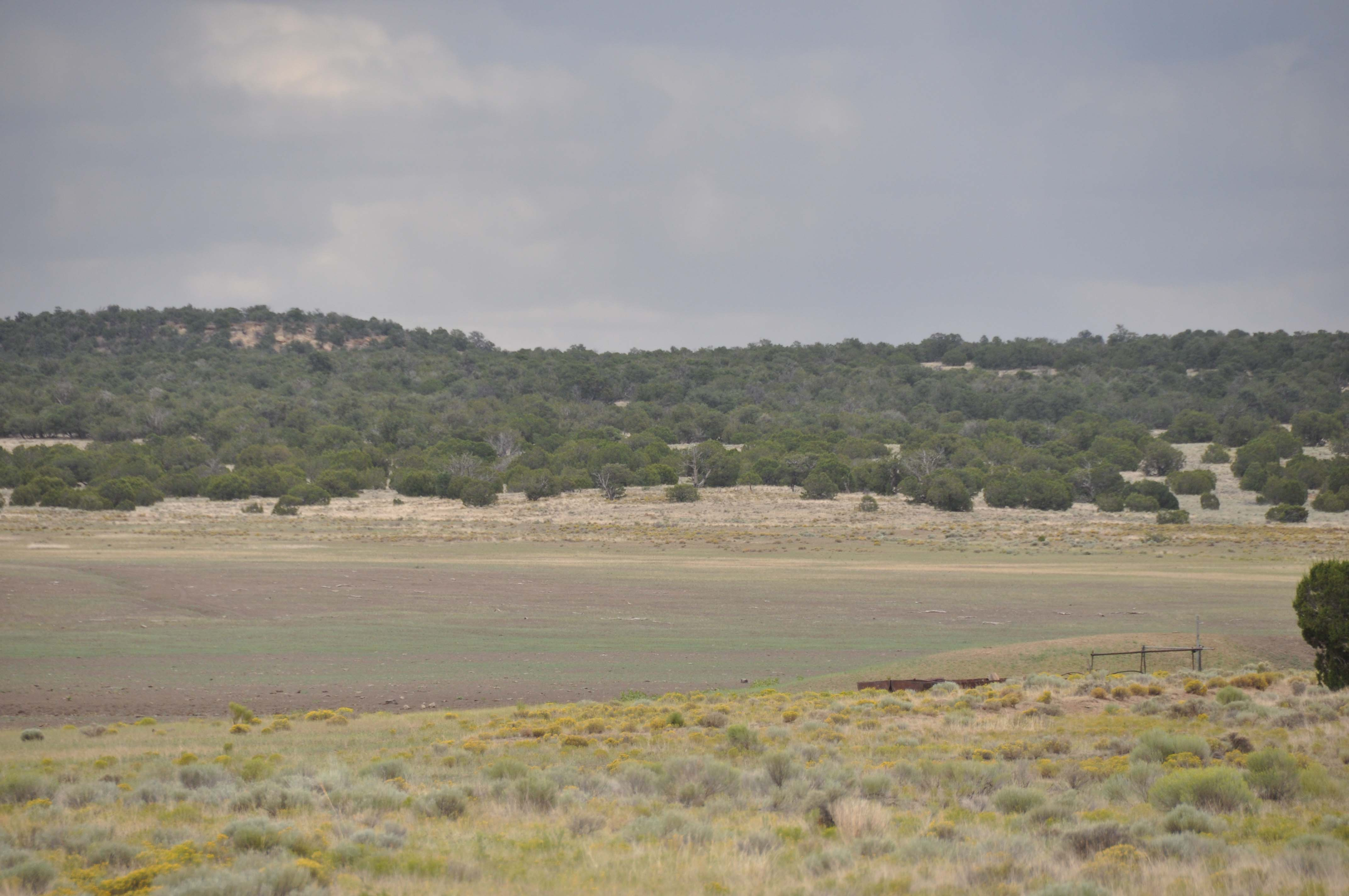
The lake bed today southeast of the village

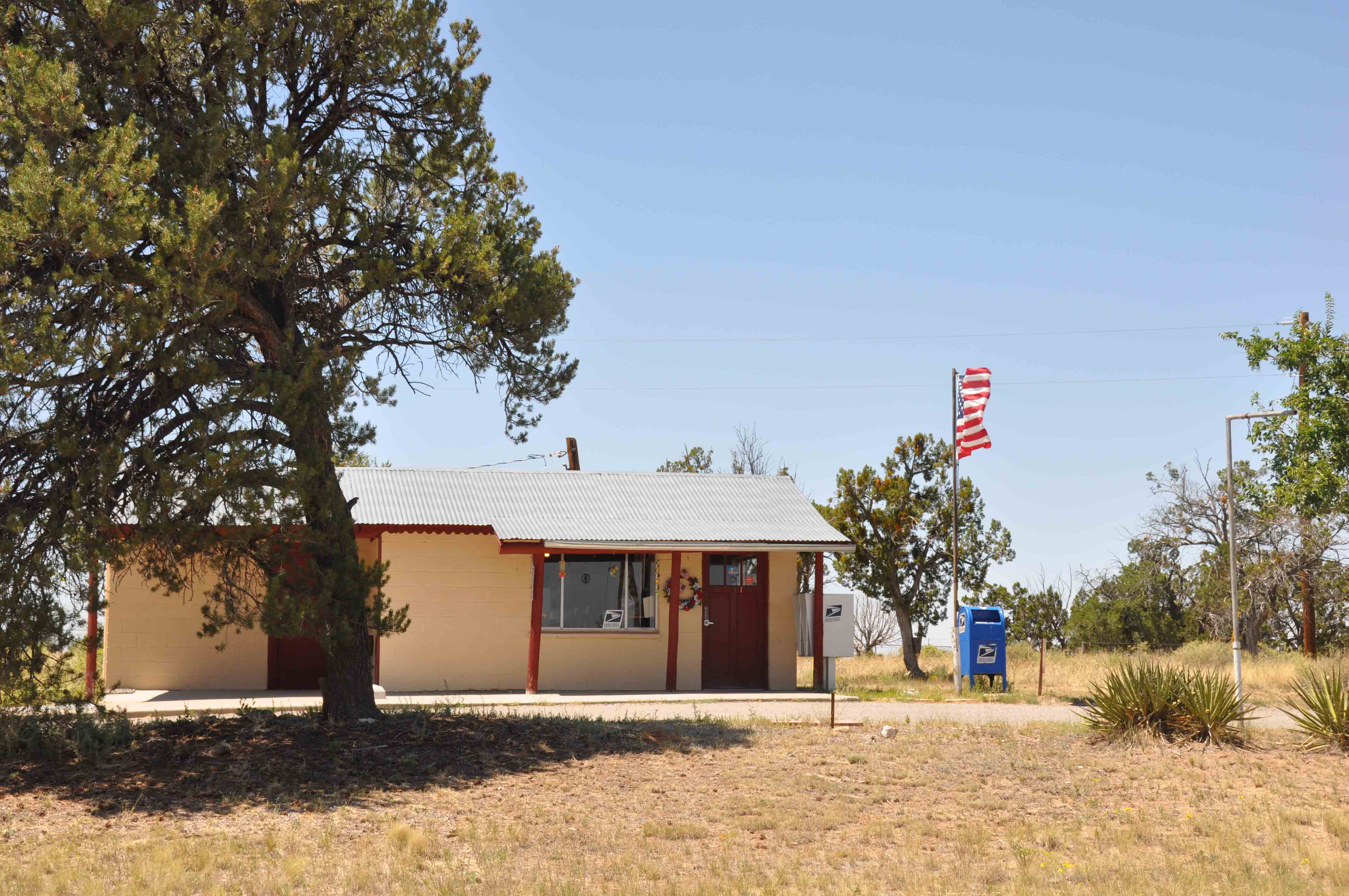
Post office in 2009

== See also ==
- List of census-designated places in New Mexico
