= Ramah Navajo Indian Reservation =

Section of the Navajo Nation

Coordinates: 34°50′47″N 108°22′46″W

Ramah (Navajo: Tł'ohchiní) is the non-contiguous southern exclave of the Navajo Nation

The Ramah Navajo Indian Reservation (Navajo: Tł'ohchiní) is a non-contiguous section of the Navajo Nation lying in parts of west-central Cibola and southern McKinley counties in New Mexico, United States, just east and southeast of the Zuni Indian Reservation. It has a land area of 230.675 sq mi (597.445 km^{2}), over 95 percent of which is designated as off-reservation trust land. According to the 2000 census, the resident population is 2,167 persons. The Ramah Reservation's land area is less than one percent of the Navajo Nation's total area.

Although part of the Navajo Nation, the Ramah Navajo Indian Reservation has had an independent history from that of the other Navajo lands. The Ramah Navajo have been recorded in this area of New Mexico since 1540, when they came to the aid of the Zuni in their defense against the Spanish conquistador Francisco Vásquez de Coronado.

In the years from 1868 through the 1960s, the Ramah Navajo acted independently of the Navajo Nation. Although part of the Navajo Nation since the 1960s, they accomplished some "firsts." They founded the Pine Hill community with its Pine Hill Navajo School and health clinic. Community leaders, professionals, and Michael Gross, a lawyer from the East who had begun to work in legal services for Native Americans, obtained funding directly from the U.S. Congress in the early 1970s for the school and clinic.

Although the Ramah Band of Navajo had lived on their lands for several centuries up to the 1970s, their rights to them had not been fully secured under United States law since a transfer by the U.S. government had not occurred. The Navajo on these lands were not eligible for the services and benefits provided by the governmental agencies and departments to federally recognized tribes on trust lands.

In 1979, the volunteer, Jan Crull, Jr. succeeded, securing Public Law 96-333 . He also taught the Ramah Navajo how to obtain all mineral rights underlying the lands he had secured for them with Public Law 97-434 . Crull's work led to his nomination by the Navajo for the Rockefeller Public Service Award in 1981, which was endorsed by U.S. senators Dennis DeConcini, Pete Domenici, and John Melcher; and U.S. congressmen Manuel Lujan, Jr. and Paul Simon.

== Ramah Navajo Police Force ==
Ramah is unique from the rest of the Navajo Nation with having its own police force and police district along with its own new detention center which opened in 2016.

== Navajo Council Delegate ==
Ramah Navajo Chapter is represented by Norman M. Begay who is one of the 24 Council Delegates who represents the nations 110 Chapters. He also Represents two other satellite chapters of Alamo and To'Hajiilee. He is also a part of the Navajo Nation Budget and Finance Committee.

== Education ==
There is a tribal school, Pine Hill Schools, operated by the Ramah Navajo School Board and associated with the Bureau of Indian Education (BIE).

Additionally the Gallup-McKinley County Schools is the local school district; the proximity of the nearest schools in Cibola County were so far, 50 miles (80 km) away, that Cibola and McKinley counties agreed to have students sent to McKinley County schools. As of 1995 it buses students from the reservation to Ramah Village: Ramah Elementary School and Ramah Middle/High School. The reservation is physically within the Grants-Cibola County Schools district.

=== History of education ===
Historically Native students in the reservation attended Bureau of Indian Affairs (BIA) boarding schools in New Mexico and other states. The BIA opened a Kindergarten through grade 3 day school, Mountain View Day School, on the reservation in 1943. It had an enrollment of 30 students at the start. In 1952 Ramah Navajo Native Americans were to vote on whether to send their children to a BIA dormitory in Ramah Village, which had the nearest school district-operated public schools. A Navajo named King Chee supported instead having an on-reservation school. After the Ramah Navajo approved the dormitory idea, the proposal was that the U.S. federal government would pay the New Mexico authorities for any Native American children attending New Mexican public schools. This dormitory opened in 1954, and Mountain View closed; this meant that the majority of reservation students could attend a local public school.

The Ramah Village public high school closed circa 1968, due to being condemned. At first secondary students were forced to attend distant BIA boarding schools as the dormitory in Ramah now only took elementary students, and the Gallup-McKinley school district did not bus to other public schools. The Navajo Legal System Program (DNA) sued the school district in August 1968 in an attempt to reopen the public school. The courts ruled that the reservation could have busing to Zuni Public Schools, but the Gallup-McKinley County district chose to not allow its buses to enter Cibola County, which contained the reservation. Therefore, the Ramah Navajo Indian School Board was established in 1970 and established a plan to open a tribal school, which it did in the ex-Ramah School in 1970; the tribal school moved to Pine Hill in 1975. In 1983 the Ramah Village public high school reopened.

In Summer 1994 the Ramah tribal government and the governments of Cibola County and McKinley County agreed to have two bus stops on the Ramah reservation, with one at the chapter house and another at a point to the south; this was approved by Alan Morgan, the New Mexico State Superintendent of Education. Area parents disliked the new bus stops, saying they had hazards and that they lacked the necessary space. Morgan approved establishing the bus stops deeper into the reservation, adjacent to Pine Hill schools and at the housing complex, and these stops began operation in December 1994. In January 1995 the Ramah Navajo chapter and the associated Ramah Navajo School Board, which operates Pine Hill Schools, sued the New Mexico Public Education Department and the Gallup McKinley County Schools arguing that the defendants breached the tribe's sovereignty by allowing the school district to extend school bus services further into the tribal grounds and therefore taking students who would have attended Pine Hill Schools and violating the previous agreement between the tribe and the counties.
