= Western New Mexico Correctional Facility =

Prison in Grants, New Mexico, U.S.

- Interactive map of Western New Mexico Correctional Facility
- Location: Grants, New Mexico, U.S.; 35°10′51.4″N 107°47′53.1″W
- Status: Operational
- Security class: Woman's Facility: Level 3 (Medium); Level 4 (Maximum); Men's Facility; Level 2 (Low/medium); Level 3 (Medium)
- Managed by: New Mexico Corrections Department
- Warden: Carl Wilken Grants, NM 87020
- Website: www.cd.nm.gov/divisions/adult-prisons/nmcd-prison-facilities/western-new-mexico-correctional-facility/

The Western New Mexico Correctional Facility is a prison in Grants, New Mexico, United States. It is operated by the New Mexico Corrections Department and consists of two separate facilities, one each for male and female inmates.

== Notable inmates ==
- Hannah Gutierrez-Reed
