= San Mateo, New Mexico =

- Census-designated place
- Location within New Mexico
- Coordinates: 35°20′17″N 107°38′42″W
- Country: United States
- State: New Mexico
- County: Cibola

Area
  - Total: 2.78 sq mi (7.19 km^{2})
  - Land: 2.78 sq mi (7.19 km^{2})
  - Water: 0.0039 sq mi (0.01 km^{2})
- Elevation: 7,225 ft (2,202 m)

Population (2020)
  - Total: 139
  - Density: 50.1/sq mi (19.35/km^{2})
- Time zone: UTC-7 (Mountain (MST))
  - Summer (DST): UTC-6 (MDT)
- ZIP code: 87020
- Area code: 505
- FIPS code: 35-35006
- GNIS feature ID: 2584209

San Mateo is a census-designated place in Cibola County, New Mexico, United States. As of the 2020 census, San Mateo had a population of 139.

The community has a Catholic church, a Baptist church, a Morada, a cemetery, a Volunteer Fire Department(McKinley County funded) and an old abandoned elementary school. It is also coined "the Uranium Capital of the World".

== Geography ==
San Mateo is 25 miles (40 km) from Grants. It overlooks Mount Taylor.

Historical population
Census	Pop.	Note	%±
2020	139		—
U.S. Decennial Census
