= Bibo, New Mexico =

- Census-designated place
- Location within New Mexico
- Coordinates: 35°10′24″N 107°24′12″W
- Country: United States
- State: New Mexico
- County: Cibola

Area
  - Total: 4.20 sq mi (10.87 km^{2})
  - Land: 4.19 sq mi (10.86 km^{2})
  - Water: 0.0077 sq mi (0.02 km^{2})
- Elevation: 6,506 ft (1,983 m)

Population (2020)
  - Total: 121
  - Density: 28.9/sq mi (11.14/km^{2})
- Time zone: UTC-7 (Mountain (MST))
  - Summer (DST): UTC-6 (MDT)
- FIPS code: 35-07145
- GNIS feature ID: 2584056

Bibo is an unincorporated community and census-designated place in Cibola County, New Mexico, United States. As of the 2020 census, Bibo had a population of 121.

Bibo is located approximately 13 miles (21 km) north of Laguna on Route 279 (north of Interstate 40). The town was named after the Bibo brothers, who settled in the area in the 1880s. Ben Bibo operated a trading post from 1895 to 1920.

== Demographics ==
Historical population
Census	Pop.	Note	%±
2020	121		—
U.S. Decennial Census
