= Candy Kitchen, New Mexico =

- Census-designated place
- Interactive map of Candy Kitchen, New Mexico
- Coordinates: 34°54′51″N 108°29′9″W
- Country: United States
- State: New Mexico
- County: Cibola
- Elevation: 7,415 ft (2,260 m)
- Time zone: Mountain (MST)
- GNIS feature ID: 2806689

Candy Kitchen is an unincorporated community in Cibola County, New Mexico, United States, in the northwestern part of the state.

As of the 2020 census, Candy Kitchen had a population of 107.

== Attraction ==
Candy Kitchen is the home of the Wild Spirit Wolf Sanctuary, which provides shelter for wolves and wolf-dog crosses that have been raised by people who can no longer provide care for them.
