= Ramah, New Mexico =

Ramah, New Mexico Tłʼohchiní (Navajo)
- Census-designated place
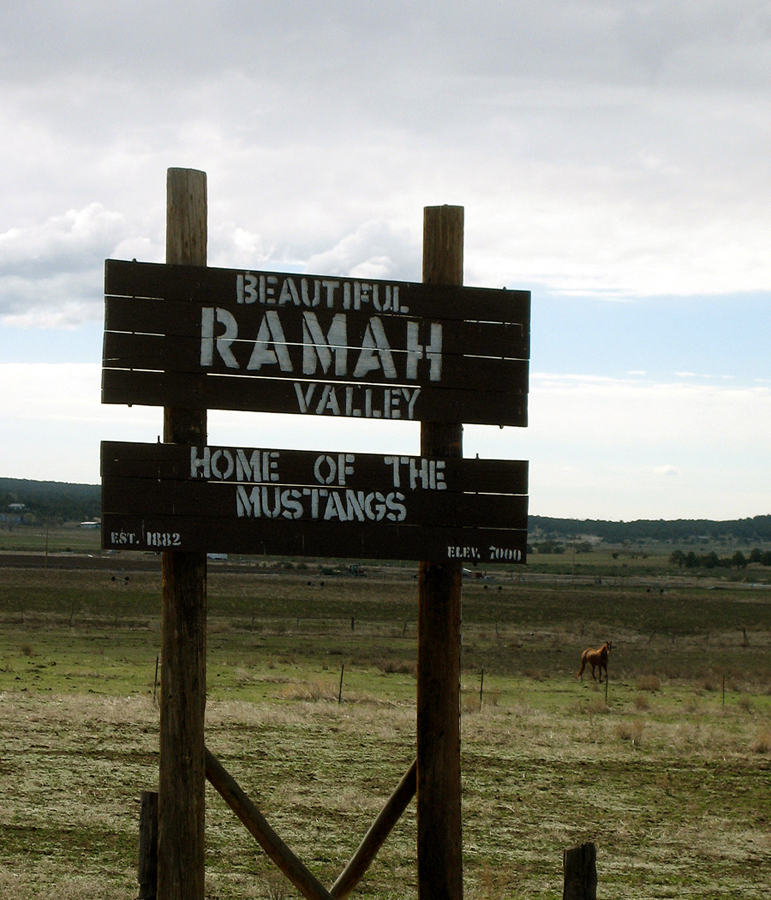
- Ramah welcome sign

- Location in McKinley County and the state of New Mexico

- Location in the United States
- Coordinates: 35°07′35″N 108°30′23″W
- Country: United States
- State: New Mexico
- County: McKinley

Area
  - Total: 12.27 sq mi (31.77 km^{2})
  - Land: 12.27 sq mi (31.77 km^{2})
  - Water: 0 sq mi (0.00 km^{2})
- Elevation: 6,907 ft (2,105 m)

Population (2020)
  - Total: 461
  - Density: 37.6/sq mi (14.51/km^{2})
- Time zone: UTC-7 (Mountain (MST))
  - Summer (DST): UTC-6 (MDT)
- ZIP code: 87321
- Area code: 505
- FIPS code: 35-61220
- GNIS feature ID: 2409127

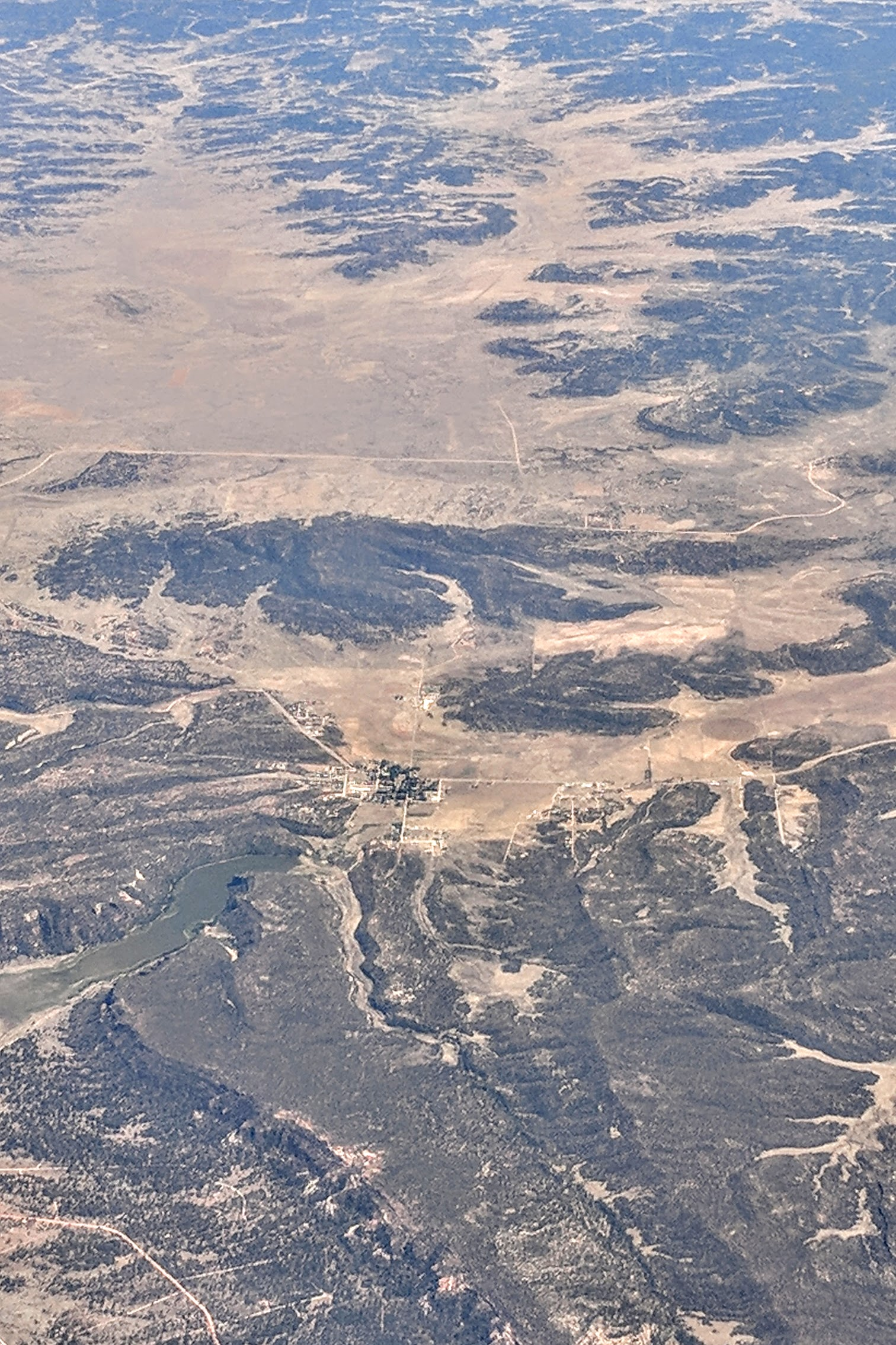
Aerial view of Ramah Reservoir and the community of Ramah

Ramah (Navajo: Tłʼohchiní – "place of wild onions") is an unincorporated community and census-designated place (CDP) in McKinley County, New Mexico. The population was 461 as of the 2020 United States census.

== History ==
Established in 1876, Ramah was one of fifty locations in the New Mexico Territory settled, under the direction of Brigham Young, by Mormon pioneers, and is one of only three that remain today. Ramah was originally settled for the purpose of missionary work to be carried out within the Zuni and Navajo communities. Many of the original stone houses are still standing and are a testament to the hard work and skill of Ramah's early founders. One such building has been restored and preserved as a museum to display the heritage of the valley's past.

Ramah Lake was built by these same pioneers in order to farm the surrounding area, which receives moderate rainfall on a yearly basis. The lake relies on snowfall and spring runoff to sustain its water levels. This trait is shared by many areas in the state of New Mexico. In recent years, due to drought, the lake has dried up; the town irrigation committee used this low water level to make improvements including dredging a large amount of silt buildup and reinforcing the dam, allowing water to be used more efficiently. Modernization in irrigation has allowed water to be used more effectively.

== Geography ==
Ramah is in southwestern McKinley County and is bordered to the east by Cibola County. New Mexico State Road 53 passes through Ramah, leading 11 miles (18 km) to El Morro National Monument and west 22 miles (35 km) to Zuni Pueblo. Gallup, the McKinley county seat, is 44 miles (71 km) northwest of Ramah by road.

Lying at 6,926 feet (2,111 m) above sea level, Ramah is considered by some as a high desert, but at higher elevations it includes tall pines, sandstone cliffs, and timber-covered mountains. Much of the lower landscape in the surrounding area is covered with lava flows from the chain of volcanos to the south.

Ramah lies between the Zuni Indian Reservation to the west, the Ramah Navajo Indian Reservation, and the Cibola National Forest to the north.

According to the U.S. Census Bureau, the Ramah CDP has a total area of 12.3 square miles (32 km^{2}), all land. The town center lies in the valley of Cebolla Creek, a west-flowing tributary of the Rio Pescado, part of the Zuni River watershed leading southwest to the Little Colorado River in Arizona. Ramah Reservoir, built on Cebolla Creek, sits just outside the community to the north.

== Demographics ==
Historical population
Census	Pop.	Note	%±
2000	407		—
2010	370		−9.1%
2020	461		24.6%
U.S. Decennial Census

As of the census of 2000, there were 407 people, 121 households, and 98 families residing in the CDP. The population density was 106.9 inhabitants per square mile (41.3/km^{2}). There were 175 housing units at an average density of 46.0 per square mile (17.8/km^{2}). The racial makeup of the CDP was 64.86% White, 25.80% Native American, 0.98% Pacific Islander, 0.74% from other races, and 7.62% from two or more races. Hispanic or Latino of any race were 6.63% of the population.

There were 121 households, out of which 50.4% had children under the age of 18 living with them, 66.9% were married couples living together, 10.7% had a female householder with no husband present, and 18.2% were non-families. 17.4% of all households were made up of individuals, and 8.3% had someone living alone who was 65 years of age or older. The average household size was 3.36 and the average family size was 3.81.

In the CDP, the population was spread out, with 37.6% under the age of 18, 8.8% from 18 to 24, 24.6% from 25 to 44, 18.4% from 45 to 64, and 10.6% who were 65 years of age or older. The median age was 28 years. For every 100 females, there were 115.3 males. For every 100 females age 18 and over, there were 93.9 males.

The median income for a household in the CDP was $25,313, and the median income for a family was $35,278. Males had a median income of $17,143 versus $19,792 for females. The per capita income for the CDP was $10,419. About 23.0% of families and 31.2% of the population were below the poverty line, including 46.8% of those under age 18 and 11.9% of those age 65 or over.

== Religion ==
In 1968 the community was mostly made up of Mormons.

== Education ==
Gallup-McKinley County Schools, the local school district, operates Ramah Elementary School and Ramah Middle/High School in Ramah. Due to an agreement between McKinley County and Cibola County, residents of the Ramah Navajo Indian Reservation are bussed to these schools even though they are physically in Cibola County due to the long distance of the nearest Cibola County schools away from the reservation.

In 1954, a dormitory opened at Ramah Schools, which allowed the majority of residents of the Ramah Navajo Indian Reservation to attend public schools close to their residences. The Ramah Village public high school closed in 1968, due to being condemned. The district also stated that the enrollment was too low. Area secondary students were reassigned to Zuni High School, then in the Gallup-McKinley district. Accordingly the dormitory became restricted only to elementary school students. Ramah Navajo High School opened in the former Ramah High School in 1970; in 1975 it moved to Pinehill, where it became Pine Hill Schools. In 1983 the Ramah Village public high school reopened. In 1995 the combined enrollment of this school and the elementary school in Ramah was fewer than 400.

== Gallery ==
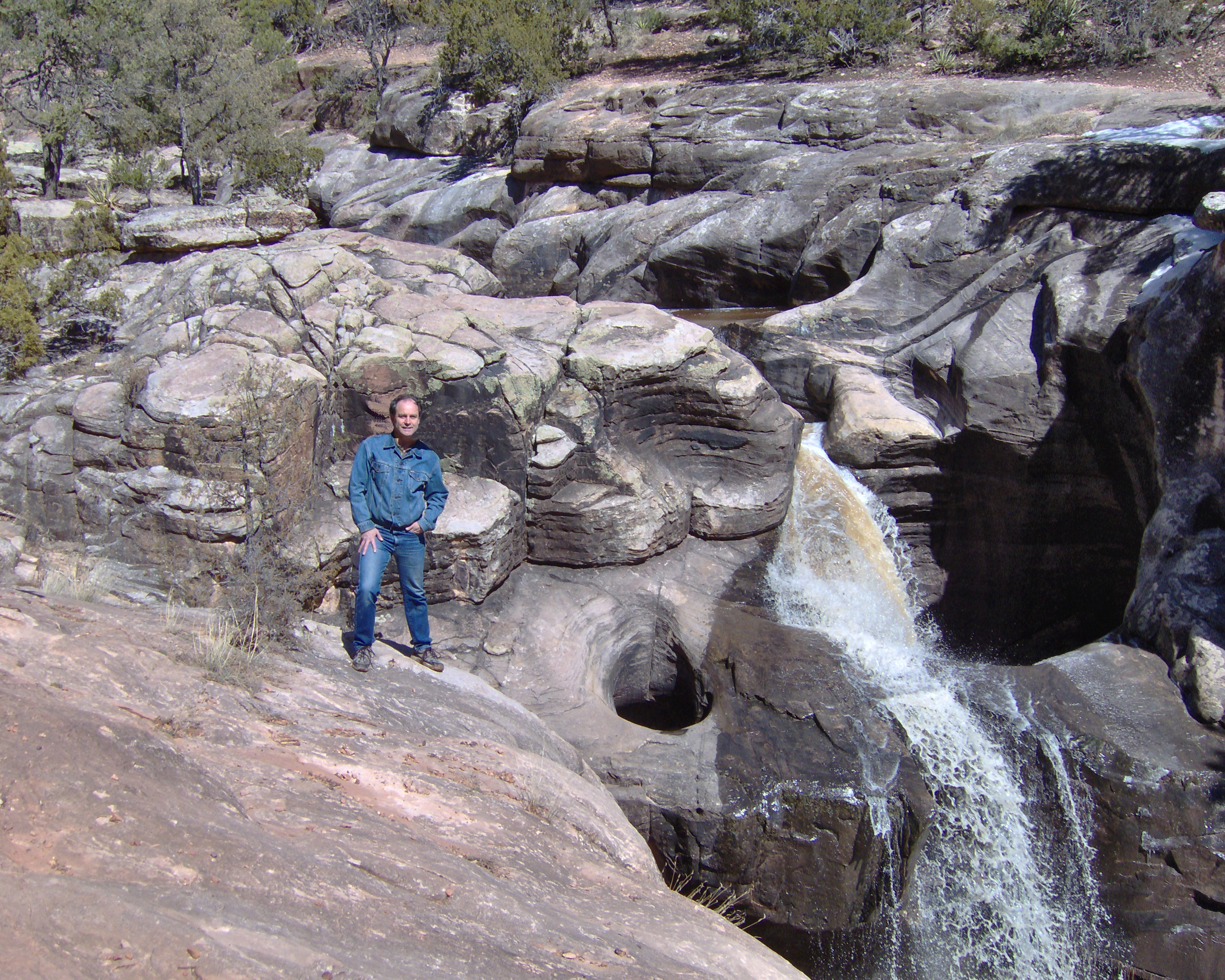
Ramah Falls 7 miles (11 km) northeast of town

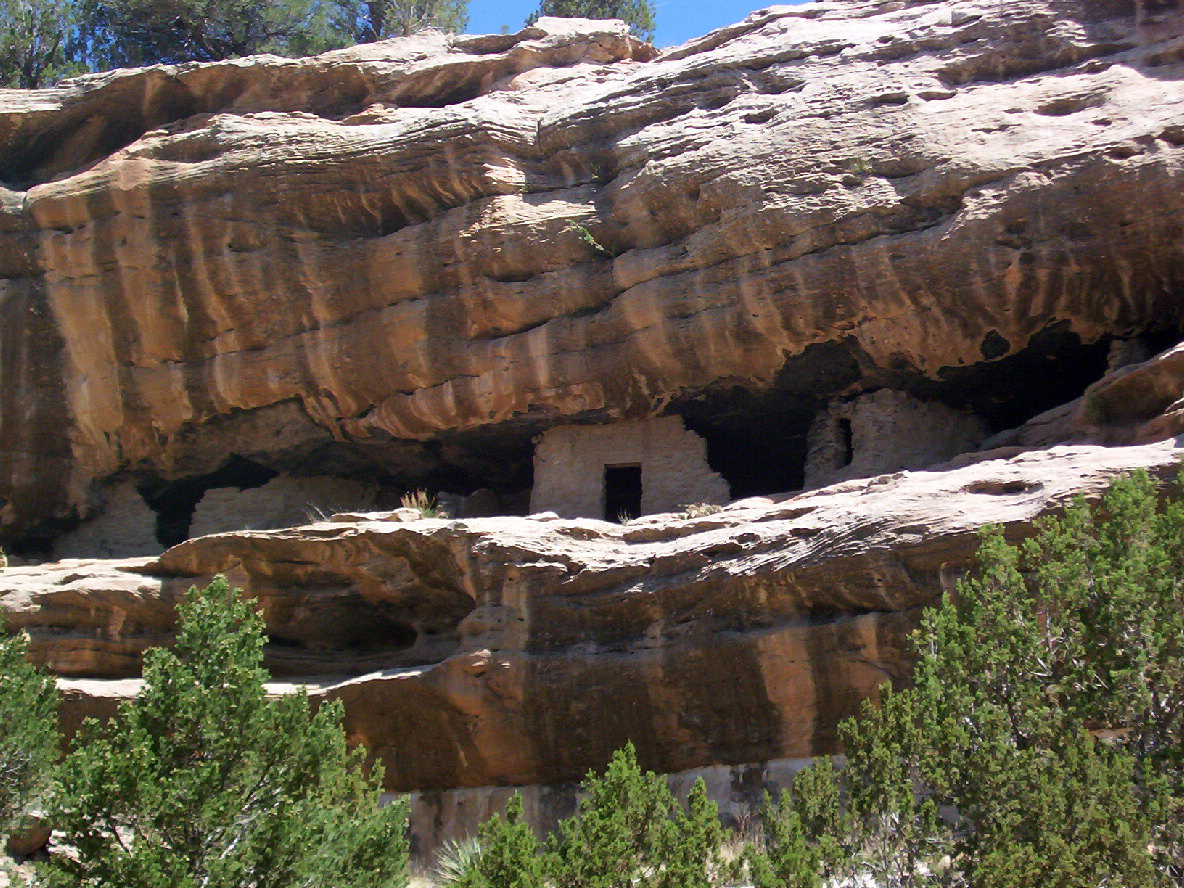
Ancient cliff dwellings in South/East Ramah
