= Grants/Cibola County Schools =

School district in New Mexico, United States

Grants/Cibola County Schools (GCCS) is a school district based in Grants, New Mexico, United States.

== Attendance area ==
GCCS's attendance boundary includes most of Cibola County, including the city of Grants. Exceptions are areas on the Zuni Reservation and Fence Lake. While the Ramah Navajo Indian Reservation is physically within Grants/Cibola County Schools, children going to non-tribal public schools are bussed to Ramah's schools, which are operated by the Gallup-McKinley County Schools. The proximity of the nearest schools in Cibola County were so far, 50 miles (80 km) away, that Cibola and McKinley counties agreed to have students on the reservation sent to McKinley County schools, including Ramah Elementary School and Ramah Middle/High School.

== Schools ==
=== Secondary schools ===
==== 6-12 schools ====
- Laguna Acoma Middle High School

==== High schools ====
- Grants High School

==== Middle schools ====
- Los Alamitos Middle School

=== Primary schools ===
- Bluewater Elementary School
- Cubero Elementary School
- Mesa View Elementary School (Grants)
  Mesa View is one of two elementary schools in Grants. It along with Mount Taylor Elementary serve Grants. Mesa View was founded in 1940, and today has over 400 children attending.
- Milan Elementary School (Milan)
- Mount Taylor Elementary School (Grants)
- San Rafael Elementary School
- Seboyeta Elementary School
