= Milan, New Mexico =

- Village
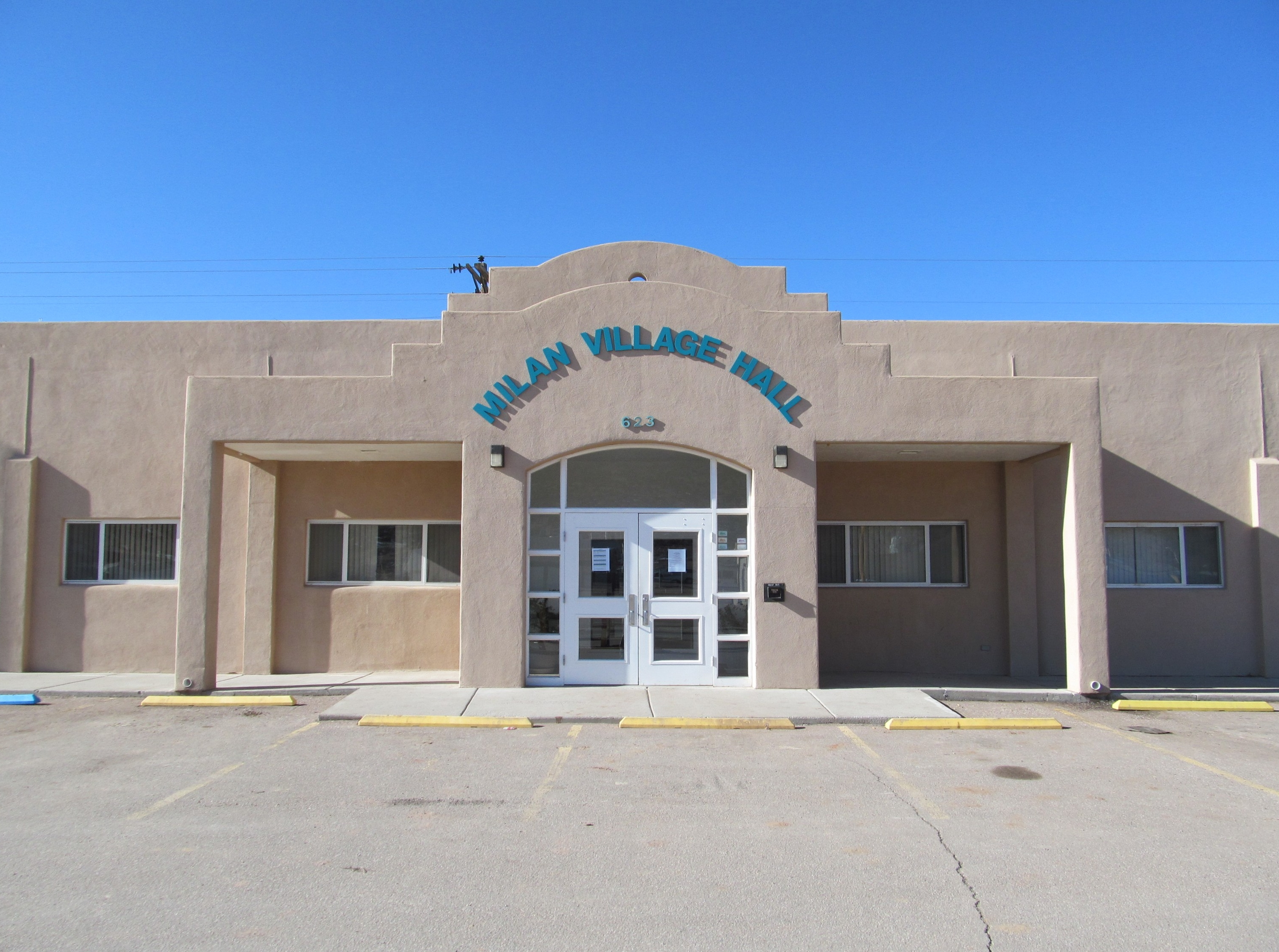
- Village Hall, January 2021

- Location of Milan in Cibola County

- Location in New Mexico Location in the United States
- Coordinates: 35°12′05″N 107°52′55″W
- Country: United States
- State: New Mexico
- County: Cibola

Area
  - Total: 4.34 sq mi (11.25 km^{2})
  - Land: 4.34 sq mi (11.24 km^{2})
  - Water: 0.0039 sq mi (0.01 km^{2})
- Elevation: 6,532 ft (1,991 m)

Population (2020)
  - Total: 2,456
  - Density: 566.0/sq mi (218.55/km^{2})
- Time zone: UTC-7 (Mountain (MST))
  - Summer (DST): UTC-6 (MDT)
- ZIP code: 87021
- Area code: 505
- FIPS code: 35-48620
- GNIS feature ID: 2413573
- Website: www.villageofmilan.com

Milan is a village in Cibola County, New Mexico, United States. The population was 2,456 at the 2020 census.

A suburb of Grants, Milan's population grew by over 1,300 between 2000 and 2010, a rate of 71.6%. Many new houses and service-oriented businesses are being built. Milan is the site of the privately run Cibola County Correctional Center, which houses more than 1,000 federal prisoners and is a major employer.

The village was incorporated in 1957 and named for Salvador Milan, owner of the land through his wife, Veneranda Mirabal, whose father had large land holdings here.

== Geography ==
Milan is bordered to the southeast by Grants, the county seat.

Interstate 40 runs through the village, with access via Exit 79. New Mexico State Road 122, formerly U.S. Route 66, passes through the eastern side of town. Via I-40 it is 80 miles (130 km) east to Albuquerque and west 58 miles (93 km) to Gallup.

Railroad freight service is provided by BNSF, and Amtrak passenger trains pass through; the nearest station is at Gallup.

According to the United States Census Bureau, the village has a total area of 4.34 square miles (11.25 km^{2}), of which 0.004 square miles (0.01 km^{2}), or 0.11%, is water.

== Demographics ==
Historical population
Census	Pop.	Note	%±
1960	2,658		—
1970	2,222		−16.4%
1980	3,747		68.6%
1990	1,911		−49.0%
2000	1,891		−1.0%
2010	3,245		71.6%
2020	2,456		−24.3%
U.S. Decennial Census

=== 2020 census ===
As of the 2020 census, Milan had a population of 2,456. The median age was 36.4 years. 20.4% of residents were under the age of 18 and 12.3% of residents were 65 years of age or older. For every 100 females there were 151.6 males, and for every 100 females age 18 and over there were 170.3 males age 18 and over.

71.0% of residents lived in urban areas, while 29.0% lived in rural areas.

There were 704 households in Milan, of which 36.2% had children under the age of 18 living in them. Of all households, 36.6% were married-couple households, 24.9% were households with a male householder and no spouse or partner present, and 28.6% were households with a female householder and no spouse or partner present. About 25.7% of all households were made up of individuals and 11.0% had someone living alone who was 65 years of age or older.

There were 812 housing units, of which 13.3% were vacant. The homeowner vacancy rate was 1.4% and the rental vacancy rate was 11.0%.

Racial composition as of the 2020 census
Race	Number	Percent
White	1,105	45.0%
Black or African American	64	2.6%
American Indian and Alaska Native	525	21.4%
Asian	6	0.2%
Native Hawaiian and Other Pacific Islander	3	0.1%
Some other race	390	15.9%
Two or more races	363	14.8%
Hispanic or Latino (of any race)	1,180	48.0%

=== 2000 census ===
At the 2000 census, there were 1,891 people, 673 households and 475 families residing in the village. The population density was 648.9 inhabitants per square mile (250.5/km^{2}). There were 806 housing units at an average density of 276.6 per square mile (106.8/km^{2}). The racial makeup was 51.03% White, 1.32% African American, 13.96% Native American, 28.87% from other races, and 4.81% from two or more races. Hispanic or Latino of any race were 52.30% of the population.

There were 673 households, of which 39.5% had children under the age of 18 living with them, 49.0% were married couples living together, 15.8% had a female householder with no husband present, and 29.3% were non-families. 24.7% of all households were made up of individuals, and 9.4% had someone living alone who was 65 years of age or older. The average household size was 2.81 and the average family size was 3.33.

32.6% of the population were under the age of 18, 10.7% from 18 to 24, 26.9% from 25 to 44, 19.6% from 45 to 64, and 10.3% who were 65 years of age or older. The median age was 30 years. For every 100 females, there were 99.1 males. For every 100 females age 18 and over, there were 93.6 males.

The median household income was $24,635 and the median family income was $26,776. Males had a median income of $28,594 and females $18,750. The per capita income was $10,463. About 21.9% of families and 28.2% of the population were below the poverty line, including 38.6% of those under age 18 and 8.8% of those age 65 or over.

== Education ==
All public schools in the county are operated by Grants/Cibola County Schools. One school, Milan Elementary School, is located in the village. Students continue on to Los Alamitos Middle School and Grants High School. Both are in the city of Grants.

== See also ==
- List of municipalities in New Mexico
