= National Register of Historic Places listings in Torrance County, New Mexico =

Location of Torrance County in New Mexico

This is a list of the National Register of Historic Places listings in Torrance County, New Mexico.

This is intended to be a complete list of the properties and districts on the National Register of Historic Places in Torrance County, New Mexico, United States. Latitude and longitude coordinates are provided for many National Register properties and districts; these locations may be seen together in a map.

There are 11 properties and districts listed on the National Register in the county, including 2 National Historic Landmarks and 1 National Monument. All of the places within the county on the National Register are also listed on the State Register of Cultural Properties with the single exception of Abo.

This National Park Service list is complete through NPS recent listings posted March 14, 2025.

Contents: NRHP in New Mexico by county
Bernalillo – Catron – Chaves – Cibola – Colfax – Curry – De Baca – Doña Ana – Eddy – Grant – Guadalupe – Harding – Hidalgo – Lea – Lincoln – Los Alamos – Luna – McKinley – Mora – Otero – Quay – Rio Arriba – Roosevelt – San Juan – San Miguel – Sandoval – Santa Fe – Sierra – Socorro – Taos – Torrance – Union – Valencia

== Current listings ==
	Name on the Register	Image	Date listed	Location	City or town	Description
1	Abo	Abo	October 15, 1966 (#66000497)	3 miles west of Abo on U.S. Route 60; 34°26′56″N 106°22′17″W	Abo	Part of Salinas Pueblo Missions National Monument
2	Duran Historic District		January 21, 2021 (#100005733)	Roughly bounded by NM 3, Vidal and East Sts., and Park Ave. 34°28′11″N 105°23′46″W	Duran	
3	Gran Quivera Historic District	Gran Quivera Historic District	June 15, 2015 (#15000355)	Along NM 55 approx. 25 mi. S. of Mountainair; 34°15′55″N 106°06′09″W	Mountainair vicinity	Part of Salinas Pueblo Missions National Monument; extends into Socorro County
4	Greene Evans Garage	Greene Evans Garage	November 22, 1993 (#93001211)	Northwestern corner of the junction of Broadway and former U.S. Route 66; 35°00′19″N 106°03′00″W	Moriarty	
5	Moriarty Eclipse Windmill	Moriarty Eclipse Windmill	June 4, 1979 (#79001561)	2 miles (3.2 km) west of Moriarty off State Road 222; 34°59′48″N 106°04′55″W	Moriarty	
6	Mountainair Municipal Auditorium	Mountainair Municipal Auditorium	April 30, 1987 (#87000651)	Southwestern corner of Roosevelt Ave. and Beal St. 34°31′16″N 106°14′34″W	Mountainair	
7	Quarai	Quarai	October 15, 1966 (#66000498)	1 mile south of Punta de Agua; 34°35′45″N 106°17′42″W	Punta de Agua	Part of Salinas Pueblo Missions National Monument
8	Rancho Bonito	Rancho Bonito	November 29, 1978 (#78001834)	South of Mountainair on Gran Quivera Rd. 34°30′23″N 106°14′21″W	Mountainair	
9	Salinas Pueblo Missions National Monument	Salinas Pueblo Missions National Monument	October 15, 1966 (#66000494)	1 mile (1.6 km) east of Gran Quivira on State Road 10; 34°15′35″N 106°05′25″W	Mountainair	Extends into Socorro County
10	Shaffer Hotel	Shaffer Hotel	November 15, 1978 (#78003077)	Broadway St. 34°31′08″N 106°14′31″W	Mountainair	
11	Willard Mercantile Company	Willard Mercantile Company	December 14, 2018 (#100003219)	101 E. Broadway; 34°31′13″N 106°14′24″W	Mountainair	

== See also ==
- List of National Historic Landmarks in New Mexico
- National Register of Historic Places listings in New Mexico
