= Mountainair Middle/High School =

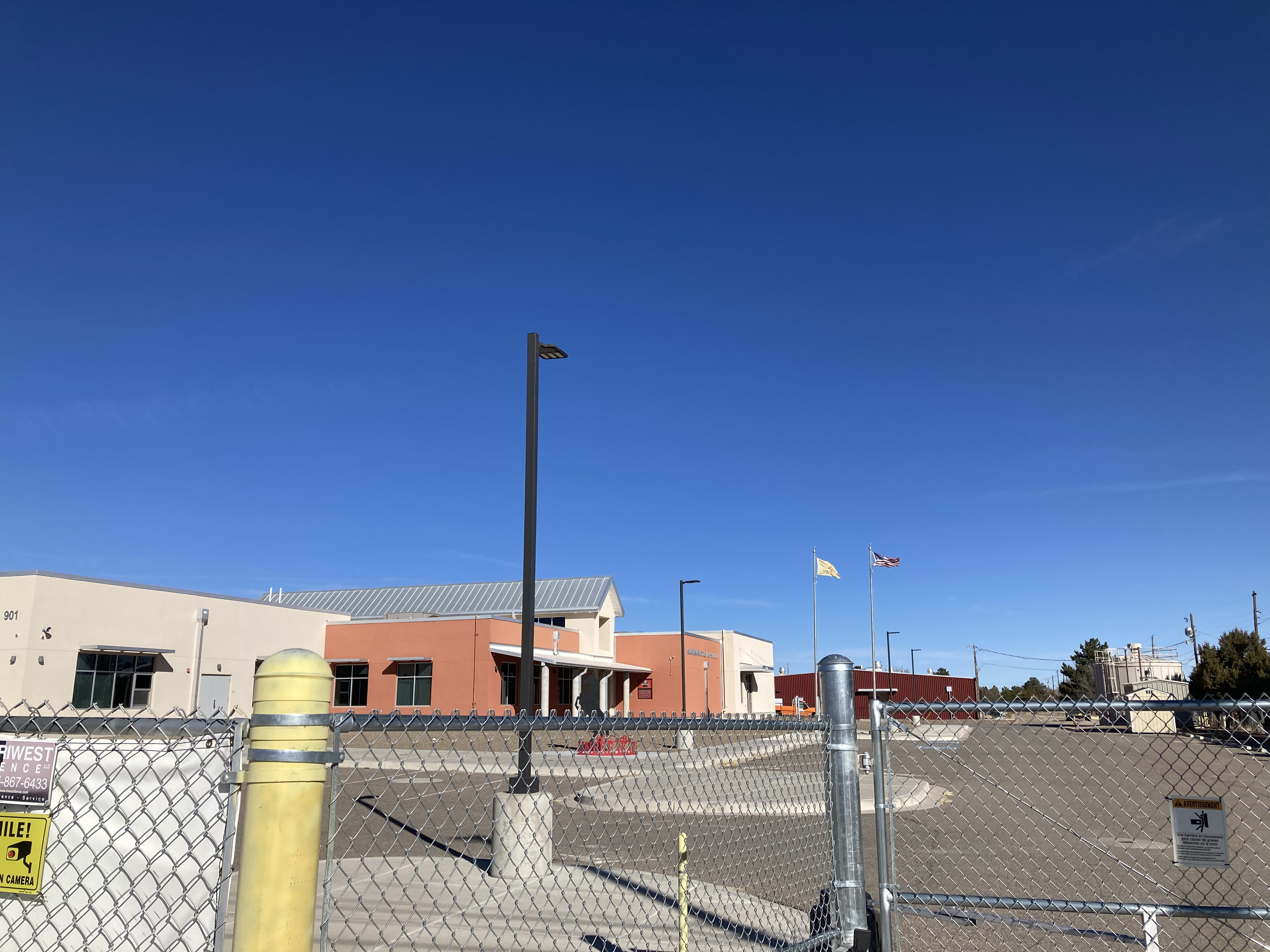
- Mountainair Middle School

Location
- 901 W 3rd St, Mountainair, NM 87036; Mountainair, Torrance County, New Mexico; 34°31′07″N 106°15′02″W

Information
- School type: Public Middle/High school
- Established: c. 1917
- School district: Mountainair Public Schools
- Principal: Jennifer Vigil
- Grades: 6–12
- Enrollment: 112
- Mascot: Mustang
- Website: mshs.mpschools.net

Mountainair Middle/High School is a combined public school in Mountainair, New Mexico. As of 2024, the school serves a combined 112 students. It is a part of Mountainair Public Schools.

== History ==
The town of Mountainair was established in Torrance County, New Mexico, in 1903. Relatively soon after its incorporation, Mountainair established a school circa 1917, which was placed near the railroad tracks and the Abo Hotel. The building burned down in 1925.

== Communities served ==
As well as serving Mountainair, Mountainair Middle/High School serves the communities of Deer Canyon, Manzano and Punta de Agua, as well as northern sections of Socorro County.

== Athletics ==
=== Football ===
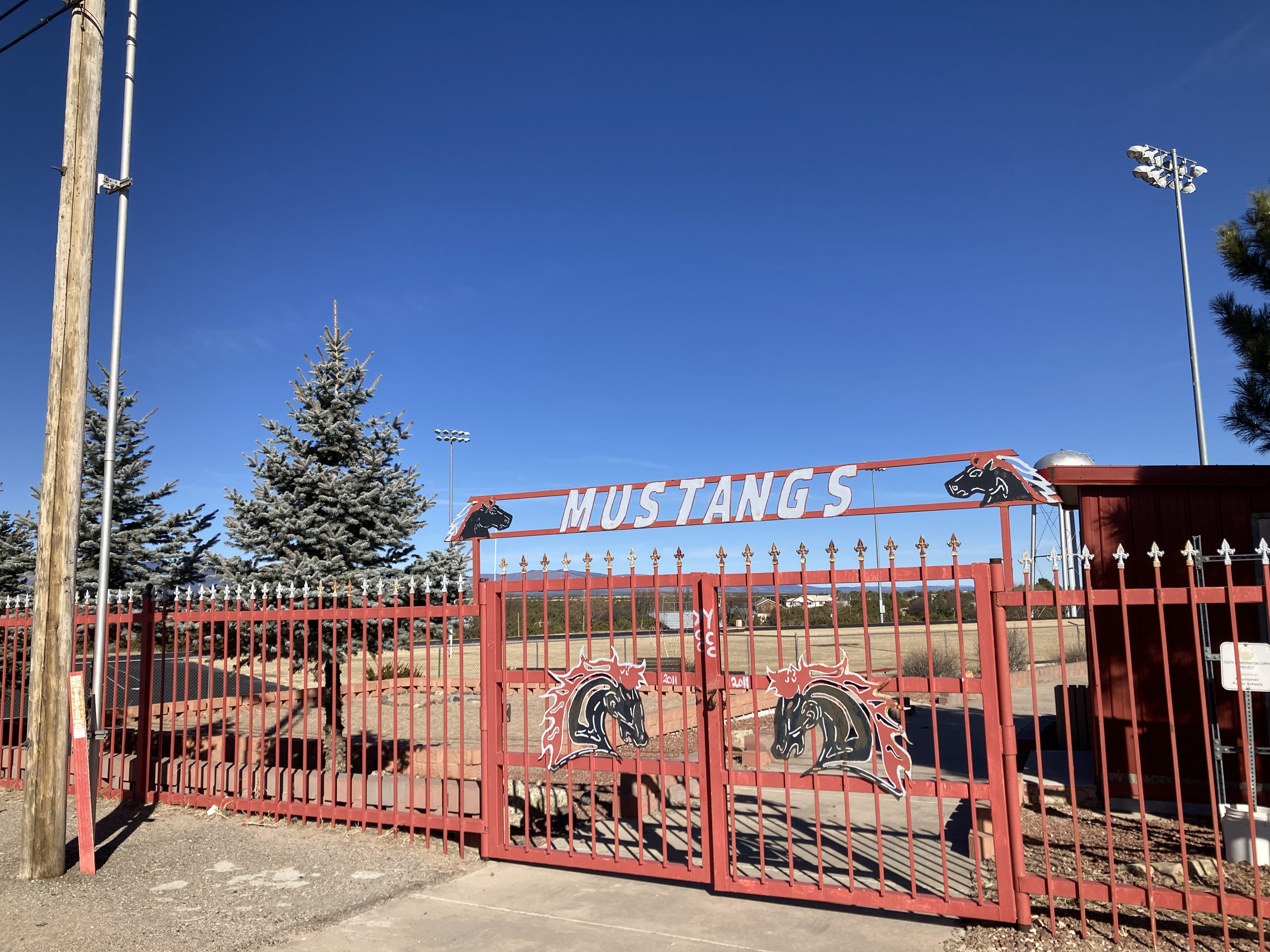
Entrance to Mountainair Stadium

Mountainair High School participates in six-man football in New Mexico. The most recent final appearance was against Gateway Christian in 2022, which they lost 53–14. Their most recent title was in eight-man football in 2007, where they won the final 38–26.

=== Allegations of misconduct ===
In early 2023, Mountainair Public Schools announced on Facebook that allegations of inappropriate conduct in the school's basketball and football teams would lead to the postponement of games to an unknown date. The basketball team was accused of extreme hazing, including reports of a 'rape room'. However, the official investigations found no sexual assaults had occurred, and that the room was only a scare tactic used by upperclassmen. Superintendent Dawn Apodaca confirmed that outside investigations substantiated none of the claims.

== Notable alumni ==
- David Parker Ray, serial killer.
