= Quarai =

- U.S. National Register of Historic Places
- U.S. National Historic Landmark District
- U.S. National Monument
- NM State Register of Cultural Properties
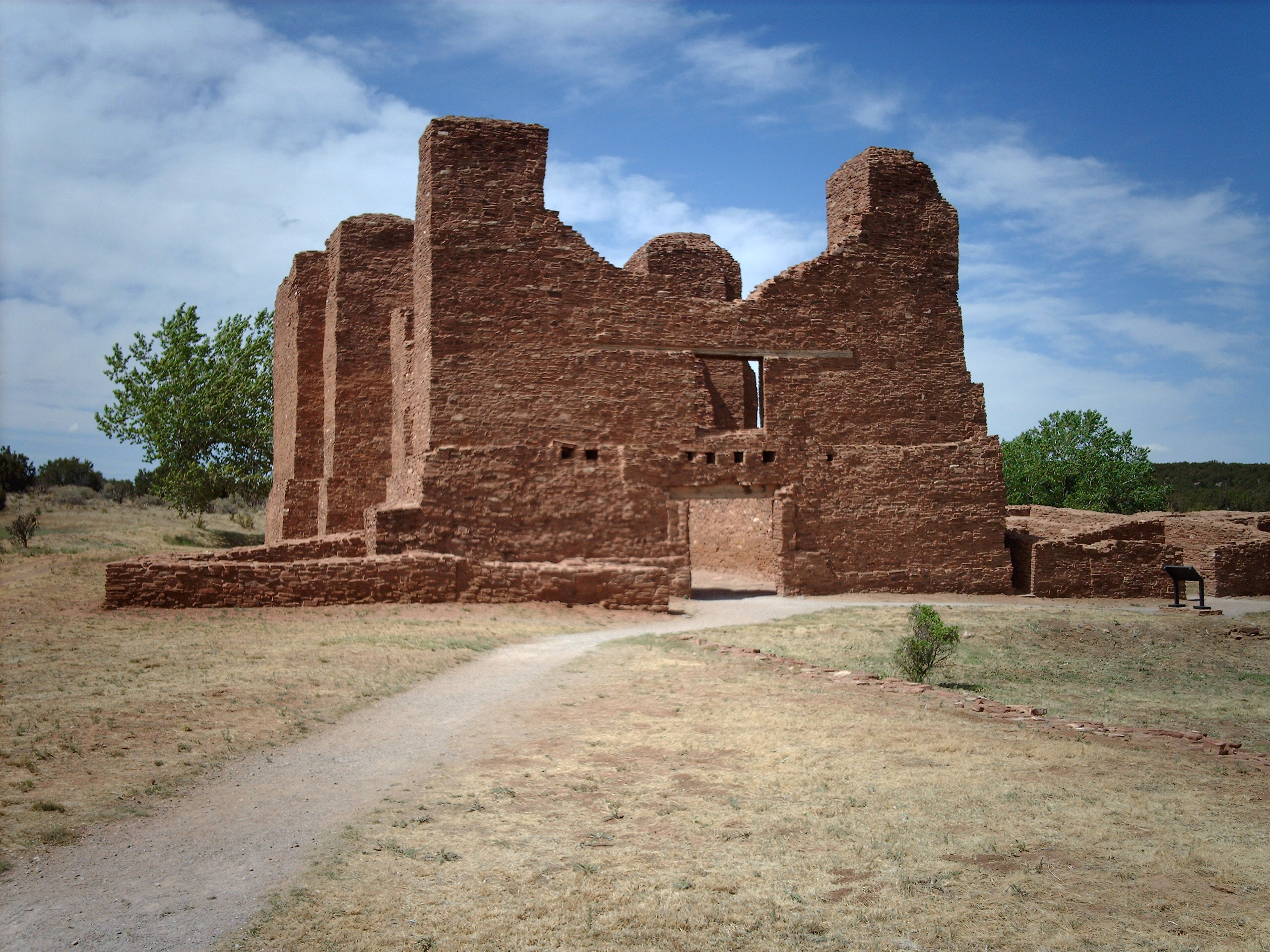
- Quarai Ruins in Salinas Pueblo Missions National Monument

- Location within New Mexico Location within the United States
- Nearest city: Punta de Agua, New Mexico
- Coordinates: 34°35′45″N 106°17′42″W
- Area: 65 acres (26 ha)
- Built: 1200
- Part of: Salinas Pueblo Missions National Monument
- NRHP reference No.: 66000498
- NMSRCP No.: 238

Significant dates
- Added to NRHP: October 15, 1966
- Designated NHLD: June 13, 1962
- Designated NMON: December 19, 1980
- Designated NMSRCP: February 1, 1972

Quarai, also known historically as Quarai State Monument, is a prehistoric and historic unit of the Salinas Pueblo Missions National Monument located north of Mountainair, New Mexico. A National Historic Landmark District, it encompasses the archaeological remains of prehistoric Native American settlements, historic remains of a pueblo that was abandoned in the 1670s during the Spanish colonial period, the ruins of a 17th-century Spanish mission compound, and 19th-century Spanish ranching artifacts. The site was designated a National Historic Landmark in 1962, and was added to the Salinas Pueblo Missions National Monument in 1980.

== Description and history ==
The Quarai ruins are located in central New Mexico, in a rural desert setting about 8 miles (13 km) north of Mountainair, where the main visitors center for the Salinas Pueblos National Monument is located. The largest features of the ruins are the main pueblo and the walls of the mission church, which was probably one of the largest wall and beam structures in North America. The walls range in thickness from three to six feet, and probably reached a height of 40 feet (12 m). Also present are mounds representing the archaeological sites of earlier buildings, and two extremely rare examples of fortified plazuela sites, Spanish colonial-style ranch sites developed in the 1820s and 1830s.

The Quarai were a Tiguex (Southern Tiwa) Pueblo band of American Indians. They were one of several bands of Tiwa speakers that populated the Salinas basin when it was first documented by Spanish explorers in the late 16th century, and were referred to in Spanish documents as the "Cuarac". Based on the archaeology of the site, they are estimated to have settled here around 1300 AD. By the early 17th century the large pueblo compound had been built. Spanish missionaries were received by the Quarai in 1626, and granted permission to build a mission. Named Nuestra Señora de la Purisima Concepción de Quarai, it was completed in 1632. Although the community did well, a severe drought afflicted the region beginning in the late 1660s, which combined with attacks from hostile Apaches to lead to its abandonment in 1675. The Quarai survivors eventually migrated to the Rio Grande valley south of what is now Albuquerque. The site was not reoccupied until the 19th century, when Spanish ranchers Miguel and Juan Lucero arrived in the 1820s. The Luceros used the ruined convento as a sheep pen, and built an irrigation system using elements of stone and brick salvaged from the ruins. Both the church and one their houses were built on top of mounds of prehistoric construction ruins. The Luceros and other local ranchers used the church (which at the time still had its roof) for services led by itinerant preachers. In 1829 they petitioned the Mexican governor for the construction of a new church building. This was granted, but disagreements among the residents and with the authorities led its construction to be halted at an early date; it was built at Manzano instead. The Lucero settlement was abandoned after a major Apache raid in 1830, one of whose effects was the collapse of the church roof.

The ruins were acquired by the state in the 1930s and stabilized. They were operated by the state as a monument until they were taken over by the National Park Service in the 1980s, when the Casa Quiveras National Monument was expanded and renamed the Salinas Pueblo Missions National Monument.

== See also ==
- National Register of Historic Places listings in Torrance County, New Mexico
- List of National Historic Landmarks in New Mexico
