= New Mexico State Road 131 =

State highway in New Mexico, United States

State Road 131
- NM 131 highlighted in red

Route information
- Maintained by NMDOT
- Length: 2.401 mi (3.864 km)

Major junctions
- South end: End of state maintenance near Manzano Mountains State Park entrance
- North end: NM 55 in Manzano

Location
- Country: United States
- State: New Mexico
- Counties: Torrance

Highway system
- New Mexico State Highway System; Interstate; US; State; Scenic
← NM 130	→ NM 132

State Road 131 (NM 131) is a 2.4-mile-long (3.9 km) state highway in the US state of New Mexico. NM 131's southern terminus is at the end of state maintenance near Manzano Mountains State Park entrance, and the northern terminus is at NM 55 in Manzano.

== Major intersections ==
The entire route is in Torrance County.

Location	mi	km	Destinations	Notes
	0.000	0.000	End of state maintenance	Southern terminus near Manzano Mountains State Park entrance
Manzano	2.401	3.864	NM 55	Northern terminus
1.000 mi = 1.609 km; 1.000 km = 0.621 mi
