= National Register of Historic Places listings in Los Alamos County, New Mexico =

Location of Los Alamos County in New Mexico

This is a list of the National Register of Historic Places listings in Los Alamos County, New Mexico.

This is intended to be a complete list of the properties and districts on the National Register of Historic Places in Los Alamos County, New Mexico, United States. Latitude and longitude coordinates are provided for many National Register properties and districts; these locations may be seen together in a map.

There are 13 properties and districts listed on the National Register in the county, including 2 National Historic Landmarks. Eight of these sites are also recorded on the State Register of Cultural Properties.

This National Park Service list is complete through NPS recent listings posted September 26, 2025.

Contents: NRHP in New Mexico by county
Bernalillo – Catron – Chaves – Cibola – Colfax – Curry – De Baca – Doña Ana – Eddy – Grant – Guadalupe – Harding – Hidalgo – Lea – Lincoln – Los Alamos – Luna – McKinley – Mora – Otero – Quay – Rio Arriba – Roosevelt – San Juan – San Miguel – Sandoval – Santa Fe – Sierra – Socorro – Taos – Torrance – Union – Valencia

== Current listings ==
	Name on the Register	Image	Date listed	Location	City or town	Description
1	Bandelier CCC Historic District	Bandelier CCC Historic District	May 28, 1987 (#87001452)	Off State Road 4; 35°46′50″N 106°16′03″W	Bandelier National Monument	State Register of Cultural Properties (SRCP); extends into Sandoval County
2	Bandelier National Monument	Bandelier National Monument	October 15, 1966 (#66000042)	12 miles (19 km) south of Los Alamos on State Road 4; 35°46′32″N 106°19′06″W	Los Alamos	SRCP; extends into Sandoval and Santa Fe Counties; boundary increased 12/10/14
3	Bayo Road		November 7, 2003 (#03001141)	Approximately 420 feet northwest of the junction of Diamond Dr. and San Ildefonso Rd. 35°53′58″N 106°17′51″W	Los Alamos	
4	Chupaderos Canyon Small Structural Site	Chupaderos Canyon Small Structural Site	November 7, 1990 (#90001585)	Address Restricted	Espanola	
5	Chupaderos Mesa Village	Chupaderos Mesa Village	November 7, 1990 (#90001583)	Address Restricted	Espanola	
6	Grant Road		January 14, 2004 (#03001409)	From near junction of Diamond Dr. and San Ildefonso Rd. to near Guaje Pines Cemetery. 35°53′57″N 106°17′54″W	Los Alamos	Historic homestead access route, now a hiking trail. SRCP Trails PDF
7	Guaja Water/Soil Control Site	Guaja Water/Soil Control Site	November 7, 1990 (#90001582)	Address Restricted	Espanola	
8	Guaje Site	Guaje Site	December 7, 1982 (#82001049)	Address Restricted	Los Alamos	SRCP
9	Los Alamos Scientific Laboratory	Los Alamos Scientific Laboratory	October 15, 1966 (#66000893)	Central Ave. 35°52′54″N 106°17′54″W	Los Alamos	
10	Lujan Road		January 12, 2005 (#04001478)	Northeast of the junction of Diamond Dr. and San Ildefonso Rd. 35°53′49″N 106°16′52″W	Los Alamos	SRCP
11	Pajarito Springs Site	Pajarito Springs Site	December 6, 1982 (#82001050)	Address Restricted	White Rock	SRCP
12	United States Post Office-Los Alamos, New Mexico	United States Post Office-Los Alamos, New Mexico	August 3, 2015 (#15000493)	199 Central Park Sq. 35°52′54″N 106°18′04″W	Los Alamos	SRCP
13	White Rock Canyon	White Rock Canyon	May 18, 1990 (#90000717)	North of White Rock; 35°49′39″N 106°12′05″W	White Rock	SRCP

== See also ==
- List of National Historic Landmarks in New Mexico
- National Register of Historic Places listings in New Mexico
