= Rancho Bonito =

- U.S. National Register of Historic Places
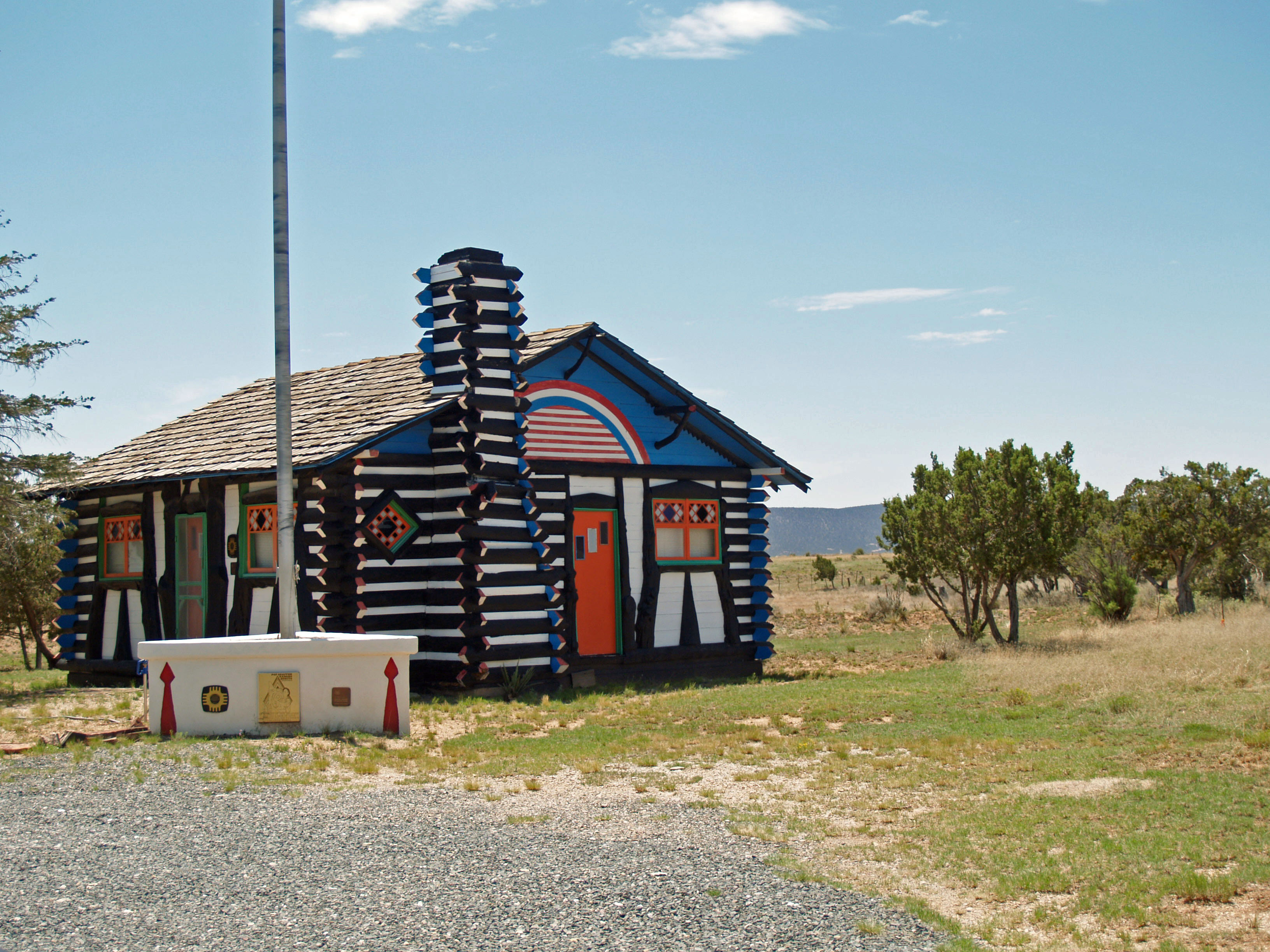

- Location within New Mexico
- Nearest city: Mountainair, New Mexico
- Coordinates: 34°30′23″N 106°14′21″W
- Area: 14 acres (5.7 ha)
- Built: late 1930s
- Built by: Clem Schaffer
- NRHP reference No.: 78001834
- Added to NRHP: November 29, 1978

The Rancho Bonito in Torrance County, New Mexico was listed on the National Register of Historic Places in 1978. The listing included five contributing buildings on 14 acres (5.7 ha).

It is located about .5 miles (0.80 km) south of Mountainair, New Mexico on Gran Quivera Rd. (New Mexico State Road 14).

The five buildings were all built in the late 1930s. The Rancho served as an International Folk Art Museum, consisting of workshop spaces and display area for Clem "Pop" Shaffer's animal art. Cultivation on the Ranch also provided produce for the Shaffer Hotel in Mountainair, which Shaffer built and operated.

The display house closest to the entrance, once a workshop, is a frame 24 by 24 feet (7.3 m × 7.3 m) gable-roofed structure, decorated with cut and brightly painted logs.

It has a log-encased chimney, which looks dangerous.

Shaffer was born in 1880 in Harmony, Indiana. He moved to Mountainair with his new wife in 1908. In his autobiography he wrote: "In 1929 I built a dining room on the hotel also 8 more rooms the dining room is my unusual piece of work." And "Then in 1937 I started to build my tenant a house and barn on the ranch I also built a show house, for my wooden animals. I also built a work shop where I make all my wooden animals."
