= Manzano Mountain Wilderness =

Wilderness area in New Mexico, United States

- IUCN category Ib (wilderness area)
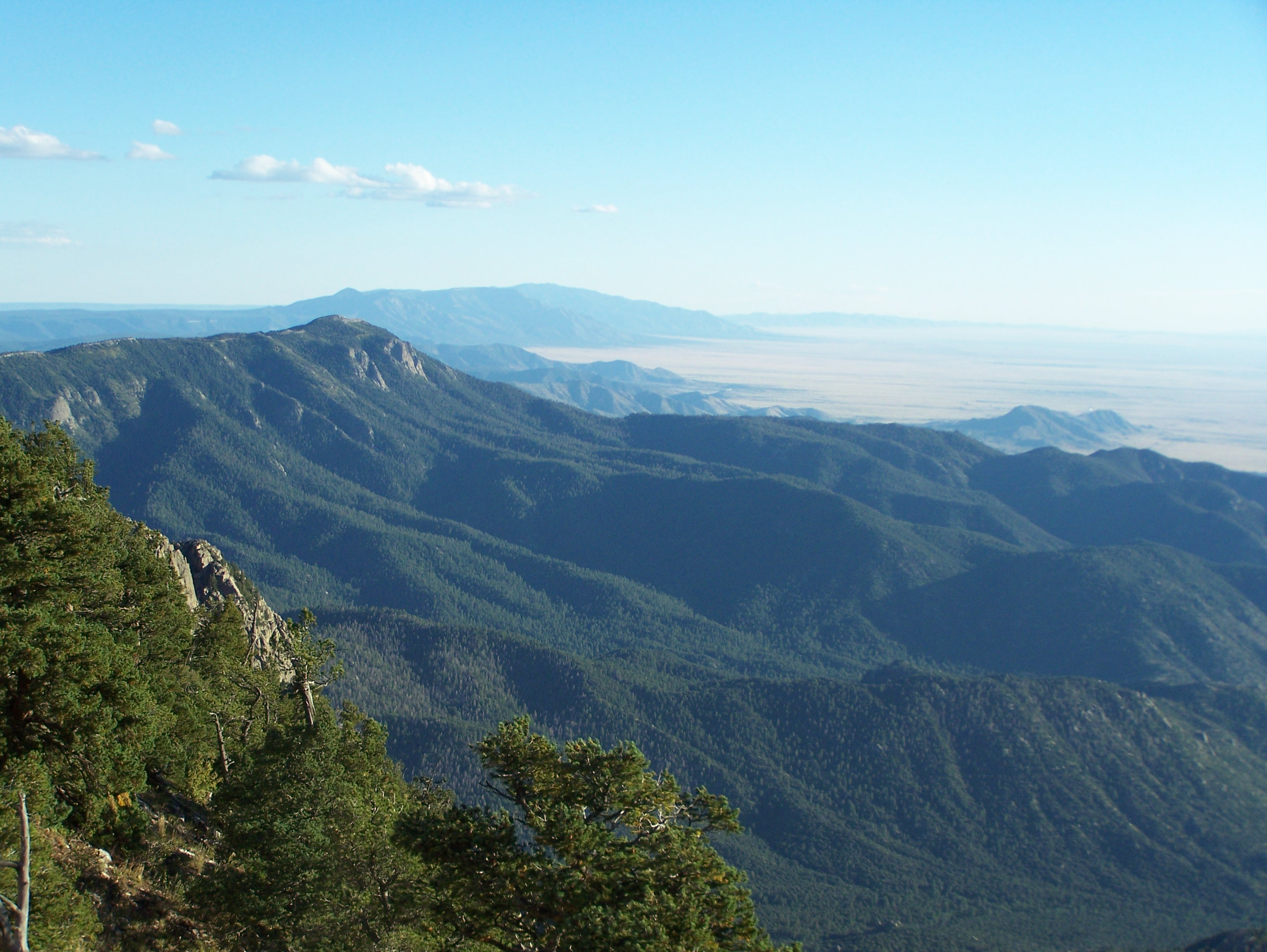
- Manzano Mountains as seen from the north

- Location within the United States
- Location: Torrance and Valencia Counties, New Mexico
- Nearest city: Albuquerque
- Coordinates: 34°41′34″N 106°26′10.4″W
- Area: 36,875 acres (149.23 km^{2})
- Established: 1978
- Governing body: U.S. Forest Service

Manzano Mountain Wilderness is a designated Wilderness Area within the Cibola National Forest, located about 50 miles (80 km) south-southeast of Albuquerque. It is located in western Torrance County and eastern Valencia County. The Wilderness area includes 36,875 acres (14,923 ha) (58 sq. mi) with elevations ranging from 6,100 feet (1,900 m) to 10,098 feet (3,078 m) at Manzano Peak.

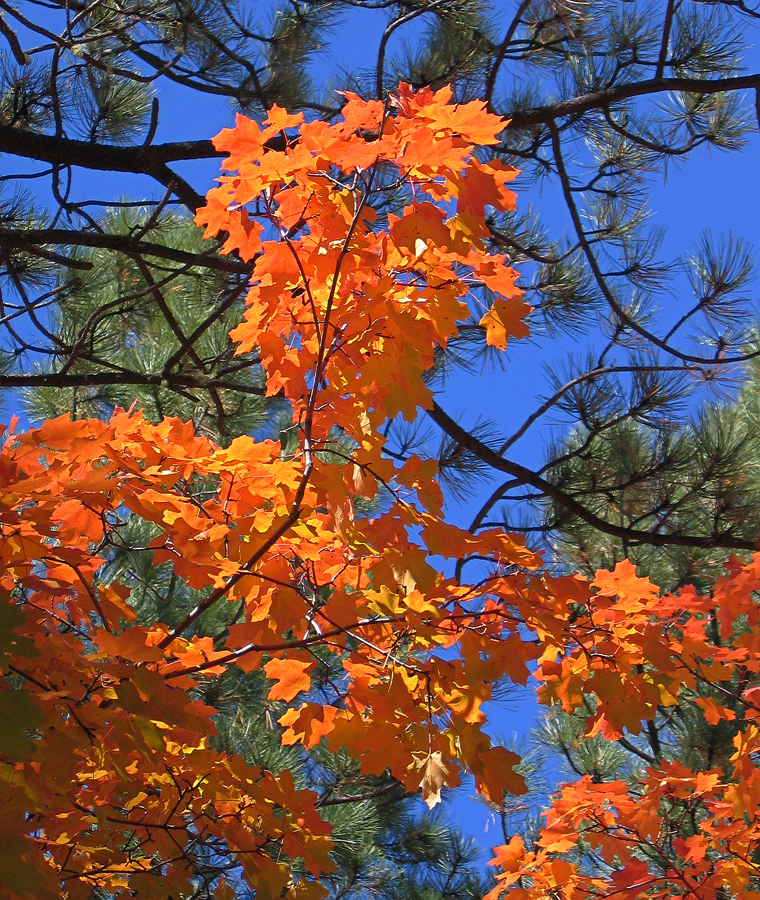
Bigtooth maple in fall, Fourth of July Canyon

== History ==
The Manzano Mountain Wilderness area was created in 1978 as part of the National Wilderness Preservation System. Manzano means "apple" in Spanish. The region received the name when early Spanish settlers discovered ancient apple trees growing a few miles east of the present-day wilderness. The apple trees were, according to legend, planted by Spanish missionaries to the Pueblo Indians in the 17th century.

U.S. Wilderness Areas do not allow motorized or mechanized vehicles, including bicycles. Camping and fishing are allowed with proper permit, but no roads, buildings, logging, or mining are permitted. Wilderness areas within National Forests and Bureau of Land Management areas allow hunting in season.

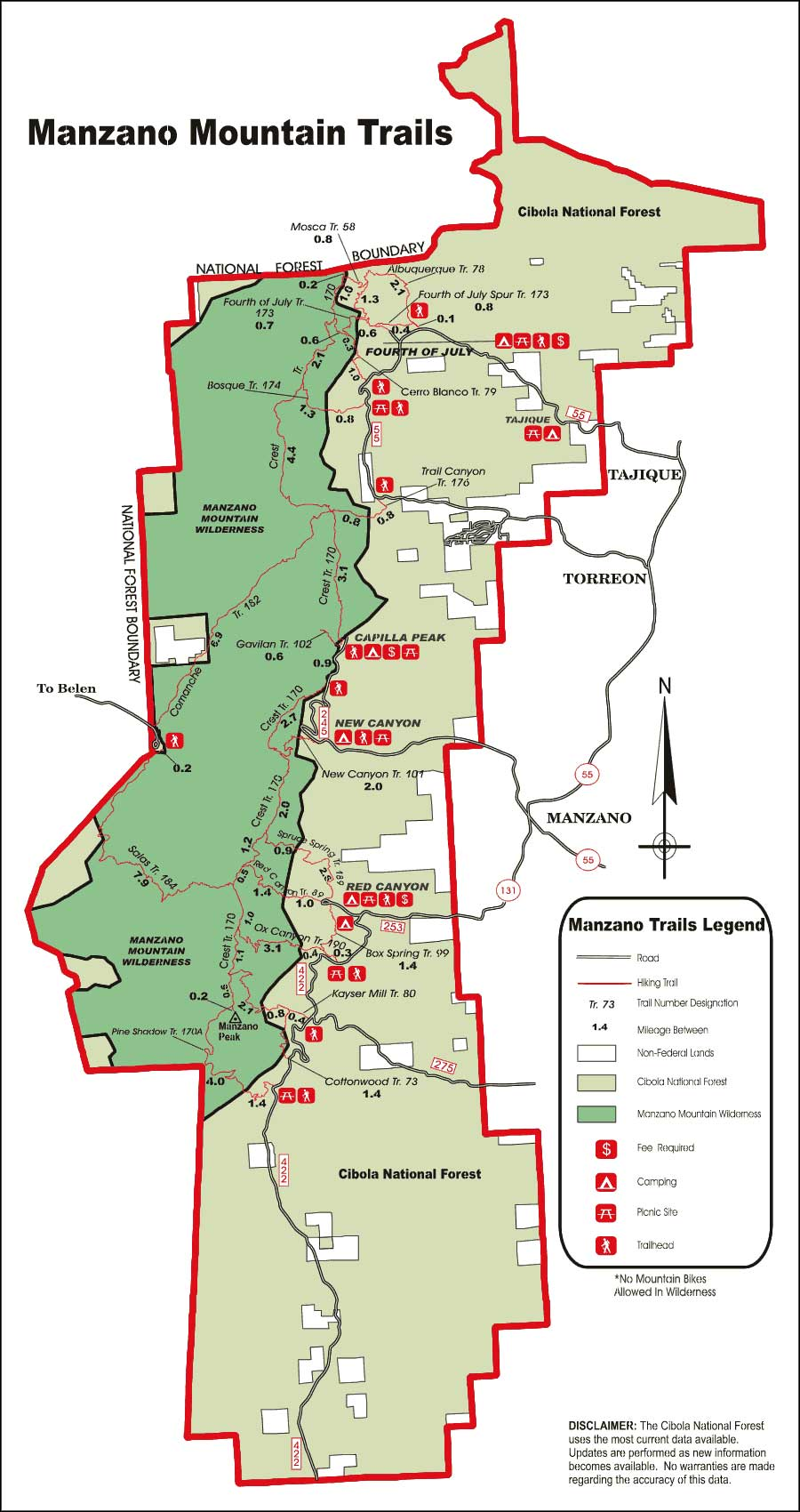
A trail map of the Manzano Wilderness (dark green) and the adjacent Cibola National Forest (light green).

== Topography, Flora, and Fauna ==
Manzano Mountain Wilderness is about 17 miles (28 km) long and 3–5 miles (5–8 km) wide, covering both the eastern and western slopes of the Manzano Mountains which run north-south. The crest of the mountains in the wilderness varies from elevations of 8,200 feet (2,500 m) to 10,098 feet (3,078 m). The Manzano mountains appear low and unimpressive from a distance but up close are rugged, with deep canyons radiating off the crest.

The higher elevations of the Manzano wilderness, above about 8,500 feet (2,600 m), support an aspen and spruce-fir forest. Below that, at elevations of 6,500 feet (2,000 m) to 8,500 feet (2,600 m) feet is a forest dominated by ponderosa pine. At the lowest elevations of the wilderness are pinyon pine-juniper woodlands and grasslands. Bigtooth maple trees are found in several canyons. They put on an impressive show of autumn color in October, especially near Fourth of July campground adjacent to the northern part of the wilderness. Small springs and streams are found in several of the canyons, but water is scarce during dry periods. Animals found in the Manzano are typical of New Mexico: mule deer, elk, black bear, pronghorn, wild turkey, and mountain lion. The wilderness is an important raptor migration corridor which attracts bird watchers and raptor monitors during migration seasons.

Forest fires are frequent in the Manzano mountains. In 2007 and 2008 more than 25,000 acres (10,000 ha) burned in the wilderness and adjacent areas.

== Recreation ==
Sixty-four miles (104 km) of trails are found in the wilderness. The 22 mile (35 km) Crest Trail runs the length of Manzano and is accessed by many shorter trails climbing up canyons from both the east and west side of the mountains. Several trails originating near Fourth of July Campground give access to groves of bigtooth maples. A seven-mile round-trip hike leads to the top of Manzano Peak. The rocky summit has excellent views in all directions.

Near the eastern part of the wilderness is Manzano Mountains State Park and the impressive ruins of Quarai in the Salinas Pueblo Missions National Monument. Quarai was a Pueblo village and the site of a Franciscan Mission station and church in the 17th century. Both the State Park and the National Monument have short trails exploring the foothills.
