= Manzano Mountains State Park =

State park in New Mexico, United States

- Location within New Mexico
- Location: Torrance County, New Mexico, United States
- Coordinates: 34°36′12″N 106°21′39″W
- Area: 160 acres (65 ha)
- Elevation: 7,250 ft (2,210 m)
- Established: 1973
- Administrator: New Mexico Energy, Minerals and Natural Resources Department
- Website: Official website

Manzano Mountains State Park is a state park of New Mexico, United States, located 16 miles (26 km) north of Mountainair on the eastern slope of the Manzano Mountains. The park offers opportunities for camping, bird-watching, hiking, and photography.

== History ==
The park's 160 acres plus easement rights for an access road were purchased from the Candelaria family for $32,000 in 1973.

== Geology ==
The Manzano Mountains are a part of the same geological feature that formed the less remote and more developed Sandia Mountains to the north.
