= National Register of Historic Places listings in New Mexico =

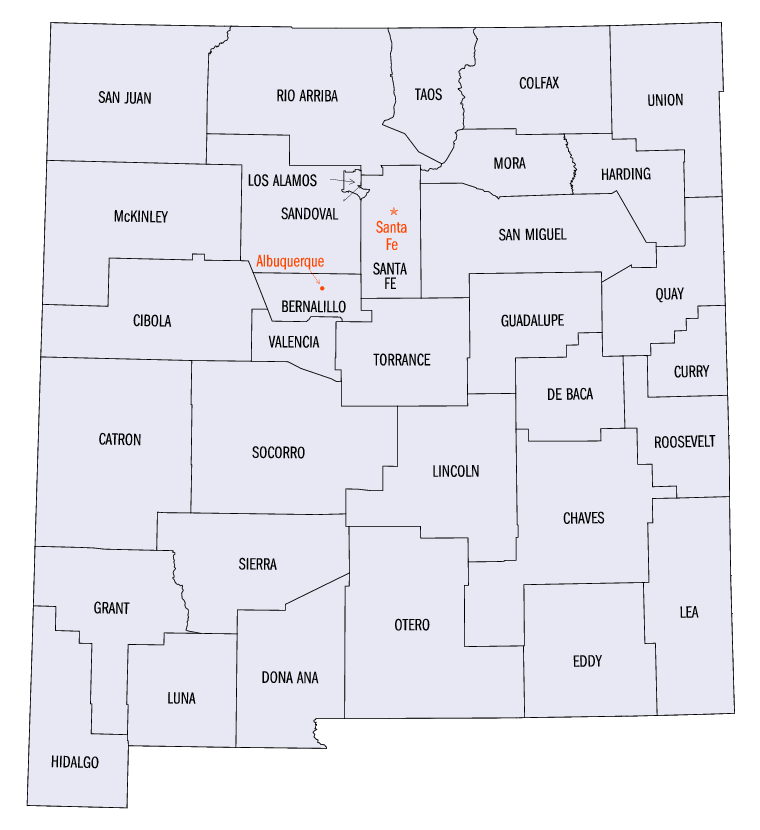

This is a list of properties and districts in New Mexico that are on the National Register of Historic Places. There are more than 1,100 listings. Of these, 46 are National Historic Landmarks. There are listings in each of the state's 33 counties.

The tables linked below are intended to provide a complete list of properties and districts listed in each county. The locations of National Register properties and districts with latitude and longitude data may be seen in an online map by clicking on "Map of all coordinates". (Note: The latitude and longitude information provided in this table was derived originally from the National Register Information System, which has been found to be fairly accurate for about 99% of listings. Some locations in this table may have been corrected to current GPS standards.)

The names on the lists are as they were entered into the National Register; some place names are uncommon or have changed since being added to the National Register.

This National Park Service list is complete through NPS recent listings posted November 6, 2026.

== Current listings by county ==
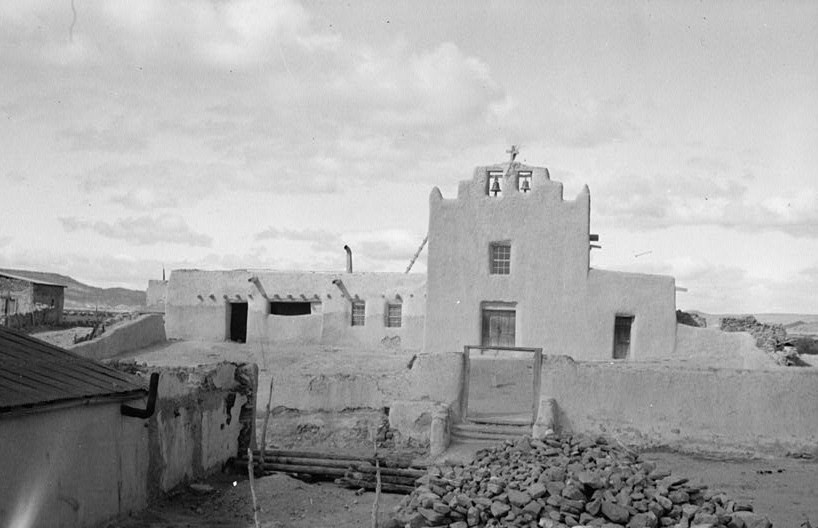
Laguna Pueblo Valencia County

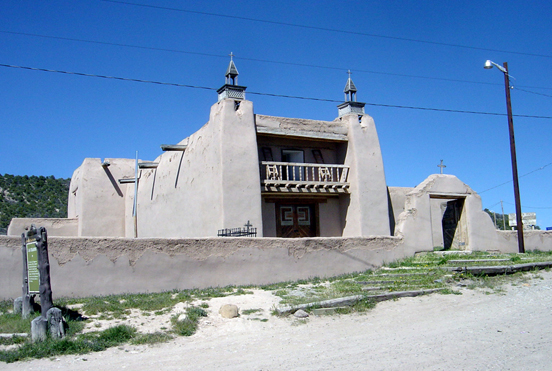
Las Trampas Historic District Taos County

	County	# of Sites	# of NHLs
1	Bernalillo	166	1
2	Catron	11	0
3	Chaves	21	0
4	Cibola	19	3
5	Colfax	30	2
6	Curry	12	0
7	De Baca	5	0
8	Doña Ana	35	2
9	Eddy	32	1
10	Grant	45	1
11	Guadalupe	10	0
12	Harding	2	0
13	Hidalgo	25	0
14	Lea	6	0
15	Lincoln	35	1
16	Los Alamos	13	2
17	Luna	8	1
18	McKinley	77	2
19	Mora	23	2
20	Otero	32	0
21	Quay	13	0
22	Rio Arriba	117	4
23	Roosevelt	7	1
24	San Juan	38	0
25	San Miguel	104	1
26	Sandoval	63	5
27	Santa Fe	99	8
28	Sierra	33	0
29	Socorro	55	1
30	Taos	43	7
31	Torrance	11	2
32	Union	11	1
33	Valencia	12	0
Duplicates		(12) (Note: Bandelier CCC Historic District in Los Alamos and Sandoval counties; Bandelier National Monument in Los Alamos, Sandoval, and Santa Fe Counties; Crow Canyon Archaeological District in San Juan and Rio Arriba Counties; Elephant Butte Irrigation District in Dona Ana and Sierra Counties; Gran Quivera Historic District in Socorro and Torrance counties; Puye Ruins in Rio Arriba and Sandoval counties; Route 66, State maintained from Montoya to Cuervo in Guadalupe and Quay counties; Posi-ouinge in Rio Arriba and Taos counties; Salinas Pueblo Missions National Monument in Socorro and Torrance counties; Tipton-Black Willow Ranch Historic District in Mora and San Miguel counties; and Zuni-Cibola Complex in Cibola and McKinley counties.)	(3) (Note: Bandelier CCC Historic District in Los Alamos and Sandoval counties; Puye Ruins in Rio Arriba and Sandoval counties; and Zuni-Cibola Complex in Cibola and McKinley counties.)
TOTAL		1,201	45

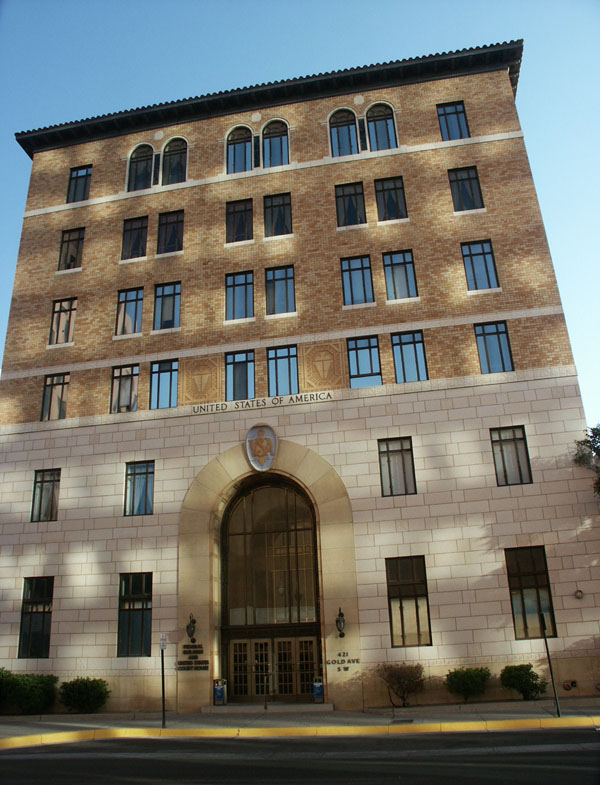
Federal Building and U.S. Courthouse (Albuquerque) Bernalillo County

== See also ==
- List of National Historic Landmarks in New Mexico
- List of bridges on the National Register of Historic Places in New Mexico
- New Mexico State Register of Cultural Properties
