= Punta de Agua, New Mexico =

- Census-designated place
- Location within New Mexico Location within the United States
- Coordinates: 34°36′06″N 106°17′32″W
- Country: United States
- State: New Mexico
- County: Torrance

Area
  - Total: 1.38 sq mi (3.58 km^{2})
  - Land: 1.38 sq mi (3.58 km^{2})
  - Water: 0 sq mi (0.00 km^{2})
- Elevation: 6,716 ft (2,047 m)

Population (2020)
  - Total: 68
  - Density: 49.2/sq mi (19.01/km^{2})
- Time zone: UTC-7 (Mountain (MST))
  - Summer (DST): UTC-6 (MDT)
- ZIP Code: 87036 (Mountainair)
- Area code: 505
- FIPS code: 35-60310
- GNIS feature ID: 2806786

Punta de Agua is an unincorporated community and census-designated place (CDP) in Torrance County, New Mexico, United States. It was first listed as a CDP prior to the 2020 census. As of the 2020 census, Punta de Agua had a population of 68.

The CDP is in the western part of the county, 7 miles (11 km) northwest of Mountainair along New Mexico State Road 55, which continues northwest 5 miles (8 km) to Manzano. The Quarai unit of Salinas Pueblo Missions National Monument is in the southwest part of the CDP.

== Demographics ==
Historical population
Census	Pop.	Note	%±
2020	68		—
U.S. Decennial Census

== Education ==
Its school district is Mountainair Public Schools.
