= Torreon, Torrance County, New Mexico =

Census-designated place in Torrance County, New Mexico, United States

Torreon, New Mexico
- CDP
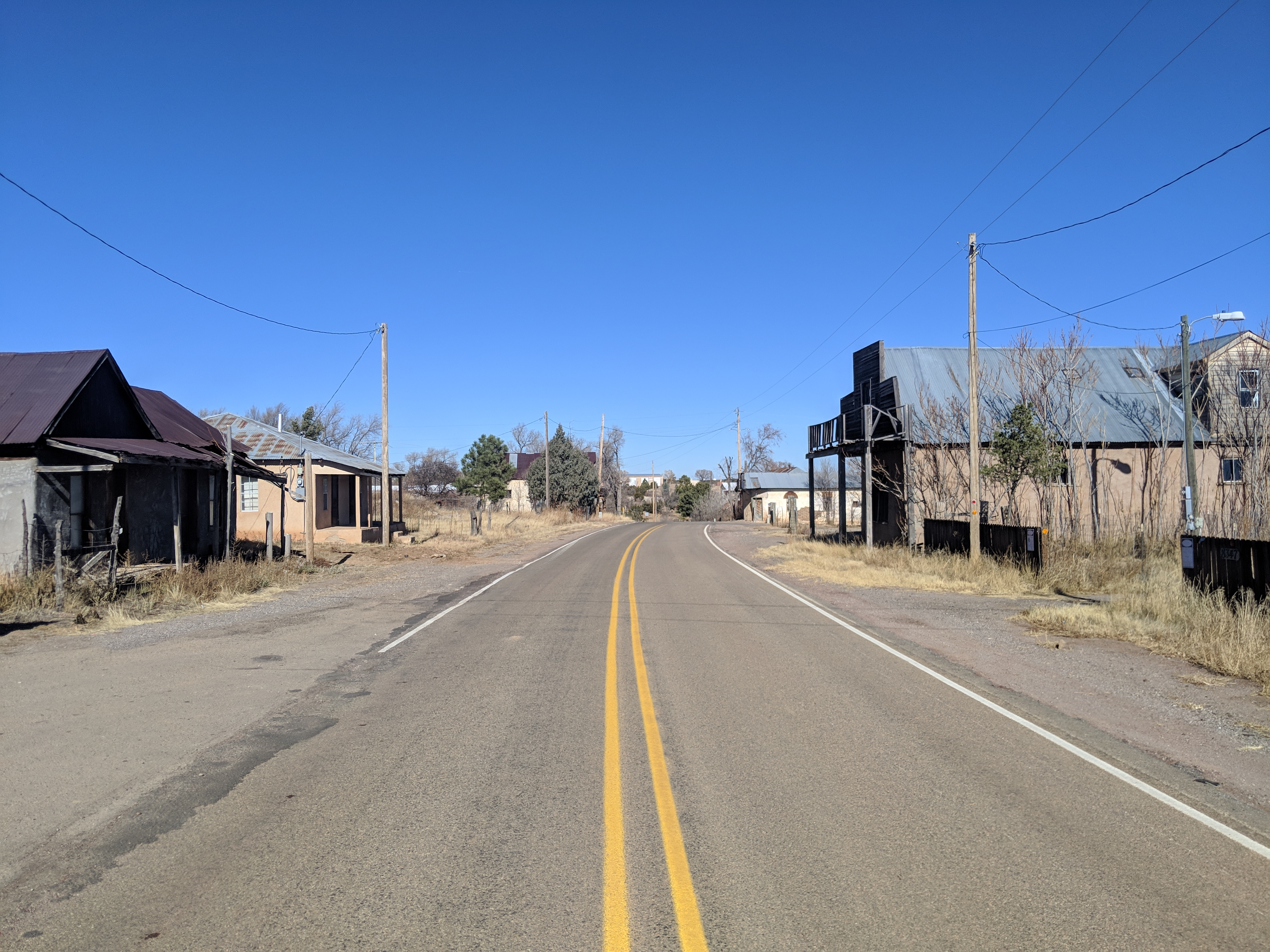
- New Mexico State Road 55

- Location of Torreon in Torrance County, New Mexico

- Location in the United States
- Coordinates: 34°43′27″N 106°18′03″W
- Country: United States
- State: New Mexico
- Elevation: 6,700 ft (2,000 m)
- Time zone: Mountain (MST)
- GNIS feature ID: 2409339

Torreon is a farming community and census-designated place (CDP) in Torrance County, New Mexico, United States. The population was 244 at the 2000 census. It is part of the Albuquerque Metropolitan Statistical Area.

== Geography ==
Torreon is located on NM State Route 55 on the eastern slopes of the Manzano Mountains.

According to the United States Census Bureau, the CDP has a total area of 8.3 square miles (21.5 km^{2}), all land.

== History ==
Torreon is built on the site of an old Piro pueblo one of the more northern of the Salinas pueblos. The Piro site was occupied prior to the arrival of the Spanish in the 16th century, but became part of the Salinas District, a group of mission towns on the east side of the Manzano Mountains. As the Apache moved south along the edge of the Rocky Mountains in the mid-17th century these missions had to become more defensible. However, by 1677 the Torreon site had been abandoned.

Torreon was resettled in the Spring of 1841 by Nino Antonio Montoya and twenty-six other farmers under a grant from the Prefect of the Central District of New Mexico. The Torreon Grant was named after the defensive towers built at Manzano 6.6 miles to the south, and consisted of an area approximately three miles east–west by six miles north–south. Apache raids remained a serious problem until after the Civil War and the appointment of Edward Hatch as New Mexico Military District commander.

== Demographics ==
As of the census of 2000, there were 244 people, 93 households, and 66 families residing in the CDP. The population density was 29.3 inhabitants per square mile (11.3/km^{2}). There were 139 housing units at an average density of 16.7 per square mile (6.5/km^{2}). The racial makeup of the CDP was 73.77% White, 0.41% Native American, 0.82% Asian, 1.23% Pacific Islander, 18.85% from other races, and 4.92% from two or more races. Hispanic or Latino of any race were 68.85% of the population.

There were 93 households, out of which 30.1% had children under the age of 18 living with them, 55.9% were married couples living together, 7.5% had a female householder with no husband present, and 29.0% were non-families. 26.9% of all households were made up of individuals, and 10.8% had someone living alone who was 65 years of age or older. The average household size was 2.62 and the average family size was 3.23.

In the CDP, the population was spread out, with 25.0% under the age of 18, 9.0% from 18 to 24, 20.1% from 25 to 44, 32.0% from 45 to 64, and 13.9% who were 65 years of age or older. The median age was 40 years. For every 100 females, there were 106.8 males. For every 100 females age 18 and over, there were 101.1 males.

The median income for a household in the CDP was $36,250, and the median income for a family was $45,750. Males had a median income of $35,375 versus $12,188 for females. The per capita income for the CDP was $12,349. About 12.9% of families and 10.9% of the population were below the poverty line, including 13.4% of those under the age of eighteen and none of those 65 or over.

== See also ==
- List of census-designated places in New Mexico
