= Cedarvale, New Mexico =

- Unincorporated community
- Location within New Mexico
- Coordinates: 34°22′14″N 105°42′07″W
- Country: United States
- State: New Mexico
- County: Torrance
- Elevation: 6,384 ft (1,946 m)
- Time zone: UTC-7 (Mountain (MST))
  - Summer (DST): UTC-6 (MDT)
- ZIP code: 87009
- Area code: 505
- GNIS feature ID: 918127

Cedarvale is an unincorporated community in Torrance County, New Mexico, United States. Cedarvale is located on New Mexico State Road 42, 10.2 miles (16.4 km) northwest of Corona. Cedarvale had a post office until it closed on May 15, 1990; it still has its own ZIP code, 87009.
