= Estancia Municipal Schools =

School district in New Mexico, United States

Estancia Municipal School District, or Estancia Municipal Schools, is a school district headquartered in Estancia, New Mexico.

The district includes Estancia, Tajique, Torreon, Willard, and a portion of McIntosh. It also includes the unincorporated areas of Chilili and Lucy.

== History ==
In 2000 Estancia High was placed on the New Mexico list of strongly improving schools.

Joel Shirley served as superintendent until July 2019, when Cindy Sims took his position.

== Schools ==
- Estancia High School (grades 9-12)
- Estancia Middle School (7-8)
- Upper Elementary School (4-6)
- Lower Elementary School (1-3)
- Van Stone Elementary School (preschool and kindergarten)
- Estancia Valley Learning Center (what the district refers to as "life skills" students)
