= Gran Quivera Historic District =

- U.S. National Register of Historic Places
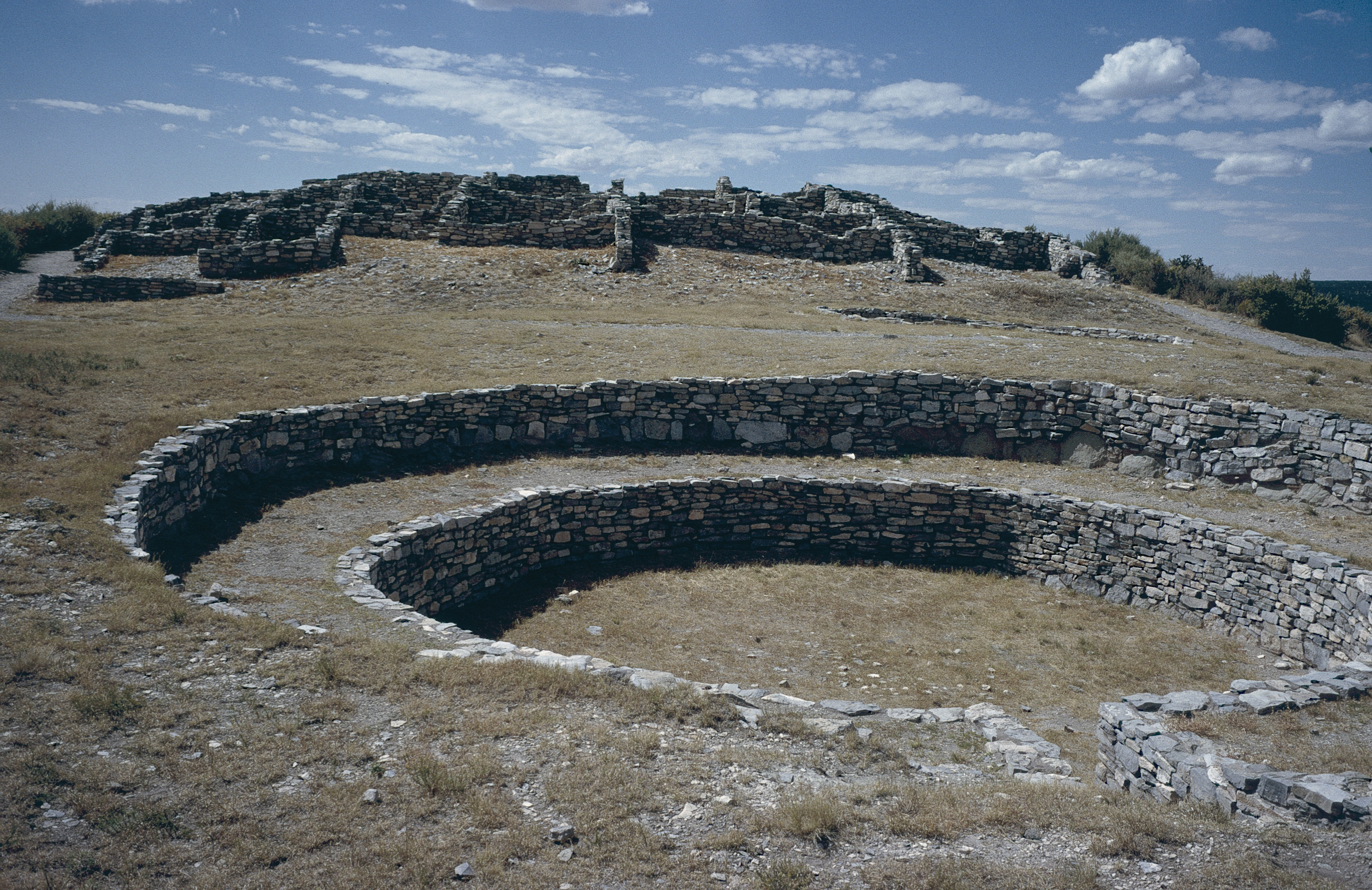

- Location within New Mexico
- Location: Along NM 55 approx. 25 mi. south of Mountainair, New Mexico
- Coordinates: 34°15′55″N 106°06′09″W
- NRHP reference No.: 15000355
- Added to NRHP: June 15, 2015

Gran Quivera Historic District is a historic district which was listed on the National Register of Historic Places in 2015.

It is within Salinas Pueblo Missions National Monument, and lies in both Socorro County, New Mexico and Torrance County, New Mexico.

Without the National Register nomination document, it is unclear whether the listing is for the Gran Quivira ruins (in which case the listing would be somewhat redundant) or for historic 20th century structures such as a visitors center at the site (like how National Park Service structures are themselves recognized as historic sites at various national parks).
