= List of National Historic Landmarks in New Mexico =

This is a complete List of National Historic Landmarks in New Mexico. New Mexico has 47 National Historic Landmarks (NHLs), including Raton Pass which is shared with Colorado, and listed by the National Park Service as in that state.

== Key ==
	National Historic Landmark
^{†}	National Historic Landmark District
^{#}	National Historic Site, National Historical Park, National Memorial, or National Monument
^{*}	Delisted Landmark

== Existing NHLs ==
The NHLs are distributed across 22 of New Mexico's 33 counties.

	Landmark name	Image	Date designated	Location	County	Description
1	Abó	Abó	June 13, 1962 (#66000497)	Abo; 34°26′56″N 106°22′17″W	Torrance	Pueblo ruins, and ruins of a Spanish mission, Salinas Pueblo Missions National Monument
2^{†}	Acoma Pueblo	Acoma Pueblo	October 9, 1960 (#66000500)	Acoma Pueblo; 34°53′47″N 107°34′55″W	Cibola	Native American pueblo built atop a 225-foot sandstone mesa; one of longest-occupied places in North America
3^{†}	Bandelier CCC Historic District	Bandelier CCC Historic District	May 28, 1987 (#87001452)	Bandelier National Monument; 35°46′46″N 106°16′13″W	Los Alamos and Sandoval	Civilian Conservation Corps buildings and infrastructure
4^{†}	Barrio De Analco Historic District	Barrio De Analco Historic District	October 18, 1968 (#68000032)	Santa Fe; 35°41′00″N 105°56′11″W	Santa Fe	Historic district including the oldest house in the state of New Mexico, and the oldest Catholic church in the continental United States (Oldest Churches, Annexed Territories vs original founding Colony States).
5	Big Bead Mesa		July 19, 1964 (#66000958)	Casa Salazar	Sandoval	Fortified Navajo village site; served as a base for trade and raiding from 1745 to 1812
6^{†}	Blackwater Draw	Blackwater Draw	January 20, 1961 (#66000483)	Clovis; 34°16′40″N 103°19′28″W	Roosevelt	Archaeological type site of the Clovis culture
7	Ernest L. Blumenschein House	Ernest L. Blumenschein House	December 21, 1965 (#66000495)	Taos; 36°24′21″N 105°34′37″W	Taos	Home of painter Ernest L. Blumenschein, co-founder of Taos Art Colony
8^{†}	Carlsbad Irrigation District	Carlsbad Irrigation District	July 19, 1964 (#66000476)	Carlsbad; 32°29′27″N 104°15′08″W	Eddy	Early 20th-century water reclamation project
9	Kit Carson House	Kit Carson House	May 23, 1963 (#66000948)	Taos; 36°24′19″N 105°34′20″W	Taos	Home of frontiersman Kit Carson
10^{†}	Denver & Rio Grande Railroad San Juan Extension (Cumbres & Toltec Scenic Railroad)	Denver & Rio Grande Railroad San Juan Extension	October 16, 2012 (#73000462)	Antonito, CO and Chama, NM; 36°59′04″N 106°18′20″W	Archuleta, CO, Conejos, CO, and Rio Arriba, NM	Longest and most complete representation of late nineteenth- and early twentieth-century railroading.
11	El Santuario de Chimayó	El Santuario de Chimayó	April 15, 1970 (#70000412)	Chimayo; 35°59′21″N 105°55′54″W	Santa Fe	Roman Catholic church, famous for the story of its founding and as a contemporary pilgrimage site
12	Folsom Site	Folsom Site	January 20, 1961 (#66000473)	Folsom; 36°52′54″N 104°04′16″W	Colfax	Archaeological site; type site for the Folsom tradition
13^{†}	Fort Bayard Site	Fort Bayard Site	March 19, 2004 (#02000726)	Santa Clara; 32°47′47″N 108°08′56″W	Grant	Site of an 1866 post of Buffalo Soldiers
14	Glorieta Pass Battlefield	Glorieta Pass Battlefield	November 5, 1961 (#66000486)	Pecos; 35°33′36″N 105°47′08″W	Santa Fe	Site of American Civil War Battle of Glorieta Pass
15	Hawikuh	Hawikuh	October 9, 1960 (#66000502)	Zuni; 34°56′18″N 108°59′57″W	Cibola	Largest of the Zuni pueblos; founded in the 13th century
16	Peter Hurd and Henriette Wyeth House and Studios	Peter Hurd and Henriette Wyeth House and Studios	December 13, 2024 (#100011368)	129 La Mancha Ln. 33°24′13″N 105°19′47″W	Lincoln	
17^{†}	Las Trampas Historic District	Las Trampas Historic District	May 28, 1967 (#67000007)	Las Trampas; 36°07′51″N 105°45′48″W	Taos	Founded in 1751 by twelve Spanish families from Santa Fe; known for the church of San José de Gracia
18^{†}	Lincoln Historic District	Lincoln Historic District	December 19, 1960 (#66000477)	Lincoln; 33°29′41″N 105°22′56″W	Lincoln	Well-preserved cow town, site of Billy the Kid's escape.
19^{†}	Los Alamos Scientific Laboratory	Los Alamos Scientific Laboratory	December 21, 1965 (#66000893)	Los Alamos; 35°52′32″N 106°19′27″W	Los Alamos	United States Department of Energy (DOE) national laboratory; major site of the Manhattan Project
20	Mabel Dodge Luhan House	Mabel Dodge Luhan House	December 4, 1991 (#78001832)	Taos; 36°24′29″N 105°33′52″W	Taos	Artists' haven of Mabel Dodge Luhan, now an inn
21	Manuelito Complex	Manuelito Complex	July 19, 1964 (#66000894)	Manuelito	McKinley	Major post-Chaco culture sites
22^{†}	Mesilla Plaza	Mesilla Plaza	July 4, 1961 (#82003323)	Mesilla; 32°16′28″N 106°47′44″W	Doña Ana	Town center historically associated with US acquisition of New Mexico
23	National Park Service Region III Office	National Park Service Region III Office	May 28, 1987 (#70000067)	Santa Fe; 35°39′54″N 105°55′21″W	Santa Fe	Masterpiece of Spanish/Pueblo revival architecture
24	Georgia O'Keeffe Home and Studio	Georgia O'Keeffe Home and Studio	August 5, 1998 (#98001197)	Abiquiu; 36°12′22″N 106°19′01″W	Rio Arriba	Home and studio of artist Georgia O'Keeffe
25	Palace of the Governors	Palace of the Governors	October 9, 1960 (#66000489)	Santa Fe; 35°41′09″N 105°56′15″W	Santa Fe	Adobe structure; construction began in 1610; served as the seat of government in New Mexico for centuries; oldest continuously occupied public building in the United States
26^{#}	Pecos Pueblo	Pecos Pueblo	October 9, 1960 (#66000485)	Pecos; 35°33′00″N 105°41′22″W	San Miguel	Large pueblo abandoned in 19th century; in Pecos National Historical Park
27	Puye Ruins	Puye Ruins	May 23, 1966 (#66000481)	Espanola; 35°58′32″N 106°13′39″W	Rio Arriba and Sandoval	Ancestral Puebloan cliff dwellings
28	Ernie Pyle House	Ernie Pyle House	September 20, 2006 (#97001103)	Albuquerque; 35°04′13″N 106°36′45″W	Bernalillo	Former home of famed war correspondent Ernie Pyle
29^{†}	Quarai	Quarai	June 13, 1962 (#66000498)	Manzano; 34°35′45″N 106°17′42″W	Torrance	Pueblo and Spanish mission ruins; part of Salinas Pueblo Missions National Monument
30^{†}	Rabbit Ears	Rabbit Ears	May 23, 1963 (#66000499)	Clayton; 36°35′32″N 103°13′28″W	Union	Twin mountain peaks that were landmarks to wagon trains on Santa Fe Trail
31	Ratón Pass	Ratón Pass	December 19, 1960 (#66000474)	Raton, NM and Trinidad, CO; 36°59′28″N 104°29′12″W	Colfax	Mountain pass on the Santa Fe Trail along the Colorado-New Mexico border. Extends into Las Animas County, Colorado.
32	San Estevan del Rey Mission Church	San Estevan del Rey Mission Church	April 15, 1970 (#70000417)	Acoma; 34°53′42″N 107°34′57″W	Cibola	Church founded in 1629
33	San Francisco de Asís Mission Church	San Francisco de Asís Mission Church	April 15, 1970 (#70000416)	Ranchos de Taos; 36°21′31″N 105°36′28″W	Taos	Mission church on Ranchos de Taos Plaza
34	San Gabriel de Yungue-Ouinge	San Gabriel de Yungue-Ouinge	July 19, 1964 (#66000482)	Ohkay Owingeh; 36°03′26″N 106°05′01″W	Rio Arriba	Site of the first Spanish capital of New Mexico
35	San José de Gracia Church	San José de Gracia Church	April 15, 1970 (#70000415)	Las Trampas; 36°07′53″N 105°45′28″W	Taos	Built between 1760 and 1776; model of the adobe architecture; once used by Los Hermanos Penitentes
36	San José de los Jémez Mission and Gíusewa Pueblo Site	San José de los Jémez Mission and Gíusewa Pueblo Site	October 16, 2012 (#73001147)	Jemez Springs; 35°46′42″N 106°41′11″W	Sandoval	
37	San Lazaro		July 19, 1964 (#66000490)	Santa Fe	Santa Fe	
38	Sandia Cave	Sandia Cave	January 20, 1961 (#66000487)	Bernalillo; 35°15′08″N 106°24′27″W	Sandoval	Cave in which prehistoric artifacts were found and excavated in the 1930s. Accessible via a USFS hiking trail.
39	Santa Fe Plaza	Santa Fe Plaza	December 19, 1960 (#66000491)	Santa Fe; 35°41′07″N 105°56′15″W	Santa Fe	Central park lined with grass, trees, and benches; Indian War Memorial monument; performing arts stage
40^{†}	Seton Village	Seton Village	December 21, 1965 (#66000492)	Santa Fe; 35°35′56″N 105°55′54″W	Santa Fe	
41^{†}	Taos Pueblo	Taos Pueblo	October 9, 1960 (#66000496)	Taos; 36°26′21″N 105°32′44″W	Taos	This ancient pueblo belongs to a Northern Tiwa speaking Native American tribe of Pueblo people. Being approximately 1000 years old, it is believed to be the oldest continuously inhabited building in North America. It is a multi-storied residential complex of reddish-brown adobe divided into two parts by the Rio Pueblo de Taos.
42^{†}	Trinity Site	Trinity Site	December 21, 1965 (#66000493)	Bingham; 33°40′38″N 106°28′31″W	Socorro	Site of the first nuclear weapon detonation.
43^{†}	Village of Columbus and Camp Furlong	Village of Columbus and Camp Furlong	May 15, 1975 (#75001164)	Columbus; 31°49′39″N 107°37′50″W	Luna	Site of March 9, 1916 raid by Pancho Villa that had wide impacts
44	Wagon Mound	Wagon Mound	May 23, 1963 (#66000478)	Wagon Mound; 36°00′01″N 104°41′41″W	Mora	Landmark on the Santa Fe Trail
45^{†}	Watrous (La Junta)	Watrous (La Junta)	May 23, 1963 (#66000480)	Watrous; 35°48′03″N 105°00′05″W	Mora	Mountain and Cimarron Cutoff routes of Santa Fe Trail joined here
46	White Sands V-2 Launching Site	White Sands V-2 Launching Site	October 3, 1985 (#85003541)	White Sands Missile Range; 32°23′58″N 106°22′40″W	Doña Ana	
47^{†}	Zuni-Cibola Complex		December 2, 1974 (#74002267)	Zuni Pueblo; 34°56′17″N 108°59′56″W	Cibola and McKinley	Complex of prehistoric and historic archaeological sites on Zuni Reservation

== Historic areas of the NPS in New Mexico ==
National Historical Parks, some National Monuments, and certain other areas listed in the National Park system are historic landmarks of national importance that are highly protected already, often before the inauguration of the NHL program in 1960, and are then often not also named NHLs per se. There are nine of these in New Mexico. The National Park Service lists these fourteen together with the NHLs in the state.

	Landmark name	Image	Date established	Location	County	Description
1	Aztec Ruins National Monument	West walls of the ruins	January 24, 1923	Aztec	San Juan	Preserves ancestral Pueblo structures in north-western New Mexico
2	Bandelier National Monument	Cliff dwellings at Bandelier	February 11, 1916	Santa Fe	Sandoval and Los Alamos	Includes Frijoles Canyon; contains (restored) ruins of dwellings, kivas, rock paintings and petroglyphs
3	Chaco Culture National Historical Park	Casa Rinconada, one of the Chacoan Great Houses.	March 11, 1907	Farmington	San Juan and McKinley	Densest and most exceptional concentration of pueblos in the American Southwest
4	El Morro National Monument		December 8, 1906	Ramah	Cibola	Sandstone promontory with a pool of water at its base; shaded oasis in the western U.S. deser; Zuni Indians call it "A'ts'ina" (Place of writings on the rock); Anglo-Americans called it "Inscription Rock"; travelers left signatures, names, dates, and stories of their treks
5	Fort Union National Monument	Fort Union ruins	April 5, 1956	Las Vegas, NM	Mora	Preserves the second of three forts constructed on the site beginning in 1851; also ruins of the third; visible network of ruts from the old Santa Fe Trail
6	Gila Cliff Dwellings National Monument	Looking out from one of the cave dwellings	November 16, 1907	Silver City	Catron	Cliff dwellings from the 1280s through the early 1300s
7	Pecos National Historical Park	Pecos pueblo and mission church	June 28, 1965	Santa Fe	Santa Fe and San Miguel	Includes parts of Glorieta Pass Battlefield, an NHL, as well as a mission and other areas.
8	Petroglyph National Monument	Petroglyphs on a large rock at Petroglyph National Monument	June 27, 1990	Albuquerque	Bernalillo	Variety of cultural and natural resources including five volcanic cones, hundreds of archeological sites and an estimated 25,000 images carved by native peoples and early Spanish settlers
9	Salinas Pueblo Missions National Monument	Salinas Pueblo ruinsCourtesy National Park Service	November 1, 1909	Albuquerque	Torrance and Socorro	Reminders of this earliest contact between Pueblo Indians and Spanish Colonials: the ruins of four mission churches and the partially excavated pueblo of Las Humanas

== See also ==
- List of Registered Historic Places in New Mexico
- List of National Historic Landmarks by state
- List of National Natural Landmarks in New Mexico
