= McIntosh, New Mexico =

- Census-designated place
- Location within New Mexico
- Coordinates: 34°51′53″N 106°03′26″W
- Country: United States
- State: New Mexico
- County: Torrance

Area
  - Total: 23.29 sq mi (60.32 km^{2})
  - Land: 23.29 sq mi (60.32 km^{2})
  - Water: 0 sq mi (0.00 km^{2})
- Elevation: 6,162 ft (1,878 m)

Population (2020)
  - Total: 1,395
  - Density: 59.9/sq mi (23.13/km^{2})
- Time zone: UTC-7 (Mountain (MST))
  - Summer (DST): UTC-6 (MDT)
- ZIP code: 87032
- Area code: 505
- GNIS feature ID: 2629118

McIntosh is a census-designated place in Torrance County, New Mexico, United States. As of the 2020 census, McIntosh had a population of 1,395. McIntosh has a post office with ZIP code 87032, which opened on August 28, 1906. New Mexico State Road 41 passes through the community.

== Demographics ==
Historical population
Census	Pop.	Note	%±
2020	1,395		—
U.S. Decennial Census

== Education ==
A portion is in the Moriarty-Edgewood School District while the other is in Estancia Municipal Schools.
