= Mountainair Public Schools =

School district in New Mexico, United States

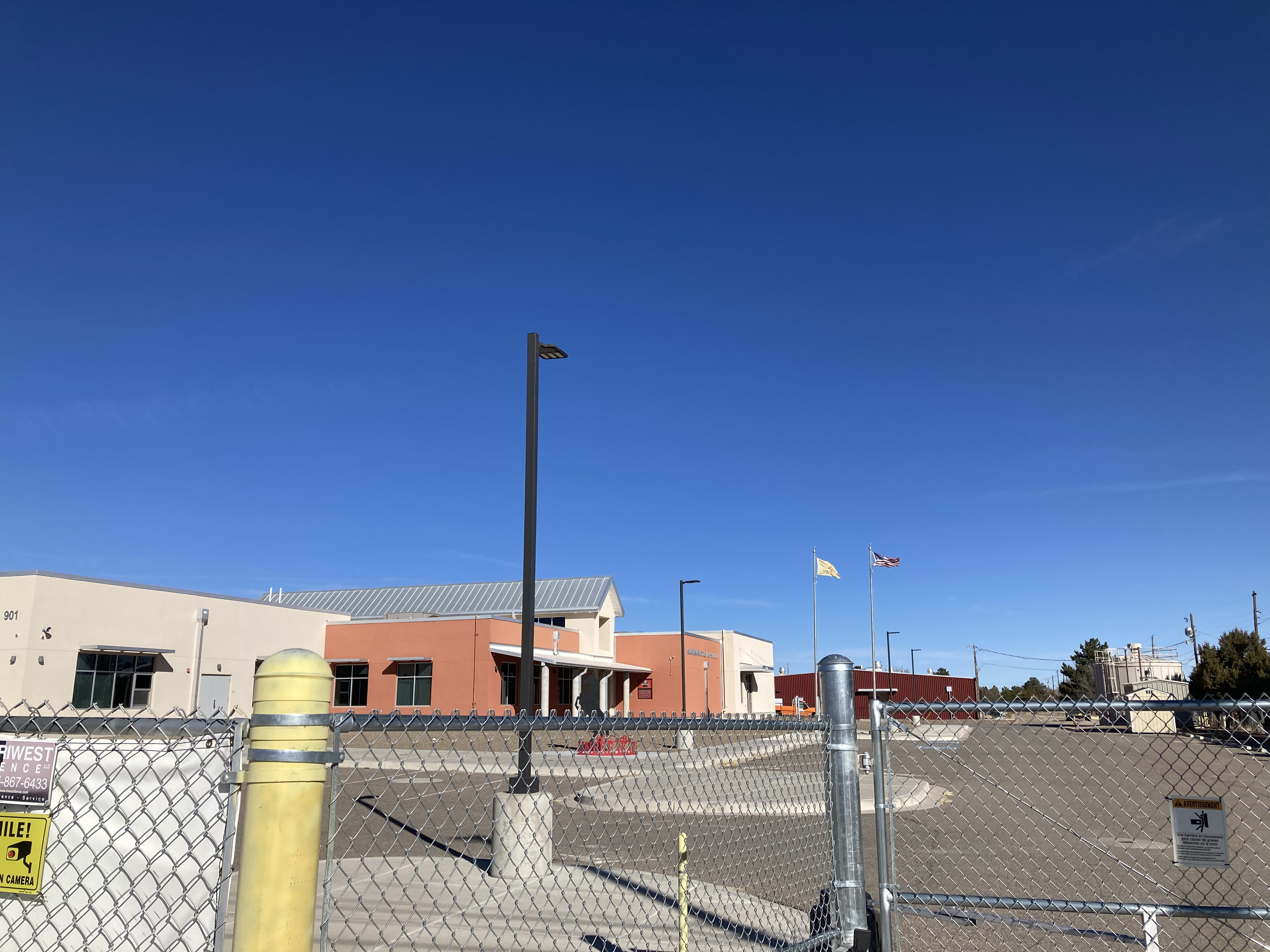
Mountainair Middle School

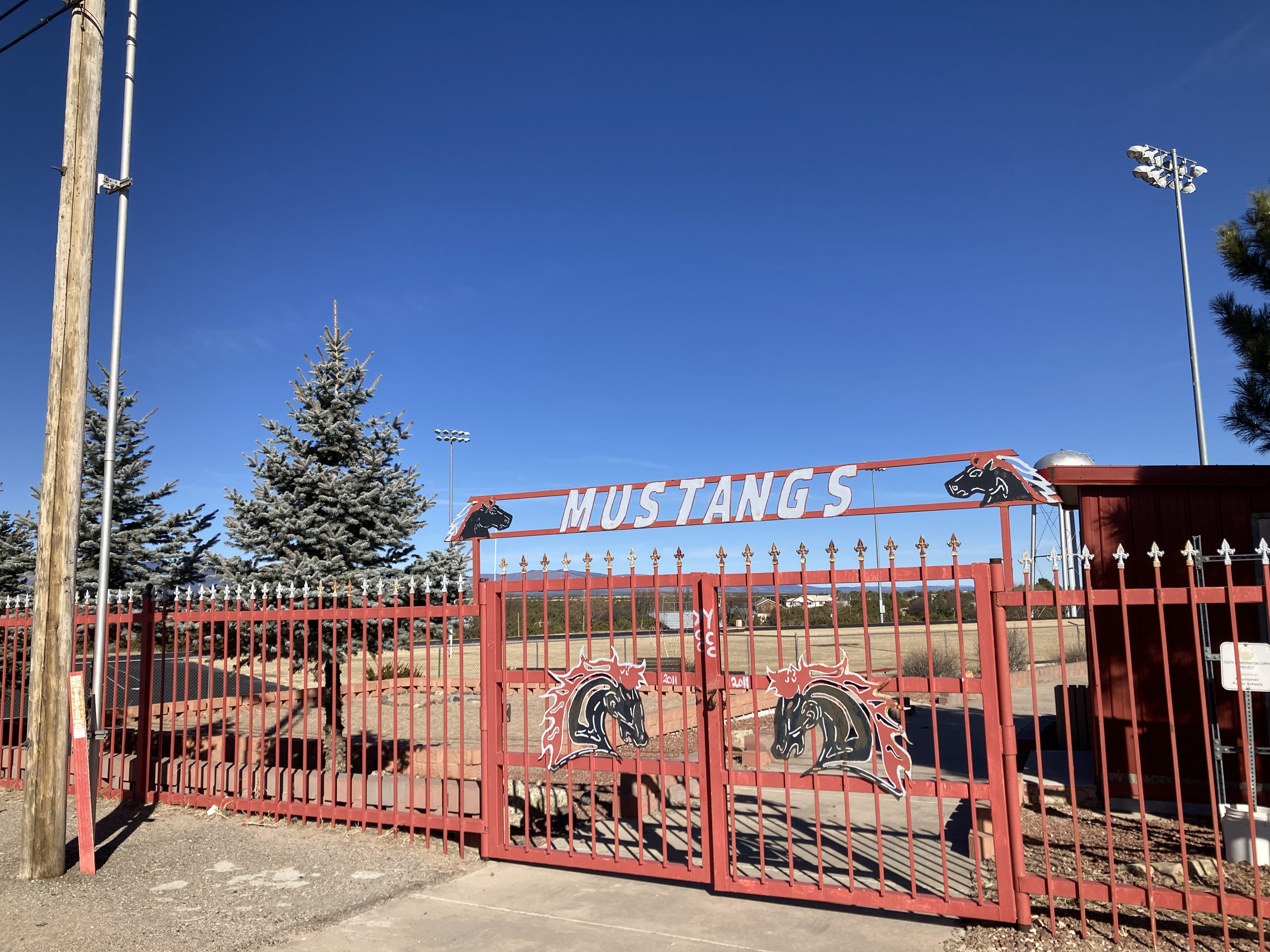
American football studio

Mountainair Public Schools is a school district headquartered in Mountainair, New Mexico. It has two schools: Mountainair Elementary School and Mountainair Middle/High School.

Within Torrance County the district includes: Mountainair, Deer Canyon, Manzano, and Punta de Agua. It also includes a portion of Socorro County.

== History ==
In 2000 both the elementary and high schools were on the New Mexico list of strongly improving schools; this was the first time that the schools appeared on that list.

In November 2001 the New Mexico Department of Health gave a $12,493 grant to the district for the Coordinated Approach to Child Health (CATCH) program.
