= Mountainair Municipal Auditorium =

- U.S. National Register of Historic Places
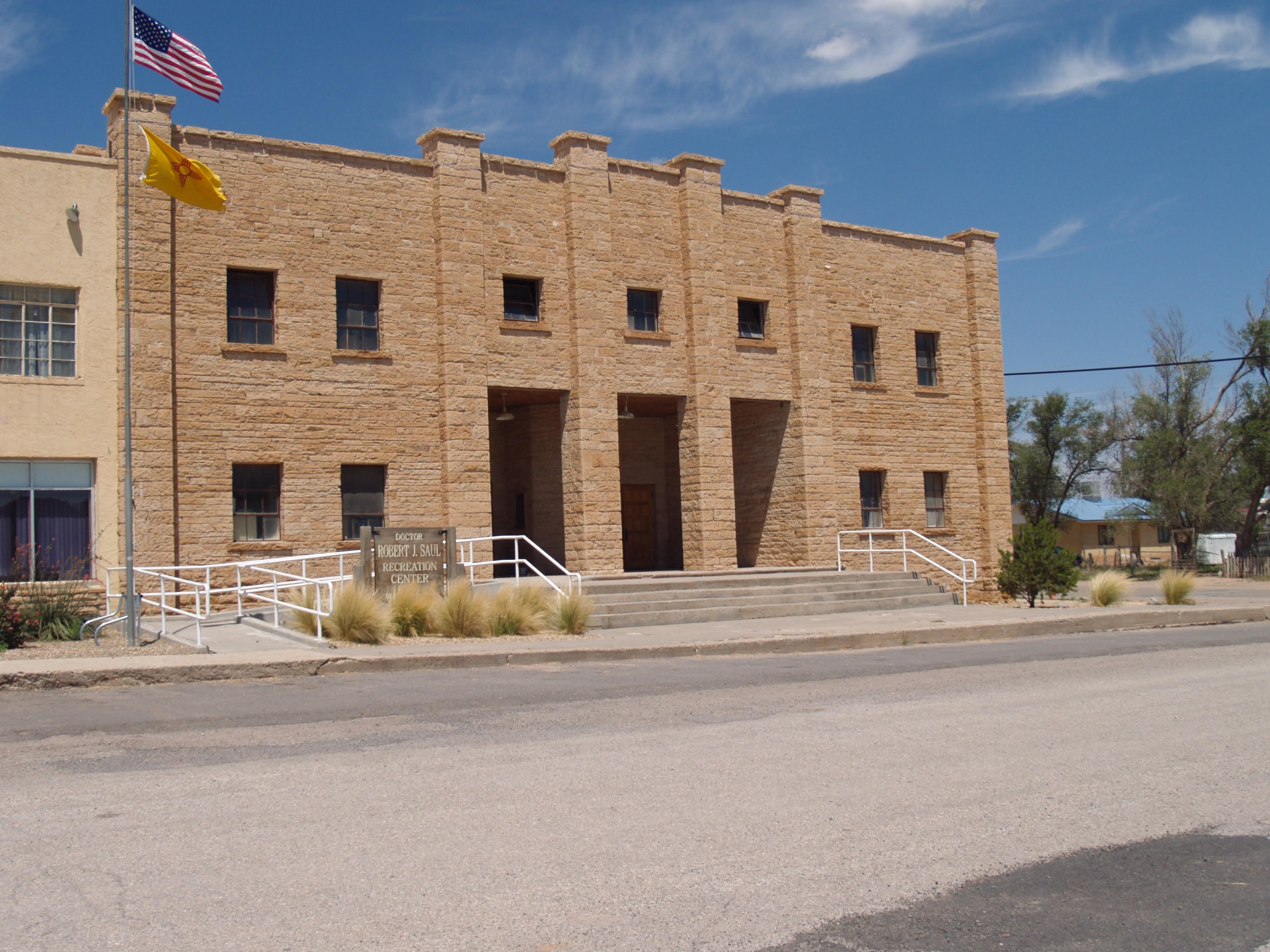

- Location within New Mexico
- Location: Southwest corner of Roosevelt Ave. and Beal St., Mountainair, New Mexico
- Coordinates: 34°31′16″N 106°14′34″W
- Area: less than one acre
- Built: 1934
- Built by: FERA-WPA
- Architect: Crist, Everett
- Architectural style: Moderne, PWA Moderne
- NRHP reference No.: 87000651
- Added to NRHP: April 30, 1987

The Mountainair Municipal Auditorium, in Mountainair, New Mexico, was built in 1934. It was listed on the National Register of Historic Places in 1987.

It has also been known as the Mountainair Community Building and as the Community Center.

It is the most prominent building in Mountainair, and was used as a political symbol of New Deal programs by New Mexico Governor Clyde Tingley.
