= Deer Canyon, New Mexico =

- Census-designated place
- Location within New Mexico Location within the United States
- Coordinates: 34°27′40″N 106°15′02″W
- Country: United States
- State: New Mexico
- County: Torrance

Area
  - Total: 8.00 sq mi (20.71 km^{2})
  - Land: 8.00 sq mi (20.71 km^{2})
  - Water: 0 sq mi (0.00 km^{2})
- Elevation: 6,670 ft (2,030 m)

Population (2020)
  - Total: 74
  - Density: 9.2/sq mi (3.57/km^{2})
- Time zone: UTC-7 (Mountain (MST))
  - Summer (DST): UTC-6 (MDT)
- ZIP Code: 87036 (Mountainair)
- Area code: 505
- FIPS code: 35-20015
- GNIS feature ID: 2806785

Deer Canyon is a census-designated place (CDP) in Torrance County, New Mexico, United States. It was first listed as a CDP prior to the 2020 census. As of the 2020 census, Deer Canyon had a population of 74.

The CDP is in the southwestern part of the county, at the base of 400-foot-high (120 m) cliffs that rise to the southeast. It is 7 miles (11 km) south of Mountainair and 70 miles (110 km) southeast of Albuquerque.

== Demographics ==
Historical population
Census	Pop.	Note	%±
2020	74		—
U.S. Decennial Census

== Education ==
Its school district is Mountainair Public Schools.
