= Bayo Road =

- U.S. National Register of Historic Places
- Location within New Mexico
- Location: Approx. 420 feet northwest of the junction of Diamond Dr. and San Ildefonso Rd., Los Alamos, New Mexico
- Coordinates: 35°53′58″N 106°17′51″W
- Area: 4.9 acres (2.0 ha)
- Built: 1943
- Architectural style: Road
- MPS: Homestead and Ranch School Era Roads and Trails of Los Alamos, New Mexico MPS
- NRHP reference No.: 03001141
- Added to NRHP: November 7, 2003

Bayo Road, in Los Alamos, New Mexico, was listed on the National Register of Historic Places in 2003. It is also known as Bayo Canyon Road.

It is an unimproved road approximately 11,942 feet (3,640 m) long, which "traverses the north wall of Bayo Canyon, a narrow canyon located between Barranca and North mesas, Los Alamos." It is largely on bedrock, and runs east–west, in part through a ponderosa pine forest.

It is significant as a historic homestead road; it long served homesteads in the area. But in 1943 the area was abruptly closed to access when it was acquired for use by the Manhattan Project to build an atomic bomb, and Army security forces subsequently patrolled the area.

It perhaps coincides partly or wholly with the modern Bayo Canyon Trail, which is identifiable in online maps.
