= Torrance County, New Mexico =

County in New Mexico, United States

- County
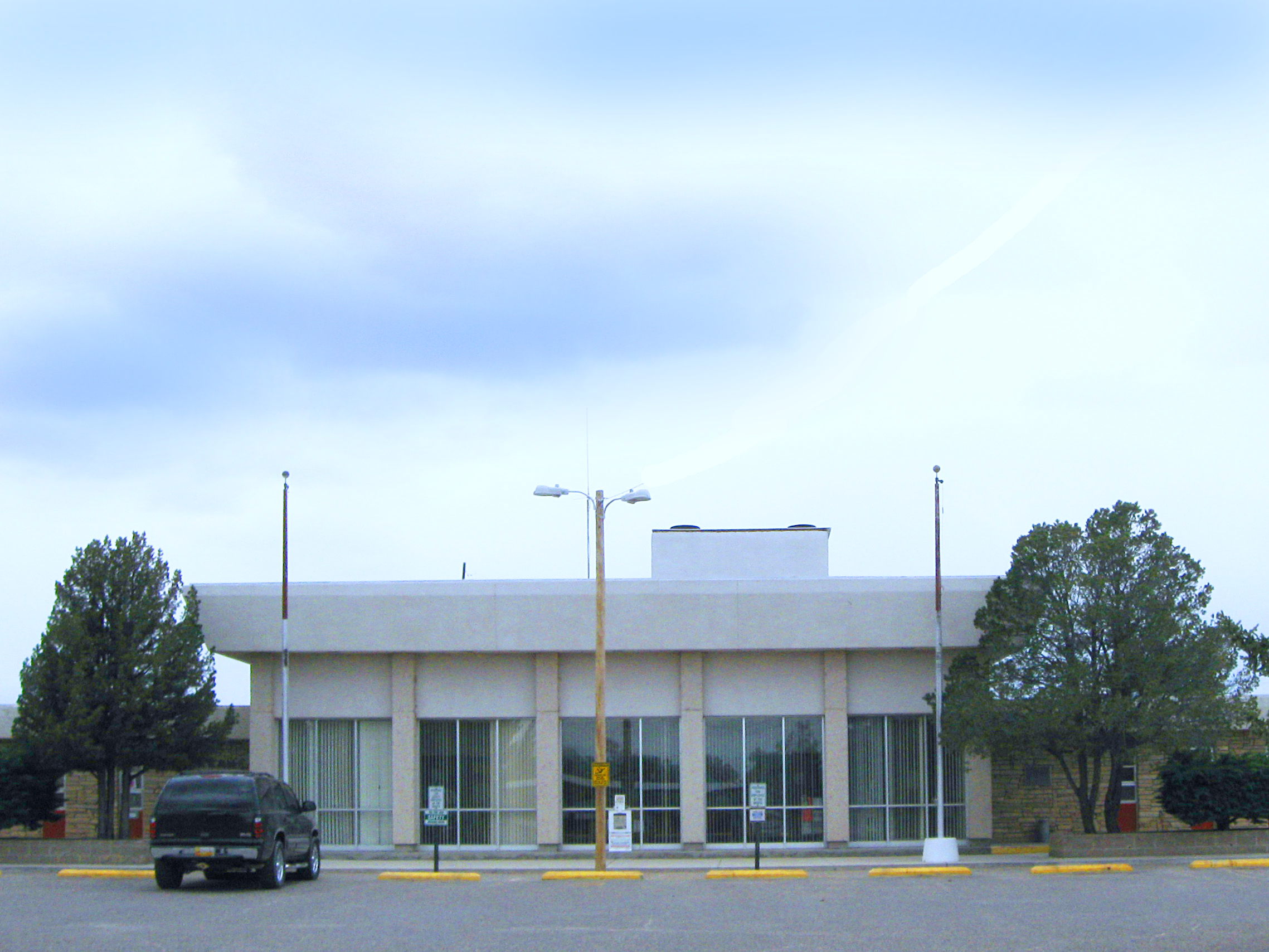
- Torrance County Courthouse in Estancia

- Flag Seal

- Location within the U.S. state of New Mexico
- Coordinates: 34°38′N 105°51′W
- Country: United States
- State: New Mexico
- Founded: March 16, 1903
- Seat: Estancia
- Largest city: Moriarty

Area
  - Total: 3,346 sq mi (8,670 km^{2})
  - Land: 3,345 sq mi (8,660 km^{2})
  - Water: 0.9 sq mi (2.3 km^{2}) 0.03%

Population (2020)
  - Total: 15,045
  - Estimate (2025): 16,100 ▲
  - Density: 4.498/sq mi (1.737/km^{2})
- Time zone: UTC−7 (Mountain)
  - Summer (DST): UTC−6 (MDT)
- Congressional district: 1st
- Website: www.torrancecountynm.org

Torrance County is a county located in the center of the U.S. state of New Mexico. As of the 2020 census, the population was 15,045. The county seat is Estancia.

The geographic center of New Mexico is located in Torrance County, southwest of the Village of Willard, and in 2010, the center of population of New Mexico was located in Torrance County, near Manzano. Torrance County is included in the Albuquerque metropolitan area.

== Geography ==
According to the U.S. Census Bureau, the county has a total area of 3,346 square miles (8,670 km^{2}), of which 0.9 square miles (2.3 km^{2}) (0.03%) is covered by water. Most of the county is gently rolling grassland ranging from 6000 to 6200 feet in elevation. The Manzano Mountains rising to 10,098 feet on the western edge of the county provide it with its only significant topographic relief. The Manzano Wilderness area includes the highest part of the mountains. The other notable geographic feature of the county is the series of playas and seasonal lakes centering on Laguna del Perro southeast of Estancia.

=== Adjacent counties ===
- Santa Fe County - north
- San Miguel County - north
- Guadalupe County - east
- Lincoln County - south
- Socorro County - south
- Valencia County - west
- Bernalillo County - northwest

=== National protected areas ===
- Cibola National Forest (part)
- Salinas Pueblo Missions National Monument (part)

== Government ==
County Commissioners

- District 1: Kevin McCall (2019 - 2022)
- District 2: Ryan Schwebach (2019 - 2022)
- District 3: Samuel Schropp (2023 - 2024)
- County Manager - Janice Y. Barela
- County Clerk - Linda Jaramillo (2023 - 2024)
- County Treasurer - Tracy L. Sedillo (2021 - 2024)
- County Assessor - Jesse Lucero (2019 - 2022)
- County Sheriff - David Frazee (2023–2026)
- County Probate Judge - Josie Chavez-Eaton (2019 - 2022)

United States presidential election results for Torrance County, New Mexico
Year	Republican		Democratic		Third party(ies)	
Year	No.	%	No.	%	No.	%
1912	520	39.54%	390	29.66%	405	30.80%
1916	948	55.83%	679	39.99%	71	4.18%
1920	1,751	60.28%	1,125	38.73%	29	1.00%
1924	1,666	51.18%	1,269	38.99%	320	9.83%
1928	1,958	64.54%	1,070	35.27%	6	0.20%
1932	1,803	44.29%	2,202	54.09%	66	1.62%
1936	1,843	43.60%	2,346	55.50%	38	0.90%
1940	2,509	56.52%	1,921	43.28%	9	0.20%
1944	2,014	58.28%	1,438	41.61%	4	0.12%
1948	1,709	50.09%	1,696	49.71%	7	0.21%
1952	1,747	54.99%	1,422	44.76%	8	0.25%
1956	1,567	56.23%	1,201	43.09%	19	0.68%
1960	1,554	53.88%	1,308	45.35%	22	0.76%
1964	1,183	44.90%	1,446	54.88%	6	0.23%
1968	1,316	52.98%	974	39.21%	194	7.81%
1972	1,758	64.54%	908	33.33%	58	2.13%
1976	1,462	48.54%	1,526	50.66%	24	0.80%
1980	1,907	57.42%	1,261	37.97%	153	4.61%
1984	2,326	64.02%	1,274	35.07%	33	0.91%
1988	2,252	57.19%	1,618	41.09%	68	1.73%
1992	1,667	40.00%	1,662	39.88%	838	20.11%
1996	2,154	46.27%	2,072	44.51%	429	9.22%
2000	2,891	58.29%	1,868	37.66%	201	4.05%
2004	4,026	61.87%	2,386	36.67%	95	1.46%
2008	3,735	53.81%	3,087	44.47%	119	1.71%
2012	3,529	55.12%	2,428	37.93%	445	6.95%
2016	3,714	58.73%	1,785	28.23%	825	13.05%
2020	4,772	65.54%	2,344	32.19%	165	2.27%
2024	4,880	67.98%	2,144	29.86%	155	2.16%

== Demographics ==
Historical population
Census	Pop.	Note	%±
1910	10,119		—
1920	9,731		−3.8%
1930	9,269		−4.7%
1940	11,026		19.0%
1950	8,012		−27.3%
1960	6,497		−18.9%
1970	5,290		−18.6%
1980	7,491		41.6%
1990	10,285		37.3%
2000	16,911		64.4%
2010	16,383		−3.1%
2020	15,045		−8.2%
2025 (est.)	16,100	▲	7.0%
U.S. Decennial Census; 1790-1960 1900-1990; 1990-2000 2010

=== 2020 census ===
As of the 2020 census, the county had a population of 15,045. The median age was 45.5 years. 20.7% of residents were under the age of 18 and 21.6% of residents were 65 years of age or older. For every 100 females there were 102.3 males, and for every 100 females age 18 and over there were 103.9 males age 18 and over.

Torrance County, New Mexico – Racial and ethnic composition Note: the US Census treats Hispanic/Latino as an ethnic category. This table excludes Latinos from the racial categories and assigns them to a separate category. Hispanics/Latinos may be of any race.
Race / Ethnicity (NH = Non-Hispanic)	Pop 2000	Pop 2010	Pop 2020	% 2000	% 2010	% 2020
White alone (NH)	9,677	9,173	7,761	57.22%	55.99%	51.59%
Black or African American alone (NH)	255	172	121	1.51%	1.05%	0.80%
Native American or Alaska Native alone (NH)	266	274	237	1.57%	1.67%	1.58%
Asian alone (NH)	51	61	51	0.30%	0.37%	0.34%
Pacific Islander alone (NH)	17	7	2	0.10%	0.04%	0.01%
Other race alone (NH)	72	24	90	0.43%	0.15%	0.60%
Mixed race or Multiracial (NH)	290	273	518	1.71%	1.67%	3.44%
Hispanic or Latino (any race)	6,283	6,399	6,265	37.15%	39.06%	41.64%
Total	16,911	16,383	15,045	100.00%	100.00%	100.00%

The racial makeup of the county was 65.1% White, 0.9% Black or African American, 2.6% American Indian and Alaska Native, 0.4% Asian, 0.1% Native Hawaiian and Pacific Islander, 15.5% from some other race, and 15.5% from two or more races. Hispanic or Latino residents of any race comprised 41.6% of the population.

0.0% of residents lived in urban areas, while 100.0% lived in rural areas.

There were 5,953 households in the county, of which 26.9% had children under the age of 18 living with them and 25.1% had a female householder with no spouse or partner present. About 28.9% of all households were made up of individuals and 14.6% had someone living alone who was 65 years of age or older.

There were 7,169 housing units, of which 17.0% were vacant. Among occupied housing units, 80.7% were owner-occupied and 19.3% were renter-occupied. The homeowner vacancy rate was 2.6% and the rental vacancy rate was 7.9%.

=== 2010 census ===
As of the 2010 census, there were 16,383 people, 6,264 households, and 4,192 families residing in the county. The population density was 4.9 inhabitants per square mile (1.9/km^{2}). There were 7,798 housing units at an average density of 2.3 per square mile (0.89/km^{2}). The racial makeup of the county was 76.05% white, 2.34% American Indian, 1.34% black or African American, 0.43% Asian, 15.47% from other races, and 4.32% from two or more races. Those of Hispanic or Latino origin made up 39.1% of the population. In terms of ancestry, 17.5% were German, 12.2% were Irish, 10.0% were English, and 2.3% were American.

Of the 6,264 households, 31.8% had children under the age of 18 living with them, 48.5% were married couples living together, 12.0% had a female householder with no husband present, 33.1% were non-families, and 27.6% of all households were made up of individuals. The average household size was 2.52 and the average family size was 3.06. The median age was 41.6 years.

The median income for a household in the county was $37,117 and the median income for a family was $43,914. Males had a median income of $37,545 versus $28,826 for females. The per capita income for the county was $17,278. About 13.5% of families and 19.4% of the population were below the poverty line, including 30.7% of those under age 18 and 11.5% of those age 65 or over.

=== 2000 census ===
As of the 2000 census, there were 16,911 people, 6,024 households, and 4,391 families residing in the county. The population density was 5 people per square mile (1.9 people/km^{2}). There were 7,257 housing units at an average density of 2 per square mile (0.77/km^{2}). The racial makeup of the county was 74.10% White, 1.63% Black or African American, 1.71% Native American, 17.64% from other races, and 4.41% from two or more races. 37.15% of the population were Hispanic or Latino of any race.

There were 6,024 households, out of which 37.80% had children under the age of 18 living with them, 55.40% were married couples living together, 12.30% had a female householder with no husband present, and 27.10% were non-families. 23.20% of all households were made up of individuals, and 7.90% had someone living alone who was 65 years of age or older. The average household size was 2.72 and the average family size was 3.20.

In the county, the population was spread out, with 30.40% under the age of 18, 7.50% from 18 to 24, 29.20% from 25 to 44, 23.20% from 45 to 64, and 9.70% who were 65 years of age or older. The median age was 35 years. For every 100 females there were 105.50 males. For every 100 females age 18 and over, there were 106.20 males.

The median income for a household in the county was $30,446, and the median income for a family was $34,461. Males had a median income of $29,403 versus $21,833 for females. The per capita income for the county was $14,134. About 15.20% of families and 19.00% of the population were below the poverty line, including 24.50% of those under age 18 and 12.00% of those age 65 or over.

== Communities ==
=== City ===
- Moriarty

=== Towns ===
- Estancia (county seat)
- Mountainair

=== Villages ===
- Encino
- Willard

=== Census-designated places ===
- Deer Canyon
- Duran
- Indian Hills
- Manzano
- Manzano Springs (partial)
- McIntosh
- Punta de Agua
- Tajique
- Torreon

=== Unincorporated communities ===
- Abo
- Cedarvale
- Clines Corners
- Wagon Wheel

== Education ==
School districts include:

- Corona Municipal Schools
- Estancia Municipal Schools
- Moriarty Municipal Schools
- Mountainair Public Schools
- Vaughn Municipal Schools

== Transportation ==
=== Major highways ===
- I-40
  - I-40 BL (Moriarty)
- US 54
- US 60
- US 285
- NM 3
- NM 41
- NM 42
- NM 55
- NM 131
- NM 333
- NM 337
- NM 542

== See also ==
- National Register of Historic Places listings in Torrance County, New Mexico
- USS Torrance (AKA-76), a U.S. Navy ship named after the county
