= Manzano, New Mexico =

- CDP
- Location of Manzano, New Mexico

- Location in the United States
- Coordinates: 34°38′47″N 106°20′42″W
- Country: United States
- State: New Mexico
- County: Torrance

Area
  - Total: 1.69 sq mi (4.38 km^{2})
  - Land: 1.69 sq mi (4.38 km^{2})
  - Water: 0 sq mi (0.00 km^{2})
- Elevation: 7,195 ft (2,193 m)

Population (2020)
  - Total: 26
  - Density: 15.4/sq mi (5.94/km^{2})
- Time zone: UTC-7 (Mountain (MST))
  - Summer (DST): UTC-6 (MDT)
- Area code: 505
- FIPS code: 35-46730
- GNIS feature ID: 2408170

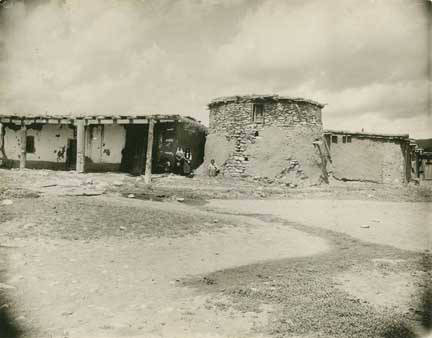
Adobe homes with torreon (defensive tower), Manzano, circa 1900

Manzano is a census-designated place (CDP) in Torrance County, New Mexico, United States. The population was 26 at the 2020 census. The Quarai Ruins of Salinas Pueblo Missions National Monument are located near the town. The center of population of New Mexico is located in Manzano.

Manzano is part of the Albuquerque, New Mexico, metropolitan statistical area. Manzano comes from the Spanish word for "apple tree."

== Geography ==
According to the United States Census Bureau, the CDP has a total area of 1.7 square miles (4.4 km^{2}), all land.

== Demographics ==
Historical population
Census	Pop.	Note	%±
2020	26		—
U.S. Decennial Census

As of the census of 2000, there were 54 people, 17 households, and 12 families residing in the CDP. The population density was 32.0 inhabitants per square mile (12.4/km^{2}). There were 22 housing units at an average density of 13.1 per square mile (5.1/km^{2}). The racial makeup of the CDP was 55.56% White, 31.48% Native American, 11.11% from other races, and 1.85% from two or more races. Hispanic or Latino of any race were 87.04% of the population.

There were 17 households, out of which 41.2% had children under the age of 18 living with them, 41.2% were married couples living together, 11.8% had a female householder with no husband present, and 29.4% were non-families. 23.5% of all households were made up of individuals, and 5.9% had someone living alone who was 65 years of age or older. The average household size was 3.18 and the average family size was 3.75.

In the CDP, the population was spread out, with 31.5% under the age of 18, 7.4% from 18 to 24, 22.2% from 25 to 44, 18.5% from 45 to 64, and 20.4% who were 65 years of age or older. The median age was 40 years. For every 100 females, there were 170 males. For every 100 females age 18 and over, there were 105.6 males.

The median income for a household in the CDP was $13,750, and the median income for a family was $19,375. Males had a median income of $33,750 versus $0 for females. The per capita income for the CDP was $5,935. There were 35.0% of families and 37.7% of the population living below the poverty line, including 38.5% of under eighteens and 50.0% of those over 64.

== Education ==
Manzano falls under the jurisdiction of Mountainair Public Schools.

== See also ==
- Torreon, Torrance County, New Mexico, was named for the torreons at Manzano.
