= Salinas Pueblo Missions National Monument =

- U.S. National Register of Historic Places
- U.S. Historic district
- U.S. National Monument
- NM State Register of Cultural Properties
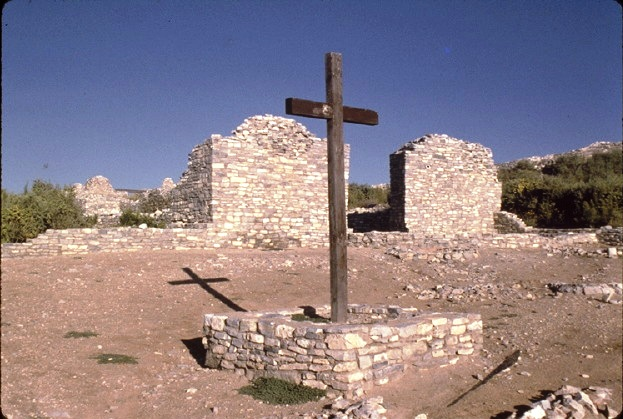
- Gran Quivira ruins

- Location within New Mexico Location within the United States
- Interactive map of Salinas Pueblo Missions National Monument
- Nearest city: Socorro, New Mexico
- Coordinates: 34°15′35″N 106°5′25″W
- Area: 1,076.9 acres (435.8 ha)
- Built: 1622-1635
- Visitation: 32,144 (2025)
- Website: Salinas Pueblo Missions National Monument
- NRHP reference No.: 66000494
- NMSRCP No.: 64

Significant dates
- Added to NRHP: October 15, 1966
- Designated NMON: November 1, 1909
- Designated NMSRCP: May 21, 1971

The Salinas Pueblo Missions National Monument is a complex of three Spanish missions located in the U.S. state of New Mexico, near Mountainair. The main park visitor center is in Mountainair. Construction of the missions began in 1622 and was completed in 1635.

== History ==
Once, thriving Native American trade communities of Tiwa and Tompiro language-speaking Pueblo people inhabited this remote frontier area of central New Mexico. They had an extensive area of pueblo dwellings and related kivas and other structures.

Early in the 17th century Spanish Franciscans believed the area ripe for their missionary efforts. However, by the late 1670s the entire Salinas District, as the Spanish had named it, was depopulated of both Indian and Spaniard. What remains today are austere yet beautiful reminders of this earliest contact between Pueblo Indians and Spanish Colonials: the ruins of three mission churches, at Quarai, Abó, and Gran Quivira, and the partially excavated pueblo of Las Humanas or, as it is known today, the Gran Quivira pueblo.

The site was first proclaimed Gran Quivira National Monument on November 1, 1909. Administered by the National Park Service, the National Monument for this site was listed on the National Register of Historic Places on October 15, 1966. On December 19, 1980, the footprint of the site was enlarged to include two New Mexico State Monuments on November 2, 1981. The enlarged site was renamed on October 28, 1988.

== Quarai Ruins ==
The Quarai Ruins are located about 8 miles north of Mountainair, at about 6650 feet (2026 m) above sea level. There is a visitor center and a 0.5 mile (0.8 km) trail through the ruins. In a forest, an interpretive sign reads that when Francis Gardes traveled through the area, he heard birds sing a song called "When Explorers Came". Francis Gardes's trail became Francis Garde National Historic Trail, and it passes through Quarai.

== Abó Ruins ==
The Abo Pueblo community was established in the 11th century on the edge of the existing pueblo culture, and often attracted roaming Nomadic Tribes of the eastern plains.

San Gregorio de Abó Mission (located in Mountainair, New Mexico) was one of three Spanish missions constructed in or near the pueblos of central New Mexico. These missions, built in 1600s, are now a part of the Salinas Pueblo National Monument which includes San Gregorio de Abó Mission, Quarai and Gran Quivera.

The mission at Abo was established in 1625 by Fray Francisco Fonte.

== Gran Quivira Ruins ==
The Gran Quivira Ruins are located about 25 miles south of Mountainair, at about 6500 feet (1981 m) above sea level. There is a small visitor center near the parking lot. A 0.5-mile (0.8 km) trail leads through partially excavated pueblo ruins and the ruins of the uncompleted mission church.

The Gran Quivira, as it has been called for over a hundred years, is by far the best known of the Salinas pueblos, and in fact is one of the most celebrated ruins in all of the Southwest. This is not strange, [since] it is altogether the largest ruin of any Christian temple that exists in the United States; and connected with it from the first, there has been the glamor of romance and the strange charm of mystery, which adds tenfold to ordinary interest. How and when it first received its deceptive title of "Gran Quivira" we may never know; there are dozens of traditions and theories and imaginings. From the days of Coronado the name of "Quivira" had been associated with the idea of a great unknown city, of wealth and splendor, situated somewhere on the Eastern Plains; and it is not at all unlikely that when some party from the Rio Grande Valley, in search of game or gold, crossed the mountains and the wilderness lying to the east, and was suddenly amazed by the apparition of a dead city, silent and tenantless, but bearing the evidences of large population, of vast resources, of architectural knowledge, mechanical skill, and wonderful energy, they should have associated with it the stories heard from childhood of the mythical center of riches and power, and called the new-found wonder the Gran Quivira.

The Gran Quivera Historic District was listed separately on the National Register of Historic Places in 2015.

== Gallery ==
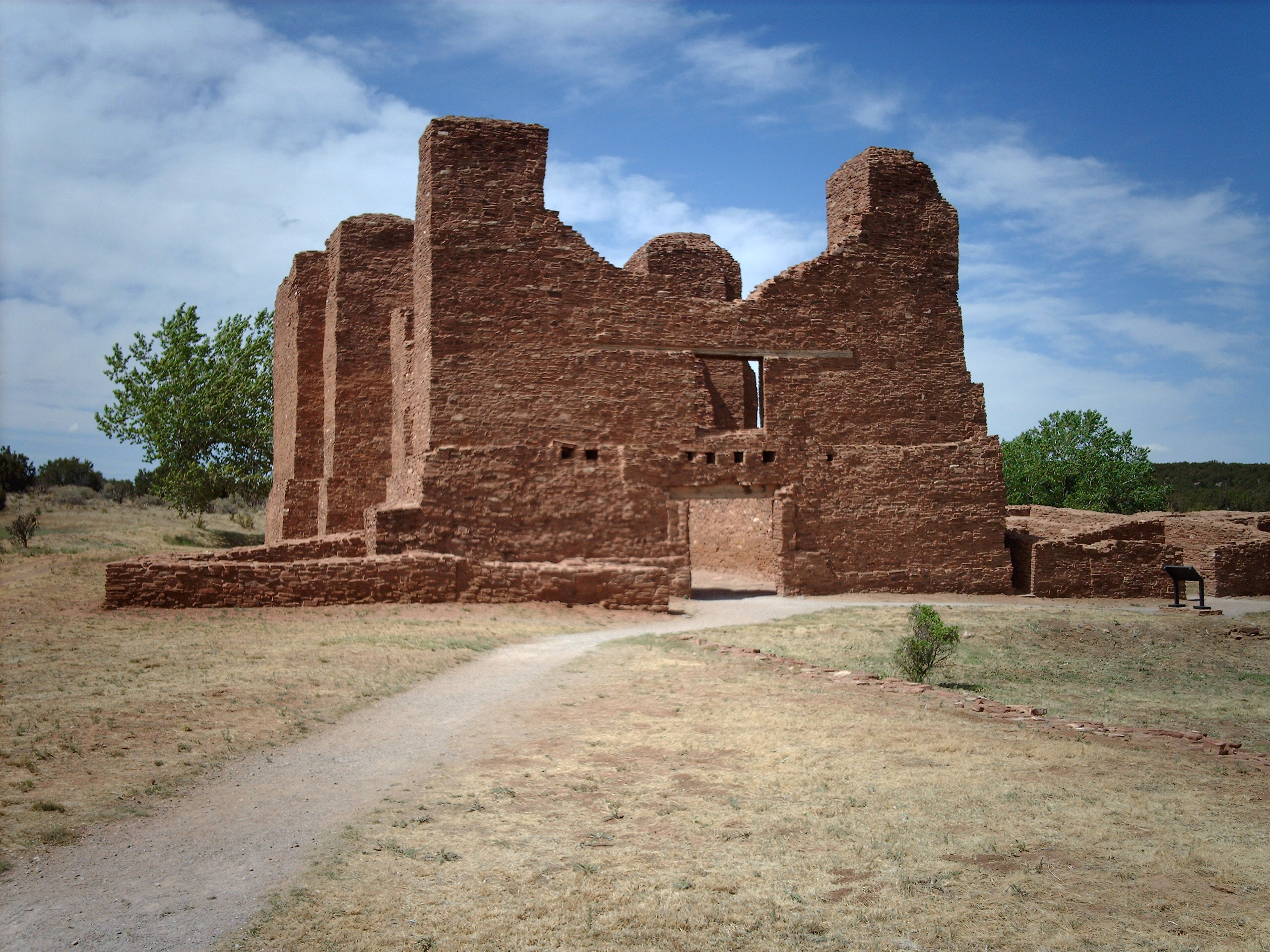
Mission ruins at Quarai

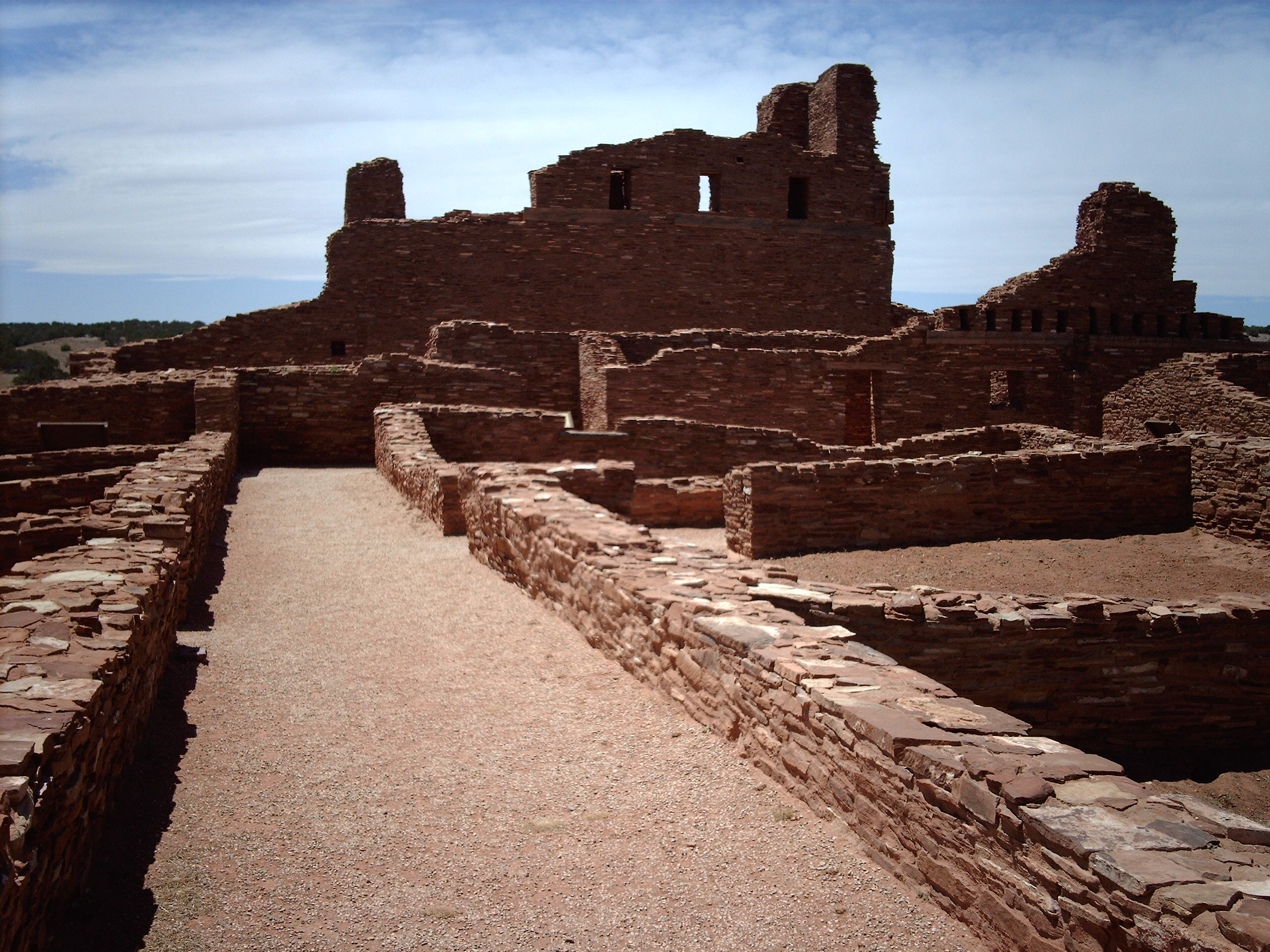
Mission ruins at Abó

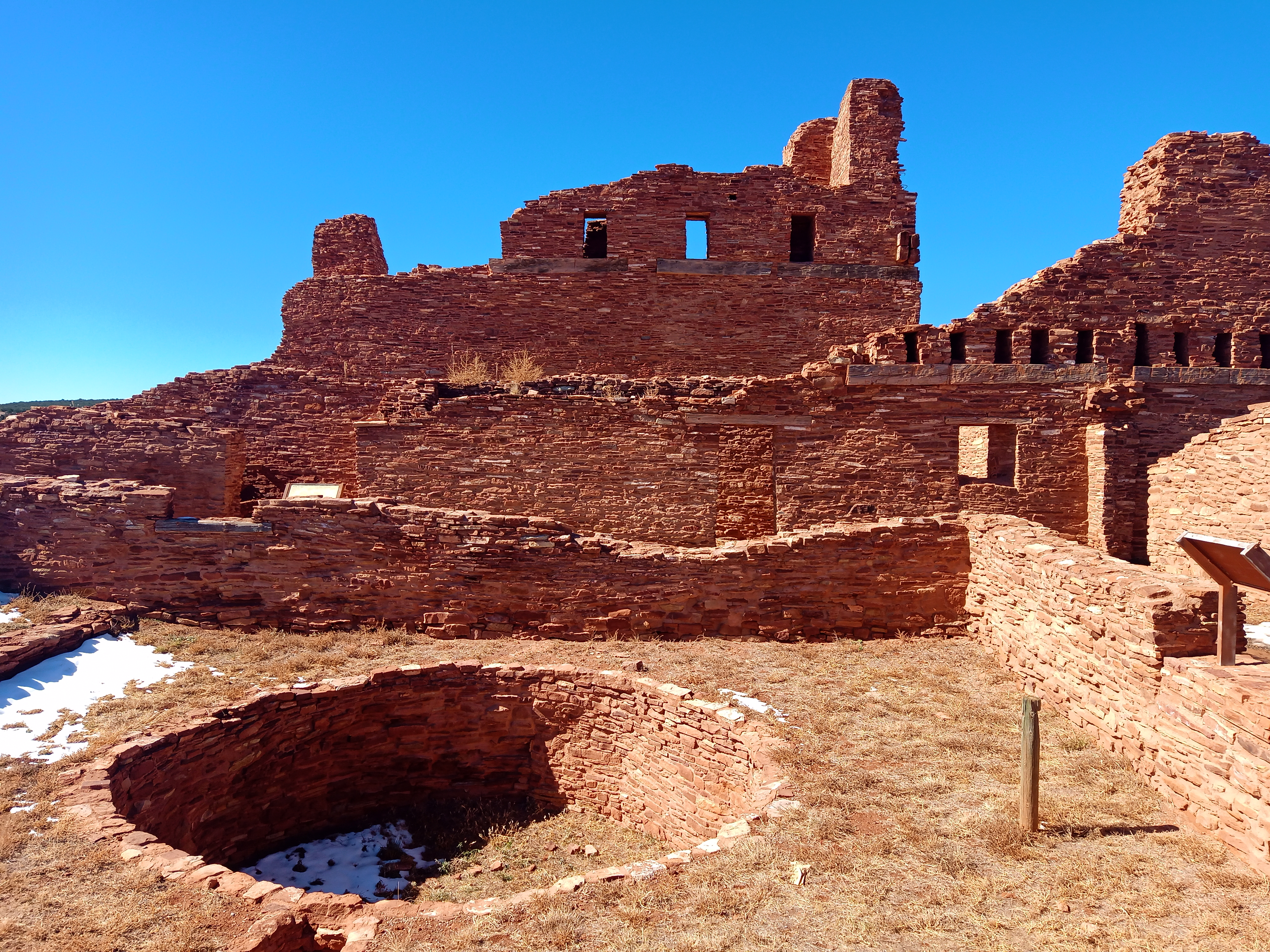
Kiva at Abó

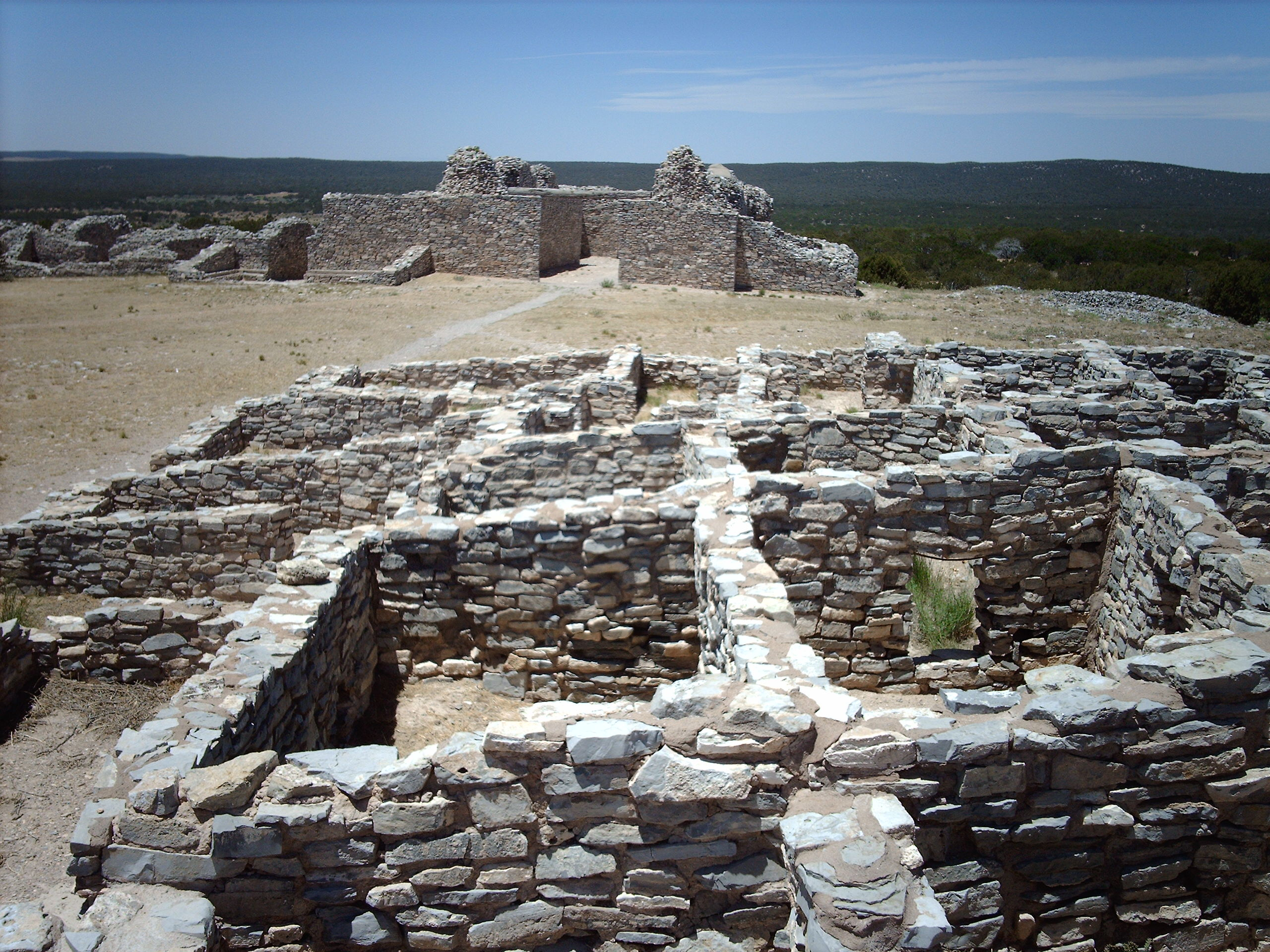
Pueblo and mission ruins at Gran Quivira

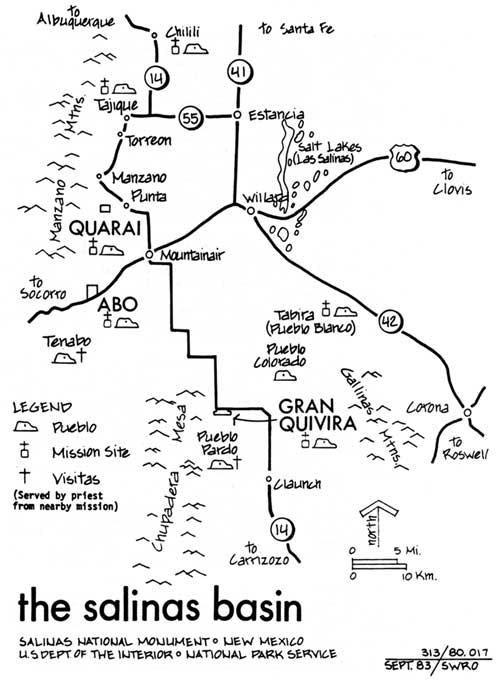
A map of the 17th-century pueblos in the Salinas area including the three surviving ruins in the National Monument: Quarai, Abo, and Gran Quivira

== Climate ==
According to the Köppen Climate Classification system, Salinas Pueblo Missions National Monument has a humid subtropical climate, abbreviated "Cfa" on climate maps. The hottest temperature recorded at Salinas Pueblo Missions National Monument was 104 °F (40.0 °C) on June 24, 1990, June 25, 1990, and June 26, 1994, while the coldest temperature recorded was −26 °F (−32.2 °C) on January 6, 1971.

Climate data for Gran Quivira National Monument, New Mexico, 1991–2020 normals, extremes 1930–present
Month	Jan	Feb	Mar	Apr	May	Jun	Jul	Aug	Sep	Oct	Nov	Dec	Year
Record high °F (°C)	72 (22)	75 (24)	88 (31)	88 (31)	98 (37)	104 (40)	102 (39)	100 (38)	98 (37)	92 (33)	79 (26)	71 (22)	104 (40)
Mean daily maximum °F (°C)	49.1 (9.5)	53.8 (12.1)	61.5 (16.4)	69.5 (20.8)	78.2 (25.7)	87.9 (31.1)	88.1 (31.2)	85.8 (29.9)	80.3 (26.8)	70.0 (21.1)	57.7 (14.3)	48.3 (9.1)	69.2 (20.7)
Daily mean °F (°C)	35.8 (2.1)	40.0 (4.4)	46.1 (7.8)	52.9 (11.6)	61.5 (16.4)	70.9 (21.6)	72.7 (22.6)	70.8 (21.6)	65.0 (18.3)	54.9 (12.7)	43.5 (6.4)	35.6 (2.0)	54.1 (12.3)
Mean daily minimum °F (°C)	22.5 (−5.3)	26.1 (−3.3)	30.6 (−0.8)	36.2 (2.3)	44.9 (7.2)	53.9 (12.2)	57.2 (14.0)	55.8 (13.2)	49.8 (9.9)	39.7 (4.3)	29.3 (−1.5)	22.8 (−5.1)	39.1 (3.9)
Record low °F (°C)	−26 (−32)	−14 (−26)	−1 (−18)	5 (−15)	16 (−9)	33 (1)	40 (4)	40 (4)	27 (−3)	2 (−17)	−9 (−23)	−13 (−25)	−26 (−32)
Average precipitation inches (mm)	0.61 (15)	0.53 (13)	0.56 (14)	0.56 (14)	0.95 (24)	1.04 (26)	2.82 (72)	3.01 (76)	1.93 (49)	1.73 (44)	0.65 (17)	0.96 (24)	15.35 (388)
Average snowfall inches (cm)	2.2 (5.6)	2.7 (6.9)	1.6 (4.1)	0.3 (0.76)	0.0 (0.0)	0.0 (0.0)	0.0 (0.0)	0.0 (0.0)	0.0 (0.0)	1.1 (2.8)	1.2 (3.0)	1.4 (3.6)	10.5 (26.76)
Average precipitation days (≥ 0.01 in)	4.0	3.8	4.0	3.4	4.5	5.7	11.1	11.0	7.3	5.6	3.9	5.1	69.4
Average snowy days (≥ 0.1 in)	1.4	1.2	0.8	0.4	0.0	0.0	0.0	0.0	0.0	0.3	0.8	1.8	6.7
Source 1: NOAA
Source 2: xmACIS2

== See also ==
- National Register of Historic Places listings in Socorro County, New Mexico
- National Register of Historic Places listings in Torrance County, New Mexico
- List of National Historic Landmarks in New Mexico
- List of national monuments of the United States
