= Mountainair, New Mexico =

- Town
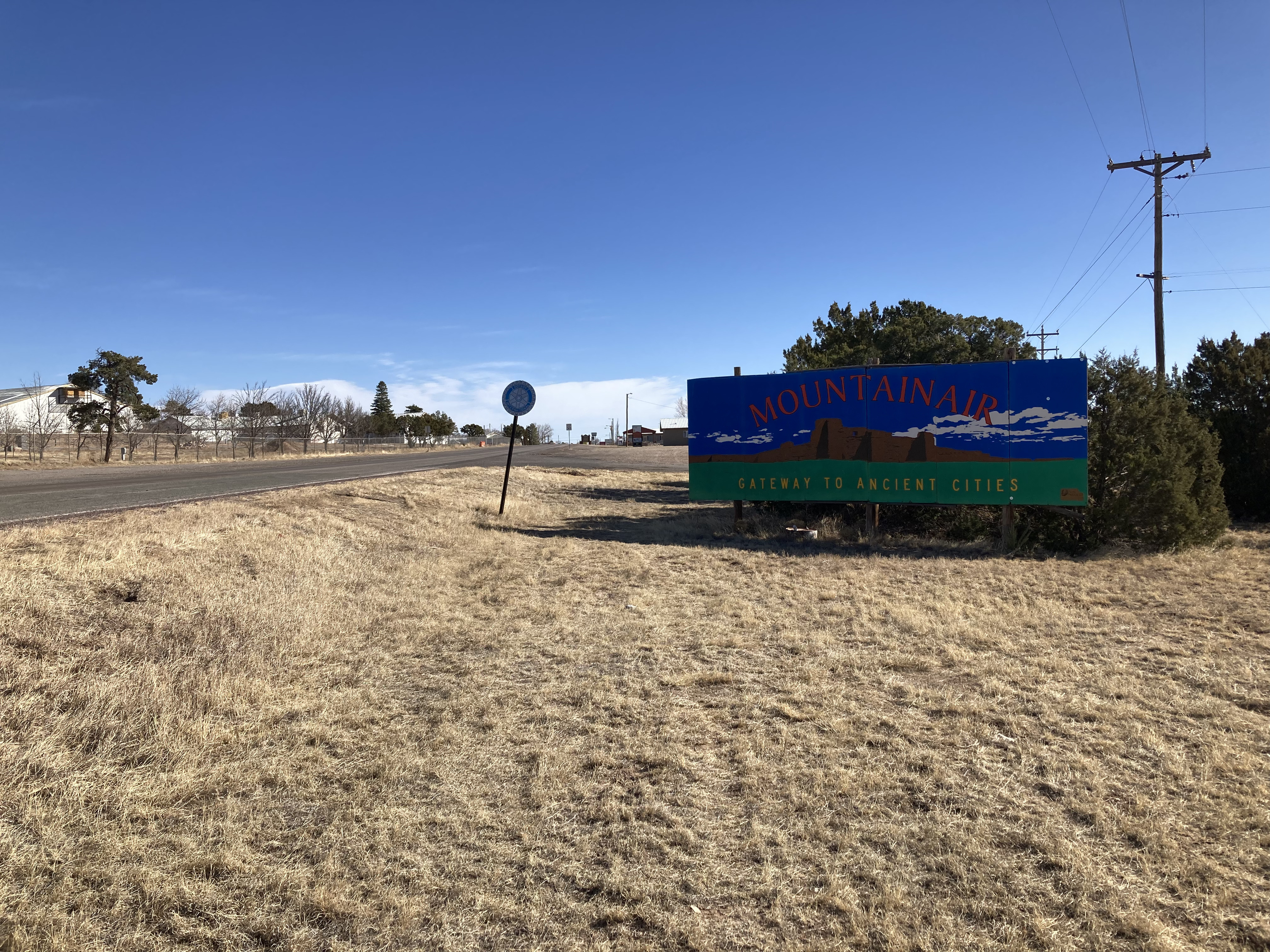
- Sign in west Mountainair
- Nickname: Monta
- Motto: "Gateway to ancient cities"
- Location of Mountainair, New Mexico

- Location in the United States
- Coordinates: 34°31′11″N 106°14′36″W
- Country: United States
- State: New Mexico
- County: Torrance

Area
  - Total: 1.58 sq mi (4.09 km^{2})
  - Land: 1.58 sq mi (4.09 km^{2})
  - Water: 0 sq mi (0.00 km^{2})
- Elevation: 6,513 ft (1,985 m)

Population (2020)
  - Total: 884
  - Density: 559.3/sq mi (215.93/km^{2})
- Time zone: UTC-7 (Mountain (MST))
  - Summer (DST): UTC-6 (MDT)
- ZIP code: 87036
- Area code: 505
- FIPS code: 35-50370
- GNIS feature ID: 2413025
- Website: mountainairnm.gov

Mountainair is a town in Torrance County, New Mexico, United States. It was founded in 1902 by John Corbett, Colonel E. C. Manning, and Elias S. Stover. The population was 884 at the 2020 census. It is part of the Albuquerque Metropolitan Statistical Area. The main visitor center for Salinas Pueblo Missions National Monument is located within the town.

== Geography ==
According to the United States Census Bureau, the town has a total area of 1.0 square mile (2.7 km^{2}), all land.

=== Climate ===
Climate data for Mountainair, New Mexico (1991–2020)
Month	Jan	Feb	Mar	Apr	May	Jun	Jul	Aug	Sep	Oct	Nov	Dec	Year
Mean daily maximum °F (°C)	46.5 (8.1)	51.9 (11.1)	60.2 (15.7)	68.3 (20.2)	76.6 (24.8)	86.7 (30.4)	87.4 (30.8)	85.0 (29.4)	79.2 (26.2)	69.1 (20.6)	56.7 (13.7)	46.5 (8.1)	67.8 (19.9)
Daily mean °F (°C)	34.9 (1.6)	38.8 (3.8)	45.6 (7.6)	52.1 (11.2)	60.4 (15.8)	70.3 (21.3)	73.1 (22.8)	71.4 (21.9)	65.2 (18.4)	55.0 (12.8)	43.0 (6.1)	34.5 (1.4)	53.7 (12.1)
Mean daily minimum °F (°C)	23.3 (−4.8)	25.6 (−3.6)	31.1 (−0.5)	35.9 (2.2)	44.2 (6.8)	53.8 (12.1)	58.9 (14.9)	57.7 (14.3)	51.2 (10.7)	40.9 (4.9)	29.3 (−1.5)	22.4 (−5.3)	39.5 (4.2)
Average precipitation inches (mm)	0.57 (14)	0.44 (11)	0.66 (17)	0.43 (11)	0.74 (19)	0.89 (23)	2.51 (64)	2.44 (62)	1.72 (44)	1.22 (31)	0.57 (14)	0.75 (19)	12.94 (329)
Average snowfall inches (cm)	2.7 (6.9)	3.2 (8.1)	2.0 (5.1)	0.6 (1.5)	0.0 (0.0)	0.0 (0.0)	0.0 (0.0)	0.0 (0.0)	0.0 (0.0)	0.2 (0.51)	1.2 (3.0)	4.2 (11)	14.1 (36.11)
Source: NOAA

== Demographics ==
Historical population
Census	Pop.	Note	%±
1920	577		—
1930	1,027		78.0%
1940	1,477		43.8%
1950	1,418		−4.0%
1960	1,605		13.2%
1970	1,022		−36.3%
1980	1,170		14.5%
1990	926		−20.9%
2000	1,116		20.5%
2010	928		−16.8%
2020	884		−4.7%
U.S. Decennial Census

At the 2020 census, Mountainair had 884 people, 447 households, and 323 families residing within the town. The racial makeup of the town was 58.48% White, 2.15% Native Americans, 2.03% African American, 0.04% Asian, 0.02% Pacific Islander, 18.55% from other races, and 18.10% from two or more races. Hispanic or Latino of any race were 50.11% of the population.

== Government ==
The following are the government officials of Mountainair as of June 2024:

Position	Official
Mayor	Peter Nieto
Mayor Pro-Tem	Gayle Jones
Councilperson(s)	Jose Torres Dustin Kayser Annette Padilla

== Education ==
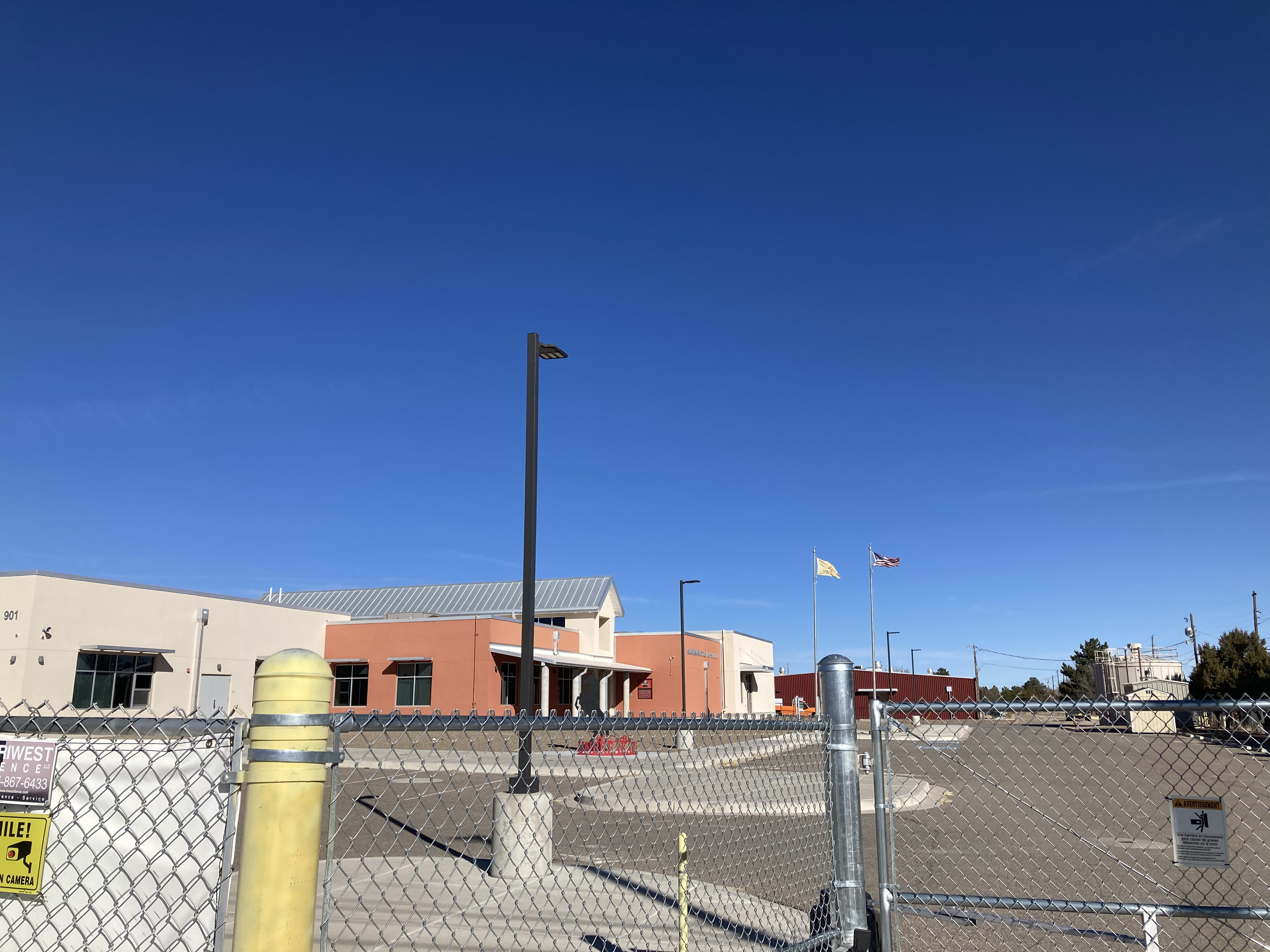
Mountainair Middle School

Its school district is Mountainair Public Schools.

== Notable person ==
Francine Neff, the 35th Treasurer of the United States, grew up on a small vegetable farm outside Mountainair.
