= List of census-designated places in New Mexico =

Map of the United States with New Mexico highlighted

New Mexico is a state located in the Western United States. New Mexico has several census-designated places (CDPs) which are unincorporated communities lacking elected municipal officers and boundaries with legal status.

== List of census-designated places ==
Place	County	Category
Abeytas	Socorro	CDP
Abiquiú	Rio Arriba	CDP
Abo	Torrance	Unincorporated
Acomita Lake	Cibola	CDP
Adelino	Valencia	CDP
Agua Fria	Santa Fe	CDP
Alamillo	Socorro	CDP
Alamo	Socorro	CDP
Alaska	Cibola	Unincorporated
Alcalde	Rio Arriba	CDP
Algodones	Sandoval	CDP
Alma	Catron	CDP
Alto	Lincoln	Unincorporated
Amalia	Taos	Unincorporated
Amistad	Union	Unincorporated
Animas	Hidalgo	CDP
Angustura	San Juan	CDP
Antelope Wells	Hidalgo	Unincorporated
Anton Chico	Guadalupe	CDP
Anzac Village	Cibola	CDP
Apache Creek	Catron	CDP
Arabela	Lincoln	Unincorporated
Aragon	Catron	CDP
Arch	Roosevelt	Unincorporated
Arenas Valley	Grant	CDP
Arrey	Sierra	CDP
Arroyo Hondo	Santa Fe	CDP
Arroyo Hondo	Taos	CDP
Arroyo Seco	Taos	CDP
Atoka	Eddy	CDP
Bard	Quay	Unincorporated
Beclabito	San Juan	CDP
Bellview	Curry	Unincorporated
Bent	Otero	CDP
Berino	Doña Ana	CDP
Bernardo	Socorro	Unincorporated
Bethel	Roosevelt	Unincorporated
Bibo	Cibola	CDP
Black Rock	McKinley	CDP
Blanco	San Juan	CDP
Bluewater	Lincoln	CDP
Bluewater Acres	Cibola	CDP
Bluewater Village	Cibola	CDP
Boles Acres	Otero	CDP
Borrego Pass	McKinley	CDP
Bosque	Valencia	Unincorporated
Brazos	Rio Arriba	CDP
Brilliant	Colfax	Unincorporated
Brimhall Nizhoni	McKinley	CDP
Broadview	Cibola	CDP
Buckhorn	Grant	CDP
Buena Vista	Mora	Unincorporated
Butterfield Park	Doña Ana	CDP
Caballo	Sierra	CDP
Cañada de los Alamos	Santa Fe	CDP
Candy Kitchen	Cibola	CDP
Canjilon	Rio Arriba	CDP
Cañon	Sandoval	CDP
Cannon AFB	Curry	CDP
Cañoncito	Bernalillo	Unincorporated
Canoncito	Mora	Unincorporated
Cañoncito	Rio Arriba	Unincorporated
Canoncito	San Miguel	Unincorporated
Cañoncito	Santa Fe	Unincorporated
Cañoncito	Taos	Unincorporated
Cañones	Rio Arriba	CDP
Canova	Rio Arriba	CDP
Caprock	Lea	Unincorporated
Capulin	Union	CDP
Carnuel	Bernalillo	CDP
Carson	Taos	Unincorporated
Casa Blanca	Cibola	Unincorporated
Casa Colorada	Valencia	CDP
Casas Adobes	Grant	CDP
Catalpa Canyon	McKinley	CDP
Cebolla	Rio Arriba	Unincorporated
Cedar Crest	Bernalillo	CDP
Cedar Grove	Santa Fe	CDP
Cedar Hill	San Juan	CDP
Cedarvale	Torrance	Unincorporated
Cedro	Bernalillo	CDP
Center Point	San Juan	CDP
Cerro	Taos	Unincorporated
Chacon	Mora	Unincorporated
Chamberino	Doña Ana	CDP
Chamisal	Taos	CDP
Chamita	Rio Arriba	CDP
Chamizal	Socorro	CDP
Chaparral	Doña Ana; Otero	CDP
Chi Chil Tah	McKinley	Unincorporated
Chical	Valencia	CDP
Chili	Rio Arriba	CDP
Chilili	Bernalillo	CDP
Chimayó	Río Arriba; Santa Fe	CDP
Chloride	Sierra	Unincorporated
Chupadero	Santa Fe	CDP
Church Rock	McKinley	CDP
City of the Sun	Luna	CDP
Claunch	Socorro	Unincorporated
Cleveland	Mora	Unincorporated
Cliff	Grant	CDP
Clines Corners	Torrance	Unincorporated
Cobre	Grant	CDP
Cochiti	Sandoval	CDP
Cochiti Lake	Sandoval	CDP
Colonias	Guadalupe	Unincorporated
Conchas Dam	San Miguel	CDP
Conejo	Santa Fe	CDP
Continental Divide	McKinley	Unincorporated
Cordova	Rio Arriba	CDP
Costilla	Taos	CDP
Cotton City	Hidalgo	CDP
Counselor	Sandoval	Unincorporated
Coyote	Lincoln	Unincorporated
Coyote	Rio Arriba	CDP
Crestview	McKinley	CDP
Crossroads	Lea	Unincorporated
Crouch Mesa	San Juan	CDP
Crownpoint	McKinley	CDP
Cruzville	Catron	CDP
Crystal	McKinley; San Juan	CDP
Cuartelez	Santa Fe	CDP
Cubero	Cibola	CDP
Cuchillo	Sierra	Unincorporated
Cuervo	Guadalupe	Unincorporated
Cundiyo	Santa Fe	CDP
Cuyamungue	Santa Fe	CDP
Cuyamungue Grant	Santa Fe	CDP
Datil	Catron	CDP
Deer Canyon	Torrance	CDP
Delphos	Roosevelt	Unincorporated
Derry	Sierra	Unincorporated
Dixon	Rio Arriba	CDP
Doña Ana	Doña Ana	CDP
Dulce	Rio Arriba	CDP
Duran	Torrance	CDP
Dwyer	Grant	Unincorporated
East Pecos	San Miguel	CDP
Edith Endave	Bernalillo	CDP
El Cerro	Valencia	CDP
El Cerro Mission	Valencia	CDP
El Duende	Rio Arriba	CDP
El Prado	Taos	Unincorporated
El Rancho	Santa Fe	CDP
El Rito	Cibola	Unincorporated
El Rito	Rio Arriba	CDP
El Rito	Taos	Unincorporated
El Valle de Arroyo Seco	Santa Fe	CDP
Eldorado at Santa Fe	Santa Fe	CDP
Embudo	Rio Arriba	Unincorporated
Encantado	Santa Fe	CDP
Encinal	Cibola	CDP
Engle	Sierra	Unincorporated
Ensenada	Rio Arriba	CDP
Escondida	Socorro	CDP
Escudilla Bonita	Catron	CDP
Fairacres	Doña Ana	CDP
Faywood	Grant	CDP
Fence Lake	Cibola	CDP
Flora Vista	San Juan	CDP
Forrest	Quay	Unincorporated
Fort Bayard	Grant	Unincorporated
Fort Wingate	McKinley	CDP
Fruitland	San Juan	Unincorporated
Galisteo	Santa Fe	CDP
Gallina	Rio Arriba	CDP
Gamerco	McKinley	CDP
Garfield	Doña Ana	CDP
Garita	San Miguel	Unincorporated
Garrison	Roosevelt	Unincorporated
Gila	Grant	CDP
Gila Hot Springs	Grant	CDP
Gladstone	Union	Unincorporated
Glen Acres	Hidalgo	CDP
Glencoe	Lincoln	Unincorporated
Glenrio	Quay	Unincorporated
Glenwood	Catron	CDP
Glorieta	Santa Fe	CDP
Golden	Santa Fe	CDP
Golden Acres	Cibola	CDP
Golondrinas	Mora	Unincorporated
Guadalupita	Mora	Unincorporated
Hachita	Grant	CDP
Hanover	Grant	CDP
Happy Valley	Eddy	CDP
Haystack	McKinley	CDP
Hernandez	Rio Arriba	CDP
High Rolls	Otero	CDP
Highland Meadows	Valencia	CDP
Hillsboro	Sierra	CDP
Hot Springs Landing	Sierra	CDP
Holloman AFB	Otero	CDP
Holman	Mora	Unincorporated
Homer C Jones	McKinley	CDP
Homestead	Catron	CDP
Hondo	Lincoln	Unincorporated
Hortonville	Otero	Unincorporated
Hyde Park	Santa Fe	CDP
Ilfeld	San Miguel	Unincorporated
Indian Hills	Torrance	CDP
Inez	Roosevelt	Unincorporated
Isleta Pueblo	Bernalillo	Unincorporated
Isleta Village Proper	Bernalillo	CDP
Iyanbito	McKinley	CDP
Jacona	Santa Fe	CDP
Jaconita	Santa Fe	CDP
Jamestown	McKinley	CDP
Jarales	Valencia	CDP
Jemez Pueblo	Sandoval	CDP
Jicarilla	Lincoln	Unincorporated
Keeler Farm	Luna	CDP
Kenna	Roosevelt	Unincorporated
Kermit	Roosevelt	Unincorporated
Kewa Pueblo	Sandoval	Unincorporated
Kingston	Sierra	CDP
Kirtland	San Juan	Unincorporated
Kirtland AFB	Bernalillo	CDP
La Bajada	Santa Fe	CDP
La Boca	San Juan	CDP
La Cienega	Santa Fe	CDP
La Cueva	Mora	CDP
La Cueva	Sandoval	CDP
La Cueva	Santa Fe	CDP
La Hacienda	Luna	CDP
La Huerta	Eddy	CDP
La Jara	Sandoval	CDP
La Joya	Socorro	CDP
La Loma	Santa Fe	Unincorporated
La Luz	Otero	CDP
La Madera	Rio Arriba	CDP
La Madera	Sandoval	CDP
La Mesa	Doña Ana	CDP
La Mesilla	Rio Arriba	CDP
La Plata	San Juan	CDP
La Puebla	Santa Fe	CDP
La Tierra	Santa Fe	CDP
La Union	Doña Ana	CDP
La Villita	Rio Arriba	CDP
Laguna	Cibola	CDP
Lake Roberts	Grant	CDP
Lake Roberts Heights	Grant	CDP
Lake Sumner	De Baca	CDP
Lake Valley	San Juan	CDP
Lakewood	Eddy	Unincorporated
Lamy	Santa Fe	CDP
Las Campanas	Santa Fe	CDP
Las Maravillas	Valencia	CDP
Las Nutrias	Socorro	CDP
Las Palomas	Sierra	CDP
Las Tablas	Rio Arriba	Unincorporated
Las Trampas	Taos	Unincorporated
Las Tusas	Cibola	CDP
Lee Acres	San Juan	CDP
Lemitar	Socorro	CDP
Lincoln	Lincoln	Unincorporated
Lindrith	Rio Arriba	CDP
Lingo	Roosevelt	Unincorporated
Little Walnut Village	Grant	CDP
Livingston Wheeler	Eddy	CDP
Llano	Taos	Unincorporated
Llano del Medio	Guadalupe	CDP
Lobo Canyon	Cibola	CDP
Loco Hills	Eddy	CDP
Los Alamos	Los Alamos	CDP
Los Cerrillos	Santa Fe	CDP
Los Chaves	Valencia	CDP
Los Luceros	Rio Arriba	CDP
Los Ojos	Rio Arriba	CDP
Lower Frisco	Catron	CDP
Luis Lopez	Socorro	CDP
Lumberton	Rio Arriba	CDP
Luna	Catron	CDP
Lybrook	Rio Arriba	CDP
Lyden	Rio Arriba	CDP
Madrid	Santa Fe	CDP
Madrone	Valencia	CDP
Malaga	Eddy	CDP
Maljamar	Lea	Unincorporated
Manzano	Torrance	CDP
Manzano Springs	Bernalillo; Torrance	CDP
Mayhill	Otero	CDP
McAlister	Quay	Unincorporated
McCartys Village	Cibola	CDP
McDonald	Lea	Unincorporated
McGaffey	McKinley	CDP
McIntosh	Torrance	CDP
Meadow Lake	Valencia	CDP
Medanales	Rio Arriba	CDP
Mescalero	Otero	CDP
Mesita	Cibola	CDP
Mesquite	Doña Ana	CDP
Miami	Colfax	Unincorporated
Middle Frisco	Catron	CDP
Middle Mesa	San Juan	CDP
Midway	Chaves	CDP
Mills	Harding	Unincorporated
Milnesand	Roosevelt	Unincorporated
Mimbres	Grant	CDP
Mogollon	Catron	CDP
Monterey Park	Valencia	CDP
Montezuma	San Miguel	Unincorporated
Monticello	Sierra	Unincorporated
Montoya	Quay	Unincorporated
Monument	Lea	CDP
Moquino	Cibola	CDP
Mora	Mora	CDP
Morningside	Eddy	CDP
Mount Dora	Union	Unincorporated
Mount Taylor	Cibola	CDP
Mountain Park	Otero	Unincorporated
Mountain View	Chaves	Unincorporated
Mountain View	Cibola	CDP
Mountain View	Luna	CDP
Mouser Place	Hidalgo	Unincorporated
Mule Creek	Grant	Unincorporated
Nadine	Lea	CDP
Nageezi	San Juan	CDP
Nakaibito	McKinley	CDP
Nambe	Santa Fe	CDP
Napi HQ	San Juan	CDP
Nara Visa	Quay	CDP
Naschitti	San Juan	CDP
Navajo	McKinley	CDP
Navajo City	Rio Arriba	Unincorporated
Navajo Dam	San Juan	CDP
Nenahnezad	San Juan	CDP
New Laguna	Cibola	Unincorporated
Newcomb	San Juan	CDP
Newkirk	Guadalupe	CDP
Newman	Otero	Unincorporated
No Agua	Taos	Unincorporated
Nogal	Lincoln	CDP
North Acomita Village	Cibola	CDP
North Hobbs	Lea	CDP
North Hurley	Grant	CDP
North Light Plant	San Juan	CDP
North San Ysidro	San Miguel	CDP
North Valley	Bernalillo	CDP
Oasis	Sierra	CDP
Ocate	Mora	Unincorporated
Ohkay Owingeh	Rio Arriba	CDP
Ojo Amarillo	San Juan	CDP
Ojo Caliente	Taos	CDP
Ojo Encino	McKinley	CDP
Ojo Feliz	Mora	Unincorporated
Ojo Sarco	Rio Arriba	CDP
Old Horse Springs	Catron	Unincorporated
Old Town	Luna	CDP
Organ	Doña Ana	CDP
Orogrande	Otero	CDP
Paa-Ko	Bernalillo	CDP
Paguate	Cibola	CDP
Pajarito Mesa	Bernalillo	CDP
Paradise Hills	Bernalillo	CDP
Paraje	Cibola	CDP
Pastura	Guadalupe	CDP
Peak Place	Santa Fe	CDP
Pecan Park	Luna	CDP
Peña Blanca	Sandoval	CDP
Peñasco	Taos	CDP
Pep	Roosevelt	Unincorporated
Petaca	Rio Arriba	Unincorporated
Picacho	Lincoln	Unincorporated
Picacho Hills	Doña Ana	CDP
Picuris Pueblo	Taos	CDP
Pie Town	Catron	CDP
Pilar	Taos	Unincorporated
Pinedale	McKinley	CDP
Pinehaven	McKinley	CDP
Pinehill	Cibola	CDP
Piñon	Otero	CDP
Piños Altos	Grant	CDP
Placitas	Doña Ana	CDP
Placitas	Sandoval	CDP
Playas	Hidalgo	CDP
Pleasanton	Catron	CDP
Pojoaque	Santa Fe	CDP
Polvadera	Socorro	CDP
Ponderosa	Sandoval	CDP
Ponderosa Pine	Bernalillo	CDP
Prewitt	McKinley	CDP
Progresso	Torrance	Unincorporated
Pueblito	Rio Arriba	CDP
Pueblitos	Valencia	CDP
Pueblo	San Miguel	CDP
Pueblo of Sandia Village	Sandoval	CDP
Pueblo Pintado	McKinley	CDP
Puerto de Luna	Guadalupe	CDP
Pulpotio Bareas	Luna	CDP
Punta de Agua	Torrance	CDP
Purty Rock	McKinley	CDP
Quay	Quay	Unincorporated
Queen	Eddy	Unincorporated
Quemado	Catron	CDP
Radium Springs	Doña Ana	CDP
Rainsville	Mora	Unincorporated
Ramah	McKinley	CDP
Rancho Grande	Catron	CDP
Ranchos de Taos	Taos	CDP
Rayado	Colfax	Unincorporated
Redrock	Grant	CDP
Regina	Sandoval	CDP
Rehoboth	McKinley	Unincorporated
Ribera	San Miguel	CDP
Richland	Roosevelt	Unincorporated
Rincón	Doña Ana	CDP
Rio Chiquito	Santa Fe	CDP
Rio en Medio	Santa Fe	CDP
Rio Lucio	Taos	CDP
Rio Rancho Estates	Sandoval	CDP
Rivers	Catron	CDP
Riverside	Eddy	Unincorporated
Riverside	Lincoln	Unincorporated
Riverside	San Juan	Unincorporated
Road Forks	Hidalgo	Unincorporated
Rociada	San Miguel	Unincorporated
Rock Springs	McKinley	CDP
Rodeo	Hidalgo	CDP
Rodey	Doña Ana	CDP
Rogers	Roosevelt	Unincorporated
Rosedale	Grant	CDP
Rowe	San Miguel	CDP
Rutheron	Rio Arriba	Unincorporated
Sabinal	Socorro	Unincorporated
Sacramento	Otero	CDP
Sagar	McKinley	CDP
Salem	Doña Ana	CDP
San Acacia	Socorro	CDP
San Antonio	Socorro	CDP
San Antonito	Bernalillo	CDP
San Antonito	Socorro	CDP
San Cristobal	Taos	CDP
Santa Fe Foothills	Santa Fe	CDP
San Felipe Pueblo	Sandoval	CDP
San Fidel	Cibola	CDP
San Francisco Plaza	Catron	Unincorporated
San Ildefonso Pueblo	Santa Fe	CDP
San Jose	Rio Arriba	CDP
San Jose	San Miguel	CDP
San Juan	Rio Arriba	CDP
San Lorenzo	Grant	CDP
San Lorenzo	Rio Arriba	Unincorporated
San Luis	Sandoval	CDP
San Mateo	Cibola	CDP
San Miguel	Doña Ana	CDP
San Pablo	Doña Ana	CDP
San Patricio	Lincoln	Unincorporated
San Pedro	Santa Fe	CDP
San Rafael	Cibola	CDP
San Ysidro	Doña Ana	CDP
Sandia Heights	Bernalillo	CDP
Sandia Knolls	Bernalillo	CDP
Sandia Park	Bernalillo	CDP
Sanostee	San Juan	CDP
Santa Ana Pueblo	Sandoval	CDP
Santa Clara Pueblo	Rio Arriba	CDP
Santa Cruz	Santa Fe	CDP
Santa Teresa	Doña Ana	CDP
Santo Domingo Pueblo	Sandoval	CDP
Sapello	San Miguel	Unincorporated
Sausal	Valencia	CDP
Seama	Cibola	CDP
Seboyeta	Cibola	CDP
Sedan	Union	Unincorporated
Sedillo	Bernalillo	CDP
Sena	San Miguel	CDP
Seneca	Union	Unincorporated
Separ	Grant	Unincorporated
Serafina	San Miguel	Unincorporated
Seton Village	Santa Fe	CDP
Sheep Springs	San Juan	CDP
Sherman	Grant	Unincorporated
Shiprock	San Juan	CDP
Skyline-Ganipa	Cibola	CDP
Smith Lake	McKinley	Unincorporated
Sofia	Union	Unincorporated
Soham	San Miguel	CDP
Solano	Harding	Unincorporated
Sombrillo	Santa Fe	CDP
South Acomita Village	Cibola	CDP
South Valley	Bernalillo	CDP
Spencerville	San Juan	CDP
St. Vrain	Curry	Unincorporated
Stanley	Santa Fe	CDP
Stoneridge	Cibola	CDP
Sundance	McKinley	CDP
Sunny Side	Colfax	Unincorporated
Sunlit Hills	Santa Fe	CDP
Sunshine	Luna	CDP
Sunspot	Otero	Unincorporated
Taiban	De Baca	Unincorporated
Tajique	Torrance	CDP
Talpa	Taos	CDP
Tano Road	Santa Fe	CDP
Taos Pueblo	Taos	CDP
Tecolote	San Miguel	CDP
Tecolotito	San Miguel	CDP
Tererro	San Miguel	Unincorporated
Tesuque	Santa Fe	CDP
Tesuque Pueblo	Santa Fe	CDP
Thoreau	McKinley	CDP
Three Rivers	Otero	Unincorporated
Thunder Mountain	Santa Fe	CDP
Tierra Amarilla	Rio Arriba	CDP
Timberlake	Cibola; McKinley	CDP
Timberon	Otero	CDP
Tinnie	Lincoln	Unincorporated
Tohatchi	McKinley	CDP
Tome	Valencia	CDP
Torreon	Sandoval	CDP
Torreon	Torrance	CDP
Tortugas	Doña Ana	CDP
Totah Vista	San Juan	CDP
Trementina	San Miguel	Unincorporated
Tres Arroyos	Santa Fe	CDP
Tres Piedras	Taos	Unincorporated
Trout Valley	Grant	CDP
Truchas	Rio Arriba	CDP
Tse Bonito	McKinley	CDP
Turley	San Juan	CDP
Twin Forks	Otero	CDP
Twin Lakes	McKinley	CDP
Tyrone	Grant	CDP
University Park	Doña Ana	CDP
Upham	Sierra	Unincorporated
Upper Fruitland	San Juan	CDP
Upton	Roosevelt	Unincorporated
Ute Park	Colfax	CDP
Vadito	Taos	CDP
Vado	Doña Ana	CDP
Valdez	Taos	Unincorporated
Valencia	Santa Fe	CDP
Valencia	Valencia	CDP
Valle Vista	Santa Fe	CDP
Vallecitos	Rio Arriba	Unincorporated
Valmora	Mora	Unincorporated
Vanderwagen	McKinley	CDP
Veguita	Socorro	CDP
Velarde	Rio Arriba	CDP
Ventura	Luna	CDP
Villanueva	San Miguel	CDP
Wagon Wheel	Torrance	Unincorporated
Waldo	Santa Fe	Unincorporated
Waterflow	San Juan	CDP
Watrous	Mora	CDP
Weed	Otero	CDP
West Hammond	San Juan	CDP
Wheatland	Quay	Unincorporated
White Cliffs	McKinley	CDP
White Rock	Los Alamos	CDP
White Rock	San Juan	Unincorporated
White Sands	Doña Ana	CDP
White Signal	Grant	CDP
Whites City	Eddy	CDP
Williams Acres	McKinley	CDP
Windmill	Hidalgo	CDP
Winston	Sierra	CDP
Yah-ta-hey	McKinley	CDP
Yerba	Roosevelt	Unincorporated
Yeso	De Baca	Unincorporated
Youngsville	Rio Arriba	CDP
Zia Pueblo	Sandoval	CDP
Zuni Pueblo	McKinley	CDP
Zuzax	Bernalillo	Unincorporated

== Former census-designated places ==
Place	County
Huerfano	San Juan
Llano Quemado	Taos
Los Trujillos-Gabaldon	Valencia
Río Chiquito	Santa Fe
Rio Communities North	Valencia

== See also ==
- List of cities in the United States
