= Acomita =

Acomita is a place name in the southwestern United States and may refer to:

- Acomita, within South Acomita Village, New Mexico
- Acomita Lake, New Mexico
- North Acomita Village, New Mexico
- Acomita Pueblo, a farming colony of Acoma Pueblo on the south bank of Rio San Jose
