= Barton, New Mexico =

- Census-designated place
- Location within New Mexico Location within the United States
- Coordinates: 35°03′48″N 106°14′48″W
- Country: United States
- State: New Mexico
- Counties: Bernalillo; Santa Fe

Area
  - Total: 9.16 sq mi (23.72 km^{2})
  - Land: 9.16 sq mi (23.72 km^{2})
  - Water: 0 sq mi (0.00 km^{2})
- Elevation: 6,847 ft (2,087 m)

Population (2020)
  - Total: 1,282
  - Density: 140.0/sq mi (54.06/km^{2})
- Time zone: UTC-7 (Mountain (MST))
  - Summer (DST): UTC-6 (MDT)
- ZIP Code: 87015 (Edgewood); 87059 (Tijeras)
- Area code: 505
- FIPS code: 35-06220
- GNIS feature ID: 2806682

Barton is a census-designated place (CDP) in Bernalillo and Santa Fe counties, New Mexico, United States. It was first listed as a CDP prior to the 2020 census. As of the 2020 census, Barton had a population of 1,282.

Barton is in eastern Bernalillo County and the southwest corner of Santa Fe County. It is bordered to the east by the town of Edgewood and to the northwest by Sedillo. Interstate 40 forms the northern border of the community, leading west 25 miles (40 km) to Albuquerque and east 90 miles (140 km) to Santa Rosa. New Mexico State Road 217 crosses Barton from its start at I-40 and leads south 7 miles (11 km) to New Mexico State Road 222 near Manzano Springs.

== Demographics ==
Historical population
Census	Pop.	Note	%±
2020	1,282		—
U.S. Decennial Census

== Education ==
All parts of Barton, in both counties, are zoned to Moriarty Municipal Schools.
