= Alaska, New Mexico =

- Unincorporated community
- Location within the state of New Mexico Alaska (the United States)
- Coordinates: 35°3′10″N 107°35′46″W
- Country: United States
- State: New Mexico
- County: Cibola
- Elevation: 6,060 ft (1,850 m)
- Time zone: UTC-7 (Mountain (MST))
  - Summer (DST): UTC-6 (MDT)
- ZIP codes: 87034
- Area code: 505
- GNIS feature ID: 898716

Alaska is a populated place in Cibola County, New Mexico, United States. It is located two miles west of Acomita Lake. Alaska was formerly a railroad station. It first appeared on the map in 1905.

== Education ==
It is zoned to the Grants/Cibola County Schools.

== See also ==
- Acomita Lake, New Mexico
- North Acomita Village, New Mexico
- Skyline-Ganipa, New Mexico
