= Dune Dam =

Dune Dam is a long sand dune that lies at the western end of Chaco Canyon, New Mexico, near the confluence of the Chaco and Escavada Washs. The dune was created by winds that brought sand up the Chaco River. When the dune was large enough, it dammed the Chaco Wash and created a small and shallow lake near the Ancestral Puebloan great house, Penasco Blanco. Archeological evidence suggests that the dune was breached around 900 CE. Chacoans filled the breach with masonry sometime in the early 11th century, and built an accompanying reservoir lined with stones that was visible until 1920. The dam stopped Chaco Wash from further deepening, which helped raise the water table in the canyon, aiding Chacoan farming. The absence of a lacustrine plain behind the dam led geologist Stephen A. Hall to question this interpretation.
