= Homer Jones =

Homer Jones may refer to:

- Homer Jones (politician) (1893–1970), American politician
- Homer Jones (American football) (1941–2023), American football wide receiver
- Homer Jones (economist) (1906–1986), American economist

== See also ==
- Homer C Jones, New Mexico, an unincorporated community
