= Arroyo Hondo, New Mexico =

There are two locations named Arroyo Hondo in the U.S. state of New Mexico:

- Arroyo Hondo, Santa Fe County, New Mexico
- Arroyo Hondo, Taos County, New Mexico
