= Thunder Mountain, New Mexico =

- Census-designated place
- Location within New Mexico Location within the United States
- Coordinates: 35°06′44″N 106°13′34″W
- Country: United States
- State: New Mexico
- County: Santa Fe

Area
  - Total: 4.42 sq mi (11.46 km^{2})
  - Land: 4.42 sq mi (11.45 km^{2})
  - Water: 0.0039 sq mi (0.01 km^{2})
- Elevation: 6,687 ft (2,038 m)

Population (2020)
  - Total: 1,171
  - Density: 264.9/sq mi (102.27/km^{2})
- Time zone: UTC-7 (Mountain (MST))
  - Summer (DST): UTC-6 (MDT)
- ZIP Code: 87015 (Edgewood)
- Area code: 505
- FIPS code: 35-77635
- GNIS feature ID: 2806774

Thunder Mountain is an unincorporated community and census-designated place (CDP) in Santa Fe County, New Mexico, United States. It was first listed as a CDP prior to the 2020 census. As of the 2020 census, Thunder Mountain had a population of 1,171.

The CDP is in southwestern Santa Fe County. It is bordered to the north and east by the city of Edgewood, to the south by Barton, and to the west by Bernalillo County. Interstate 40 forms the southern border of the CDP, with access from Exit 187 to the east in Edgewood and from Exit 181 to the west in Sedillo. I-40 leads west 25 miles (40 km) to Albuquerque and east 90 miles (140 km) to Santa Rosa.

== Demographics ==
Historical population
Census	Pop.	Note	%±
2020	1,171		—
U.S. Decennial Census

== Education ==
It is within Moriarty-Edgewood School District.
