= New Mexico State Road 217 =

State highway in New Mexico, United States

State Road 217

Route information
- Maintained by NMDOT
- Length: 10.545 mi (16.971 km)

Major junctions
- South end: NM 337 in Yrisarri
- North end: NM 333 / Historic US 66 east of Sedillo

Location
- Country: United States
- State: New Mexico
- Counties: Bernalillo

Highway system
- New Mexico State Highway System; Interstate; US; State; Scenic
← NM 216	→ NM 218

State Road 217 (NM 217) is a state highway in the US state of New Mexico. Its total length is approximately 10.545 miles (16.971 km). NM 217's southern terminus is in the village of Yrisarri, at NM 337 and NM 217's northern terminus is at NM 333 east of Sedillo.

== Major intersections ==
The entire route is in Bernalillo County.

Location	mi	km	Destinations	Notes
	0.000	0.000	NM 337	Southern terminus
	10.545	16.971	NM 333 / Historic US 66	Northern terminus
1.000 mi = 1.609 km; 1.000 km = 0.621 mi
