= Gila Cliff Dwellings National Monument =

- U.S. National Register of Historic Places
- U.S. Historic district
- U.S. National Monument
- NM State Register of Cultural Properties
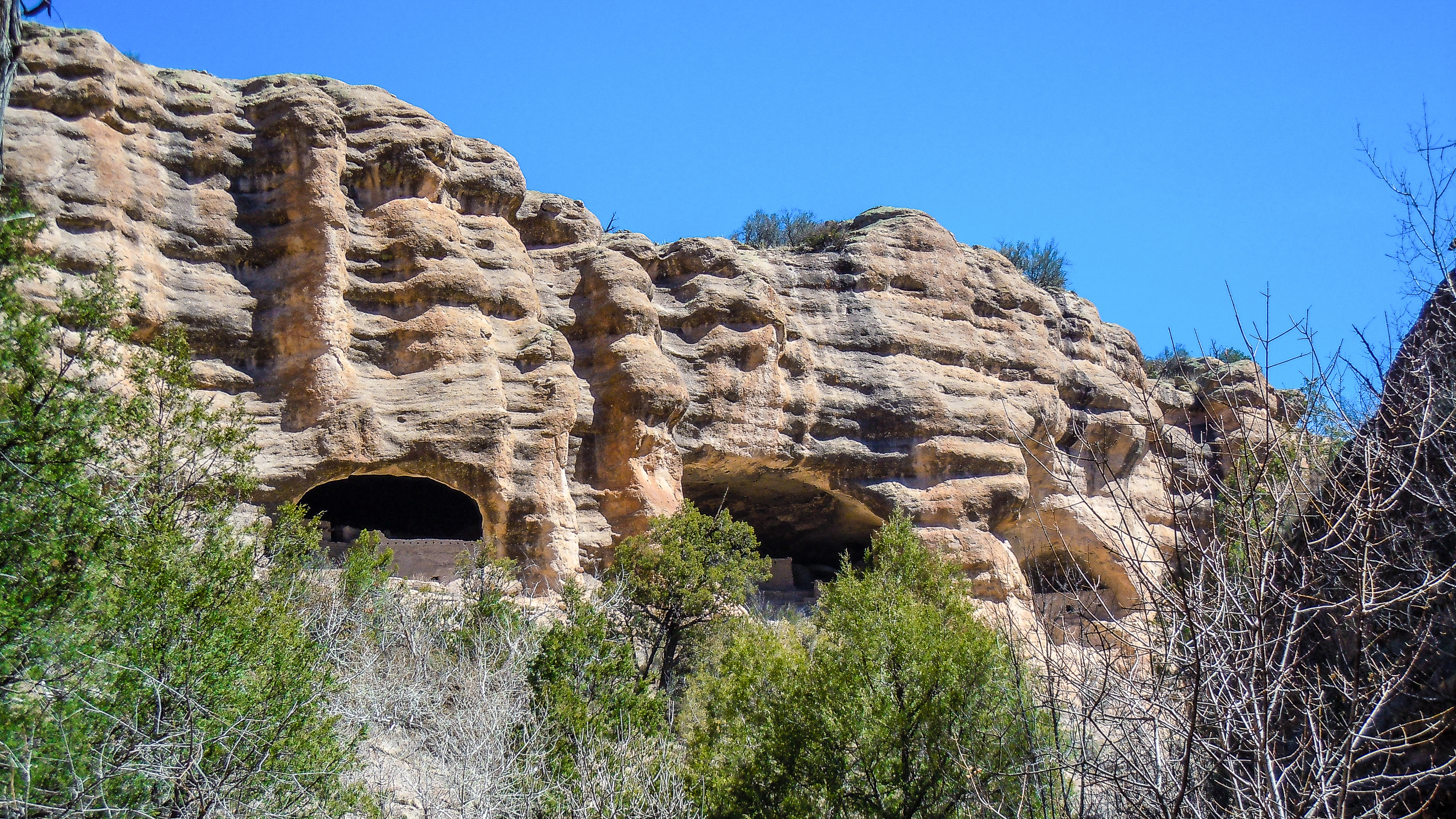
- Gila Cliff Dwellings as seen from a gorge below

- Location within New Mexico Location within the United States
- Interactive map of Gila Cliff Dwellings National Monument
- Nearest city: Silver City, New Mexico
- Coordinates: 33°13′38″N 108°16′20″W
- Area: 533 acres (216 ha)
- Visitation: 34,438 (2025)
- Website: Gila Cliff Dwellings National Monument
- NRHP reference No.: 66000472
- NMSRCP No.: 63

Significant dates
- Added to NRHP: October 15, 1966
- Designated NMON: November 16, 1907
- Designated NMSRCP: May 21, 1971

Gila Cliff Dwellings National Monument is a U.S. National Monument created to protect Mogollon cliff dwellings in the Gila Wilderness on the headwaters of the Gila River in southwest New Mexico. The 533-acre (2.16 km^{2}) national monument was established by President Theodore Roosevelt through executive proclamation on November 16, 1907. It is located in the extreme southern portion of Catron County. Visitors can access the monument by traveling northbound from Silver City, New Mexico, 45 miles (72 km) on NM 15.

== Cliff dwellings in New Mexico ==
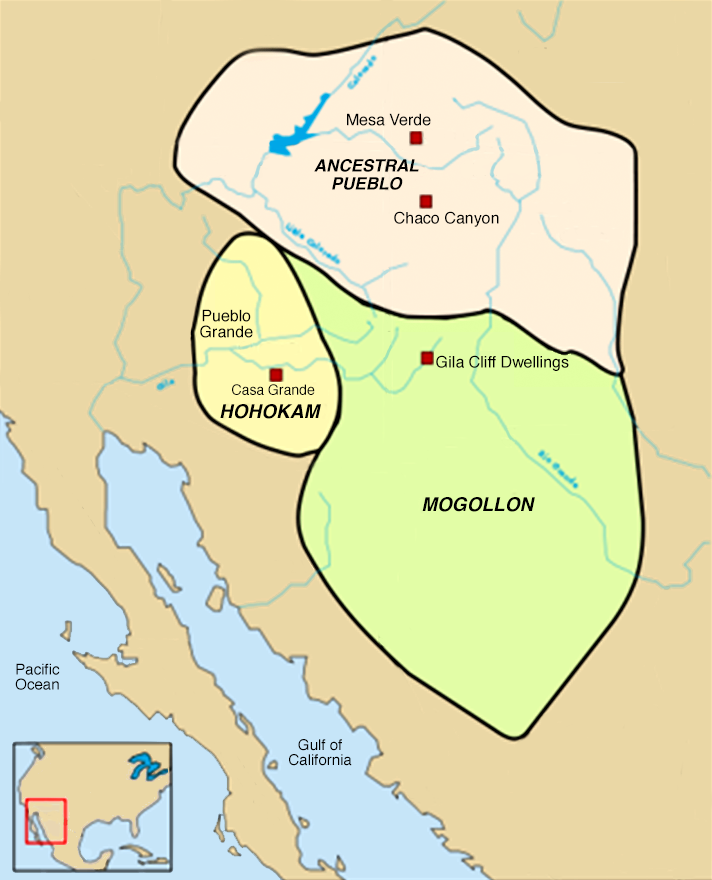
Map of major prehistoric Oasisamerica archaeological cultures

Considered by archaeologists to be upon the northernmost portion of the Mogollon people's sphere of influence, the Gila Cliff Dwellings National Monument is home to two prominent ruins sites among a collection of smaller sites located within the Gila Wilderness inside the Gila National Forest. The landscape in the monument ranges in elevation from around 5,700 to 7,300 feet (1,700 to 2,200 m) above sea level and follows the West Fork and the Middle Fork of the Gila River. The terrain around the ruins is rugged and arid, and contains steep-sided canyons cut by shallow spring rivers and mesas and bluffs forested with Ponderosa pine, Gambel's oak, Douglas fir, New Mexico juniper, pinon pine, and alligator juniper (among others). The area geologic history stems from the Oligocene epoch and volcanic activity that subsequently covered the area with ash. The monument's hot springs are remnants of this volcanic history.

The monument consists of 553 acres (2.24 km^{2}) and contains the remains of a Mimbres Culture community in various locations, two of which are most prominent. The namesake ruins' developers made use of natural caves to build interlinked dwellings within five cliff alcoves above Cliff Dweller Canyon. The TJ Ruins are located on a bluff overlooking the Gila River. The Mogollon peoples are believed to have inhabited the region from between 1275 and into the early 14th century, during the Pueblo III Era. It is not known why the community was abandoned.

Archaeologists have identified 46 rooms in the five caves on Cliff Dweller Canyon, and believe they were occupied by 10 to 15 families. The "Heart-Bar Site" or the TJ Ruins (named for the former ranch from which the mesa takes its name) located on TJ Mesa are largely un-excavated.

Other ruins include Javalina House, about 1/3 mile above the main ruin, West Fork Ruin, currently under Highway 15 across from Woody Corral, Three Mile Ruin along the west fork of the Gila River, and middle fork of the Gila River at the 11-room Cosgrove Ruin. Dendrochronology (tree ring dating) determined that the wood used in the dwellings were cut between 1276 and 1287. The region provided for growing, gathering and hunting food.

To visit the namesake dwellings, visitors are required to hike a well-traveled 1-mile-long (1.6 km) trail loop with several foot bridges over a stream. The entire walk takes about an hour. The hike begins at an elevation of 5,695 feet (1,736 m) and ends at 5,875 feet (1,791 m).

== Modern history ==
Though local Native American Indians were aware of the location of ruins, the first European contact with the Gila Cliff Dwellings was by Henry B. Ailman (an emigrant to New Mexico who was residing in Silver City at the time). In the summer of 1878, Ailman and several friends were summoned to serve for jury duty, and in an effort to avoid the summons, they organized a prospecting trip to the Gila River, where they subsequently came upon the site.

Throughout the following years, many visitors would study the dwellings. Soon the site became more accessible, and in the 1890s the Hill brothers had established a resort at the nearby Gila Hot Springs. The Hill brothers would begin the first tours to the ruins for their guests. In June 1906, Rep. John F. Lacey of Iowa and chairman of the House Public Lands Committee introduced a bill for the regulation of prehistoric sites. The Act for the Preservation of Antiquities, commonly known as the Antiquities Act, authorized the US president to set aside land that contained prehistoric and historic ruins by executive order.

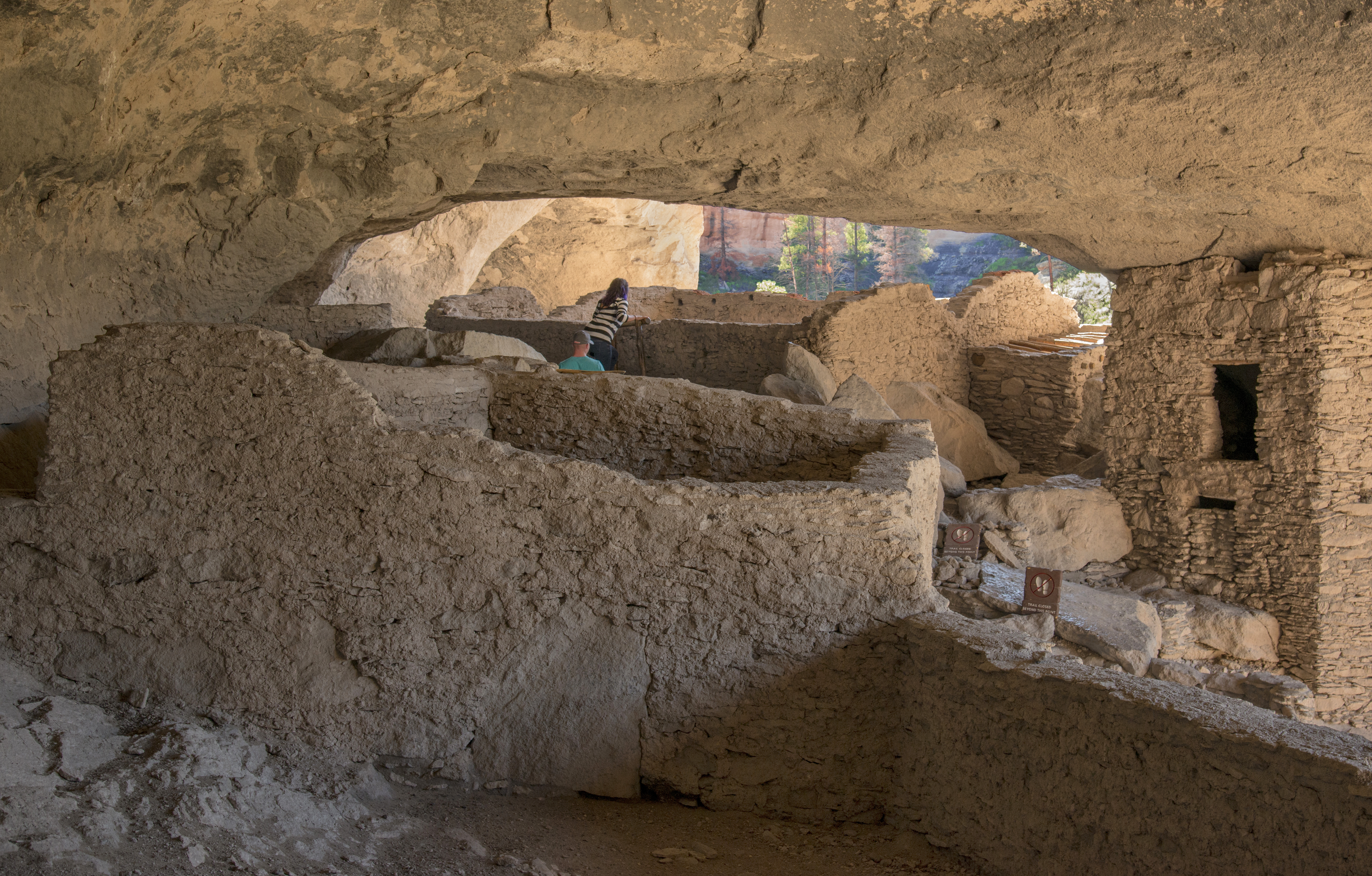
Gila Cliff Dwelling

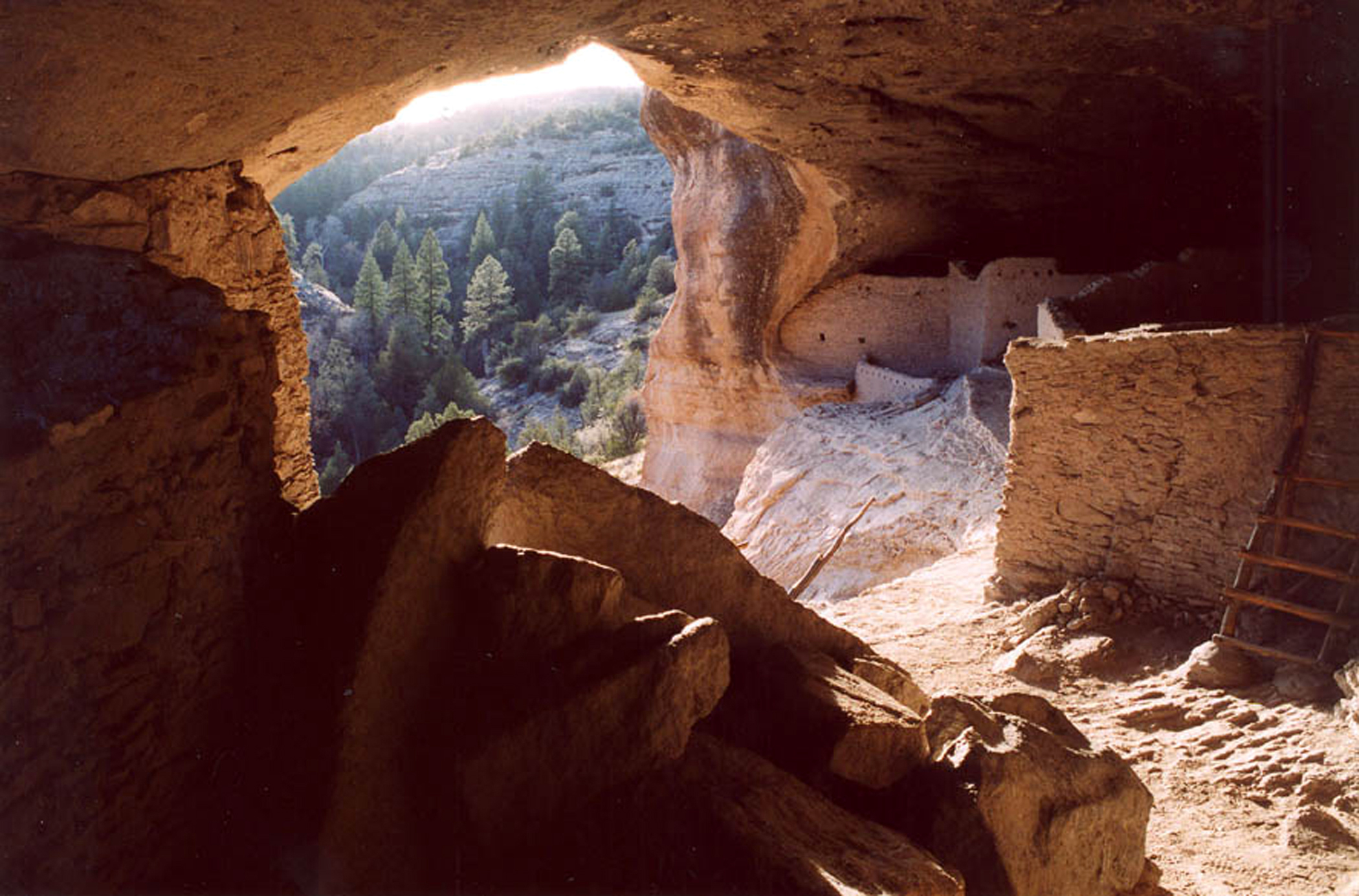
Looking out from one of the cave dwellings

These federal reservations were called national monuments and were to be managed by the Interior, Agriculture, and War departments, depending on which agency had controlled a particular site before it was withdrawn for preservation. In December 1906, Gila Forest Supervisor R. C. McClure reported to the chief forester in Washington, D.C. that the Gila Cliff Dwellings warranted preservation by the national government to avoid further removal of artifacts by hunters and other prospectors.

Several mummified bodies had been found at the Gila Cliff Dwellings location, though most were lost to looters and private collectors. In 1912, a burial ground was found; a mummified infant later referred to as "Zeke" was located. The discovery gained national attention and increased the monument's popularity and visitor numbers. In turn, additional improvements were made in the following years. The mummy is the only known mummy to be acquired by the Smithsonian from the monument. The first park ranger was Doc Campbell, an early settler to the region. He helped National Park Service crews stabilize the ruins. The Campbells still guide wilderness trips from their Campbells Post in nearby Gila Hot Springs.

Administration of the monument was transferred from the U.S. Department of Agriculture to the National Park Service on August 10, 1933, by Executive Order 6166. President Kennedy would later sign proclamation no. 3467, that added approximately 375 acres (1.52 km^{2}) and contained the TJ site, as well as additional wilderness area. In the spring of 1975, the National Park Service and the U.S. Forest Service signed a cooperative agreement where the Gila National Forest is responsible for administration of the monument, but it returned to the NPS in 2003.

== Monument exhibits and services ==
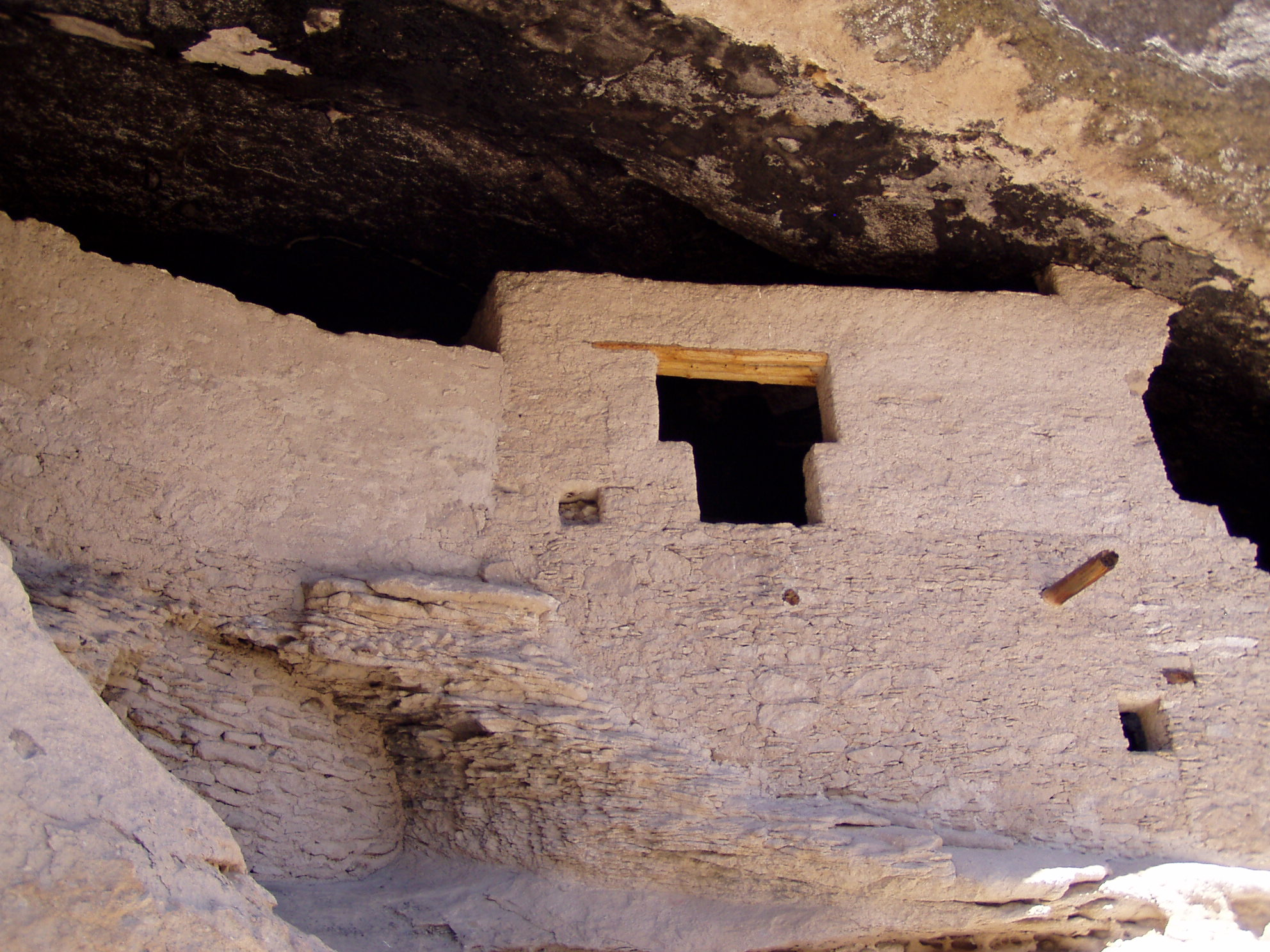
T-shaped doorway, common in precontact Southwestern stacked stone buildings

A museum and visitor center is located at the monument near the TJ Ruins. The visitor center is jointly operated by the U.S. Forest Service and the National Park Service. The museum hosts exhibits of Apache and Mogollon artifacts, uncovered both in the surrounding wilderness and at the monument. Displayed items include a bracelet crafted from Glycymeris Bittersweet clam shells found by a student park ranger, Charles Grymko. Believed to have been brought via trade from the Gulf of California to Snaketown (an ancient village on the right bank of the Gila River on the modern-day Gila River Indian Community south of the village of Ahwatukee), the shell eventually was etched and drilled by Hohokam artisans. The bracelet is believed then to have made its way up the Gila River from Arizona to the Gila River community, again by way of trade.

Other nearby attractions include hot springs, associated ruins sites, national forest hiking trails and fishing along the Gila River and in the Gila Wilderness.

== See also ==
- List of national monuments of the United States
- National Register of Historic Places listings in Catron County, New Mexico
