= Tyrone, New Mexico =

- Census-designated place
- Location within New Mexico Location within the United States
- Coordinates: 32°42′36″N 108°18′10″W
- Country: United States
- State: New Mexico
- County: Grant

Area
  - Total: 0.34 sq mi (0.87 km^{2})
  - Land: 0.34 sq mi (0.87 km^{2})
  - Water: 0 sq mi (0.00 km^{2})
- Elevation: 5,738 ft (1,749 m)

Population (2020)
  - Total: 712
  - Density: 2,122.7/sq mi (819.58/km^{2})
- Time zone: UTC-7 (Mountain (MST))
  - Summer (DST): UTC-6 (MDT)
- Area code: 575
- GNIS feature ID: 2584229

Tyrone is a census-designated place in Grant County, New Mexico, United States. It is named for County Tyrone in Ireland. Its population was 637 at the 2010 census and 712 at the 2020 census.

== Description ==
Tyrone is located 5 miles (8.0 km) northeast of the original town of Tyrone, which was destroyed by mining operations.

The townsite was built by the Phelps Dodge mining company (now Freeport-McMoRan) to house miners. Between 1968 and 1972, there were 320 homes built; four or five more have been added since then. A large commercial building at the entrance to the townsite (on Highway 90) housed a post office and a general mercantile (now closed). The townsite included a baseball field, children's park, and ten acres of a grassy 'picnic park'. Large homes with extensive views on the top of the ridge were referred to as Bosses Hill homes. In the 1990s, the mining company divested itself of the homes, which are now privately owned. As of August 2026, the townsite has undergone water system improvements.

== Demographics ==
Historical population
Census	Pop.	Note	%±
2020	712		—
U.S. Decennial Census

== See also ==
- List of census-designated places in New Mexico
