= Conchas Dam Historic District =

Historic district in New Mexico, United States

- U.S. National Register of Historic Places
- Location within New Mexico
- Location: Roughly bounded the State Park South Area, State Park North Area, Conchas Reservoir and Bell Ranch, Conchas Dam, New Mexico
- Coordinates: 35°23′00″N 104°11′47″W
- Area: 141.3 acres (57.2 ha)
- Built: 1935
- Built by: US Army Corps of Engineers; et al.
- Architectural style: Art Deco
- NRHP reference No.: 05000454
- Added to NRHP: May 22, 2005

The Conchas Dam Historic District, in Conchas Dam, New Mexico, is a 141.3 acres (57.2 ha) historic district which was listed on the National Register of Historic Places in 2005. The district is roughly bounded by the State Park South Area, State Park North Area, Conchas Reservoir, and Bell Ranch. It included six contributing buildings, 11 contributing structures, two contributing objects, and a contributing site.

Year of construction: 1935 Architect: US Army Corps of Engineers; et al. Architecture: Art Deco Historic function: Government; Recreation And Culture Historic subfunction: Public Works; Outdoor Recreation Criteria: event, architecture/engineering
