= Escavada Wash =

Tributary of the Chaco Wash in New Mexico

Coordinates: 36°05′55″N 107°52′49″W

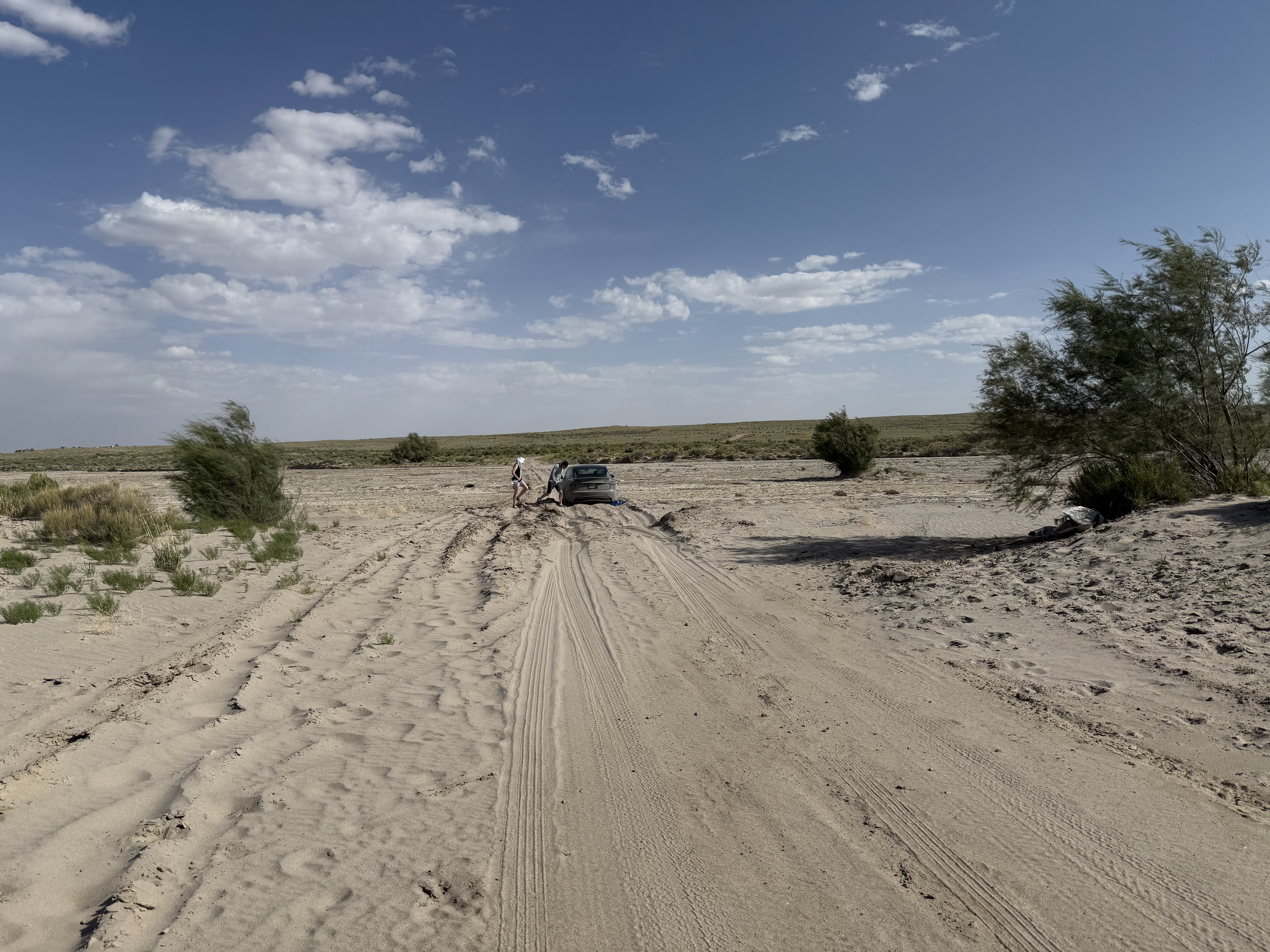
Driving across the Escavada Wash

Escavada Wash is a tributary of the Chaco Wash, in Chaco Canyon, New Mexico, United States. It flows south and west from its origin near Lybrook and meets the Chaco Wash at the west end of the canyon. Several small Ancestral Puebloan archeological sites border the wash, which is located north of the Chacoan great house Pueblo Alto.

== Bibliography ==
- Vivian, R. Gwinn; Hilpert, Bruce (2012). The Chaco Handbook: An Encyclopedic Guide (2 ed.). University of Utah Press. ISBN 978-1-60781-195-4.
