= Pecos Independent Schools =

Public school

Pecos Independent Schools (also known as the Pecos Independent School District) is a public school district based in Pecos, New Mexico, United States. The district covers a 383-square-mile (990 km^{2}) area in western San Miguel County.

The district's service area includes: Pecos, East Pecos, North San Ysidro, Rowe, and Soham.

== Schools ==
- Grades 6-12
  - Pecos Middle School & High School
- Grades PK-5
  - Pecos Elementary School

== Enrollment ==
- 2007-2008 School Year: 722 students
- 2006-2007 School Year: 748 students
- 2005-2006 School Year: 767 students
- 2004-2005 School Year: 828 students
- 2003-2004 School Year: 869 students
- 2002-2003 School Year: 859 students
- 2001-2002 School Year: 816 students
- 2000-2001 School Year: 889 students

== Demographics ==
There were a total of 1,795 students enrolled in Pecos Independent Schools during the 2007–2008 school year. The gender makeup of the district was 45.43% female and 54.57% male. The racial makeup of the district was 89.89% Hispanic, 8.17% White, 1.26% African American, 0.66% Native American, and 0.14% Asian/Pacific Islander.

== See also ==
- List of school districts in New Mexico
