= Alan Ebnother =

American painter

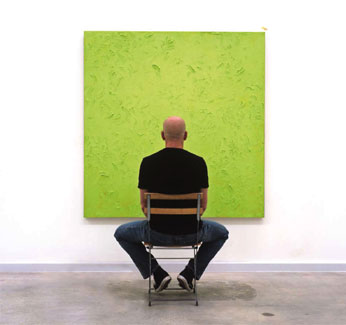
- Photographer Jennah Ward has extensively documented Ebnother's unique painting techniques.
- Born: December 26, 1952 (age 73); Alameda, California, United States
- Known for: Painting, drawing
- Movement: Monochrome painting, postminimalism, concrete art

Alan Ebnother (born December 26, 1952, Alameda, California, United States) is a contemporary American artist. His practice as an artist is usually associated with monochrome, concrete, modernist, post, color-based, radical, minimalist, and abstract painting.

== Life and work ==
Ebnother has been living and working in Stanley, New Mexico since 2000. He mixes and grinds his own pigments. His oils, in hand-ground dry pigment on stretched linen and wood panels, are characterized by rich impasto, dense pigmentation, and dense markings.

Ebnother trained as a ballet dancer. He has said that he considers painting and dance to be similar art forms: "Painting is a very sensual and tactile experience, as is dance. Both rely on instinctual decisions, with the critical eye entering and judging after the act.” His understanding of elevation, extension, and balance comes through in his dispersed composition and the agility of his paint handling. The high pigment-to-oil ratio and furrowed surfaces of these paintings combine to create an unusually saturated color with a grounded, concrete physicality. For a decade, he worked in monochromatic whites and greens, but his palette has diversified since 2008.

Solo exhibitions (retrospective): Paintings, Room for Painting Room for Paper. San Francisco, California (2009), Reduxion, Maria Elena Gonzalez- Alan Ebnother, Galerie Gisele Linder, Basel Switzerland (2009), Paintings on Paper, Imprints, Le Vieux Village, France (2008), Painting, Wade Wilson Art, Houston, Texas (2007), Small Paintings, Galerie Klaus Braun, Stuttgart, Germany (2008), Painting on Paper, Galerie Klaus Braun, Stuttgart, Germany (2003), Paintings, Charlotte Jackson Fine Art, Newport Beach, California (1999) New Paintings, Galerie Klaus Braun, Stuttgart, Germany (1998), Painting, Galerie Alf-Krister Job, Mainz, Germany (1998), Alan Ebnother, Charlotte Jackson Fine Art, Santa Fe, New Mexico (1997), Alan Ebnother, Galerie Orms, Innsbruck, Austrian (1997), Alan Ebnother-Kulturraum Kirche, Evangelische Kirche, Taunusstein-Bleidenstadt, Germany (1996).
