= Riverside, Grant County, New Mexico =

Unincorporated community in New Mexico, United States

- Unincorporated community
- Location within New Mexico Location within the United States
- Coordinates: 32°55′54″N 108°35′45″W
- Country: United States
- State: New Mexico
- County: Grant
- Elevation: 4,482 ft (1,366 m)
- Time zone: UTC-7 (MST)
  - Summer (DST): UTC-6 (MDT)
- ZIP code: 88028
- Area code: 575
- GNIS feature ID: 893985

Riverside is an unincorporated community in Grant County, New Mexico, United States. It lies on the left (east) bank of the Gila River and on both sides of U.S. Route 180 in southwestern New Mexico, 2.6 miles (4.2 km) by road south of Cliff.

== History ==
There was a Mimbres settlement at Riverside, but they were displaced by the Apache and the settlement had been long abandoned by the time the Spanish came to New Mexico. The Spanish did not settle in the area due to the presence of the Chiricahua Apache.

Riverside and the surrounding area in the Gila River Valley were settled by Anglos in 1884, as fear of Apache raiders decreased. The area was and is primarily a ranching and farming community. In 1900, Thomas Jefferson Clark built a two-story hotel in Riverside as a type of caravanserai for travellers on the stage route between Mogollon and Silver City.

The annual Audubon Gila River bird count takes place in Riverside. Students attend the schools in Cliff, which is part of the Silver Consolidated School District.
