= Moriarty-Edgewood School District =

School district in New Mexico

Moriarty-Edgewood School District (MESD), also known as Moriarty Municipal Schools, is a school district headquartered in unincorporated Torrance County, New Mexico, near Moriarty.

== History ==
Its year of establishment was 1907.

Stanley was formerly in the Santa Fe School District, which operated a school in Stanley, which in 1962 had 150 students. In 1962 that district's school board approved a plan to have the district moved to Moriarty Municipal Schools.

In the period 1999-2013 the number of students in the district declined to 60% of its previous total, with declines increasing in size post-2008. In 2013 three members of the board of education had voted to close two schools, while one member voted against. In 2014 the New Mexico Public Education Department declined the Moriarty-Edgewood plan to close the schools, so the district sued the state agency.

== Service area ==
Much of the district is in Torrance County. Within Torrance County it includes Moriarty, Indian Hills, and all of that county's portion of Manzano Springs as well as a section of McIntosh.

Much of the district is in Santa Fe County. Within Santa Fe County it includes Cedar Grove, Golden, San Pedro, Stanley, Thunder Mountain, and that county's portions of Barton and Edgewood.

A portion of the district is in Bernalillo County. There it serves all portions of Barton and Manzano Springs in that county as well as much of Sedillo.

== Operations ==
The current headquarters is at 2422 E. New Mexico State Highway 333, and is the former Mountainview Elementary School. The same building houses the MESD Early Childhood Center.

Previously the administration building was at 200 Center Street in Moriarty. Moriarty Middle School and Moriarty High School are currently at that location.

== Schools ==
=== High schools ===
- Moriarty High School (Moriarty)

=== Middle schools ===
- Edgewood Middle School (Edgewood)
- Moriarty Middle School (Moriarty)

=== Elementary schools ===
- Moriarty Elementary School (Moriarty)
- Route 66 Elementary School (Unincorporated area)
- South Mountain Elementary School (Unincorporated area)

=== Preschool ===
- MESD Early Childhood Center (Unincorporated area)

== Former schools ==
Elementary schools

- Edgewood Elementary School (Edgewood) - Scheduled to close in 2014
- Mountainview Elementary School (Unincorporated area) - Scheduled to close in 2014
