= Mangas Springs =

Populated place in New Mexico, US

Coordinates: 32°50′33″N 108°30′42″W

Mangas Springs is a populated place in Grant County, New Mexico, United States, named for the springs found at that location. It lies at an elevation of 4,734 feet / 1,443 meters on Mangus Creek, a tributary of the Gila River.

== History ==
The Mangas Springs were originally named the Santa Lucia Springs, and was a favored haunt of the Ne-be-ke-yen-de local group of the Chííhénee’ band of the Chiricahua who once lived in the area and of Mangas Coloradas, for whom the springs are now named.
