= Stanley, New Mexico =

Unincorporated community in New Mexico, United States

- Unincorporated community
- Location within New Mexico Location within the United States
- Coordinates: 35°09′08″N 105°59′37″W
- Country: United States
- State: New Mexico
- County: Santa Fe

Area
  - Total: 6.17 sq mi (15.99 km^{2})
  - Land: 6.17 sq mi (15.99 km^{2})
  - Water: 0 sq mi (0.00 km^{2})
- Elevation: 6,345 ft (1,934 m)

Population (2020)
  - Total: 108
  - Density: 17.5/sq mi (6.75/km^{2})
- Time zone: UTC-7 (Mountain (MST))
  - Summer (DST): UTC-6 (CDT)
- ZIP code: 87056
- Area code: 505
- FIPS code: 35-75010
- GNIS ID: 2806768

Stanley is an unincorporated community in Santa Fe County, New Mexico, United States. As of the 2020 census, Stanley had a population of 108. The ZIP code is 87056.

== Geography ==
=== Climate ===
Climate type occurs primarily on the periphery of the true deserts in low-latitude semiarid steppe regions. The Köppen Climate Classification sub-type for this climate is BSk (Tropical and Subtropical Steppe Climate).

Climate data for Stanley, New Mexico
Month	Jan	Feb	Mar	Apr	May	Jun	Jul	Aug	Sep	Oct	Nov	Dec	Year
Mean daily maximum °F (°C)	43 (6)	49 (9)	56 (13)	65 (18)	75 (24)	84 (29)	87 (31)	84 (29)	78 (26)	68 (20)	54 (12)	45 (7)	66 (19)
Mean daily minimum °F (°C)	16 (−9)	20 (−7)	24 (−4)	31 (−1)	40 (4)	48 (9)	54 (12)	52 (11)	45 (7)	34 (1)	23 (−5)	16 (−9)	34 (1)
Average precipitation inches (mm)	0.4 (10)	0.4 (10)	0.5 (13)	0.5 (13)	1 (25)	1.2 (30)	2.2 (56)	2.2 (56)	1.5 (38)	1.2 (30)	0.5 (13)	0.5 (13)	12.1 (310)
Source: Weatherbase

== Demographics ==
Historical population
Census	Pop.	Note	%±
2020	108		—
U.S. Decennial Census

== Education ==
Stanley is in the Moriarty Municipal Schools district.

It was formerly in the Santa Fe School District, which operated a school in Stanley, which in 1962 had 150 students. In 1962 that district's school board approved a plan to have the district moved to Moriarty Municipal Schools. The superintendent of the Santa Fe district advocated for closing the Stanley School because of the following reasons: was in close proximity to the one of Moriarty, that it would not be viable as an elementary only school if only the high school were closed, the poor physical state of the building and it was not meeting the academic benchmarks set by the state government of New Mexico.

== Notable people ==
- Alan Ebnother, artist
- Jeffrey Epstein, financier, convicted sex offender, owned a rural compound located approximately eight miles north of Stanley
- Alice King, former First Lady of New Mexico
- Bruce King, 23rd, 25th and 28th Governor of New Mexico
- David King, 25th Treasurer of New Mexico
- Gary King, 30th Attorney General of New Mexico and son of Bruce King

== Popular culture ==
On January 18, 1975, Stanley was referenced in Hee Haw.

== See also ==
- Zorro Ranch
