= Conejo, New Mexico =

- Census-designated place
- Location within New Mexico Location within the United States
- Coordinates: 35°37′32″N 105°56′02″W
- Country: United States
- State: New Mexico
- County: Santa Fe

Area
  - Total: 1.90 sq mi (4.93 km^{2})
  - Land: 1.90 sq mi (4.93 km^{2})
  - Water: 0 sq mi (0.00 km^{2})
- Elevation: 7,015 ft (2,138 m)

Population (2020)
  - Total: 440
  - Density: 231.1/sq mi (89.21/km^{2})
- Time zone: UTC-7 (Mountain (MST))
  - Summer (DST): UTC-6 (MDT)
- ZIP Code: 87508 (Santa Fe)
- Area code: 505
- FIPS code: 35-17295
- GNIS feature ID: 2806758

Conejo is an unincorporated community and census-designated place (CDP) in Santa Fe County, New Mexico, United States. It was first listed as a CDP prior to the 2020 census. As of the 2020 census, Conejo had a population of 440.

== Geography ==
The CDP is north of the geographic center of the county and is bordered to the north by the city of Santa Fe, the state capital, to the east by Santa Fe Foothills, to the southeast by Sunlit Hills, and to the south by Arroyo Hondo.

Interstate 25 forms the northern and eastern borders of the CDP, with access from Exit 282 (U.S. Routes 84 and 285 / South Saint Francis Drive) and Exit 284 (New Mexico State Road 466 / Old Pecos Trail).

== Demographics ==
Historical population
Census	Pop.	Note	%±
2020	440		—
U.S. Decennial Census

== Education ==
It is within Santa Fe Public Schools.
