= Buckhorn, New Mexico =

- Census-designated place
- Location within New Mexico Location within the United States
- Coordinates: 33°01′53″N 108°41′40″W
- Country: United States
- State: New Mexico
- County: Grant

Area
  - Total: 4.64 sq mi (12.01 km^{2})
  - Land: 4.64 sq mi (12.01 km^{2})
  - Water: 0 sq mi (0.00 km^{2})
- Elevation: 4,731 ft (1,442 m)

Population (2020)
  - Total: 172
  - Density: 37.1/sq mi (14.33/km^{2})
- Time zone: UTC-7 (Mountain (MST))
  - Summer (DST): UTC-6 (MDT)
- ZIP code: 88025
- Area code: 575
- GNIS feature ID: 2584061

Buckhorn is a census-designated place in Grant County, New Mexico, United States. As of the 2020 census, Buckhorn had a population of 172. Buckhorn has a post office with ZIP code 88025. U.S. Route 180 passes through the community. The post office was established in 1913. Buckhorn was named for the nearby Buckhorn Creek.

== Demographics ==
Historical population
Census	Pop.	Note	%±
2020	172		—
U.S. Decennial Census
