= Casas Adobes, New Mexico =

- Census-designated place
- Location within New Mexico Location within the United States
- Coordinates: 32°48′34″N 107°56′21″W
- Country: United States
- State: New Mexico
- County: Grant

Area
  - Total: 0.93 sq mi (2.40 km^{2})
  - Land: 0.93 sq mi (2.40 km^{2})
  - Water: 0 sq mi (0.00 km^{2})
- Elevation: 5,820 ft (1,770 m)

Population (2020)
  - Total: 279
  - Density: 300.9/sq mi (116.17/km^{2})
- Time zone: UTC-7 (Mountain (MST))
  - Summer (DST): UTC-6 (MDT)
- ZIP Code: 88041 (Hanover)
- Area code: 575
- FIPS code: 35-12833
- GNIS feature ID: 2806702

Casas Adobes is an unincorporated community and census-designated place (CDP) in Grant County, New Mexico, United States. It was first listed as a CDP prior to the 2020 census. As of the 2020 census, Casas Adobes had a population of 279. Previously it was included within the San Lorenzo CDP.

The community is in eastern Grant County, in the valley of the Mimbres River. It is bordered to the northeast by San Lorenzo and to the north by Mimbres, both unincorporated. New Mexico State Road 152 passes just south of the community, leading west 14 miles (23 km) to Santa Clara and east over the Black Range 34 miles (55 km) to Hillsboro.

== Demographics ==
Historical population
Census	Pop.	Note	%±
2020	279		—
U.S. Decennial Census
