= Gila Hot Springs, New Mexico =

- Census-designated place
- Location within New Mexico Location within the United States
- Coordinates: 33°11′25″N 108°12′16″W
- Country: United States
- State: New Mexico
- County: Grant

Area
  - Total: 1.65 sq mi (4.27 km^{2})
  - Land: 1.65 sq mi (4.27 km^{2})
  - Water: 0 sq mi (0.00 km^{2})
- Elevation: 5,617 ft (1,712 m)

Population (2020)
  - Total: 35
  - Density: 21.2/sq mi (8.19/km^{2})
- Time zone: UTC-7 (Mountain (MST))
  - Summer (DST): UTC-6 (MDT)
- ZIP Code: 88061 (Silver City)
- Area code: 575
- FIPS code: 35-29230
- GNIS feature ID: 2806703

Gila Hot Springs is an unincorporated community and census-designated place (CDP) in Grant County, New Mexico, United States. It was first listed as a CDP prior to the 2020 census. As of the 2020 census, Gila Hot Springs had a population of 35.

The community is on the northern edge of Grant County, in the valley of the West Fork of the Gila River. It is bordered to the north by Catron County. New Mexico State Road 15 passes through the community, leading northwest 5 miles (8 km) to its terminus at Gila Cliff Dwellings National Monument and south 40 miles (64 km) to Silver City, the Grant county seat.

== Demographics ==
Historical population
Census	Pop.	Note	%±
2020	35		—
U.S. Decennial Census

== Climate ==
According to the Köppen Climate Classification system, Gila Hot Springs has a cold semi-arid climate, abbreviated "BSk" on climate maps. The hottest temperature recorded in Gila Hot Springs was 104 °F (40.0 °C) on June 24–25, 1990 and June 14, 2021, while the coldest temperature recorded was −15 °F (−26.1 °C) on January 5, 1971.

Climate data for Gila Hot Springs, New Mexico, 1991–2020 normals, extremes 1957–present
Month	Jan	Feb	Mar	Apr	May	Jun	Jul	Aug	Sep	Oct	Nov	Dec	Year
Record high °F (°C)	78 (26)	80 (27)	85 (29)	91 (33)	97 (36)	104 (40)	103 (39)	102 (39)	98 (37)	92 (33)	81 (27)	75 (24)	104 (40)
Mean maximum °F (°C)	67.2 (19.6)	70.6 (21.4)	76.7 (24.8)	82.8 (28.2)	90.0 (32.2)	97.4 (36.3)	96.8 (36.0)	92.6 (33.7)	90.1 (32.3)	84.5 (29.2)	75.1 (23.9)	67.3 (19.6)	98.9 (37.2)
Mean daily maximum °F (°C)	56.6 (13.7)	60.0 (15.6)	66.5 (19.2)	73.4 (23.0)	80.8 (27.1)	89.6 (32.0)	89.3 (31.8)	87.1 (30.6)	83.2 (28.4)	75.4 (24.1)	64.8 (18.2)	55.9 (13.3)	73.6 (23.1)
Daily mean °F (°C)	37.0 (2.8)	40.8 (4.9)	46.0 (7.8)	51.7 (10.9)	58.4 (14.7)	66.8 (19.3)	71.2 (21.8)	70.2 (21.2)	64.3 (17.9)	54.2 (12.3)	44.3 (6.8)	37.1 (2.8)	53.5 (11.9)
Mean daily minimum °F (°C)	17.4 (−8.1)	21.6 (−5.8)	25.5 (−3.6)	29.9 (−1.2)	35.9 (2.2)	44.0 (6.7)	53.2 (11.8)	53.3 (11.8)	45.3 (7.4)	33.1 (0.6)	23.7 (−4.6)	18.2 (−7.7)	33.4 (0.8)
Mean minimum °F (°C)	6.4 (−14.2)	10.6 (−11.9)	15.5 (−9.2)	20.1 (−6.6)	27.0 (−2.8)	34.6 (1.4)	45.4 (7.4)	45.3 (7.4)	34.4 (1.3)	22.3 (−5.4)	11.3 (−11.5)	5.9 (−14.5)	3.5 (−15.8)
Record low °F (°C)	−15 (−26)	−11 (−24)	2 (−17)	12 (−11)	19 (−7)	27 (−3)	35 (2)	37 (3)	28 (−2)	5 (−15)	2 (−17)	−13 (−25)	−15 (−26)
Average precipitation inches (mm)	1.01 (26)	0.95 (24)	0.69 (18)	0.41 (10)	0.52 (13)	0.66 (17)	2.67 (68)	3.07 (78)	1.81 (46)	1.18 (30)	1.03 (26)	1.17 (30)	15.17 (386)
Average snowfall inches (cm)	3.0 (7.6)	0.6 (1.5)	0.3 (0.76)	0.1 (0.25)	0.0 (0.0)	0.0 (0.0)	0.0 (0.0)	0.0 (0.0)	0.0 (0.0)	0.2 (0.51)	0.3 (0.76)	1.3 (3.3)	5.8 (14.68)
Average precipitation days (≥ 0.01 in)	5.0	5.1	4.0	2.1	3.0	3.5	13.4	14.1	6.9	4.9	3.6	5.3	70.9
Average snowy days (≥ 0.1 in)	1.1	0.5	0.2	0.1	0.0	0.0	0.0	0.0	0.0	0.1	0.1	0.9	3.0
Source 1: NOAA
Source 2: National Weather Service
