= Rosedale, New Mexico =

- Census-designated place
- Location within New Mexico Location within the United States
- Coordinates: 32°46′10″N 108°14′30″W
- Country: United States
- State: New Mexico
- County: Grant

Area
  - Total: 1.77 sq mi (4.58 km^{2})
  - Land: 1.77 sq mi (4.58 km^{2})
  - Water: 0 sq mi (0.00 km^{2})
- Elevation: 5,968 ft (1,819 m)

Population (2020)
  - Total: 377
  - Density: 213/sq mi (82.4/km^{2})
- Time zone: UTC-7 (Mountain (MST))
  - Summer (DST): UTC-6 (MDT)
- Area code: 575
- GNIS feature ID: 2584196

Rosedale is a census-designated place in Grant County, New Mexico, United States. As of the 2020 census, Rosedale had a population of 377. Rosedale was established in 1882 by prospector Jack Richardson and his wife Rose.

== Geography ==
Rosedale is located east of Silver City. According to the U.S. Census Bureau, the community has an area of 1.767 square miles (4.58 km^{2}), all land.

== Demographics ==
Historical population
| Census | Pop. | Note | %± |
|---|---|---|---|
| 2020 | 377 | | — |
U.S. Decennial Census
