= Stoneridge, New Mexico =

- Census-designated place
- Location within New Mexico Location within the United States
- Coordinates: 35°18′07″N 108°06′12″W
- Country: United States
- State: New Mexico
- County: Cibola

Area
  - Total: 0.80 sq mi (2.07 km^{2})
  - Land: 0.80 sq mi (2.07 km^{2})
  - Water: 0 sq mi (0.00 km^{2})
- Elevation: 7,422 ft (2,262 m)

Population (2020)
  - Total: 21
  - Density: 26.3/sq mi (10.15/km^{2})
- Time zone: UTC-7 (Mountain (MST))
  - Summer (DST): UTC-6 (MDT)
- ZIP Code: 87045 (Prewitt)
- Area code: 505
- FIPS code: 35-75465
- GNIS feature ID: 2806696

Stoneridge is a census-designated place (CDP) in Cibola County, New Mexico, United States. It was first listed as a CDP prior to the 2020 census. As of the 2020 census, Stoneridge had a population of 21.

Stoneridge is on the northern edge of Cibola County, on the north side of Bluewater Lake and its outlet stream, Bluewater Creek. The western half of the CDP is in Bluewater Lake State Park. The CDP is bordered to the north by the community of Homer C Jones in McKinley County. Prewitt is 7 miles (11 km) to the northeast.

== Demographics ==
Historical population
| Census | Pop. | Note | %± |
|---|---|---|---|
| 2020 | 21 | | — |
U.S. Decennial Census
