= Little Walnut Village, New Mexico =

- Census-designated place
- Location within New Mexico Location within the United States
- Coordinates: 32°49′33″N 108°16′52″W
- Country: United States
- State: New Mexico
- County: Grant

Area
  - Total: 5.87 sq mi (15.20 km^{2})
  - Land: 5.86 sq mi (15.18 km^{2})
  - Water: 0.012 sq mi (0.03 km^{2})
- Elevation: 6,237 ft (1,901 m)

Population (2020)
  - Total: 1,386
  - Density: 236.5/sq mi (91.31/km^{2})
- Time zone: UTC-7 (Mountain (MST))
  - Summer (DST): UTC-6 (MDT)
- ZIP Code: 88061 (Silver City)
- Area code: 575
- FIPS code: 35-41340
- GNIS feature ID: 2806704

Little Walnut Village is an unincorporated community and census-designated place (CDP) in Grant County, New Mexico, United States. It was first listed as a CDP prior to the 2020 census. As of the 2020 census, Little Walnut Village had a population of 1,386.

The community is east of the center of Grant County and is bordered to the south by Silver City, the county seat. It is in the valley of Little Walnut Creek, which flows south from the Continental Divide, 2 miles (3 km) north of the community. The CDP is bordered to the north and west by Gila National Forest.

== Demographics ==
Historical population
Census	Pop.	Note	%±
2020	1,386		—
U.S. Decennial Census
