= Arenas Valley, New Mexico =

- Census-designated place
- Location within New Mexico Location within the United States
- Coordinates: 32°46′35″N 108°12′11″W
- Country: United States
- State: New Mexico
- County: Grant

Area
  - Total: 4.07 sq mi (10.53 km^{2})
  - Land: 4.07 sq mi (10.53 km^{2})
  - Water: 0 sq mi (0.00 km^{2})
- Elevation: 6,053 ft (1,845 m)

Population (2020)
  - Total: 1,291
  - Density: 317.5/sq mi (122.57/km^{2})
- Time zone: UTC-7 (Mountain (MST))
  - Summer (DST): UTC-6 (MDT)
- ZIP code: 88022
- Area code: 575
- GNIS feature ID: 2584051

Arenas Valley is a census-designated place in Grant County, New Mexico, United States. As of the 2020 census, Arenas Valley had a population of 1,291. Arenas Valley had a post office from January 1, 1946, to March 7, 1987; it still has its own ZIP code, 88022. It was named because it was near the Rio de Arenas, a normally dry arroyo or gully, but residents have long referred to it as "Whiskey Creek," based on the local legend that a heavy rain in the nearby Piños Altos Mountains flooded an illegal still and whiskey barrels floated down another arroyo, designated "Whiskey Creek" on maps that show drainages from the Pinos Altos Range arroyo, and passed through the "built-up" area.

== Demographics ==
Historical population
Census	Pop.	Note	%±
2020	1,291		—
U.S. Decennial Census
