= White Signal, New Mexico =

- Census-designated place
- Location within New Mexico Location within the United States
- Coordinates: 32°34′05″N 108°21′45″W
- Country: United States
- State: New Mexico
- County: Grant

Area
  - Total: 6.44 sq mi (16.68 km^{2})
  - Land: 6.43 sq mi (16.66 km^{2})
  - Water: 0.0077 sq mi (0.02 km^{2})
- Elevation: 6,030 ft (1,840 m)

Population (2020)
  - Total: 191
  - Density: 29.7/sq mi (11.46/km^{2})
- Time zone: UTC-7 (Mountain (MST))
  - Summer (DST): UTC-6 (MDT)
- Area code: 575
- GNIS feature ID: 2584238

White Signal is a census-designated place in Grant County, New Mexico, United States. As of the 2020 census, White Signal had a population of 191. New Mexico State Road 90 passes through the community.

White Signal was named for a nearby outcropping of reflective white quartz; early residents thought the reflected sunlight resembled a signal. The community had a post office from 1909 to 1933.

== Geography ==
According to the U.S. Census Bureau, the community has an area of 6.442 square miles (16.68 km^{2}); 6.433 square miles (16.66 km^{2}) of its area is land and 0.009 square miles (0.023 km^{2}) is water.

== Climate ==
According to the Köppen Climate Classification system, White Signal has a cold semi-arid climate, abbreviated "BSk" on climate maps. The hottest temperature recorded in White Signal was 104 °F (40.0 °C) on June 20, 1960, while the coldest temperature recorded was −18 °F (−27.8 °C) on January 11, 1962.

Climate data for White Signal, New Mexico, 1991–2020 normals, extremes 1960–present
Month	Jan	Feb	Mar	Apr	May	Jun	Jul	Aug	Sep	Oct	Nov	Dec	Year
Record high °F (°C)	74 (23)	82 (28)	81 (27)	88 (31)	96 (36)	104 (40)	102 (39)	100 (38)	98 (37)	93 (34)	79 (26)	72 (22)	104 (40)
Mean maximum °F (°C)	62.3 (16.8)	65.7 (18.7)	73.3 (22.9)	79.3 (26.3)	87.2 (30.7)	95.1 (35.1)	94.9 (34.9)	91.0 (32.8)	87.1 (30.6)	81.7 (27.6)	71.3 (21.8)	63.6 (17.6)	96.9 (36.1)
Mean daily maximum °F (°C)	52.8 (11.6)	56.4 (13.6)	63.4 (17.4)	71.3 (21.8)	79.6 (26.4)	88.6 (31.4)	87.9 (31.1)	85.5 (29.7)	80.6 (27.0)	72.2 (22.3)	60.7 (15.9)	52.0 (11.1)	70.9 (21.6)
Daily mean °F (°C)	39.6 (4.2)	42.8 (6.0)	48.1 (8.9)	55.2 (12.9)	63.7 (17.6)	73.3 (22.9)	74.8 (23.8)	72.8 (22.7)	67.1 (19.5)	57.4 (14.1)	46.5 (8.1)	39.1 (3.9)	56.7 (13.7)
Mean daily minimum °F (°C)	26.5 (−3.1)	29.2 (−1.6)	32.9 (0.5)	39.2 (4.0)	47.9 (8.8)	58.1 (14.5)	61.8 (16.6)	60.0 (15.6)	53.5 (11.9)	42.7 (5.9)	32.3 (0.2)	26.2 (−3.2)	42.5 (5.8)
Mean minimum °F (°C)	12.3 (−10.9)	15.0 (−9.4)	19.0 (−7.2)	24.2 (−4.3)	33.2 (0.7)	43.3 (6.3)	50.7 (10.4)	50.2 (10.1)	41.4 (5.2)	26.8 (−2.9)	16.9 (−8.4)	10.4 (−12.0)	7.8 (−13.4)
Record low °F (°C)	−18 (−28)	1 (−17)	5 (−15)	17 (−8)	21 (−6)	27 (−3)	38 (3)	37 (3)	32 (0)	10 (−12)	5 (−15)	−10 (−23)	−18 (−28)
Average precipitation inches (mm)	1.10 (28)	1.06 (27)	0.59 (15)	0.30 (7.6)	0.38 (9.7)	0.58 (15)	3.30 (84)	2.74 (70)	1.60 (41)	1.06 (27)	1.00 (25)	1.50 (38)	15.21 (387.3)
Average snowfall inches (cm)	4.2 (11)	1.9 (4.8)	1.0 (2.5)	0.2 (0.51)	0.0 (0.0)	0.0 (0.0)	0.0 (0.0)	0.0 (0.0)	0.0 (0.0)	0.1 (0.25)	1.1 (2.8)	4.6 (12)	13.1 (33.86)
Average precipitation days (≥ 0.01 in)	4.8	5.2	3.3	1.7	2.3	3.0	10.1	10.0	5.7	4.2	3.3	5.0	58.6
Average snowy days (≥ 0.1 in)	1.9	1.3	0.9	0.2	0.0	0.0	0.0	0.0	0.0	0.1	0.5	1.8	6.7
Source 1: NOAA
Source 2: National Weather Service

== Demographics ==
Historical population
Census	Pop.	Note	%±
2020	191		—
U.S. Decennial Census
