= North San Ysidro, New Mexico =

- Unincorporated community
- Location within New Mexico
- Coordinates: 35°28′29″N 105°33′58″W
- Country: United States
- State: New Mexico
- County: San Miguel

Area
  - Total: 2.30 sq mi (5.95 km^{2})
  - Land: 2.30 sq mi (5.95 km^{2})
  - Water: 0 sq mi (0.00 km^{2})
- Elevation: 6,844 ft (2,086 m)

Population (2020)
  - Total: 125
  - Density: 54/sq mi (21/km^{2})
- Time zone: UTC-7 (Mountain (MST))
  - Summer (DST): UTC-6 (MDT)
- Area code: 505
- GNIS feature ID: 2584167

North San Ysidro is an unincorporated community and census-designated place in San Miguel County, New Mexico, United States. As of the 2020 census, North San Ysidro had a population of 125.

== Geography ==
According to the U.S. Census Bureau, the community has an area of 2.298 square miles (5.95 km^{2}), all land.

== Demographics ==
Historical population
Census	Pop.	Note	%±
2020	125		—
U.S. Decennial Census

== Education ==
It is within Pecos Independent Schools.
