= Conchas Dam, New Mexico =

- Census-designated place
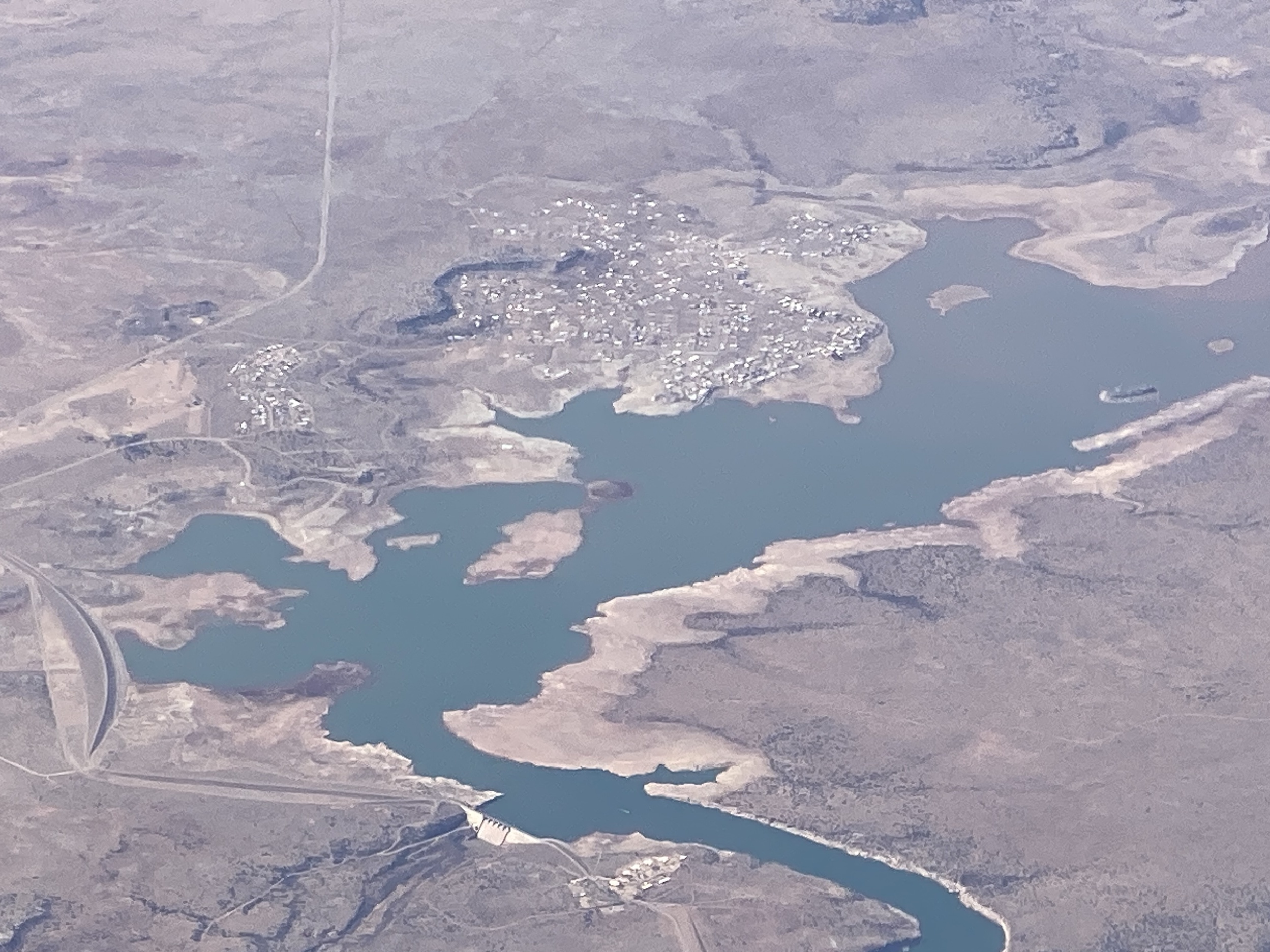
- Aerial view of Conchas Dam

- Location within New Mexico
- Coordinates: 35°22′10″N 104°12′12″W
- Country: United States
- State: New Mexico
- County: San Miguel

Area
  - Total: 10.10 sq mi (26.15 km^{2})
  - Land: 8.32 sq mi (21.56 km^{2})
  - Water: 1.77 sq mi (4.59 km^{2})
- Elevation: 4,229 ft (1,289 m)

Population (2020)
  - Total: 194
  - Density: 23/sq mi (9/km^{2})
- Time zone: UTC-7 (Mountain (MST))
  - Summer (DST): UTC-6 (MDT)
- ZIP code: 88416
- Area code: 575
- GNIS feature ID: 2629107

Conchas Dam is a census-designated place in San Miguel County, New Mexico, United States. As of the 2020 census, Conchas Dam had a population of 194.

It includes the Conchas Dam Historic District, which is listed on the National Register of Historic Places. It is on the Canadian River.

== Geography ==
=== Climate ===
Climate data for Conchas Dam, New Mexico (1991–2020 normals, extremes 1936–present)
Month	Jan	Feb	Mar	Apr	May	Jun	Jul	Aug	Sep	Oct	Nov	Dec	Year
Record high °F (°C)	82 (28)	84 (29)	91 (33)	97 (36)	106 (41)	114 (46)	109 (43)	107 (42)	104 (40)	97 (36)	87 (31)	78 (26)	114 (46)
Mean daily maximum °F (°C)	52.7 (11.5)	57.2 (14.0)	65.2 (18.4)	72.3 (22.4)	81.3 (27.4)	91.6 (33.1)	94.2 (34.6)	91.8 (33.2)	84.9 (29.4)	74.1 (23.4)	62.2 (16.8)	52.4 (11.3)	73.3 (23.0)
Daily mean °F (°C)	39.1 (3.9)	43.2 (6.2)	50.6 (10.3)	58.4 (14.7)	67.8 (19.9)	77.8 (25.4)	81.1 (27.3)	79.0 (26.1)	72.0 (22.2)	60.2 (15.7)	48.5 (9.2)	39.5 (4.2)	59.8 (15.4)
Mean daily minimum °F (°C)	25.5 (−3.6)	29.1 (−1.6)	36.1 (2.3)	44.5 (6.9)	54.3 (12.4)	63.9 (17.7)	68.1 (20.1)	66.2 (19.0)	59.1 (15.1)	46.3 (7.9)	34.7 (1.5)	26.6 (−3.0)	46.2 (7.9)
Record low °F (°C)	−20 (−29)	−12 (−24)	1 (−17)	16 (−9)	30 (−1)	41 (5)	51 (11)	46 (8)	35 (2)	16 (−9)	2 (−17)	−10 (−23)	−20 (−29)
Average precipitation inches (mm)	0.38 (9.7)	0.28 (7.1)	0.67 (17)	0.94 (24)	1.44 (37)	1.90 (48)	2.67 (68)	2.37 (60)	2.11 (54)	1.31 (33)	0.56 (14)	0.59 (15)	15.22 (386.8)
Average snowfall inches (cm)	2.2 (5.6)	1.1 (2.8)	1.0 (2.5)	0.2 (0.51)	0.0 (0.0)	0.0 (0.0)	0.0 (0.0)	0.0 (0.0)	0.0 (0.0)	0.7 (1.8)	0.9 (2.3)	2.3 (5.8)	8.4 (21.31)
Average precipitation days (≥ 0.01 in)	2.4	2.7	3.0	3.6	5.2	6.0	8.4	8.9	5.5	4.3	2.7	3.1	55.8
Average snowy days (≥ 0.1 in)	1.1	0.7	0.3	0.1	0.0	0.0	0.0	0.0	0.0	0.1	0.5	1.1	3.9
Source 1: NOAA
Source 2: xmACIS2

== Demographics ==
Historical population
Census	Pop.	Note	%±
2020	194		—
U.S. Decennial Census
