= Grant County, New Mexico =

County in New Mexico, United States

- County
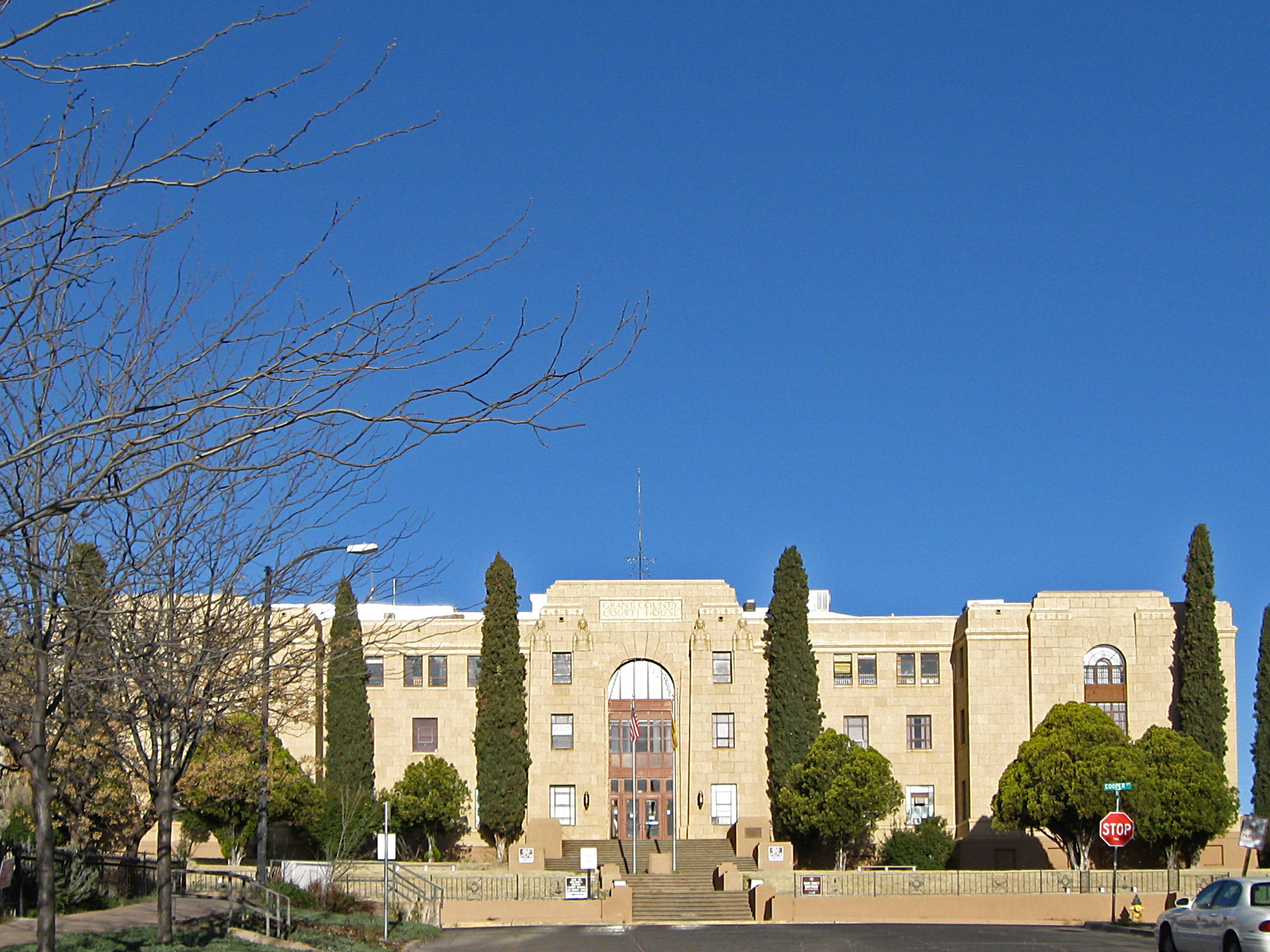
- Grant County Courthouse in Silver City

- Location within the U.S. state of New Mexico
- Coordinates: 32°44′N 108°23′W
- Country: United States
- State: New Mexico
- Founded: 1868
- Named for: Ulysses S. Grant
- Seat: Silver City
- Largest town: Silver City

Area
  - Total: 3,968 sq mi (10,280 km^{2})
  - Land: 3,962 sq mi (10,260 km^{2})
  - Water: 5.9 sq mi (15 km^{2}) 0.1%

Population (2020)
  - Total: 28,185
  - Estimate (2025): 27,252 ▼
  - Density: 7.114/sq mi (2.747/km^{2})
- Time zone: UTC−7 (Mountain)
  - Summer (DST): UTC−6 (MDT)
- Congressional district: 2nd
- Website: www.grantcountynm.gov

Grant County is a county located in the U.S. state of New Mexico. At the 2020 census, the population was 28,185. Its county seat is Silver City. The county was founded in 1868 and named for Ulysses S. Grant, the 18th President of the United States. Grant County comprises the Silver City, NM, Micropolitan Statistical Area. It is part of the Southwest New Mexico Council of Governments.

== Geography ==
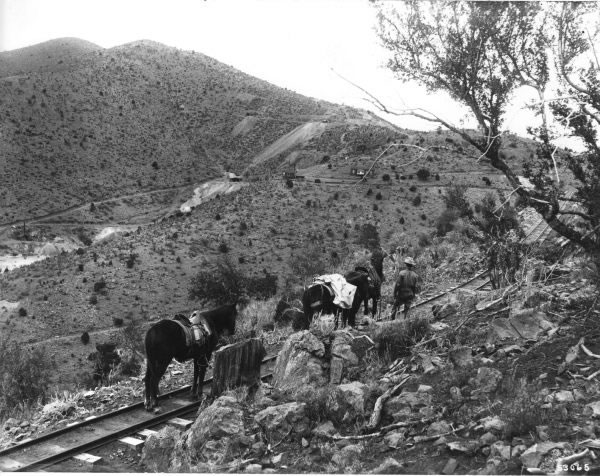
Narrow-gauge railroad to the mines at Pinos Altos

According to the U.S. Census Bureau, the county has a total area of 3,968 square miles (10,280 km^{2}), of which 3,962 square miles (10,260 km^{2}) is land and 5.9 square miles (15 km^{2}) (0.1%) is water.

=== Adjacent counties ===
- Catron County - north
- Sierra County - east
- Luna County - southeast
- Hidalgo County - south
- Greenlee County, Arizona - west

=== National protected area ===
- Gila National Forest (part)

== Demographics ==
Historical population
Census	Pop.	Note	%±
1870	1,143		—
1880	4,539		297.1%
1890	9,657		112.8%
1900	12,883		33.4%
1910	14,813		15.0%
1920	21,939		48.1%
1930	19,050		−13.2%
1940	20,050		5.2%
1950	21,649		8.0%
1960	18,700		−13.6%
1970	22,030		17.8%
1980	26,204		18.9%
1990	27,676		5.6%
2000	31,002		12.0%
2010	29,514		−4.8%
2020	28,185		−4.5%
2025 (est.)	27,252	▼	−3.3%
U.S. Decennial Census; 1790-1960 1900-1990; 1990-2000 2010-2016

=== 2020 census ===
As of the 2020 census, there were 28,185 people and 12,269 households in the county. The population density was 7.1 per square mile (2.7/km^{2}). There were 14,584 housing units at an average density of 3.7 per square mile (1.4/km^{2}), of which 15.9% were vacant.

The median age was 49.3 years. 19.0% of residents were under the age of 18 and 28.8% of residents were 65 years of age or older. For every 100 females there were 96.3 males, and for every 100 females age 18 and over there were 94.5 males.

Grant County, New Mexico – Racial and ethnic composition Note: the US Census treats Hispanic/Latino as an ethnic category. This table excludes Latinos from the racial categories and assigns them to a separate category. Hispanics/Latinos may be of any race.
Race / Ethnicity (NH = Non-Hispanic)	Pop 2000	Pop 2010	Pop 2020	% 2000	% 2010	% 2020
White alone (NH)	15,048	14,356	13,117	48.54%	48.64%	46.54%
Black or African American alone (NH)	113	185	249	0.36%	0.63%	0.88%
Native American or Alaska Native alone (NH)	229	215	265	0.74%	0.73%	0.94%
Asian alone (NH)	79	109	191	0.25%	0.37%	0.68%
Pacific Islander alone (NH)	9	22	18	0.03%	0.07%	0.06%
Other race alone (NH)	62	72	168	0.20%	0.24%	0.60%
Mixed race or Multiracial (NH)	336	303	711	1.08%	1.03%	2.52%
Hispanic or Latino (any race)	15,126	14,252	13,466	48.79%	48.29%	47.78%
Total	31,002	29,514	28,185	100.00%	100.00%	100.00%

The racial makeup of the county was 64.8% White, 1.1% Black or African American, 2.1% American Indian and Alaska Native, 0.7% Asian, 0.1% Native Hawaiian and Pacific Islander, 11.7% from some other race, and 19.5% from two or more races. Hispanic or Latino residents of any race comprised 47.8% of the population.

59.6% of residents lived in urban areas, while 40.4% lived in rural areas.

Of the 12,269 households, 22.9% had children under the age of 18 living with them and 29.5% had a female householder with no spouse or partner present. About 34.1% of all households were made up of individuals and 18.3% had someone living alone who was 65 years of age or older. Among occupied housing units, 72.3% were owner-occupied and 27.7% were renter-occupied; the homeowner vacancy rate was 2.5% and the rental vacancy rate was 10.3%.

=== 2010 census ===
At the 2010 census, there were 29,514 people, 12,586 households and 7,941 families living in the county. The population density was 7.4 per square mile (2.9/km^{2}). There were 14,693 housing units at an average density of 3.7 per square mile (1.4/km^{2}). The racial make-up was 84.9% white, 1.4% American Indian, 0.9% black or African American, 0.4% Asian, 0.1% Pacific islander, 9.6% from other races and 2.8% from two or more races. Those of Hispanic or Latino origin made up 48.3% of the population. In terms of ancestry, 11.9% were English, 11.8% were German, 10.4% were Irish, and 2.9% were American.

Of the 12,586 households, 26.9% had children under the age of 18 living with them, 45.3% were married couples living together, 12.6% had a female householder with no husband present, 36.9% were non-families, and 30.9% of all households were made up of individuals. The average household size was 2.30 and the average family size was 2.86. The median age was 45.9 years.

The median Household income was $36,591 and the median family income was $44,360. Males had a median income of $38,731 and females $27,161. The per capita income was $21,164. About 11.7% of families and 14.8% of the population were below the poverty line, including 23.8% of those under age 18 and 5.2% of those age 65 or over.

=== 2000 census ===
At the 2000 census, there were 31,002 people, 12,146 households and 8,514 families living in the county. The population density was 8 people per square mile (3.1 people/km^{2}). There were 14,066 housing units at an average density of 4 units per square mile (1.5/km^{2}). The racial make-up was 75.67% White, 0.52% Black or African American, 1.35% Native American, 0.29% Asian, 0.03% Pacific Islander, 19.02% from other races, and 3.11% from two or more races. 48.79% of the population were Hispanic or Latino of any race.

There were 12,146 households, of which 31.30% had children under the age of 18 living with them, 52.70% were married couples living together, 12.90% had a female householder with no husband present, and 29.90% were non-families. 25.70% of all households were made up of individuals, and 10.70% had someone living alone who was 65 years of age or older. The average household size was 2.50 and the average family size was 3.01.

26.20% of the population were under the age of 18, 8.50% from 18 to 24, 23.70% from 25 to 44, 25.10% from 45 to 64 and 16.50% were 65 years of age or older. The median age was 39 years. For every 100 females there were 95.10 males. For every 100 females age 18 and over, there were 91.30 males.

The median household income was $29,134 and the median family income was $34,231. Males had a median income of $31,126 and females $19,627. The per capita income was $14,597. About 15.10% of families and 18.70% of the population were below the poverty line, including 25.90% of those under age 18 and 9.50% of those age 65 or over.

== Communities ==
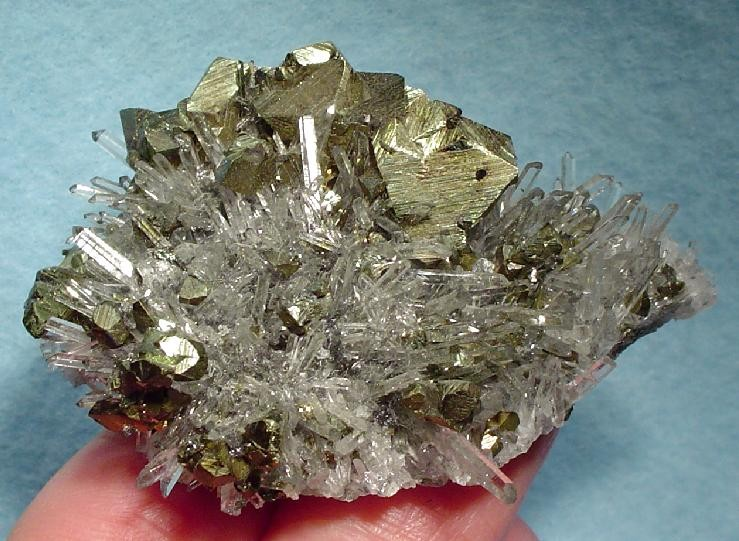
Showy specimen of chalcopyrite in quartz needles, from the old Groundhog Mine, between Bayard and the Chino mine.

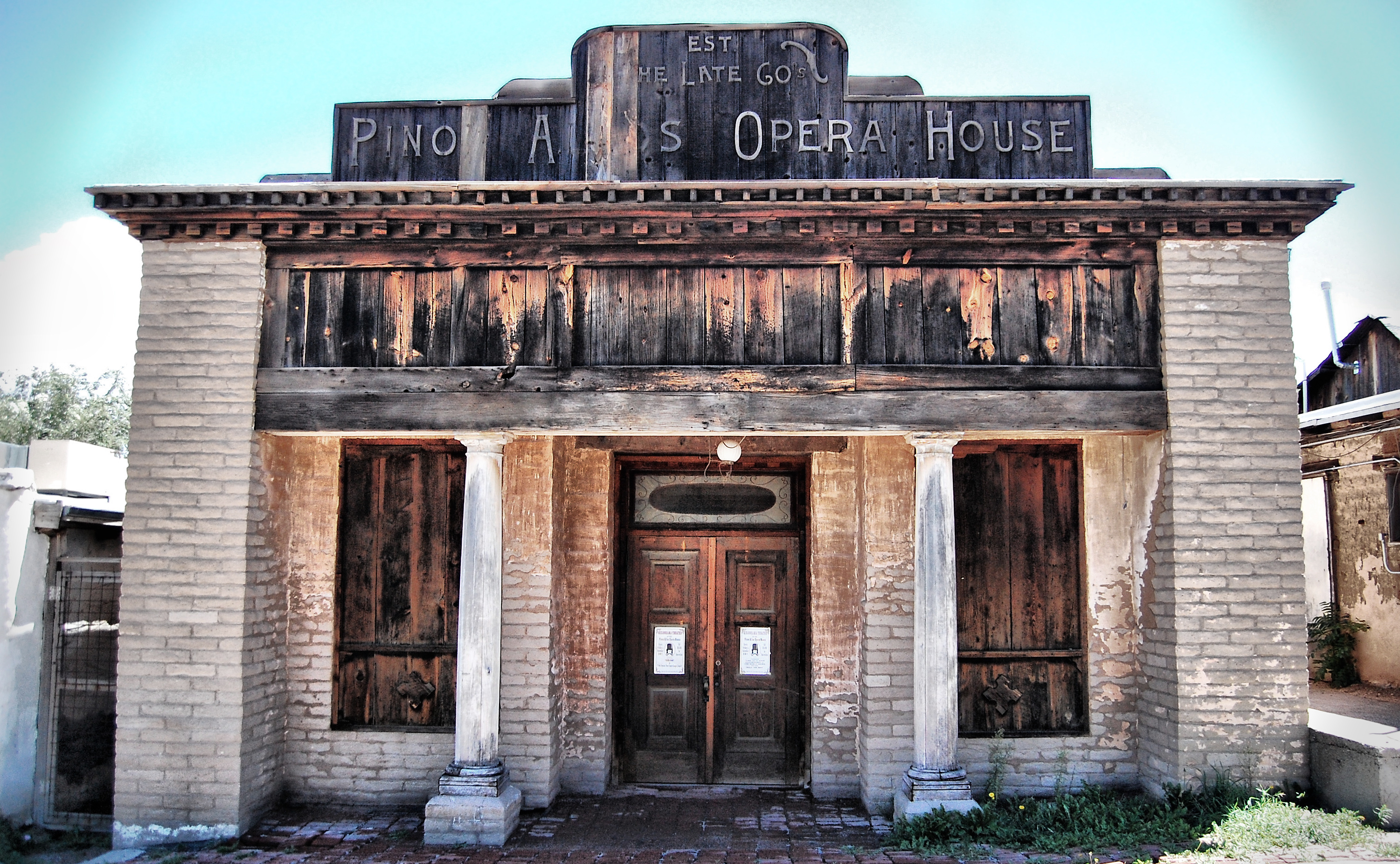
The old Pinos Altos Opera House

=== City ===
- Bayard

=== Towns ===
- Hurley
- Silver City (county seat)

=== Village ===
- Santa Clara

=== Census-designated places ===
- Arenas Valley
- Buckhorn
- Casas Adobes
- Cliff
- Cobre
- Faywood
- Gila
- Gila Hot Springs
- Hachita
- Hanover
- Lake Roberts
- Lake Roberts Heights
- Little Walnut Village
- Mimbres
- North Hurley
- Pinos Altos
- Redrock
- Rosedale
- San Lorenzo
- Trout Valley
- Tyrone
- White Signal

=== Unincorporated communities ===
- Dwyer
- Fort Bayard
- Mangas Springs
- Mule Creek
- Riverside
- Separ
- Sherman

== Politics ==
Grant County has leaned Democratic for most of its history, although since 1980 Republicans have typically held over 40% of the vote. Since 1932, it has only voted for the Republican presidential nominee twice, both times by narrow margins. The communities of Silver City, Bayard and Hurley and surrounding areas are strongly Democratic and hold the majority of the county's voters, while many rural areas of the county, especially in the south and west, are highly Republican.

United States presidential election results for Grant County, New Mexico
Year	Republican		Democratic		Third party(ies)	
Year	No.	%	No.	%	No.	%
1912	439	20.72%	1,130	53.33%	550	25.96%
1916	1,869	43.73%	2,305	53.93%	100	2.34%
1920	2,230	53.77%	1,879	45.31%	38	0.92%
1924	1,756	39.59%	2,085	47.00%	595	13.41%
1928	2,058	50.69%	1,994	49.11%	8	0.20%
1932	1,381	28.80%	3,344	69.74%	70	1.46%
1936	1,469	31.02%	3,215	67.88%	52	1.10%
1940	2,015	33.98%	3,914	66.00%	1	0.02%
1944	1,970	36.17%	3,472	63.75%	4	0.07%
1948	1,999	34.90%	3,592	62.72%	136	2.37%
1952	3,421	43.18%	4,315	54.47%	186	2.35%
1956	3,224	43.70%	4,122	55.88%	31	0.42%
1960	2,468	35.93%	4,378	63.74%	22	0.32%
1964	2,042	27.92%	5,253	71.82%	19	0.26%
1968	2,908	38.52%	3,817	50.56%	824	10.92%
1972	4,431	50.46%	4,081	46.48%	269	3.06%
1976	4,095	43.90%	5,176	55.49%	57	0.61%
1980	4,628	47.41%	4,600	47.13%	533	5.46%
1984	4,979	45.93%	5,755	53.09%	106	0.98%
1988	4,196	43.10%	5,443	55.91%	96	0.99%
1992	2,917	28.38%	5,603	54.52%	1,757	17.10%
1996	3,993	36.54%	5,860	53.62%	1,075	9.84%
2000	4,961	44.13%	5,673	50.47%	607	5.40%
2004	6,135	45.81%	7,095	52.98%	162	1.21%
2008	5,406	39.30%	8,142	59.19%	207	1.50%
2012	5,358	41.53%	7,090	54.95%	454	3.52%
2016	5,288	41.28%	6,276	48.99%	1,247	9.73%
2020	6,553	45.40%	7,590	52.58%	292	2.02%
2024	6,580	46.26%	7,301	51.33%	343	2.41%

== Transportation ==
=== Major highways ===
- I-10 / US 70
- US 180
- NM 9
- NM 15
- NM 35
- NM 61
- NM 78
- NM 81
- NM 91
- NM 113
- NM 146
- NM 152
- NM 153
- NM 211
- NM 293
- NM 356
- NM 464

== See also ==
- National Register of Historic Places listings in Grant County, New Mexico
