= Cobre, New Mexico =

- Census-designated place
- Location within New Mexico Location within the United States
- Coordinates: 32°46′50″N 108°06′38″W
- Country: United States
- State: New Mexico
- County: Grant

Area
  - Total: 0.066 sq mi (0.17 km^{2})
  - Land: 0.066 sq mi (0.17 km^{2})
  - Water: 0 sq mi (0.00 km^{2})
- Elevation: 6,008 ft (1,831 m)

Population (2020)
  - Total: 17
  - Density: 253.4/sq mi (97.83/km^{2})
- Time zone: UTC-7 (Mountain (MST))
  - Summer (DST): UTC-6 (MDT)
- Area code: 575
- GNIS feature ID: 2584079

Cobre is a census-designated place in Grant County, New Mexico, United States. The population was 17 at the 2020 census. New Mexico State Road 356 passes through the community.

== Geography ==
According to the U.S. Census Bureau, the community has an area of 0.067 square miles (0.17 km^{2}), all land.

== Demographics ==
Historical population
Census	Pop.	Note	%±
2010	39		—
2020	17		−56.4%
U.S. Decennial Census
