= Soham, New Mexico =

- Unincorporated community
- Location within New Mexico
- Coordinates: 35°25′00″N 105°30′22″W
- Country: United States
- State: New Mexico
- County: San Miguel

Area
  - Total: 1.55 sq mi (4.01 km^{2})
  - Land: 1.55 sq mi (4.01 km^{2})
  - Water: 0 sq mi (0.00 km^{2})
- Elevation: 6,132 ft (1,869 m)

Population (2020)
  - Total: 147
  - Density: 95.0/sq mi (36.69/km^{2})
- Time zone: UTC-7 (Mountain (MST))
  - Summer (DST): UTC-6 (MDT)
- Area code: 505
- GNIS feature ID: 2584219

Soham is an unincorporated community and census-designated place in San Miguel County, New Mexico, United States. As of the 2020 census, Soham had a population of 147. The community is located near Exit 319 on Interstate 25.

== Geography ==
According to the U.S. Census Bureau, the community has an area of 1.547 square miles (4.01 km^{2}), all land.

== Demographics ==
Historical population
Census	Pop.	Note	%±
2020	147		—
U.S. Decennial Census

== Education ==
It is within Pecos Independent Schools.
