= Inez, New Mexico =

Unincorporated community in New Mexico, US

Inez
- Unincorporated community
- Location of Inez in New Mexico
- Coordinates: 33°58′0.31″N 103°8′37.81″W
- Country: United States
- State: New Mexico
- County: Roosevelt
- Region: Llano Estacado
- Elevation: 4,177 ft (1,273 m)

Population (2025)
  - Total: 0
- Time zone: UTC-7 (Mountain (MST))
- Zip code: 88132
- Area code: 575
- GNIS feature ID: 898557

Inez is an unincorporated community and ghost town located in Roosevelt County in the U.S. state of New Mexico. It was entered into the Geographic Names Information System (GNIS) on November 13, 1981. The community is located approximately 20 miles southwest of Portales, and is said to be named by the first postmaster Evin P. Williams after Inez Mullins, an early resident of the settlement.

== Buildings ==
The community is home to Inez Cemetery, as well as the Inez Methodist Church, organized in 1909. Additionally, the first post office in Inez was established on February 28, 1908, which is said to have been discontinued sometime in 1930; however, no official records corroborate this claim. Very little remains of the ghost town.
