= Las Tusas, New Mexico =

- Census-designated place
- Location within New Mexico Location within the United States
- Coordinates: 35°16′22″N 108°07′25″W
- Country: United States
- State: New Mexico
- County: Cibola

Area
  - Total: 1.27 sq mi (3.28 km^{2})
  - Land: 1.27 sq mi (3.28 km^{2})
  - Water: 0 sq mi (0.00 km^{2})
- Elevation: 7,497 ft (2,285 m)

Population (2020)
  - Total: 253
  - Density: 199.8/sq mi (77.16/km^{2})
- Time zone: UTC-7 (Mountain (MST))
  - Summer (DST): UTC-6 (MDT)
- Area code: 505
- FIPS code: 35-39792
- GNIS feature ID: 2584058

Las Tusas is a census-designated place (CDP) in Cibola County, New Mexico, United States. As of the 2020 census, Las Tusas had a population of 253. At the 2010 census the CDP was known as Bluewater Acres.

== Geography ==
Las Tusas is located in northwestern Cibola County, near the southern tip of Bluewater Lake, a reservoir on Bluewater Creek north of Salitre Mesa. New Mexico State Road 612 (Bluewater Road) leads north from the community 12 miles (19 km) to Thoreau and Interstate 40. A Forest Service road leads south from Bluewater Acres through Cibola National Forest 25 miles (40 km) to NM 53 near the Continental Divide.

According to the United States Census Bureau, the Las Tusas CDP has a total area of 1.3 square miles (3.3 km^{2}), all land.

== Demographics ==
Historical population
Census	Pop.	Note	%±
2020	253		—
U.S. Decennial Census
