= North Hurley, New Mexico =

- Census-designated place
- Location within New Mexico Location within the United States
- Coordinates: 32°43′02″N 108°07′30″W
- Country: United States
- State: New Mexico
- County: Grant

Area
  - Total: 1.53 sq mi (3.95 km^{2})
  - Land: 1.53 sq mi (3.95 km^{2})
  - Water: 0 sq mi (0.00 km^{2})
- Elevation: 5,761 ft (1,756 m)

Population (2020)
  - Total: 242
  - Density: 158.5/sq mi (61.19/km^{2})
- Time zone: UTC-7 (Mountain (MST))
  - Summer (DST): UTC-6 (MDT)
- Area code: 575
- GNIS feature ID: 2584165

North Hurley is a census-designated place in Grant County, New Mexico, United States. As of the 2020 census, North Hurley had a population of 242. The community is located north of Hurley along U.S. Route 180.

== Geography ==
According to the U.S. Census Bureau, the community has an area of 1.530 square miles (3.96 km^{2}), all land.

== Demographics ==
Historical population
Census	Pop.	Note	%±
2020	242		—
U.S. Decennial Census
