= Lake Roberts Heights, New Mexico =

- Census-designated place
- Location within New Mexico Location within the United States
- Coordinates: 33°01′35″N 108°07′48″W
- Country: United States
- State: New Mexico
- County: Grant

Area
  - Total: 0.76 sq mi (1.98 km^{2})
  - Land: 0.76 sq mi (1.98 km^{2})
  - Water: 0 sq mi (0.00 km^{2})
- Elevation: 6,113 ft (1,863 m)

Population (2020)
  - Total: 22
  - Density: 28.9/sq mi (11.14/km^{2})
- Time zone: UTC-7 (Mountain (MST))
  - Summer (DST): UTC-6 (MDT)
- Area code: 575
- GNIS feature ID: 2584127

Lake Roberts Heights is a census-designated place in Grant County, New Mexico, United States. As of the 2020 census, Lake Roberts Heights had a population of 22. New Mexico State Road 35 passes through the community.

== Geography ==
According to the U.S. Census Bureau, the community has an area of 0.763 square miles (1.98 km^{2}), all land.

== Demographics ==
Historical population
Census	Pop.	Note	%±
2020	22		—
U.S. Decennial Census
