= East Pecos, New Mexico =

- Unincorporated community
- Location within New Mexico
- Coordinates: 35°34′34″N 105°38′30″W
- Country: United States
- State: New Mexico
- County: San Miguel

Area
  - Total: 3.60 sq mi (9.32 km^{2})
  - Land: 3.60 sq mi (9.32 km^{2})
  - Water: 0 sq mi (0.00 km^{2})
- Elevation: 7,133 ft (2,174 m)

Population (2020)
  - Total: 660
  - Density: 183.4/sq mi (70.82/km^{2})
- Time zone: UTC-7 (Mountain (MST))
  - Summer (DST): UTC-6 (MDT)
- Area code: 505
- GNIS feature ID: 2629109

East Pecos is an unincorporated community and census-designated place in San Miguel County, New Mexico, United States. As of the 2020 census, East Pecos had a population of 660.

== Geography ==
According to the U.S. Census Bureau, the community has an area of 3.603 square miles (9.33 km^{2}), all land.

== Demographics ==
Historical population
Census	Pop.	Note	%±
2020	660		—
U.S. Decennial Census

== Education ==
It is within Pecos Independent Schools.
