= Indian Hills, New Mexico =

- Census-designated place
- Location within New Mexico
- Coordinates: 34°59′03″N 106°07′25″W
- Country: United States
- State: New Mexico
- County: Torrance

Area
  - Total: 5.71 sq mi (14.79 km^{2})
  - Land: 5.71 sq mi (14.79 km^{2})
  - Water: 0 sq mi (0.00 km^{2})
- Elevation: 6,457 ft (1,968 m)

Population (2020)
  - Total: 947
  - Density: 165.8/sq mi (64.02/km^{2})
- Time zone: UTC-7 (Mountain (MST))
  - Summer (DST): UTC-6 (MDT)
- Area code: 505
- GNIS feature ID: 2584089

Indian Hills is an unincorporated community and census-designated place in Torrance County, New Mexico, United States. As of the 2020 census, Indian Hills had a population of 947.

== Geography ==
According to the U.S. Census Bureau, the community has an area of 5.714 square miles (14.80 km^{2}), all land.

== Demographics ==
Historical population
Census	Pop.	Note	%±
2020	947		—
U.S. Decennial Census

== Education ==
It is in the Moriarty-Edgewood School District.
