= Canoncito, San Miguel County, New Mexico =

Canoncito, New Mexico
- Unincorporated community
- Location within New Mexico
- Coordinates: 35°47′56″N 105°19′21″W
- Country: United States
- State: New Mexico
- County: San Miguel
- Elevation: 7,234 ft (2,205 m)
- Time zone: UTC-7 (Mountain (MST))
  - Summer (DST): UTC-6 (MDT)
- Area code: 505
- GNIS feature ID: 904700

Canoncito is an unincorporated community in San Miguel County, New Mexico, United States. Canoncito is 15.2 miles (24.5 km) north-northwest of Las Vegas.
