= Arroyo Hondo, Santa Fe County, New Mexico =

Arroyo Hondo, New Mexico
- Census-designated place
- Location within New Mexico Location within the United States
- Coordinates: 35°36′59″N 105°56′25″W
- Country: United States
- State: New Mexico
- County: Santa Fe

Area
  - Total: 3.17 sq mi (8.22 km^{2})
  - Land: 3.17 sq mi (8.22 km^{2})
  - Water: 0 sq mi (0.00 km^{2})
- Elevation: 6,962 ft (2,122 m)

Population (2020)
  - Total: 331
  - Density: 104.3/sq mi (40.28/km^{2})
- Time zone: UTC-7 (Mountain (MST))
  - Summer (DST): UTC-6 (MDT)
- ZIP Code: 87508 (Santa Fe)
- Area code: 505
- FIPS code: 35-05002
- GNIS feature ID: 2812758

Arroyo Hondo is an unincorporated community and census-designated place (CDP) in Santa Fe County, New Mexico, United States. It was first listed as a CDP prior to the 2020 census.

== Geography ==
The CDP is north of the geographic center of the county and is bordered to the north by Conejo, to the east and south by Sunlit Hills, and to the southeast by Seton Village. It is 6 miles (10 km) south of the center of Santa Fe, the state capital.

The CDP Arroyo Hondo region is drained by the intermittent stream Arroyo Hondo, which has confluence with Cienega Creek near La Cienega.

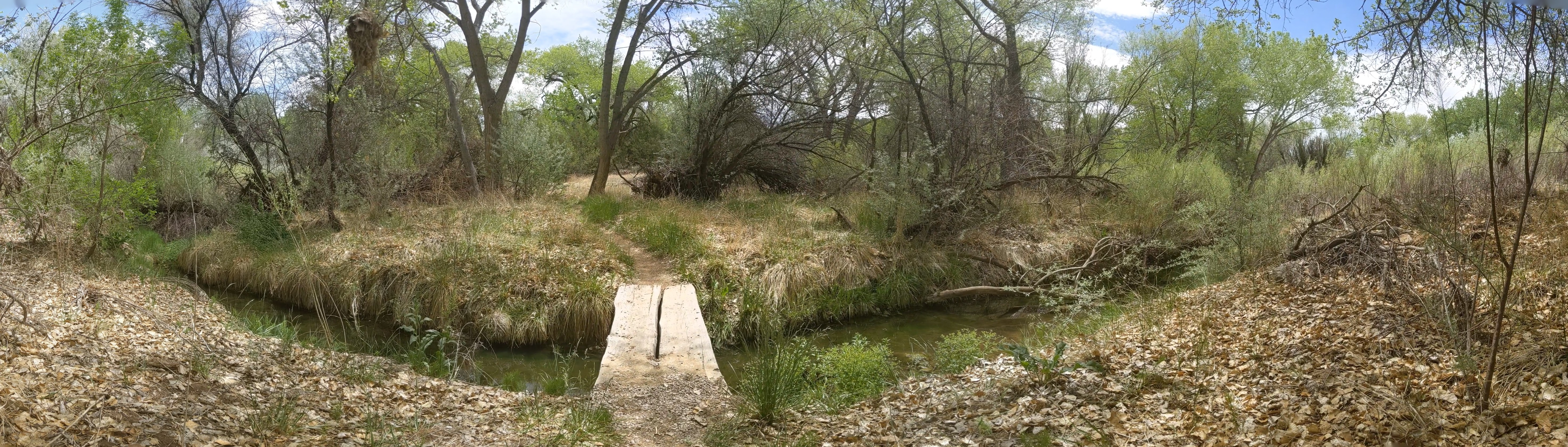
Arroyo Hondo, a tributary to Cienega Creek above La Cienega

== Demographics ==
Historical population
Census	Pop.	Note	%±
2020	331		—
U.S. Decennial Census
