= Homer C Jones, New Mexico =

- Census-designated place
- Location within New Mexico Location within the United States
- Coordinates: 35°18′23″N 108°6′12″W
- Country: United States
- State: New Mexico
- County: McKinley

Area
  - Total: 0.25 sq mi (0.65 km^{2})
  - Land: 0.25 sq mi (0.65 km^{2})
  - Water: 0 sq mi (0.00 km^{2})
- Elevation: 7,428 ft (2,264 m)

Population (2020)
  - Total: 113
  - Density: 453.4/sq mi (175.05/km^{2})
- Time zone: UTC-7 (Mountain (MST))
  - Summer (DST): UTC-6 (MDT)
- ZIP Code: 87045 (Prewitt)
- Area code: 505
- FIPS code: 35-33122
- GNIS feature ID: 2806720

Homer C Jones is an unincorporated community and census-designated place (CDP) in McKinley County, New Mexico, United States. As of the 2020 census, the first year it was listed as a CDP, the population was 113.

== Geography ==
The community is on the southern edge of McKinley County, bordered to the south by the community of Stoneridge in Cibola County. New Mexico State Road 412 passes through the CDP, leading northeast 6 miles (10 km) to Interstate 40 in Prewitt.

According to the U.S. Census Bureau, the Homer C Jones CDP has an area of 0.25 square miles (0.65 km^{2}), all land. The area drains southwards to the nearby Bluewater Creek, an east-flowing tributary of the Rio San Jose and part of the Rio Puerco watershed leading to the Rio Grande.

== Education ==
Its schools are Gallup-McKinley County Schools.
