= South Acomita Village, New Mexico =

- Census-designated place
- Location within the state of New Mexico
- Coordinates: 35°03′12″N 107°34′20″W
- Country: United States
- State: New Mexico
- County: Cibola

Area
  - Total: 1.17 sq mi (3.02 km^{2})
  - Land: 1.17 sq mi (3.02 km^{2})
  - Water: 0 sq mi (0.00 km^{2})
- Elevation: 6,116 ft (1,864 m)

Population (2020)
  - Total: 130
  - Density: 110/sq mi (43/km^{2})
- Time zone: UTC-7 (Mountain (MST))
  - Summer (DST): UTC-6 (MDT)
- Area code: 505
- FIPS code: 35-73925
- GNIS feature ID: 2585650

South Acomita Village is a census designated place (CDP) in Cibola County, New Mexico, United States. As of the 2020 census, South Acomita Village had a population of 130.

== Geography ==
South Acomita Village is located in northern Cibola County near the northeastern corner of Acoma Pueblo. It occupies land on the south side of the valley of the Rio San Jose. North Acomita Village is directly to the north on Indian Service Route 30. Exit 102 on Interstate 40 at Sky City Casino is 1.5 miles (2.4 km) to the north of South Acomita.

According to the United States Census Bureau, the CDP has a total area of 0.54 square miles (1.4 km^{2}), all land.

== Demographics ==
Historical population
| Census | Pop. | Note | %± |
|---|---|---|---|
| 2020 | 130 | | — |
U.S. Decennial Census

== Education ==
All public schools in the county are operated by Grants/Cibola County Schools.

== See also ==
- Acoma Pueblo
- Acoma Indian Reservation
