= Lybrook, New Mexico =

- Census-designated place
- Location within New Mexico Location within the United States
- Coordinates: 36°13′44″N 107°33′18″W
- Country: United States
- State: New Mexico
- County: Rio Arriba

Area
  - Total: 3.89 sq mi (10.07 km^{2})
  - Land: 3.88 sq mi (10.05 km^{2})
  - Water: 0.0039 sq mi (0.01 km^{2})
- Elevation: 7,179 ft (2,188 m)

Population (2020)
  - Total: 19
  - Density: 4.9/sq mi (1.89/km^{2})
- Time zone: UTC-7 (Mountain (MST))
  - Summer (DST): UTC-6 (MDT)
- ZIP Code: 87013 (Cuba)
- Area code: 575
- FIPS code: 35-45635
- GNIS feature ID: 2806742

Lybrook is an unincorporated community and census-designated place (CDP) in Rio Arriba County, New Mexico, United States. It was first listed as a CDP prior to the 2020 census. As of the 2020 census, Lybrook had a population of 19.

The CDP is in the southwest corner of the county, bordered to the south by Sandoval County. U.S. Route 550 passes through the center of the community, leading northwest 48 miles (77 km) to Bloomfield and southeast 40 miles (64 km) to Cuba.

== Demographics ==
Historical population
Census	Pop.	Note	%±
2020	19		—
U.S. Decennial Census

== Climate ==
According to the Köppen Climate Classification system, Lybrook has a cold semi-arid climate, abbreviated "BSk" on climate maps. The hottest temperature recorded in Lybrook was 100 °F (37.8 °C) on July 22, 1952, while the coldest temperature recorded was −28 °F (−33.3 °C) on January 7, 1971.

Climate data for Lybrook, New Mexico, 1991–2020 normals, extremes 1951–2011
Month	Jan	Feb	Mar	Apr	May	Jun	Jul	Aug	Sep	Oct	Nov	Dec	Year
Record high °F (°C)	61 (16)	67 (19)	73 (23)	86 (30)	91 (33)	97 (36)	100 (38)	97 (36)	89 (32)	86 (30)	77 (25)	65 (18)	100 (38)
Mean maximum °F (°C)	51.8 (11.0)	56.5 (13.6)	65.7 (18.7)	72.8 (22.7)	81.1 (27.3)	88.6 (31.4)	91.4 (33.0)	88.6 (31.4)	83.7 (28.7)	73.9 (23.3)	63.2 (17.3)	52.8 (11.6)	92.2 (33.4)
Mean daily maximum °F (°C)	38.7 (3.7)	43.8 (6.6)	52.8 (11.6)	60.2 (15.7)	69.8 (21.0)	81.3 (27.4)	84.1 (28.9)	81.4 (27.4)	74.8 (23.8)	62.6 (17.0)	49.2 (9.6)	39.2 (4.0)	61.5 (16.4)
Daily mean °F (°C)	27.5 (−2.5)	32.0 (0.0)	39.7 (4.3)	46.6 (8.1)	55.8 (13.2)	66.7 (19.3)	70.2 (21.2)	67.9 (19.9)	61.4 (16.3)	49.5 (9.7)	37.0 (2.8)	27.4 (−2.6)	48.5 (9.1)
Mean daily minimum °F (°C)	16.3 (−8.7)	20.3 (−6.5)	26.5 (−3.1)	33.0 (0.6)	41.7 (5.4)	52.1 (11.2)	56.3 (13.5)	54.4 (12.4)	48.0 (8.9)	36.5 (2.5)	24.7 (−4.1)	15.5 (−9.2)	35.4 (1.9)
Mean minimum °F (°C)	1.3 (−17.1)	4.8 (−15.1)	13.7 (−10.2)	21.5 (−5.8)	29.5 (−1.4)	37.9 (3.3)	47.9 (8.8)	45.9 (7.7)	35.4 (1.9)	22.7 (−5.2)	9.6 (−12.4)	0.8 (−17.3)	−3.7 (−19.8)
Record low °F (°C)	−28 (−33)	−18 (−28)	0 (−18)	4 (−16)	18 (−8)	24 (−4)	36 (2)	34 (1)	26 (−3)	11 (−12)	−3 (−19)	−18 (−28)	−28 (−33)
Average precipitation inches (mm)	0.84 (21)	0.52 (13)	0.33 (8.4)	0.58 (15)	0.86 (22)	0.52 (13)	1.48 (38)	1.97 (50)	1.32 (34)	0.86 (22)	0.49 (12)	0.59 (15)	10.36 (263.4)
Average snowfall inches (cm)	5.9 (15)	2.9 (7.4)	1.4 (3.6)	1.3 (3.3)	0.1 (0.25)	0.0 (0.0)	0.0 (0.0)	0.0 (0.0)	0.0 (0.0)	0.6 (1.5)	1.0 (2.5)	3.7 (9.4)	16.9 (42.95)
Average precipitation days (≥ 0.01 in)	4.6	4.8	3.1	3.6	2.7	2.5	5.3	7.4	4.3	3.8	2.3	3.4	47.8
Average snowy days (≥ 0.1 in)	3.3	2.5	1.5	1.1	0.1	0.0	0.0	0.0	0.0	0.4	0.9	2.9	12.7
Source 1: NOAA
Source 2: XMACIS2 (mean maxima/minima 1981–2010)
