= Manzano Springs, New Mexico =

- Census-designated place
- Location within New Mexico
- Coordinates: 34°57′50″N 106°14′25″W
- Country: United States
- State: New Mexico
- County: Torrance, Bernalillo

Area
  - Total: 2.28 sq mi (5.90 km^{2})
  - Land: 2.28 sq mi (5.90 km^{2})
  - Water: 0 sq mi (0.00 km^{2})
- Elevation: 6,969 ft (2,124 m)

Population (2020)
  - Total: 154
  - Density: 67.5/sq mi (26.08/km^{2})
- Time zone: UTC-7 (Mountain (MST))
  - Summer (DST): UTC-6 (MDT)
- Area code: 505
- FIPS code: 35-46770
- GNIS feature ID: 2584177

Manzano Springs is a census-designated place (CDP) in Torrance and Bernalillo counties, New Mexico, United States. As of the 2020 census, Manzano Springs had a population of 154. It is part of the Albuquerque Metropolitan Statistical Area .

== Geography ==
Manzano Springs is located in northwestern Torrance County and extends west into southeastern Bernalillo County. The main road through the CDP is New Mexico State Road 222.

According to the United States Census Bureau, the CDP has a total area of 2.3 square miles (5.9 km^{2}), all land.

== Demographics ==
Historical population
Census	Pop.	Note	%±
2020	154		—
U.S. Decennial Census

== Education ==
It is zoned to Moriarty Municipal Schools, all parts in both counties included.
