= North Acomita Village, New Mexico =

- Census-designated place
- Location of North Acomita Village in New Mexico

- Location in the United States
- Coordinates: 35°04′02″N 107°33′53″W
- Country: United States
- State: New Mexico
- County: Cibola

Area
  - Total: 3.87 sq mi (10.03 km^{2})
  - Land: 3.87 sq mi (10.03 km^{2})
  - Water: 0 sq mi (0.00 km^{2})
- Elevation: 6,073 ft (1,851 m)

Population (2020)
  - Total: 357
  - Density: 92.2/sq mi (35.61/km^{2})
- Time zone: UTC-7 (Mountain (MST))
  - Summer (DST): UTC-6 (MDT)
- Area code: 505
- FIPS code: 35-52300
- GNIS feature ID: 2408932

North Acomita Village is a census-designated place (CDP) in Cibola County, New Mexico, United States. As of the 2020 census, North Acomita Village had a population of 357.

== Geography ==
North Acomita Village is located in northeastern Cibola County. It occupies the northeastern corner of the Acoma Pueblo land and is situated on the north side of the Rio San Jose and south of Interstate 40. Two I-40 exits (100 and 102) serve the North Acomita area. South Acomita Village is directly to the south, across the Rio San Jose.

According to the United States Census Bureau, the CDP has a total area of 2.9 square miles (7.4 km^{2}), all land.

== Demographics ==
Historical population
Census	Pop.	Note	%±
2020	357		—
U.S. Decennial Census

As of the census of 2000, there were 288 people, 90 households, and 63 families residing in the CDP. The population density was 103.3 inhabitants per square mile (39.9/km^{2}). There were 104 housing units at an average density of 37.3 per square mile (14.4/km^{2}). The racial makeup of the CDP was 3.47% White, 95.83% Native American, and 0.69% from two or more races. Hispanic or Latino of any race were 3.12% of the population.

There were 90 households, out of which 32.2% had children under the age of 18 living with them, 41.1% were married couples living together, 20.0% had a female householder with no husband present, and 30.0% were non-families. 24.4% of all households were made up of individuals, and 7.8% had someone living alone who was 65 years of age or older. The average household size was 3.20 and the average family size was 3.87.

In the CDP, the population was spread out, with 29.5% under the age of 18, 10.1% from 18 to 24, 26.0% from 25 to 44, 24.7% from 45 to 64, and 9.7% who were 65 years of age or older. The median age was 34 years. For every 100 females, there were 95.9 males. For every 100 females age 18 and over, there were 76.5 males.

The median income for a household in the CDP was $24,375, and the median income for a family was $25,000. Males had a median income of $26,250 versus $20,000 for females. The per capita income for the CDP was $10,569. About 36.2% of families and 33.2% of the population were below the poverty line, including 40.2% of those under the age of eighteen and 50.0% of those 65 or over.

== Education ==
All public schools in the county are operated by Grants/Cibola County Schools.

== See also ==
- Acoma Pueblo
- Acoma Indian Reservation
