= Acomita Lake, New Mexico =

- Census-designated place
- Location of Acomita Lake, New Mexico

- Location in the United States
- Coordinates: 35°04′01″N 107°37′25″W
- Country: United States
- State: New Mexico
- County: Cibola

Area
  - Total: 4.03 sq mi (10.45 km^{2})
  - Land: 3.92 sq mi (10.14 km^{2})
  - Water: 0.12 sq mi (0.31 km^{2})
- Elevation: 6,103 ft (1,860 m)

Population (2020)
  - Total: 339
  - Density: 86.6/sq mi (33.43/km^{2})
- Time zone: UTC-7 (Mountain (MST))
  - Summer (DST): UTC-6 (MDT)
- Area code: 505
- FIPS code: 35-00765
- GNIS feature ID: 2407695

Acomita Lake is a census-designated place (CDP) in Cibola County, New Mexico, United States. The population was 339 at the 2020 census.

== Geography ==
Acomita Lake is located in northeastern Cibola County along the northern edge of the Acoma Indian Reservation. Interstate 40 runs past the northern side of the community, with access from exits 96 and 100. A reservoir named Acomita Lake is in the eastern part of the community, and the Rio San Jose, a tributary of the Rio Puerco, forms the southern edge of the community.

According to the United States Census Bureau, the CDP has a total area of 3.6 square miles (9.2 km^{2}), of which 3.4 square miles (8.9 km^{2}) is land and 0.12 square miles (0.3 km^{2}), or 3.38%, is water.

== Demographics ==
Historical population
Census	Pop.	Note	%±
2020	339		—
U.S. Decennial Census

As of the census of 2020, there were 339 people, 147 households, and 138 families residing in the CDP. The population density was 99.7 inhabitants per square mile (38.5/km^{2}). There were 95 housing units at an average density of 27.9 per square mile (10.8/km^{2}). The racial makeup of the CDP was 1.1% White, 94.9% Native American, 0.3% Asian, and 0.3% from other races. Hispanic or Latino of any race were 2.36% of the population.

There were 147 households, out of which 67.3% had children under the age of 18 living with them, 62.6% were married couples living together, 10.2% had a female householder with no spouse present, 13.6% had a male householder with no spouse present, and 6.1% were non-families. No households reported being made up of individuals. The average household size was 5.44 and the average family size was 5.57.

In the CDP, the population was spread out, with 25.5% under the age of 18, 6.8% from 18 to 24, 35.3% from 25 to 44, 25.1% from 45 to 64, and 7.4% who were 65 years of age or older. The median age was 37 years. For every 100 females, there were 131.9 males. For every 100 females age 18 and over, there were 121.6 males.

The median income for a household in the CDP was $72,585, and the median income for a family was $72,557. Males had a median income of $21,806 versus $17,417 for females. The per capita income for the CDP was $68,634. 12.0% of the population and 11.6% of families were below the poverty line. Out of the total population, 11.8% of those under the age of 18 were living below the poverty line.

== Education ==
All public schools in the county are operated by Grants/Cibola County Schools.

== See also ==
- Acoma Pueblo
- Acoma Indian Reservation
