= Sedillo, New Mexico =

- Census-designated place
- Location within New Mexico
- Coordinates: 35°05′26″N 106°17′13″W
- Country: United States
- State: New Mexico
- County: Bernalillo

Area
  - Total: 2.75 sq mi (7.11 km^{2})
  - Land: 2.75 sq mi (7.11 km^{2})
  - Water: 0 sq mi (0.00 km^{2})
- Elevation: 7,146 ft (2,178 m)

Population (2020)
  - Total: 670
  - Density: 244.0/sq mi (94.21/km^{2})
- Time zone: UTC-7 (Mountain (MST))
  - Summer (DST): UTC-6 (MDT)
- Area code: 505
- GNIS feature ID: 2584217

Sedillo is a census-designated place in Bernalillo County, New Mexico, United States. As of the 2020 census, Sedillo had a population of 670. The community is located along Interstate 40.

== Demographics ==
Historical population
Census	Pop.	Note	%±
2020	670		—
U.S. Decennial Census

== Education ==
The area is divided between Albuquerque Public Schools and Moriarty Municipal Schools.
