= National Register of Historic Places listings in Cibola County, New Mexico =

Location of Cibola County in New Mexico

This is a list of the National Register of Historic Places listings in Cibola County, New Mexico.

This is intended to be a complete list of the properties and districts on the National Register of Historic Places in Cibola County, New Mexico, United States. Latitude and longitude coordinates are provided for many National Register properties and districts; these locations may be seen together in a map.

There are 19 properties and districts listed on the National Register in the county, including 4 National Historic Landmarks. All of the places within the county listed on the National Register, with the exception of Acoma, Hawikuh, and San Estevan Del Rey Mission Church, are also recorded on the State Register of Cultural Properties.

This National Park Service list is complete through NPS recent listings posted January 9, 2026.

Contents: NRHP in New Mexico by county
Bernalillo – Catron – Chaves – Cibola – Colfax – Curry – De Baca – Doña Ana – Eddy – Grant – Guadalupe – Harding – Hidalgo – Lea – Lincoln – Los Alamos – Luna – McKinley – Mora – Otero – Quay – Rio Arriba – Roosevelt – San Juan – San Miguel – Sandoval – Santa Fe – Sierra – Socorro – Taos – Torrance – Union – Valencia

== Current listings ==
	Name on the Register	Image	Date listed	Location	City or town	Description
1	Acoma	Acoma	October 15, 1966 (#66000500)	Indian Service Road 38; 34°53′47″N 107°34′55″W	Casa Blanca	
2	Acoma Curio Shop	Acoma Curio Shop	October 7, 2009 (#09000817)	1090 State Road 124; 35°04′56″N 107°35′54″W	San Fidel	
3	Bowlin's Old Crater Trading Post	Bowlin's Old Crater Trading Post	March 21, 2006 (#06000150)	7650 Frontage Rd. 35°17′03″N 107°59′11″W	Bluewater	
4	Candelaria Pueblo	Candelaria Pueblo	March 10, 1983 (#83001619)	El Malpais National Monument	Grants	
5	Charley's Automotive Service	Charley's Automotive Service	October 4, 2017 (#100001715)	1310 W. Santa Fe Ave. 35°09′19″N 107°51′50″W	Grants	
6	Dittert Site	Dittert Site	August 22, 1977 (#77000931)	El Malpais National Conservation Area; 34°39′33″N 107°58′20″W	Grants	
7	El Morro National Monument	El Morro National Monument	October 15, 1966 (#66000043)	State Road 53; 35°02′18″N 108°21′12″W	El Morro	
8	Grants-Milan Flight Service Station	Grants-Milan Flight Service Station	August 3, 2015 (#15000492)	1116 N. Dale Carnutte Rd. 35°09′59″N 107°53′51″W	Grants	
9	Hawikuh	Hawikuh	October 15, 1966 (#66000502)	12 miles southwest of Zuni on the Zuni Indian Reservation; 34°56′25″N 108°59′57″W	Zuni Pueblo	
10	Laguna Pueblo	Laguna Pueblo	June 19, 1973 (#73001154)	E junction of I-40 and State Road 124; 35°01′08″N 107°23′04″W	Albuquerque	
11	Route 66 Rural Historic District: Laguna to McCartys	Route 66 Rural Historic District: Laguna to McCartys	January 13, 1994 (#93001466)	State Road 124 between interchanges on Interstate 40; 35°03′43″N 107°29′53″W	Cubero	
12	Route 66, State Maintained from McCartys to Grants	Route 66, State Maintained from McCartys to Grants	November 19, 1997 (#97001398)	Former U.S. Route 66 from east of McCartys to east of Grants; 35°05′29″N 107°44′15″W	Grants	
13	Route 66, State maintained from Milan to Continental Divide	Route 66, State maintained from Milan to Continental Divide	November 19, 1997 (#97001394)	Along former U.S. Route 66 from west of Milan to the Continental Divide; 35°22′37″N 108°06′48″W	Continental Divide	
14	St. Theresa Community Center	St. Theresa Community Center	June 30, 2022 (#100007877)	400 East High St. 35°08′57″N 107°50′40″W	Grants	
15	San Estevan del Rey Mission Church	San Estevan del Rey Mission Church	April 15, 1970 (#70000417)	State Road 23; 34°53′50″N 107°34′57″W	Acoma	
16	San Jose de la Laguna Mission and Convento	San Jose de la Laguna Mission and Convento	January 29, 1973 (#73001155)	Address unknown 35°02′05″N 107°23′17″W	Laguna Pueblo	
17	San Mateo Archeological Site		May 17, 1979 (#79001563)	Address Restricted	San Mateo	
18	Village of Encinal Day School		August 8, 1980 (#80002576)	NW of Encinal; 35°07′14″N 107°27′48″W	Encinal	
19	Zuni-Cibola Complex		December 2, 1974 (#74002267)	Address Restricted	Zuni Pueblo	Extends into McKinley County

== See also ==
- List of National Historic Landmarks in New Mexico
- National Register of Historic Places listings in New Mexico
