= Seama =

Seama may refer to:

- Seama, California
- Seama, New Mexico
