= Laguna Pueblo =

Native American Pueblo tribe

Pueblo of Laguna, New Mexico
Total population
- 6,758 (2010)

Regions with significant populations
- United States (New Mexico)

Languages
- Keresan language, English language

Religion
- Traditional tribal religion, Christianity (Roman Catholicism and other)

Related ethnic groups
- Acoma Pueblo, other Keres people (Cochiti Pueblo, San Felipe Pueblo, Santo Domingo Pueblo, and Zia Pueblo)

- Laguna Pueblo
- U.S. National Register of Historic Places
- U.S. Historic district
- NM State Register of Cultural Properties
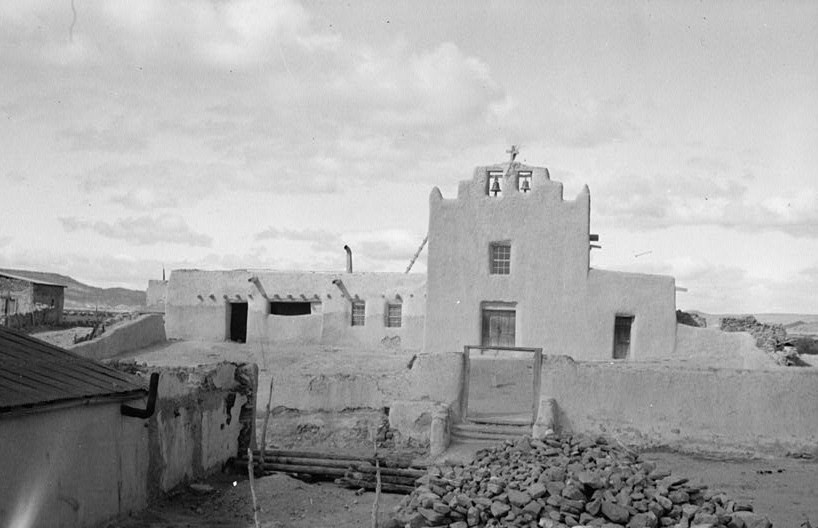
- Laguna Mission

- Location within New Mexico Location within the United States
- Nearest city: Albuquerque, New Mexico
- Coordinates: 35°1′8″N 107°23′04″W
- Area: 108 acres (44 ha)
- Built: 1699
- Architectural style: Pueblo
- NRHP reference No.: 73001154
- NMSRCP No.: 228

Significant dates
- Added to NRHP: June 19, 1973
- Designated NMSRCP: December 30, 1971

The Pueblo of Laguna, New Mexico (Western Keres: Kawaika; Western Keres pronunciation: [kʰɑwɑjkʰɑ]) is a federally recognized tribe of Native American Pueblo people in west-central New Mexico, near the city of Albuquerque, in the United States. Part of the Laguna territory is included in the Albuquerque metropolitan area, chiefly around Laguna's Route 66 Resort and Casino. The name, Laguna, is Spanish (meaning "small lake") and derives from the lake on their reservation. This body of water was formed by an ancient dam that was constructed by the Laguna people. After the Pueblo Revolt of 1680–1696, the Mission San José de la Laguna was erected by the Spanish at the old pueblo (now Old Laguna) and finished around July 4, 1699.

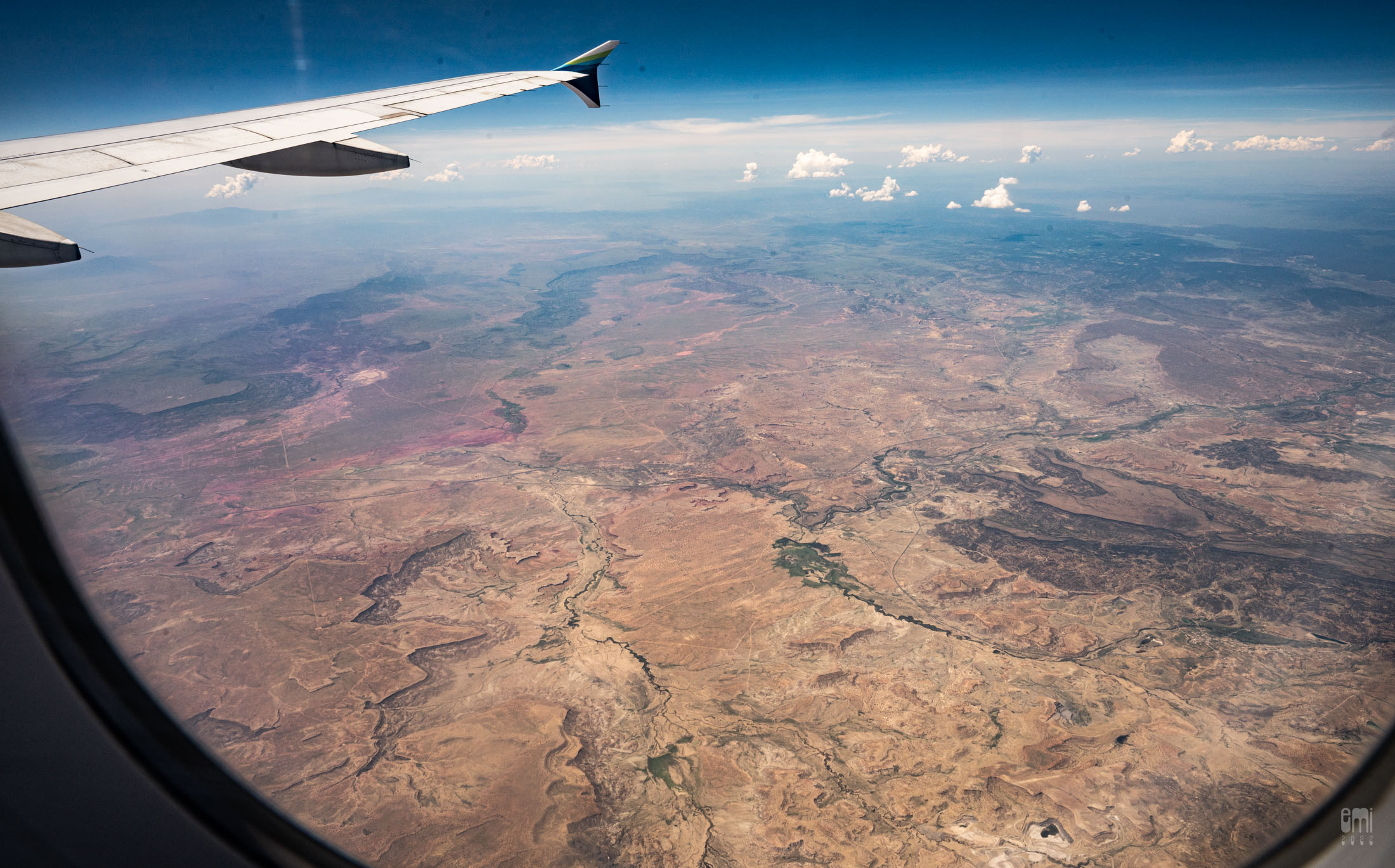
Photo of Laguna Pueblo from airplane

== History ==
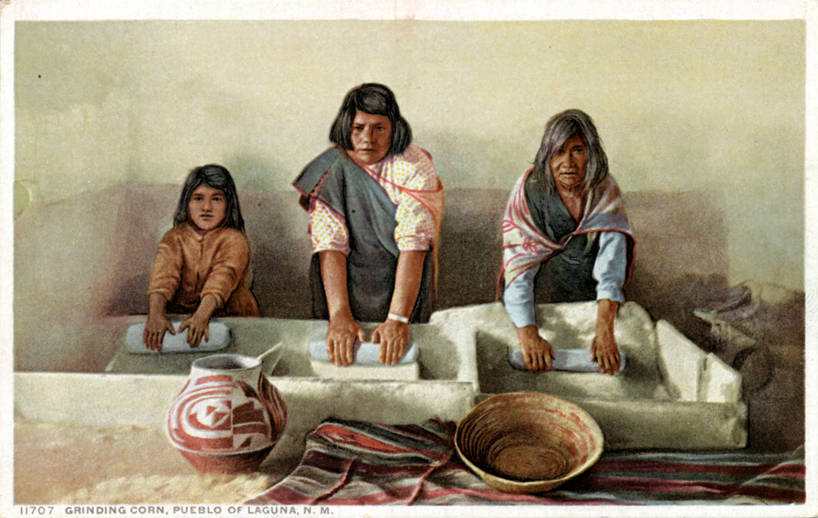
Grinding maize in Laguna Pueblo, c. 1900s

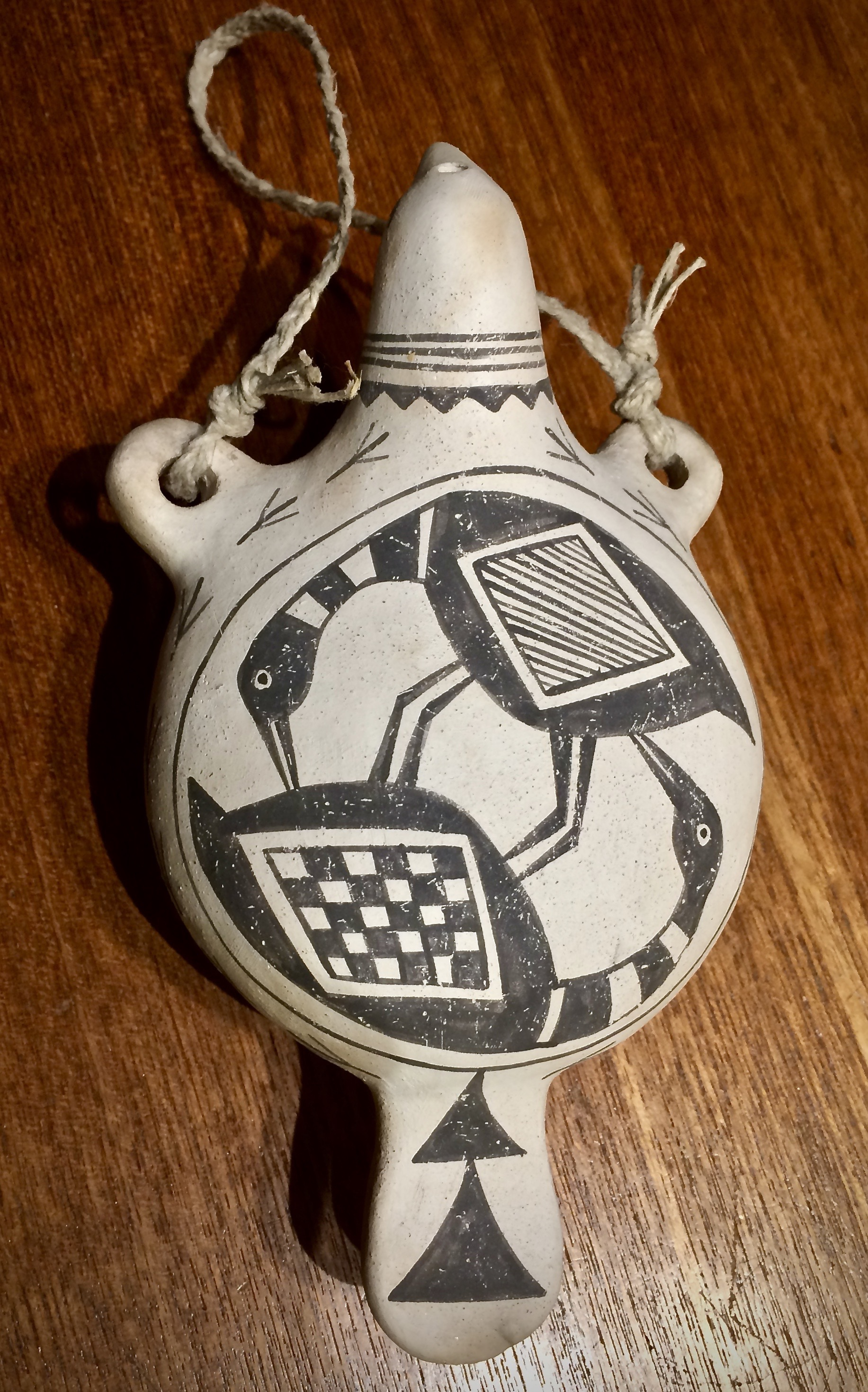
Ceramic Laguna canteen

=== Pre-Colonial Archaeology and Post-Revolt Ethnogenesis ===
While popular histories frequently attribute the founding of Laguna Pueblo to Spanish Governor Pedro Rodríguez Cubero in 1699, extensive archaeological surveys of over 1,400 ancestral sites across the reservation have conclusively pushed continuous human occupation in the Rio San Jose basin back to the Archaic Period (circa 6500 BCE). Following the Pueblo Revolt of 1680 and the subsequent Spanish reconquest by Diego de Vargas, the site of Old Laguna functioned as a critical geographic sanctuary. The modern community underwent a complex process of ethnogenesis, absorbing large populations of Keresan, Tanoan, and Hemish refugees fleeing Spanish reprisal campaigns from neighboring Pueblos, including Cochiti, Santo Domingo, and Cieneguilla. This historical influx transformed Laguna into a diverse multi-pueblo coalition well before the formalization of the Spanish mission facility in 1701.

=== The San José painting litigation (1857) ===
In 1857, the Pueblo of Laguna was the defendant in a landmark property rights case, Pueblo of Acoma v. Pueblo of Laguna (1 N.M. 220), which was argued before the Supreme Court of the Territory of New Mexico. The conflict involved a historic, life-size oil painting on canvas depicting Saint Joseph (San José) holding the infant Jesus, which was sent to the region by King Charles II of Spain in the late 17th century. Both sovereign Pueblos placed immense spiritual value on the object, attributing miraculous properties to the painting, most notably the power to bring life-sustaining rain to parched agricultural lands and ward off epidemics.

According to court records and regional history, Acoma Pueblo had formally borrowed the painting from Laguna within living memory to alleviate a severe drought and plague infecting their community. Following a subsequent agricultural recovery, Acoma leadership refused to return the canvas, sparking a decades-long inter-tribal property dispute that church authorities failed to arbitrate. Upon reviewing the case under American civil procedure, the Territorial Supreme Court ruled in favor of Acoma, establishing an early federal precedent that recognized Native American Pueblos as distinct political entities with the full legal status of a body corporate, granting them the right to sue and protect their assets in United States courts.

=== Late 19th-century factionalism and the founding of Mesita ===
During the 1870s and 1880s, the Pueblo of Laguna experienced a severe internal political and religious schism driven by the arrival of outside modernizing influences, Christian missionaries, and white government surveyors who married into the tribe. Central to this shift were brothers Walter and Robert Marmon, white Union Army veterans and surveyors who married Laguna women, integrated into the tribal hierarchy, and were subsequently elected to leadership positions, with Robert Marmon serving as Pueblo Governor. The Marmons, alongside Presbyterian missionary John Menaul, aggressively promoted Western secular education, Protestantism, and industrial alignment with the oncoming railroad, forming a political faction known as the "Progressives".

This rapid acculturation triggered intense friction with the "Conservative" or traditionalist faction, who sought to protect traditional Keresan kiva religious structures, community governance, and historical ties to the Roman Catholic Church. Tensions escalated dramatically when Progressive leaders, backed by newly converted tribal members, closed the historic St. Joseph Mission Church, utilizing it temporarily as a burro corral, and threatened the demolition of Catholic and traditional religious altars. The sacristan of the church, Hamí, and other traditionalist leaders actively put up physical resistance to defend the sacred structures. By late 1879, the religious and political rift became completely irreconcilable. Refusing to abandon their ancestral customs under the new leadership, a substantial population of traditionalists permanently migrated away from the main village of Old Laguna. A portion of these refugees moved west to seek asylum at Isleta Pueblo, while the remaining traditionalist faction moved north to establish the new, isolated outlying village of Mesita, permanently reshaping the geopolitical footprint of the Pueblo land.

=== 1880 Railroad Construction and Hydrological Transformation ===
In 1880, the Atlantic and Pacific Railroad laid tracks along an east–west trajectory through the Rio San Jose valley, an infrastructure expansion that fundamentally altered local hydrology and ultimately led to the desiccation of the historic lake from which the Laguna Pueblo derived its name. The physical footprint of the rail line, combined with rapid upstream overgrazing and timber harvesting during this period, triggered severe soil erosion along the watershed. The resulting siltation filled the reservoir bed, permanently converting the ancient agricultural lake into dry meadowlands.

During the early-to-mid 20th century, federal agencies, including the U.S. Department of Agriculture, intentionally introduced and widely planted non-native tamarisk trees (commonly known as saltcedar) along New Mexico waterways to combat widespread watershed erosion and stabilize vulnerable riverbanks. The plant quickly escalated into an aggressive invasive species throughout the region, heavily colonizing the Rio San Jose basin and the surrounding Pueblo lands.

Characterized by remarkably high evapotranspiration rates, mature tamarisk thickets consumed vast amounts of water daily, siphoning moisture directly from underground aquifers and severely depressing the local water table. Furthermore, the tree's deep root networks actively drew up underground alkaline water, excreting highly concentrated salt crystals from glands on its leaves. Upon falling, the foliage blanketed the ground in salt, elevating surface soil salinity to toxic levels that choked out native cottonwoods and willows, which fundamentally altered the riparian ecology of the Pueblo.

=== The Richmond, California, boxcar colony (1922–1982) ===
Following the 1880 right-of-way agreement between the Atlantic and Pacific Railroad and the Pueblo of Laguna—historically referred to as the "Flower of Friendship"—the railroad guaranteed permanent employment to tribal members. This agreement laid the foundation for long-distance labor migrations, culminating in the establishment of a permanent diaspora community at the Atchison, Topeka and Santa Fe (AT&SF) Railway terminal in Richmond, California. In response to the national Shopmen's Strike of 1922, AT&SF management mobilized the treaty agreement, recruiting Laguna men to relocate to the Richmond rail yards as replacement mechanics, laborers, and track workers.

To accommodate the workers and their families, the railway company provided housing consisting of retired wooden and steel freight boxcars parked along the dead ends of the terminal's track sidings. The railroad modified these boxcars into family living units complete with running water, sinks, showers, and wood-burning stoves. Known locally as the Richmond "Indian Village" or "Boxcar Village", the settlement grew into a formalized satellite community of the Pueblo. Rather than assimilating into the surrounding urban San Francisco Bay Area, the residents petitioning the Laguna tribal government for recognition and were formally designated as an official, self-governing "Colony of the Laguna Pueblo in New Mexico". The colony operated under a local governor appointed by the home Pueblo, collected tribal taxes, and functioned as an extension of traditional sovereignty.

The boxcar community maintained strict cultural persistence and tight ties with the home Pueblo for over sixty years. Residents cultivated community vegetable gardens, spoke the Keresan language, and routinely traveled back to New Mexico via the Santa Fe lines to participate in sacred ceremonies and annual Feast Days. They also replicated cultural traditions directly within the California rail yards, notably celebrating "Grab Day" by throwing candies and gifts from the boxcar roofs to the village children. The Richmond boxcar colony persisted through the post–World War II industrial expansion until it was officially disbanded in the mid-1980s as rail yard operations modernized and the last families relocated. The oral histories and material culture of the village are preserved within UC Berkeley's Bancroft Library archives.

=== Uranium Mining and the Jackpile-Paguate Superfund Site ===
In 1953, the Anaconda Minerals Company (a subsidiary of the Atlantic Richfield Company) began operating the Jackpile-Paguate Mine on tribal lease lands adjacent to the village of Paguate. Over its 29-year operation until its closure in 1982, the facility grew into the largest open-pit uranium mine in the world, stripping roughly 2,656 acres of land and extracting approximately 25 million tons of uranium ore. The mine's footprint was located mere hundreds of feet from residential areas and intersected local waterways, including the Rio Paguate and Rio Moquino.

The intensive open-pit operations upended the Pueblo's traditional socio-economic structures and left an extensive ecological and public health burden. Mining activities generated massive quantities of radioactive dust and left behind over 23 million tons of sub-grade ore and toxic tailings dumps. Runoff from these waste piles contaminated downstream surface waters and the Paguate Reservoir wetland with heavy metals and radionuclides, including uranium isotopes (U-234, U-235, U-238) and manganese.

Decades after mining ceased, former workers and residents in downwind communities continue to experience elevated rates of kidney disease, hypertension, and various cancers linked to persistent radiation exposure and heavy metal toxicity. Due to the failure of early reclamation efforts to halt ongoing groundwater and atmospheric contamination, the U.S. Environmental Protection Agency officially added the Jackpile-Paguate Mine to the National Priorities List as a Superfund site in December 2013 to initiate comprehensive federal remediation.

The migratory plume of uranium and heavy metal runoff from the Jackpile mine significantly impacted downstream infrastructure, leading to the contamination and eventual irrigation closure of the Mesita Dam reservoir, located near the village of Mesita. Extensive sampling by the EPA confirmed severe radiation hotspots, accumulation of uranium-laden sediment, and "Level II" environmental contamination across the reservoir basin, making the water completely unsafe to supply local farms. This hydrological pollution severely affected the local wildlife and riparian ecology; the reservoir and the connecting Rio Paguate river system historically served as active habitats for native fish populations, such as catfish, bluegill, and crappie, which became high-risk vectors for bioaccumulated heavy metal toxicity. The toxic sediments trapped within the marshy, tamarisk-lined dam area continue to compromise the surrounding food chain and local ecosystems, disrupting both historical wildlife nesting and traditional tribal fishing practices.

=== Off-reservation sovereign immunity and property expansion ===
The Pueblo significantly advanced the boundaries of tribal legal autonomy in the 2011 precedent-setting case Armijo v. Pueblo of Laguna (2011-NMCA-006) before the New Mexico Court of Appeals. The litigation arose from a boundary dispute after the Pueblo purchased 8,300 acres of commercial "fee land" in the Mount Taylor foothills outside its official reservation boundaries. The court affirmed that the Pueblo's inherent tribal sovereign immunity completely bars private lawsuits regarding land ownership, extending legal immunity protections to commercial open-market land purchases that have not yet been placed into federal trust by the Department of the Interior.

== Geography ==
Location of the Laguna Pueblo

Their reservation lies in parts of four counties: In descending order of included land area they are Cibola, Sandoval, Valencia and Bernalillo Counties. It includes the six villages of Encinal, Laguna, Mesita, Paguate, Paraje, and Seama. The reservation is 45 miles (72 km) west of the city of Albuquerque. The reservation consists of approximately 500,000 acres (2,000 km^{2}).

The Laguna Pueblo (and the Acoma Pueblo) lie in the river basin of the Rio San Jose. The laguna or lake was historically much larger than the present time and hosted waterfowl of many kinds, including ducks, geese and swans. The Rio San Jose flows into the Rio Puerco near the southeast corner of the Laguna Reservation.

=== Communities ===
- Encinal
- Laguna
- New Laguna, New Mexico
- Mesita
- Paguate
- Paraje
- Seama
- Casa Blanca, New Mexico

=== San José de la Laguna Mission Art and Altar Screen ===
Constructed between 1699 and 1701, the Mission San José de la Laguna (St. Joseph Church) is renowned for its well-preserved interior artwork, which represents a unique synthesis of Spanish colonial Catholicism and traditional Keresan iconography. The sanctuary walls feature original earthen plaster murals painted with geometric, abstract Pueblo motifs utilizing hand-ground red, yellow, and black native mineral pigments. The ceiling structure of the nave consists of massive exposed pine round-timber vigas topped with closely laid peeled-pole latillas arranged in a tight herringbone pattern, accented with soft earth colors.

The focal point of the mission interior is the historic hide-and-wood reredos (altar screen) positioned within the main sanctuary, widely considered by art historians to be the finest flowering of the late Spanish colonial New Mexican santero folk art style. The screen was created between 1800 and 1808 by an anonymous, itinerant master folk artist known in art history texts simply as "The Laguna Santero", whose stylistic work here influenced colonial religious art across Northern New Mexico. The altar screen features painted portraits of Saint Joseph at the center, flanked by Saint Barbara and Saint John Nepomuk. Directly above the altar screen, the ceiling of the sanctuary is adorned with distinct Pueblo celestial symbols depicting a rainbow alongside representations of the sun, moon, and stars, illustrating the deep historical syncretism between Franciscan religious narratives and traditional Pueblo cosmological oral histories.

== Government ==
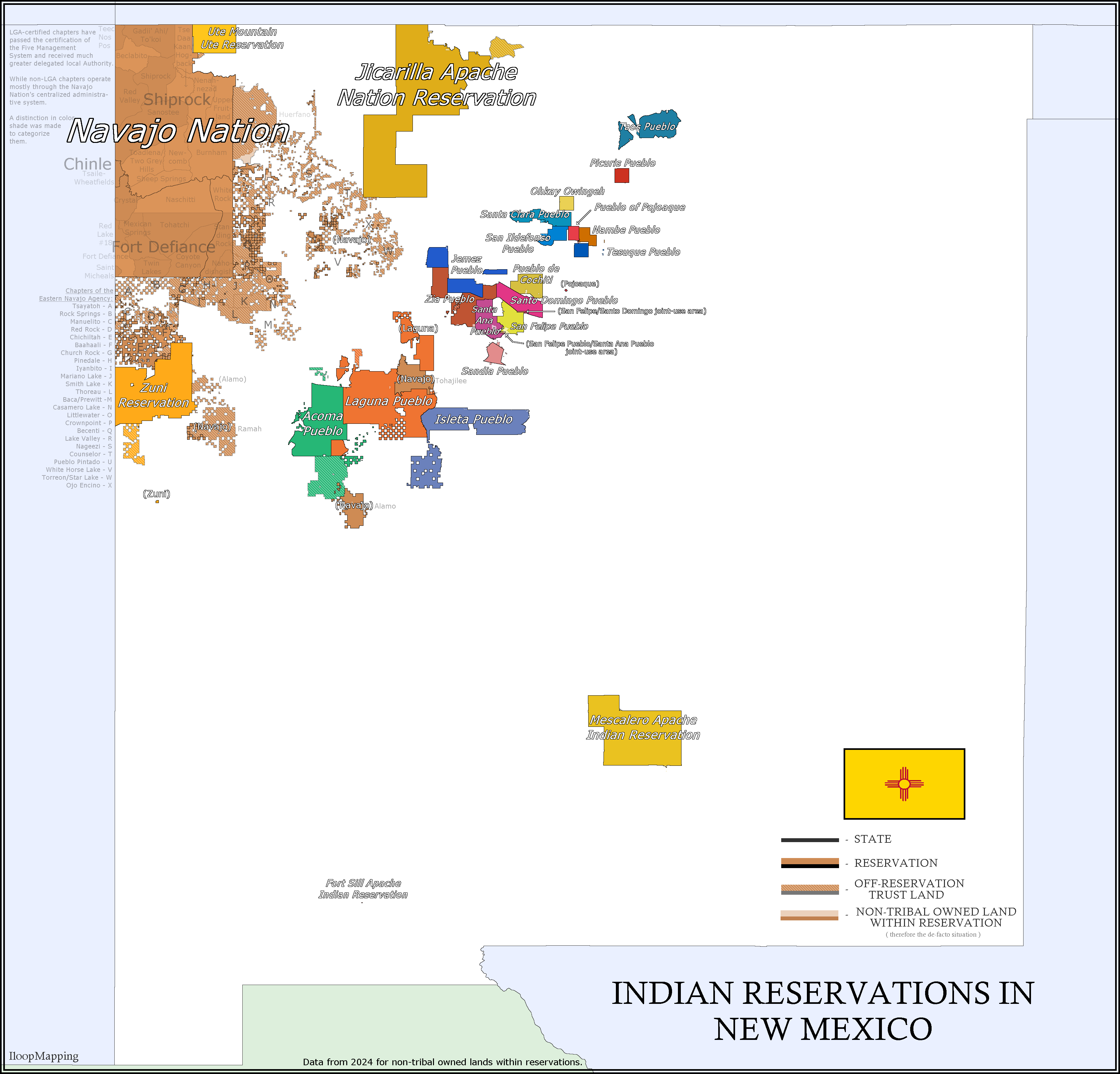
Map of the Laguna and neighboring tribes (In orange)

The administration of the Pueblo of Laguna in 2025 is:

- Governor: Harry Antonio Jr.
- First Lieutenant Governor: Ronald Sarracino Jr.
- Second Lieutenant Governor: Wilfred Herrera Jr.

== Culture ==
The people of Laguna have a long history of residing in and farming along the Rio San José in west-central New Mexico. Laguna history begins long before the advent of written records in the Southwest. It is a common misconception that the Pueblo of Laguna began in 1699, at the time of the construction of the Mission. However, research of 1,449 archaeological sites and an anthropological analysis of the Laguna oral history have firmly proven that people have inhabited the area ranging from 6500 BCE to the present.

The Acoma Pueblo and Pueblo of Laguna have many ties, including location, language and a shared high school.

The Pueblo of Laguna has a well-established Tribal Law system. The Pueblo of Laguna has participated as a "Weed and Seed" tribe. This Department of Justice program studied the enforcement of law and effectiveness of social programs on Native American lands.

The Irish surname Riley was adopted by many members of the Laguna tribe in the 1800s, for legal use in European-American culture, while they retained their Laguna names for tribal use.

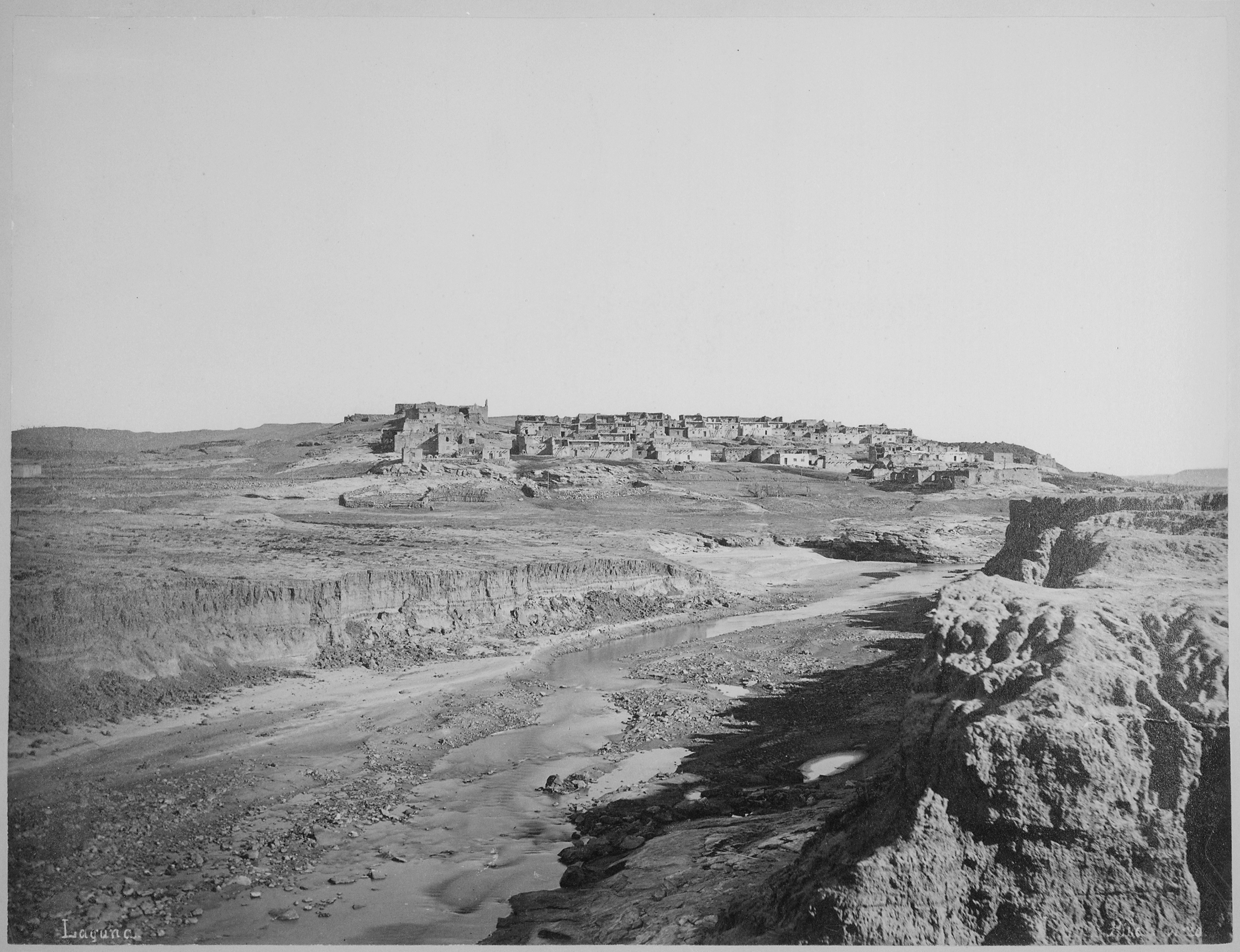
Laguna Pueblo, 1879

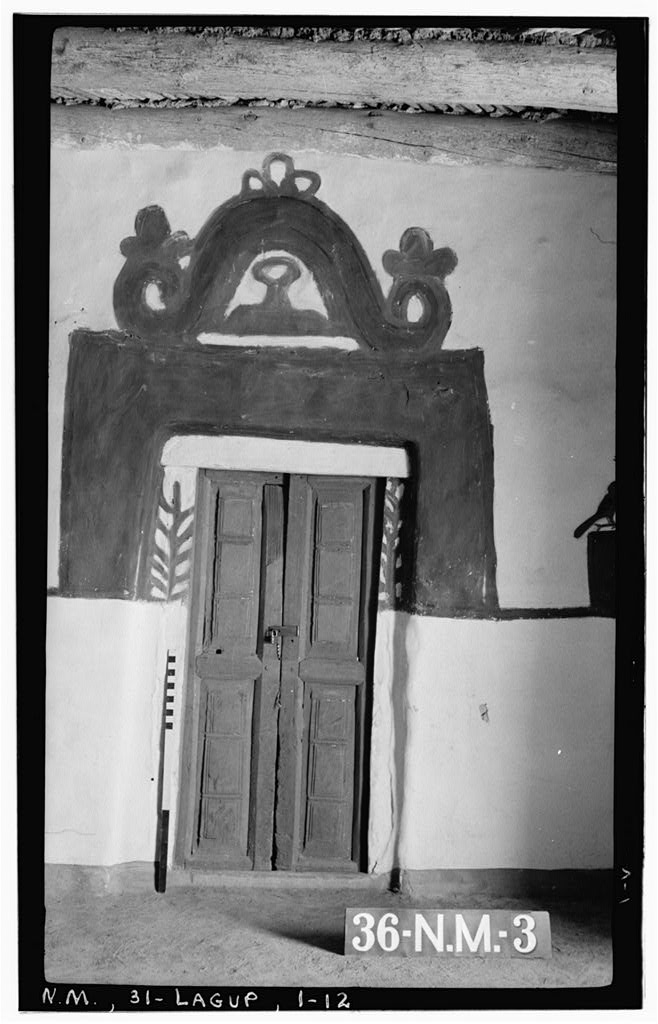
Door to Baptistry, Laguna Mission, 1934

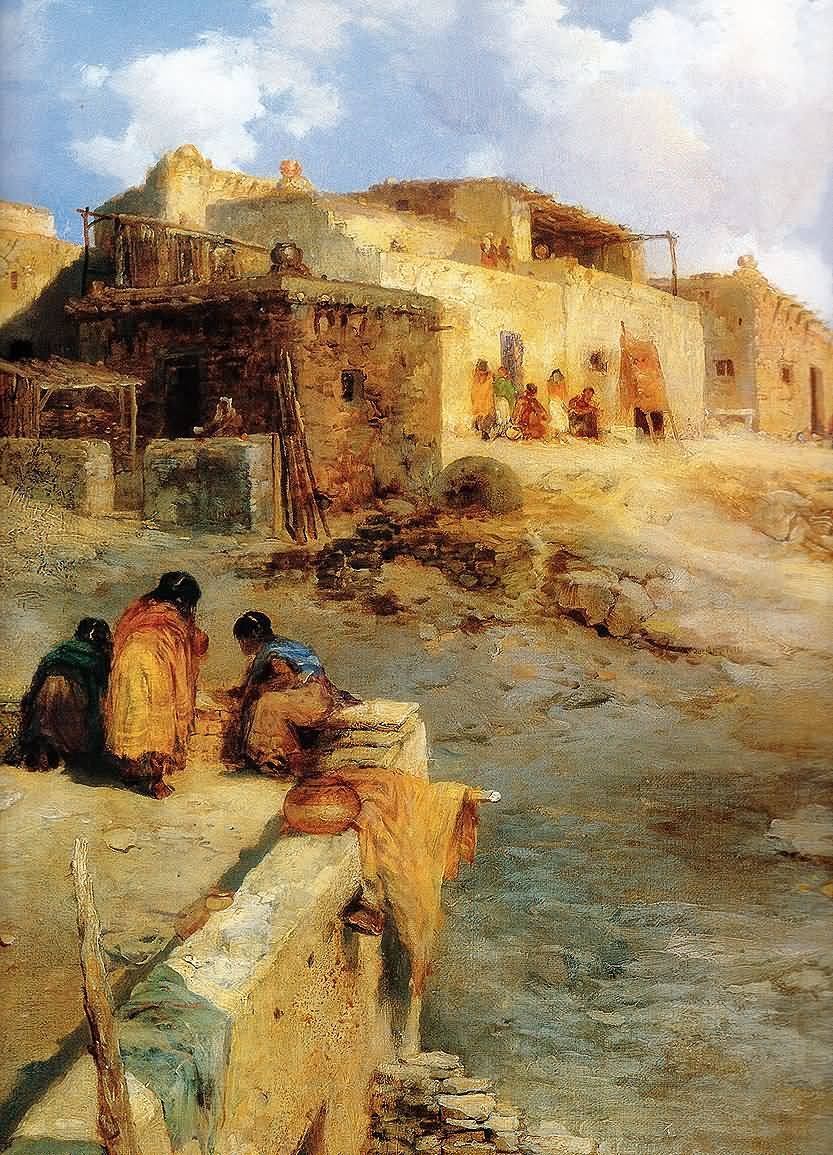
An Indian Pueblo Laguna New Mexico, by Thomas Moran

=== Language ===
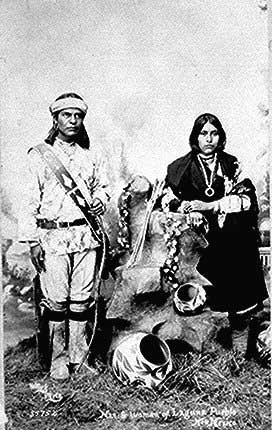
Laguna man and woman in traditional clothing

Lagunas traditionally speak the Western variety of Keresan. Most Laguna elders do not speak English.

=== 20th-century pottery decline and the Cheromiah revival ===
By the mid-20th century, the traditional art of hand-coiled ceramic production at Laguna Pueblo had nearly reached extinction, driven by economic transitions toward railroad wage labor and local uranium mining, which reduced the domestic and commercial necessity of the craft. During this period, Laguna residents predominantly relied on commercial goods or purchased utilitarian pottery from neighboring Acoma Pueblo.

In the 1970s, master potter Evelyn Cheromiah (1928–2013), a member of the Roadrunner Clan, initiated a major cultural movement to resurrect authentic Laguna ceramic techniques. Collaborating with art advocate Nancy Winslow, Cheromiah secured a federal grant to establish and teach comprehensive pottery fabrication courses at the Laguna Pueblo Community Center. As one of the last active traditional potters on the Pueblo, Cheromiah meticulously studied historic ancestral potsherds to identify indigenous clay sources, revive the use of natural mineral and vegetal pigments, and re-introduce the complex outdoor pit-firing method. Her vessels are characterized by stark white slips adorned with highly precise, geometric polychrome patterns, interlocking fine lines, and traditional cloud or animal motifs.

Cheromiah's work earned numerous honors at the Santa Fe Indian Market, the Gallup Inter-Tribal Indian Ceremonial, and the New Mexico State Fair, which established her as a pivotal figure in Southwestern art history. Her hand-coiled pieces entered prominent national collections, with notable acquisitions by figures such as First Lady Nancy Reagan and New Mexico television broadcaster Steve Stucker, as well as major institutional displays including the permanent collections of the Albuquerque Museum. Most contemporary Laguna potters trace their artistic lineage directly to her instruction, a legacy she cemented by passing ancestral techniques down to her daughters—Lee Ann Cheromiah, Mary Cheromiah-Victorino, and Wendy Cheromiah—and her grandchildren.

== Education ==
Primary and middle school education is provided by the Laguna Department of Education, which also operates Early Childhood program and adult education programs. The high school is shared with nearby Acoma Pueblo. Lagunas value intellectual activity and education, so a scholarship program has led to many well-educated Lagunas. Uranium mining on Pueblo of Laguna land has contributed to this scholarship program as well as to skilled labor learning among Laguna members. Lagunas and other Pueblos enjoy baseball. Like many Pueblos, the Laguna people are skilled in pottery.

== Economy ==
The Laguna Development Corporation; founded in 1998, is a wholly owned subsidiary of the Pueblo of Laguna. Laguna Development is a federally chartered tribal corporation formed under Section 17 of the 1934 Indian Reorganization Act.

The company develops and operates the tribe's retail-based outlets, including two travel centers, a supermarket, a convenience store, an RV park, an arcade, a Superette and three casinos on the Pueblo of Laguna reservation that spans Cibola, Bernalillo, Valencia and Sandoval counties.

Laguna Construction Company, a construction company owned by the Pueblo of Laguna, was one of the largest U.S. contractors in Iraq, with reconstruction contracts worth more than $300 million since 2004. In addition to its headquarters at the pueblo, Laguna Industries, Inc. maintains offices in Albuquerque, New Mexico; San Antonio and Houston, Texas; Baghdad, Iraq, and Amman, Jordan. In 2007, Laguna Construction employed 75 people, most of whom belong to the pueblo.

Several Laguna Pueblo businesses are along tourist and truck route corridors that attract New Mexico tourists, long- and short-haul truck drivers, and residents of nearby Albuquerque. Other Laguna Development businesses provide basic services to local tribal communities.

== Demographics ==
On the 2010 census 6,758 people in the U.S. reported being exclusively Laguna and 8,358 people reported being Laguna either exclusively or in combination with another group.

The State of New Mexico says the population is 7,700.

== Notable people ==
- Deb Haaland (born 1960), American politician and enrolled member of the Pueblo of Laguna who won the 2026 New Mexico gubernatorial election, making her the first Native American woman elected governor. She previously served as the 54th United States Secretary of the Interior (2021–2025), making her the first Native American to lead a cabinet-level agency.
- Larry Bird (born 1941), painter and filmmaker
- Frank Hudson (1875–1950), football player and coach
- Michael Kanteena, potter
- Lee Marmon (1925–2021), photographer
- Josephine Waconda (1935–2013), first Native American commissioned as a rear admiral in the United States Public Health Service Commissioned Corps

=== Non-enrolled descendants ===
- Paula Gunn Allen (1939–2008), author, novelist, and scholar
- Leslie Marmon Silko (born 1948), author, educator, and filmmaker

== See also ==
- Anaconda, New Mexico
- Anton Docher "The Padre of Isleta"
- National Register of Historic Places listings in Cibola County, New Mexico
