= San Estévan del Rey Mission Church =

Historic church in New Mexico, United States

- U.S. National Register of Historic Places
- U.S. National Historic Landmark
- U.S. National Historic Landmark District – Contributing property
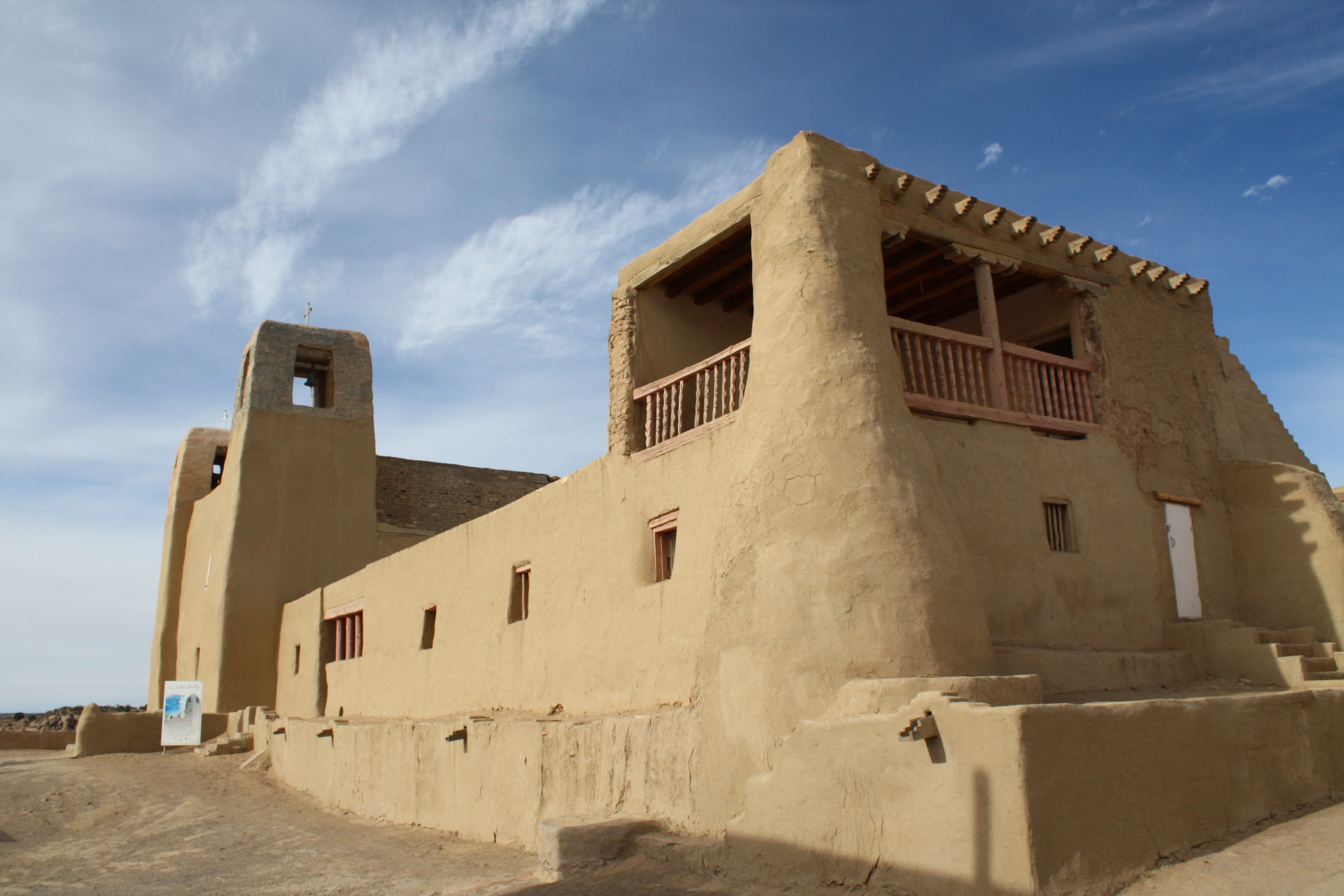
- San Estévan del Rey Mission in 2009

- Location within New Mexico Location within the United States
- Location: Acoma Pueblo, Acoma, New Mexico
- Coordinates: 34°53′42″N 107°34′57″W
- Area: 45 acres (18 ha)
- Built: 1629–1641
- Architectural style: Colonial, Spanish Colonial
- Part of: Acoma Pueblo (ID66000500)
- NRHP reference No.: 70000417

Significant dates
- Added to NRHP: April 15, 1970
- Designated NHL: April 15, 1970
- Designated NHLDCP: October 9, 1960

San Estévan del Rey Mission Church is a Spanish mission church in the Roman Catholic Diocese of Gallup on the Acoma Pueblo Reservation in western New Mexico. Built between 1629 and 1641, it is one of the finest extant examples of hybrid Spanish Colonial and Puebloan architectural styles. It was named for Saint Stephen I of Hungary. The church was declared a National Historic Landmark in 1970, and is listed on the National Register of Historic Places. It remains a mission church and is part of the parish of San José de la Laguna in Laguna, New Mexico.

== Description ==
The San Estévan del Rey Mission Church stands at the northern end of the large plaza that takes up the southern end of the mesa top that houses Sky City, the traditional Acoma pueblo settlement that has been continuously occupied since prehistoric times. It is a large adobe structure, built in a wall and beam construction style. Its main walls are thick at the base, one measuring 7 feet (2.1 m) in thickness, and rise to a height of 35 feet (11 m) and a thickness of over 2 feet (0.61 m). The roof masonry, about six inches of adobe weighing several tons, is supported by large ponderosa pine vigas over which roughly-hewn wooden planks are laid. The interior is finished in gypsum, with an original native painting on the back wall of the sanctuary. Adjacent to the church is a small single-story convento, which served as the domicile for the priest. The mission also had other buildings, but these are in ruins. Adjacent to the church is a cemetery surrounded by a low wall with openings facing west, providing an opportunity for ancestors to return to find rest. The maintenance of the church traditionally falls to the Gaugashti, Acoma men designated “the church caretakers”, along with Pueblo of Acoma Historic Preservation Office.

== History ==
Spanish colonial explorers came to Acoma in 1540. Spanish colonial authorities took authority over Acoma by force of arms in the 1599 Acoma massacre, making it part of the province of Santa Fe de Nuevo México. In 1629 Father Juan Ramírez began construction of the mission, using enslaved Acoma and craftsmen. Materials for the construction were hauled up the steep trails on the sides of the mesa, and the viga beams were transported some 40 miles (64 km) from Mount Taylor, the nearest source for such timbers. During the 1680 Pueblo Revolt, the Acoma killed the local priest, but the church survived the uprising, and the Spanish return to power in 1692. The church has undergone relatively minor repairs, in 1799–1800, 1903, and 1924.

== See also ==
- Spanish missions in New Mexico
- National Register of Historic Places listings in Cibola County, New Mexico
- List of National Historic Landmarks in New Mexico
