= Village of Encinal Day School =

- U.S. National Register of Historic Places
- Location within New Mexico
- Location: NW of Encinal, Encinal, New Mexico
- Coordinates: 35°07′14″N 107°27′48″W
- Area: 0.7 acres (0.28 ha)
- Built: 1926
- Built by: US Government
- Architectural style: Mission Revival
- NRHP reference No.: 80002576
- Added to NRHP: August 8, 1980

The Village of Encinal Day School, near Encinal, New Mexico, was built in 1926. It was listed on the National Register of Historic Places in 1980. The listing included four contributing buildings.

The building served children of the Laguna Pueblo tribe.

The school building is a one-story adobe building with a 62 by 40 feet (19 m × 12 m) plan, and ceilings 11 feet (3.4 m) high. It is Mission Revival in style.

It is located northwest of Encinal.
