= Candelaria Pueblo =

- U.S. National Register of Historic Places
- NM State Register of Cultural Properties
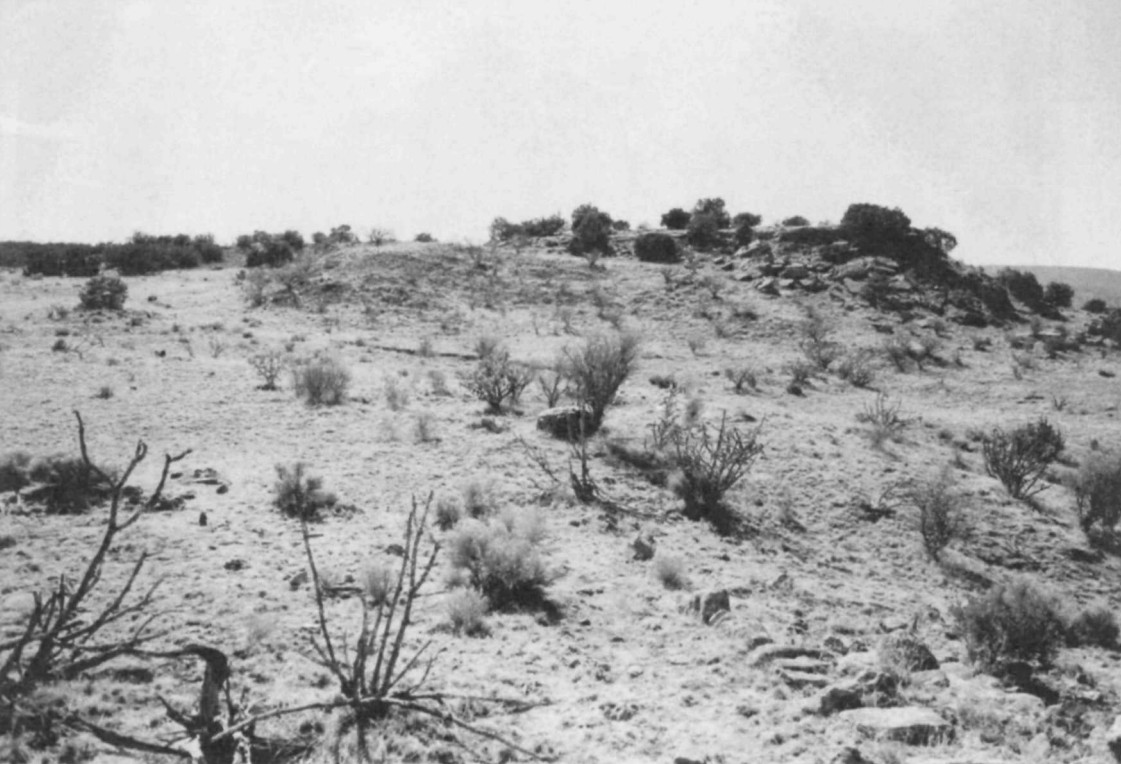
- c. 2005 of backfilled great kiva site
- Nearest city: Grants, New Mexico
- Area: 33.2 acres (13.4 ha)
- NRHP reference No.: 83001619
- NMSRCP No.: 847

Significant dates
- Added to NRHP: March 10, 1983
- Designated NMSRCP: December 18, 1981

Candelaria Pueblo, also known as Las Ventanas, is a Chacoan-style site located within the El Malpais National Monument. The site consists of a two-story great house with approximately 75-90 rooms. Built circa 1050-1100 A.D., the pueblo served as a house of worship and was surrounded by a community of smaller pueblos. A lava flow to the west of the great house preserved many of the ritual sites and artifacts associated with the pueblo.

Archaeological investigations at the site began in the 1980s and are still ongoing. The pueblo was added to the National Register of Historic Places in 1983.

== See also ==
- National Register of Historic Places listings in Cibola County, New Mexico
