= Larry Littlebird =

Santo Domingo-Laguna painter and filmmaker (1941–2025)

- Born: Lawrence A. Bird; June 6, 1941
- Died: September 15, 2025 (aged 84)
- Citizenship: Kewa Pueblo, Laguna Pueblo, American

Lawrence A. Bird or Larry Littlebird (June 6, 1941 – September 15, 2025) was an American Kewa Pueblo/Laguna Pueblo painter, filmmaker, actor and writer from Santo Domingo, New Mexico. He utilized ink and tempera in his works, which often display a loose, abstracted style. Littlebird exhibited his artwork across the country and had works in the public collections of several institutions including the Smithsonian National Museum of the American Indian.

Littlebird first attended the Institute of American Indian Arts (IAIA) for design in 1963. He worked for a time at the Museum of New Mexico and was the recipient of an Interior Design (magazine) Award for Painting. In 1971, a critic called Littlebird's painting "Son Returning Home" "one of the finest combinations of contemporary art and Indian heritage," saying the painting displayed "great grace and power."

Littlebird returned to the IAIA in the 1980s as an instructor. He later began working in the performing arts as a filmmaker, producer, writer and actor, and was one of the first Native American artists to create films about Native people.
