= Spanish missions in New Mexico =

16th to 19th-century Catholic religious outposts

The Spanish Missions in New Mexico were a series of religious outposts in the Province of Santa Fe de Nuevo México - present day New Mexico. They were established by Franciscan friars under charter from the monarchs of the Spanish Empire and the government of the Viceroyalty of New Spain in a policy called Reductions to facilitate the conversion of Native Americans into Christianity.

== History ==
They attempted to Hispanicize the indigenous peoples. The affected included the rich cultures and tribes of: many of the 21 distinct Puebloan groups; the Tiwa; the Navajo; and the Apache. The missions also aimed to pacify resistance to the European invasion of the tribes' Pre-Columbian homelands and loss of traditions. The missions introduced European livestock, fruits, vegetables, and small-scale industry into the Southwest region. They also introduced European diseases to which native people had little or no acquired immunity.

Fray Marcos de Niza, sent by Coronado, first saw the area now known as New Mexico in 1539. The first permanent settlement was Mission San Gabriel, founded in 1598 by Juan de Oñate near what is now known as Okay Owingeh, formerly known as the San Juan Pueblo.

== Missions ==
Name	Image	Location	Established	Notes	References
Nuestra Señora de los Ángeles de Porciúncula		35.54999, -105.68916	1598	Original church was used only briefly and abandoned. Reestablished in 1616 with a new church completed after 1629. Destroyed in 1680, rebuilt c. 1696, rebuilt again c. 1717. Abandoned in 1838. Ruins are part of Pecos National Historical Park.	
Nuestra Señora de la Asunción de Zía		35.50651, -106.72185	After or in July 1598	Established as San Pedro y San Pablo. Damaged in 1680 and rededicated in 1692 as Nuestra Señora de la Asunción. Church built c. 1700.	
San Juan Bautista de los Caballeros		36.05417, -106.07169	September 8, 1598	Destroyed in 1680, rebuilt c. 1706. Replaced with a new Gothic-style church in 1913.	
San José de los Jémez		35.7785, -106.6866	c. 1600	Church completed between 1625 and 1628, abandoned c. 1630. Ruins are now part of Jemez Historic Site.	
San Felipe		35.43317, -106.44667	1605	Destroyed in 1680, rebuilt on a new site in 1706. Remodeled c. 1801.	
Santo Domingo		35.5134, -106.36192	1607	Destroyed in 1680, rebuilt in 1706. A second church was added in the mid-18th century. Both were destroyed in a flood of the Rio Grande in 1886. The current church was built in 1895 at a new location.	
Nuestra Señora de Dolores y de San Antonio de Sandía		35.25413, -106.57088	c. 1610	Established as San Francisco de Sandía. Destroyed and pueblo abandoned in 1680. Reestablished in 1748 as Nuestra Señora de Dolores y de San Antonio. Second church completed in 1752 and collapsed in the 1770s. Third church built c. 1784 and fell to ruins by the 1860s. Current church built on new site in 1864 and remodeled most recently in 1976.	
Nuestra Señora de los Remedios de Galisteo		35.39537, -105.947	c. 1610	Abandoned in 1680, reestablished in 1706 by Francisco Cuervo y Valdés, abandoned again in the 1780s. The current church is a reconstruction from 1884.	
San Marcos		Pueblo San Marcos, Galisteo Basin	c. 1610	Abandoned in 1680.	
San Miguel		35.6835, -105.93769	c. 1610	Built c. 1610, partly destroyed in 1680, rebuilt 1710.	
San Agustín de la Isleta		34.90897, -106.69333	c. 1612	Church built between 1613 and 1617. Remodeled in 1910–1923 and again in 1962.	
San Francisco de Nambé		Nambé Pueblo	1613	Church built c. 1617, destroyed in 1680, rebuilt 1725. Remodeled c. 1900 with a pitched roof which caused it to collapse around 1908. Third church built in 1910 and demolished in 1960. Current church built 1975.	
San Jerónimo de Taos		36.43907, -105.54668 (ruins of old church), 36.43848, -105.54599 (current church)	1617	Church built c. 1626. Destroyed in 1680, rebuilt c. 1706. Destroyed during the Taos Revolt in 1847. Current church built c. 1850 on a different site. Ruins of old church still exist.	
San Ildefonso		35.89355, -106.11984	c. 1617	Destroyed in 1680, rebuilt in 1711 on new site. Remodeled in 1905 and rebuilt in 1968.	
San Lorenzo de Picurís		36.20067, -105.70951	c. 1620	Destroyed in 1680, rebuilt 1706, rebuilt again in the 1740s. Destroyed again in 1769 and rebuilt c. 1776. Remodeled c. 1900 and again in the 1960s.	
San Gregorio de Abó		34.45035, -106.37549	1622	Built 1629–1644, abandoned by 1678. Ruins are part of Salinas Pueblo Missions National Monument.	
San Estévan del Rey de Ácoma		34.89529, -107.5825	1623	Church completed c. 1630. Damaged in 1680 and rebuilt in 1696–1700.	
Nuestra Señora de Perpetuo Socorro		34.06042, -106.89376	1626	Destroyed in 1680. The present-day San Miguel Church was built on the same site in 1816–1821.	
San Antonio de Padua de Senecú		Near Socorro	1626	Pueblo and mission were abandoned in 1675.	
Nuestra Señora de Purísima Concepción de Quarai		34.59609, -106.29599	1627	Built 1627–1633, abandoned by 1677. Ruins are part of Salinas Pueblo Missions National Monument.	
San Luis Obispo de Sevilleta		Near Socorro	1627	Later downgraded to a visita of Socorro. Abandoned in 1680.	
La Purísima Concepcíón de Hawikuh		34.93222, -108.98455	1628	Destroyed in 1680.	
Santa Clara	Santa_Clara_Pueblos_-_NARA_-_523835	35.97111, -106.08917	1628	New church was built in 1758, but collapsed in 1909. Current building was constructed in 1918.	
Nuestra Señora de Guadalupe de Zuñi		35.06776, -108.84961	1629	Damaged in 1680, rebuilt c. 1692.	
San Ysidro and San Buenaventura de Humanas (Gran Quivira)		34.25962, -106.09232	c. 1629	San Buenaventura originally served San Gregorio de Abó. San Ysidro chapel built c. 1629–1632, San Buenaventura built c. 1660s. Ruins are part of Salinas Pueblo Missions National Monument.	
San Diego de Tesuque		Tesuque Pueblo	late 1620s	Established as San Lorenzo. Destroyed in 1680, reestablished as San Diego in 1695. Church rebuilt c. 1706. Remodeled c. 1914.	
San Buenaventura de Cochití		35.60813, -106.34589	c. 1630	Destroyed in 1680, rebuilt c. 1706. Remodeled c. 1900 and in the 1960s.	
Santa Ana		Santa Ana Pueblo	c. 1693	Church built c. 1700. Current, larger church built 1734–1750.	
San José de Laguna		35.03468, -107.38845	c. 1700	Still in use.	
San Francisco de Asís		36.35845, -105.60837	c. 1815	Church built between 1772 and 1816 and is located in the historic district of Ranchos de Taos.	

== Noted churches that were not missions ==
- El Santuario de Chimayó - Site of an Easter pilgrimage by foot to this holy spot every year. Not a mission; founded c.1810 as a private chapel.
- Santuario de Nuestra Señora de Guadalupe - Founded c. 1777; believed to be nation's oldest shrine dedicated to Our Lady of Guadalupe. Not a mission.

== See also ==
On Spanish Missions in neighboring regions:

- Spanish missions in Arizona
- Spanish missions in California
- Spanish missions in Chihuahua and Coahuila
- Spanish missions in Texas
- Spanish missions in the Sonoran Desert (including Sonora and southern Arizona)

On general missionary history:

- Catholic Church and the Age of Discovery
- List of the oldest churches in Mexico

On colonial Spanish American history:

- Spanish colonization of the Americas
- California mission clash of cultures
- Genízaros
