= Paraje, New Mexico =

- Census-designated place
- Location of Paraje, New Mexico

- Location in the United States
- Coordinates: 35°02′40″N 107°28′05″W
- Country: United States
- State: New Mexico
- County: Cibola

Area
  - Total: 5.58 sq mi (14.44 km^{2})
  - Land: 5.58 sq mi (14.44 km^{2})
  - Water: 0 sq mi (0.00 km^{2})
- Elevation: 5,912 ft (1,802 m)

Population (2020)
  - Total: 705
  - Density: 126.4/sq mi (48.82/km^{2})
- Time zone: UTC-7 (Mountain (MST))
  - Summer (DST): UTC-6 (MDT)
- ZIP code: 87007
- Area code: 505
- FIPS code: 35-55340
- GNIS feature ID: 2409025

Paraje is a census-designated place (CDP) in Cibola County, New Mexico, United States. As of the 2020 census, Paraje had a population of 705.

== Geography ==
Paraje is located in northeastern Cibola County within the lands of Laguna Pueblo. The Paraje CDP includes the community of Casa Blanca. The CDP is bordered to the west by Seama and to the east by Laguna. Old U.S. Route 66 passes through the community, following the valley of the Rio San Jose, an east-flowing tributary of the Rio Puerco. Interstate 40 passes through the southern edge of Paraje, with access from Exit 108, Casa Blanca Road. Grants, the Cibola County seat, is 25 miles (40 km) to the west, and Albuquerque is 53 miles (85 km) to the east.

According to the United States Census Bureau, the Paraje CDP has a total area of 5.6 square miles (14.4 km^{2}), all land.

== Demographics ==
Historical population
Census	Pop.	Note	%±
2020	705		—
U.S. Decennial Census

As of the census of 2000, there were 669 people, 194 households, and 163 families residing in the CDP. The population density was 148.6 inhabitants per square mile (57.4/km^{2}). There were 228 housing units at an average density of 50.6 per square mile (19.5/km^{2}). The racial makeup of the CDP was 4.33% White, 0.30% African American, 91.93% Native American, 0.75% from other races, and 2.69% from two or more races. Hispanic or Latino of any race were 4.33% of the population.

There were 194 households, out of which 39.7% had children under the age of 18 living with them, 44.3% were married couples living together, 33.0% had a female householder with no husband present, and 15.5% were non-families. 13.9% of all households were made up of individuals, and 4.6% had someone living alone who was 65 years of age or older. The average household size was 3.45 and the average family size was 3.75.

In the CDP, the population was spread out, with 35.1% under the age of 18, 11.2% from 18 to 24, 28.0% from 25 to 44, 16.0% from 45 to 64, and 9.7% who were 65 years of age or older. The median age was 28 years. For every 100 females, there were 91.1 males. For every 100 females age 18 and over, there were 77.1 males.

The median income for a household in the CDP was $25,179, and the median income for a family was $24,375. Males had a median income of $20,536 versus $16,522 for females. The per capita income for the CDP was $7,350. About 37.3% of families and 39.3% of the population were below the poverty line, including 47.7% of those under age 18 and 32.5% of those age 65 or over.

== Education ==
All public schools in the county are operated by Grants/Cibola County Schools.
