= Acoma Curio Shop =

- U.S. National Register of Historic Places
- NM State Register of Cultural Properties
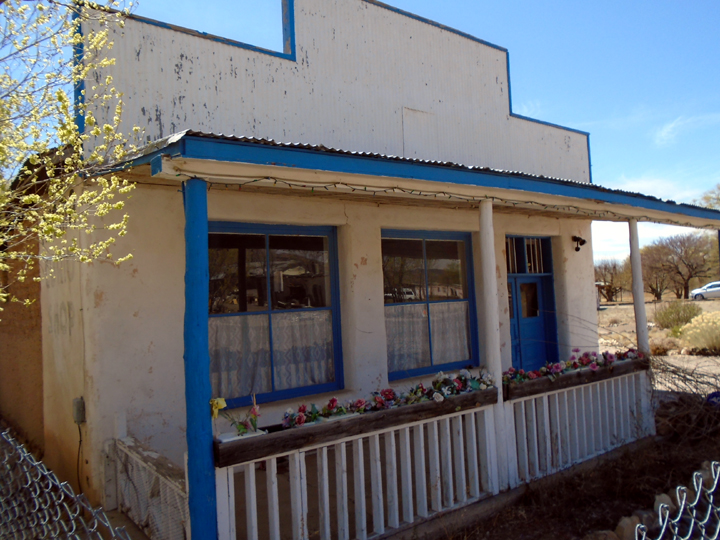
- Acoma Curio Shop in San Fidel, New Mexico

- Location within New Mexico Location within the United States
- Location: 1090 NM 124, San Fidel, New Mexico
- Coordinates: 35°5′2″N 107°35′50″W
- Area: less than one acre
- Built: 1937
- MPS: Route 66 through New Mexico MPS
- NRHP reference No.: 09000817
- NMSRCP No.: 1934

Significant dates
- Added to NRHP: October 7, 2009
- Designated NMSRCP: December 12, 2008

The Acoma Curio Shop is a former souvenir shop located on historic U.S. Route 66 in San Fidel, New Mexico. The store built in 1916 by Abdoo Fidel, a Lebanese immigrant, and was originally a general store. In 1937, Fidel began to sell Native American curios to tourists passing through San Fidel on Route 66. Fidel's shop only sold curios crafted at the Acoma Pueblo, unlike most souvenir shops at the time, which generally sold replica souvenirs or curios made by multiple tribes. In 1941, Fidel closed the curio shop and began selling general goods again. The building now houses an art gallery called Gallery 66.

The building was added to the National Register of Historic Places on October 7, 2009.

== See also ==
- National Register of Historic Places listings in Cibola County, New Mexico
