= Laguna, New Mexico =

Laguna, New Mexico Kawaika (Western Keres)
- Census-designated place
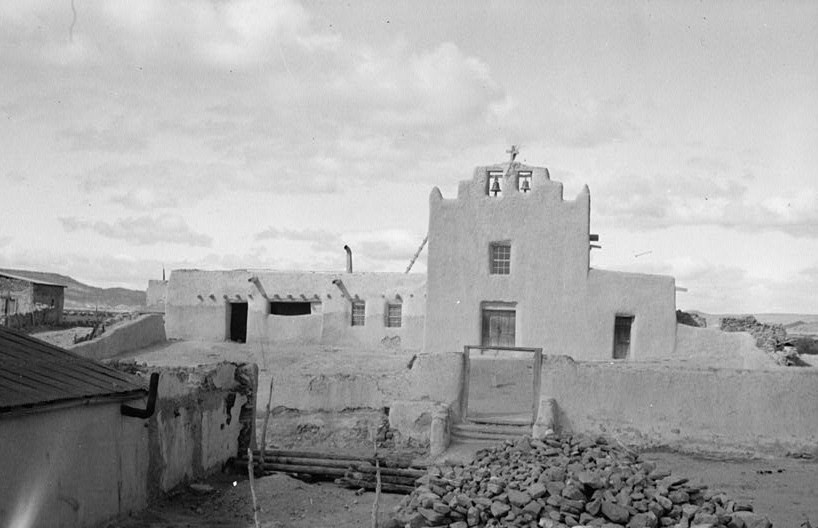
- Laguna Mission, 1934. Photo: Historic American Buildings Survey

- Location of Laguna, New Mexico

- Location in the United States Laguna (the United States)
- Coordinates: 35°02′46″N 107°23′14″W
- Country: United States
- State: New Mexico
- County: Cibola

Area
  - Total: 9.56 sq mi (24.75 km^{2})
  - Land: 9.55 sq mi (24.74 km^{2})
  - Water: 0.0039 sq mi (0.01 km^{2})
- Elevation: 5,830 ft (1,780 m)

Population (2020)
  - Total: 1,282
  - Density: 134.2/sq mi (51.82/km^{2})
- Time zone: UTC-7 (Mountain (MST))
  - Summer (DST): UTC-6 (MDT)
- ZIP code: 87026
- Area code: 505
- FIPS code: 35-37070
- GNIS feature ID: 2408523

Laguna (Western Keres: Kawaika; Western Keres pronunciation: [kʰɑwɑjkʰɑ]) is a census-designated place (CDP) on the Laguna Pueblo in Cibola County, New Mexico, United States. As of the 2020 census, Laguna had a population of 1,282. It is located approximately 47 miles west of Albuquerque.

Laguna was founded in 1699, making it the most recent of the New Mexican pueblos. The people of Laguna Pueblo speak Western Keresan. Laguna is home to an annual feast to Saint Joseph .

== History ==
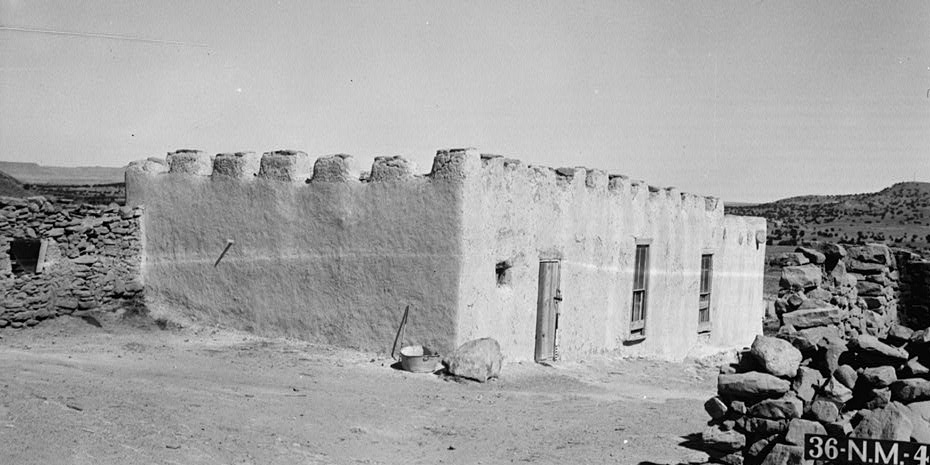
Old Pueblo Council meeting house, built c.1874. 1934 photo

The San Jose de la Laguna Mission and Convento, built starting in 1699, is in Laguna. It is extremely well-preserved, and has been listed on the National Register of Historic Places since 1973.

Anton Docher, the "Padre of Isleta", served as a priest in Laguna during his long period in Isleta.

== Geography ==
Laguna is located in eastern Cibola County and is bordered to the west by Paraje, to the southeast by Mesita, and to the south by Interstate 40, which provides access from Exit 114. Old U.S. Route 66 passes through the community.

According to the United States Census Bureau, the CDP has a total area of 10.9 square miles (28.3 km^{2}), all land. The CDP includes the original settlement of Laguna as well as New Laguna, about 2.5 miles (4.0 km) to the west on old Highway 66.

== Demographics ==
Historical population
Census	Pop.	Note	%±
2020	1,282		—
U.S. Decennial Census

As of the census of 2000, there were 423 people, 136 households, and 108 families residing in the CDP. The population density was 164.2 inhabitants per square mile (63.4/km^{2}). There were 172 housing units at an average density of 66.8 per square mile (25.8/km^{2}). The racial makeup of the CDP was 2.36% White, 96.45% Native American, 0.24% from other races, and 0.47% from two or more races. Hispanic or Latino of any race were 3.07% of the population.

There were 136 households, out of which 31.6% had children under the age of 18 living with them, 47.8% were married couples living together, 25.0% had a female householder with no husband present, and 19.9% were non-families. 17.6% of all households were made up of individuals, and 6.6% had someone living alone who was 65 years of age or older. The average household size was 3.11 and the average family size was 3.44.

In the CDP, the population was spread out, with 27.0% under the age of 18, 8.0% from 18 to 24, 28.6% from 25 to 44, 22.0% from 45 to 64, and 14.4% who were 65 years of age or older. The median age was 38 years. For every 100 females, there were 90.5 males. For every 100 females age 18 and over, there were 89.6 males.

The median income for a household in the CDP was $19,250, and the median income for a family was $19,750. Males had a median income of $19,000 versus $17,188 for females. The per capita income for the CDP was $10,980. About 28.6% of families and 27.1% of the population were below the poverty line, including 25.4% of those under age 18 and 30.9% of those age 65 or over.

== Education ==
All public schools in the county are operated by Grants/Cibola County Schools.

Cubero Elementary School and Laguna Acoma Middle-High School serve the area.

There is a tribal elementary school, affiliated with the Bureau of Indian Education (BIE), called Laguna Elementary School.

== See also ==
- List of census-designated places in New Mexico
- Laguna Pueblo
