= New Laguna, New Mexico =

- Unincorporated community
- Location within New Mexico
- Coordinates: 35°02′27″N 107°25′19″W
- Country: United States
- State: New Mexico
- County: Cibola
- Elevation: 5,869 ft (1,789 m)
- Time zone: UTC-7 (Mountain (MST))
  - Summer (DST): UTC-6 (MDT)
- ZIP code: 87038
- Area code: 505
- GNIS feature ID: 899812

New Laguna is an unincorporated community in Cibola County, New Mexico, United States. New Laguna is located along New Mexico State Road 124, 2.25 miles (3.62 km) west of Laguna. New Laguna has a post office with ZIP code 87038.
