= Seama, California =

Lost town in Monterey County, California

Seama is a former Salinan settlement in Monterey County, California, United States. Its precise location is unknown.
