= Bowlin's Old Crater Trading Post =

- U.S. National Register of Historic Places
- NM State Register of Cultural Properties
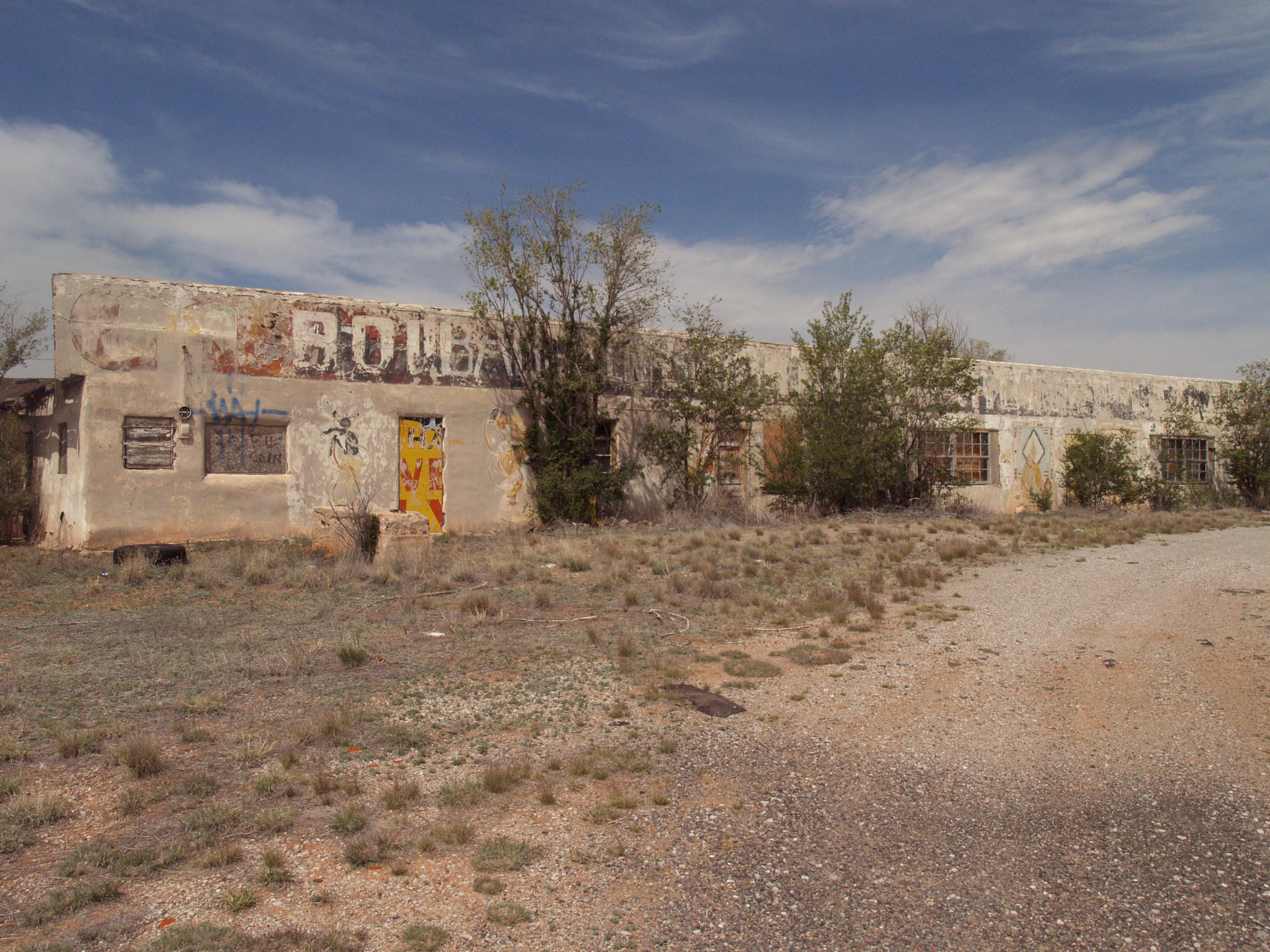

- Location within New Mexico Location within the United States
- Nearest city: Bluewater, New Mexico
- Coordinates: 35°17′3″N 107°59′11″W
- Area: 2.5 acres (1.0 ha)
- Built: 1954
- MPS: Route 66 through New Mexico MPS
- NRHP reference No.: 06000150
- NMSRCP No.: 1885

Significant dates
- Added to NRHP: March 21, 2006
- Designated NMSRCP: December 5, 2005

Bowlin's Old Crater Trading Post is a former trading post which was located along historic U.S. Route 66 in Bluewater, New Mexico. The trading post was built in 1954 by Claude Bowlin. Bowlin had traded with local Navajo since 1912, and he built his first trading post at the site in 1936. The store's name came from a volcanic crater that drew tourists to the area. While the trading post initially served the Navajo, it soon served tourists as well due to increased traffic on Route 66. Inspired by his success, Bowlin built a chain of stores throughout New Mexico, which became Bowlin Travel Centers, Inc. In 1954, Bowlin replaced his original trading post with the current building.

The trading post primarily sold Native American crafts and goods to its tourist market. Due to his experience trading with the Navajo, Bowlin was a member of the United Indian Traders Association and only sold authentic Native American products at his trading post. Bowlin also offered pamphlets to tourists which explained how to differentiate authentic Native American jewelry from replicas. The trading post also functioned as a community center for the local Navajo population, and Bowlin and his family hosted community activities and contests. The building's exterior was painted with pop culture depictions of Native Americans.

The trading post closed in 1973 after Interstate 40 bypassed Route 66 in the region. Bowlin died soon afterward, and his wife sold the building, with the stipulation that it only be used for religious purposes. The Bluewater Bible School and Church used the building in the 1980s and 1990s. The building was added to the National Register of Historic Places on March 21, 2006. The Bowlin chain still serves Bluewater through a modern travel center, the Bluewater Outpost.

== See also ==
- National Register of Historic Places listings in New Mexico
