= Seama, New Mexico =

- Census-designated place
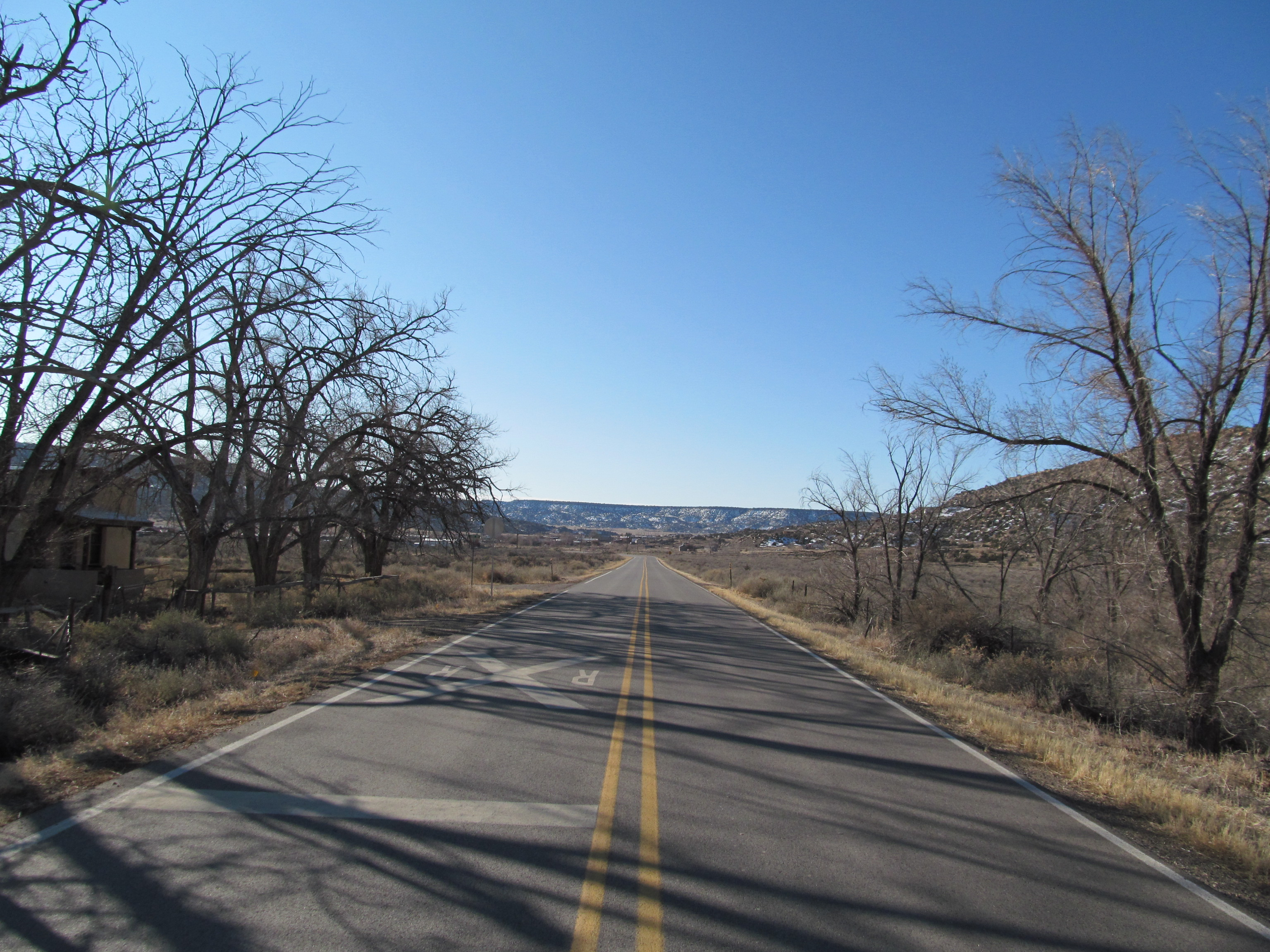
- BIA Route 24; Rainfall Road

- Location of Seama, New Mexico

- Location in the United States
- Coordinates: 35°02′45″N 107°30′30″W
- Country: United States
- State: New Mexico
- County: Cibola

Area
  - Total: 6.49 sq mi (16.81 km^{2})
  - Land: 6.49 sq mi (16.80 km^{2})
  - Water: 0.0039 sq mi (0.01 km^{2})
- Elevation: 5,971 ft (1,820 m)

Population (2020)
  - Total: 478
  - Density: 73.7/sq mi (28.45/km^{2})
- Time zone: UTC-7 (Mountain (MST))
  - Summer (DST): UTC-6 (MDT)
- Area code: 505
- FIPS code: 35-71440
- GNIS feature ID: 2409294

Seama is a census-designated place (CDP) in Cibola County, New Mexico, United States. As of the 2020 census, Seama had a population of 478.

== Geography ==
Seama is located in northeastern Cibola County along the western edge of the lands of the Laguna Pueblo. It is bordered to the west by North Acomita Village and South Acomita Village within Acoma Pueblo lands, to the north by Cubero, and to the east by Paraje.

Seama is in the valley of the Rio San Jose, an eastward-flowing tributary of the Rio Puerco. Interstate 40 passes through the CDP, with access from Exit 104. It is 23 miles (37 km) west to Grants, the Cibola County seat, and 56 miles (90 km) east to Albuquerque.

According to the United States Census Bureau, the Seama CDP has a total area of 6.3 square miles (16.2 km^{2}), of which 0.004 square miles (0.01 km^{2}), or 0.08%, is water.

== Demographics ==
Historical population
Census	Pop.	Note	%±
2020	478		—
U.S. Decennial Census

As of the census of 2000, there were 333 people, 88 households, and 74 families residing in the CDP. The population density was 62.6 inhabitants per square mile (24.2/km^{2}). There were 104 housing units at an average density of 19.5 per square mile (7.5/km^{2}). The racial makeup of the CDP was 0.30% White, 0.30% African American, 98.50% Native American, and 0.90% from two or more races. Hispanic or Latino of any race were 2.40% of the population.

There were 88 households, out of which 46.6% had children under the age of 18 living with them, 40.9% were married couples living together, 30.7% had a female householder with no husband present, and 14.8% were non-families. 12.5% of all households were made up of individuals, and 5.7% had someone living alone who was 65 years of age or older. The average household size was 3.78 and the average family size was 4.08.

In the CDP, the population was spread out, with 36.6% under the age of 18, 11.1% from 18 to 24, 24.9% from 25 to 44, 17.7% from 45 to 64, and 9.6% who were 65 years of age or older. The median age was 27 years. For every 100 females, there were 89.2 males. For every 100 females age 18 and over, there were 80.3 males.

The median income for a household in the CDP was $42,917, and the median income for a family was $43,958. Males had a median income of $31,042 versus $14,500 for females. The per capita income for the CDP was $8,871. About 14.7% of families and 14.6% of the population were below the poverty line, including 12.1% of those under age 18 and 42.1% of those age 65 or over.

== Education ==
All public schools in the county are operated by Grants/Cibola County Schools.
