= San Fidel, New Mexico =

- Census-designated place
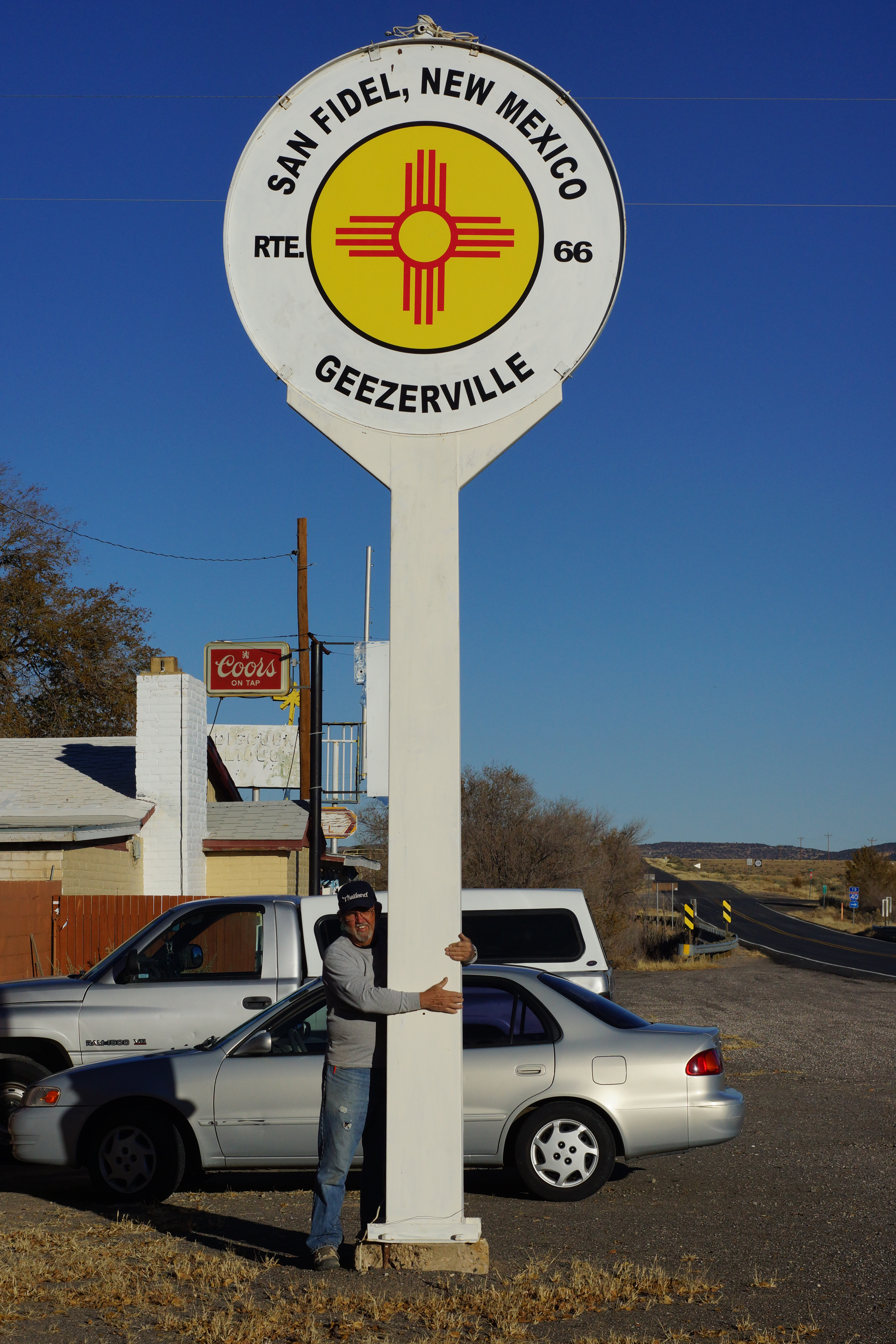

- Location within New Mexico
- Coordinates: 35°06′56″N 107°35′53″W
- Country: United States
- State: New Mexico
- County: Cibola

Area
  - Total: 4.21 sq mi (10.90 km^{2})
  - Land: 4.21 sq mi (10.90 km^{2})
  - Water: 0 sq mi (0.00 km^{2})
- Elevation: 6,296 ft (1,919 m)

Population (2020)
  - Total: 124
  - Density: 29.5/sq mi (11.38/km^{2})
- Time zone: UTC-7 (Mountain (MST))
  - Summer (DST): UTC-6 (MDT)
- ZIP code: 87049
- Area code: 505
- GNIS feature ID: 2584205

San Fidel is a census-designated place in Cibola County, New Mexico, United States. As of the 2020 census, San Fidel had a population of 124. San Fidel has a post office with ZIP code 87049, which opened on December 24, 1910. New Mexico State Road 124, the original Route 66, also known as the "Old Road," passes through the community.

The Acoma Curio Shop, which is listed on the National Register of Historic Places, is located in San Fidel.

Historical population
| Census | Pop. | Note | %± |
|---|---|---|---|
| 2020 | 124 | | — |
U.S. Decennial Census
