= Casa Blanca, New Mexico =

- Unincorporated community
- Location within New Mexico
- Coordinates: 35°02′44″N 107°28′17″W
- Country: United States
- State: New Mexico
- County: Cibola
- Elevation: 5,909 ft (1,801 m)
- Time zone: UTC-7 (Mountain (MST))
  - Summer (DST): UTC-6 (MDT)
- ZIP code: 87007
- Area code: 505
- GNIS feature ID: 899561

Casa Blanca is an unincorporated community in Cibola County, New Mexico, United States. Casa Blanca is located on New Mexico State Road 23, 22.6 miles (36.4 km) east-southeast of Grants. It is part of the Paraje census-designated place. Casa Blanca has a post office with ZIP code 87007, which opened on September 22, 1905.
