= Encinal, New Mexico =

- Census-designated place
- Location of Encinal, New Mexico

- Location in the United States
- Coordinates: 35°07′12″N 107°28′02″W
- Country: United States
- State: New Mexico
- County: Cibola

Area
  - Total: 2.97 sq mi (7.68 km^{2})
  - Land: 2.97 sq mi (7.68 km^{2})
  - Water: 0 sq mi (0.00 km^{2})
- Elevation: 6,293 ft (1,918 m)

Population (2020)
  - Total: 207
  - Density: 69.8/sq mi (26.95/km^{2})
- Time zone: UTC-7 (Mountain (MST))
  - Summer (DST): UTC-6 (MDT)
- Area code: 505
- FIPS code: 35-24540
- GNIS feature ID: 2408082

Encinal is a census-designated place (CDP) in Cibola County, New Mexico, United States. It is the smallest of the six villages of the Laguna Pueblo and sits at the base of Mount Taylor. As of the 2020 census, Encinal had a population of 207.

== Geography ==
Encinal is located in northeastern Cibola County 5 miles (8 km) northeast of Cubero and 7 miles (11 km) northeast of Exit 104 on Interstate 40. Picacho Peak, known locally as Elephant Rock, is a large rock formation 2 miles (3 km) to the west of the village.

According to the United States Census Bureau, the CDP has a total area of 13.5 square miles (34.9 km^{2}), all land.

== Demographics ==
Historical population
Census	Pop.	Note	%±
2020	207		—
U.S. Decennial Census

As of the census of 2000, there were 200 people, 58 households, and 48 families residing in the CDP. The population density was 14.7 inhabitants per square mile (5.7/km^{2}). There were 67 housing units at an average density of 4.9 per square mile (1.9/km^{2}). The racial makeup of the CDP was 97.50% Native American, 1.50% White, and 1.00% from two or more races. Hispanic or Latino of any race were 3.00% of the population.

There were 58 households, out of which 27.6% had children under the age of 18 living with them, 44.8% were married couples living together, 29.3% had a female householder with no husband present, and 17.2% were non-families. 15.5% of all households were made up of individuals, and 6.9% had someone living alone who was 65 years of age or older. The average household size was 3.45 and the average family size was 3.81.

In the CDP, the population was spread out, with 29.0% under the age of 18, 12.5% from 18 to 24, 23.0% from 25 to 44, 25.5% from 45 to 64, and 10.0% who were 65 years of age or older. The median age was 35 years. For every 100 females, there were 90.5 males. For every 100 females age 18 and over, there were 91.9 males.

The median income for a household in the CDP was $40,938, and the median income for a family was $50,208. Males had a median income of $20,625 versus $18,281 for females. The per capita income for the CDP was $9,496. About 18.5% of families and 23.8% of the population were below the poverty line, including 24.7% of those under the age of eighteen and 30.8% of those 65 or over.

== Education ==
All public schools in the county are operated by Grants/Cibola County Schools.

== Sites ==
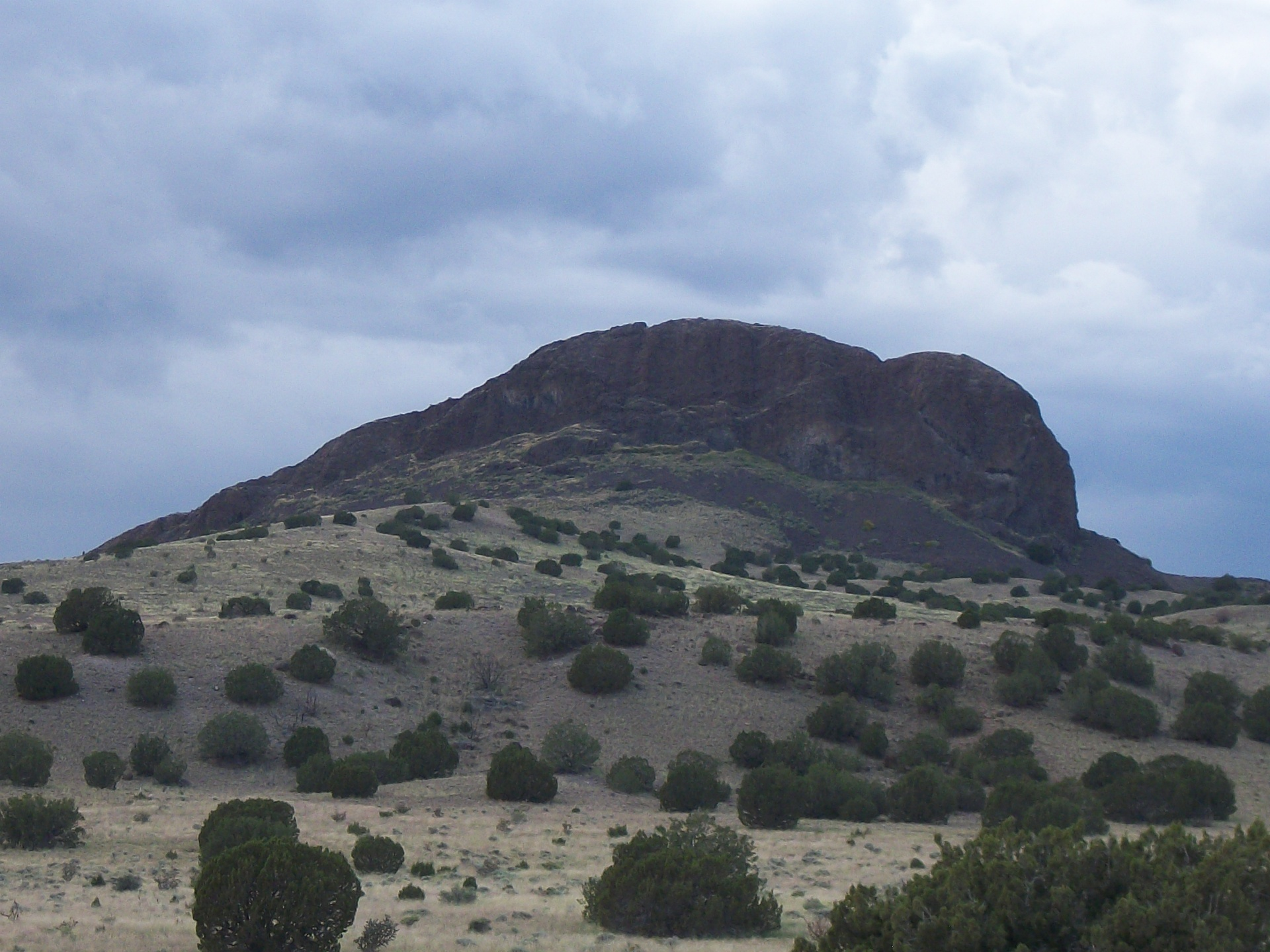
Picacho Peak, known locally as Elephant Rock

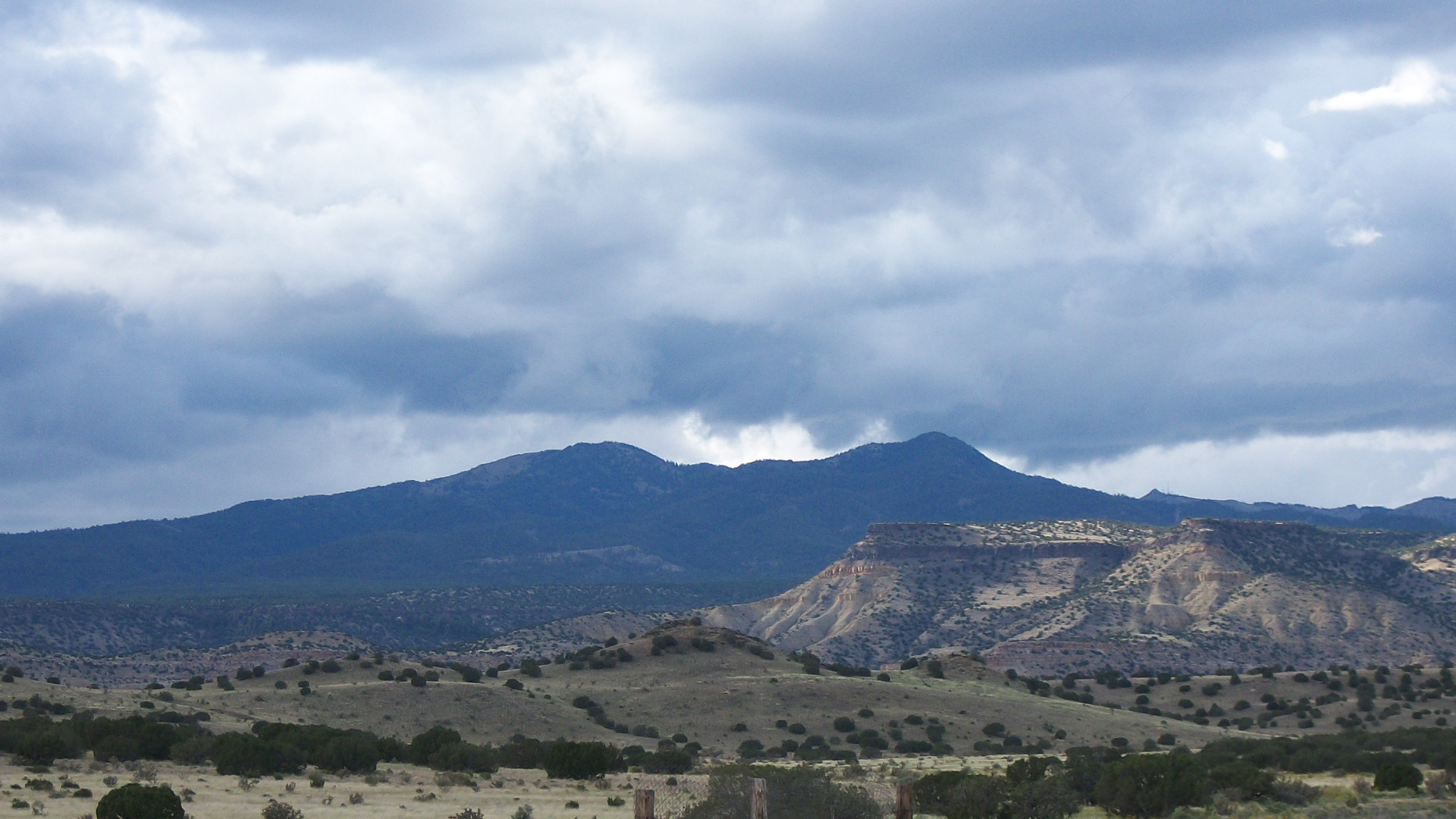
Mount Taylor seen from the village of Encinal

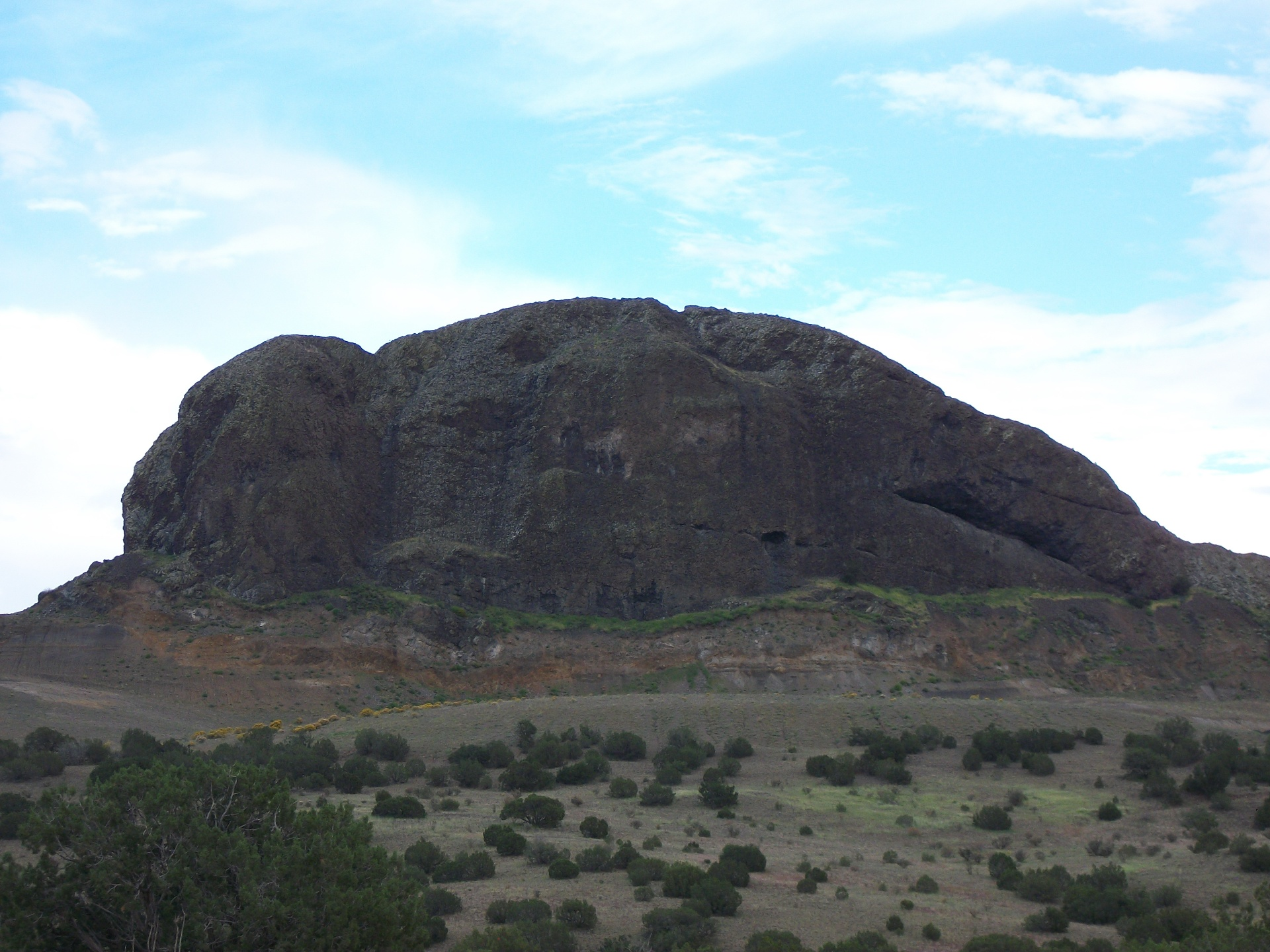
Picacho Peak, a view from the west

== See also ==
- List of census-designated places in New Mexico
