= San José de la Laguna Mission and Convento =

- U.S. National Register of Historic Places
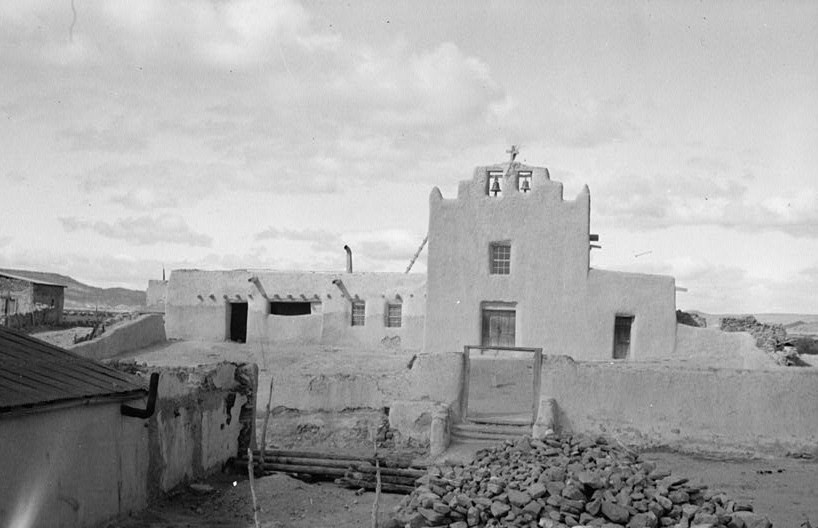
- HABS photo from 1934

- Location within New Mexico
- Location: 1 Friar Rd; Laguna, New Mexico
- Coordinates: 35.034733°N 107.388510°W
- Built: 1699
- Built by: Fray Antonio Miranda
- Architectural style: Mission
- NRHP reference No.: 73001155
- Added to NRHP: January 29, 1973

The San José de la Laguna Mission and Convento, in Laguna, New Mexico, dates from 1699. It was listed on the National Register of Historic Places in 1973, with note that it "is one of the best preserved buildings of its type in the United States. It retains most of the structures and artifacts which were placed in the Mission almost 300 years ago."

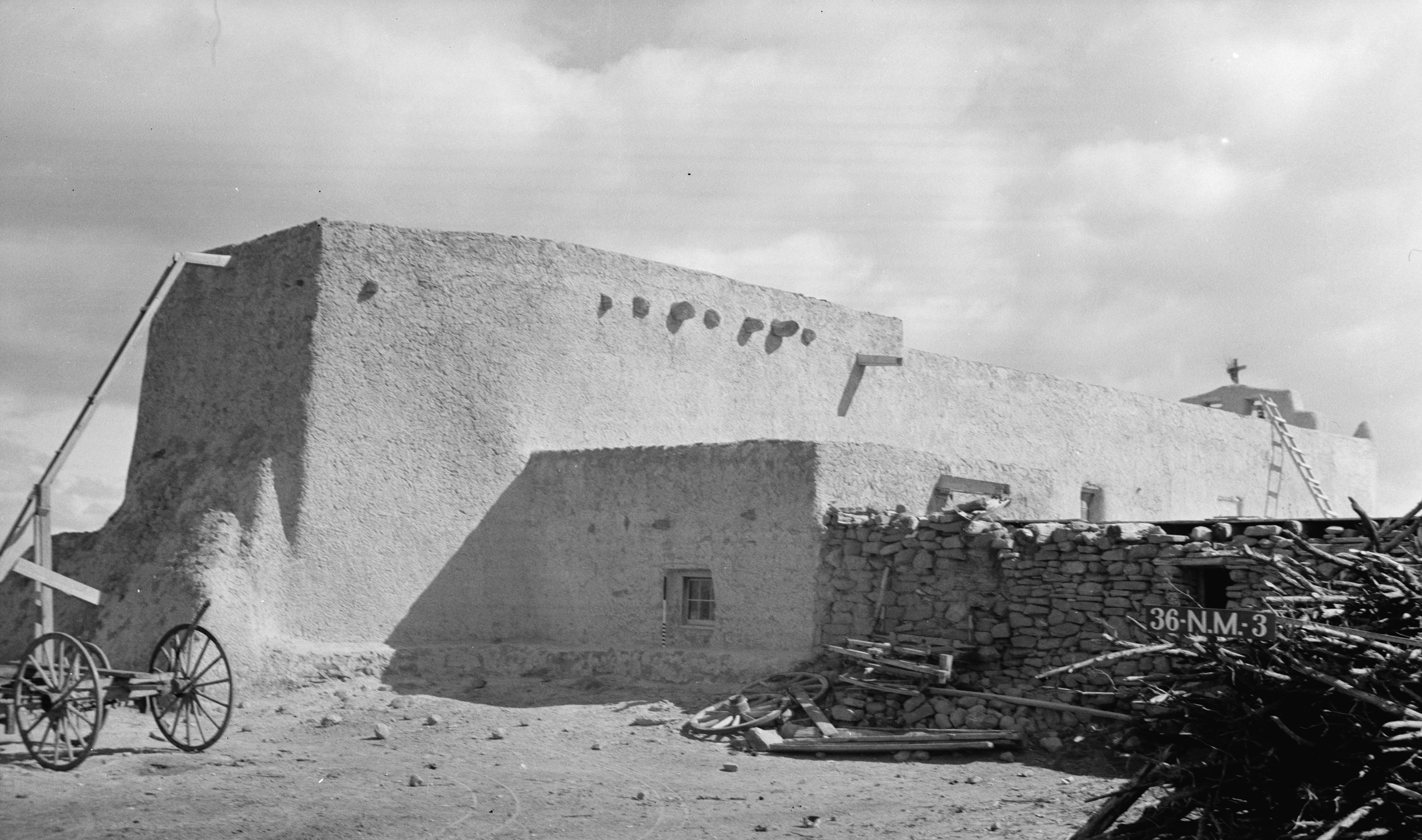
View from side and rear

It is an adobe building which was built under direction of Fray Antonio Miranda in 1699 and following years. It is currently a parish church for the Roman Catholic Diocese of Gallup.
