= Albuquerque–Santa Fe–Los Alamos combined statistical area =

- Combined statistical area
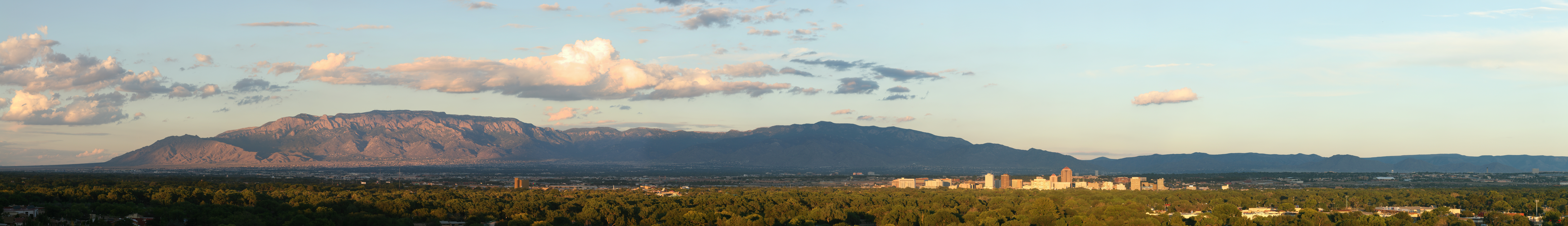
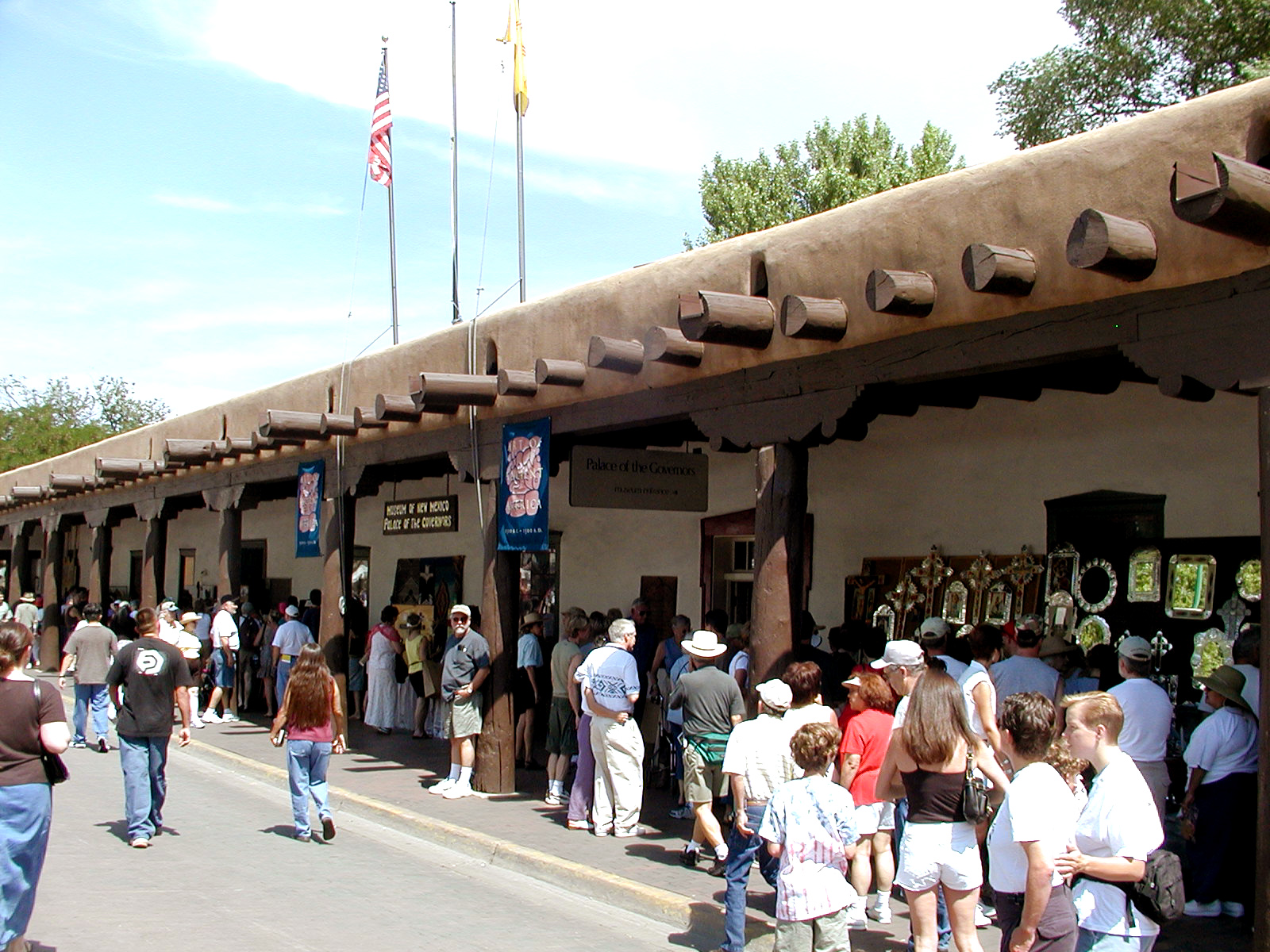
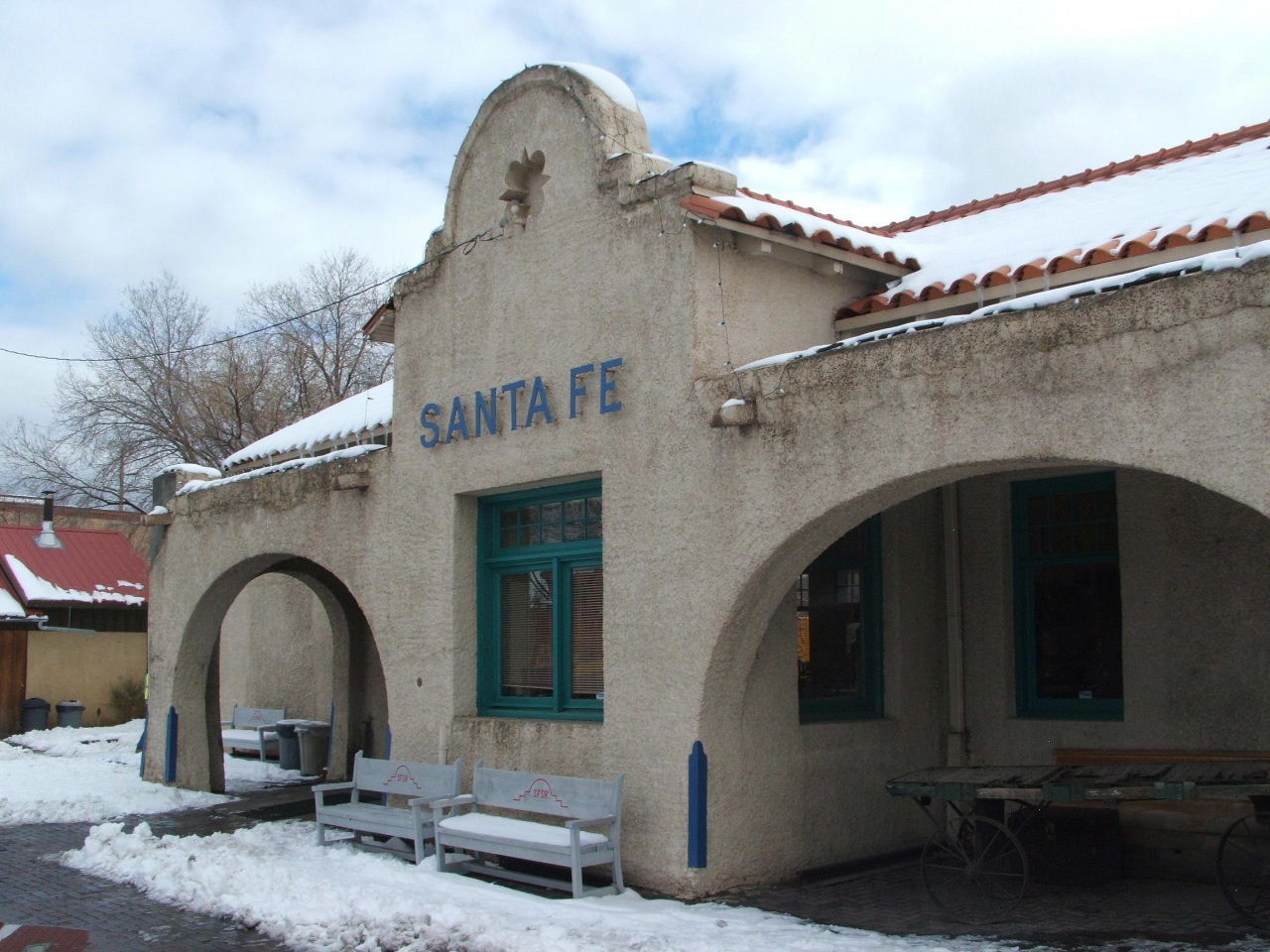
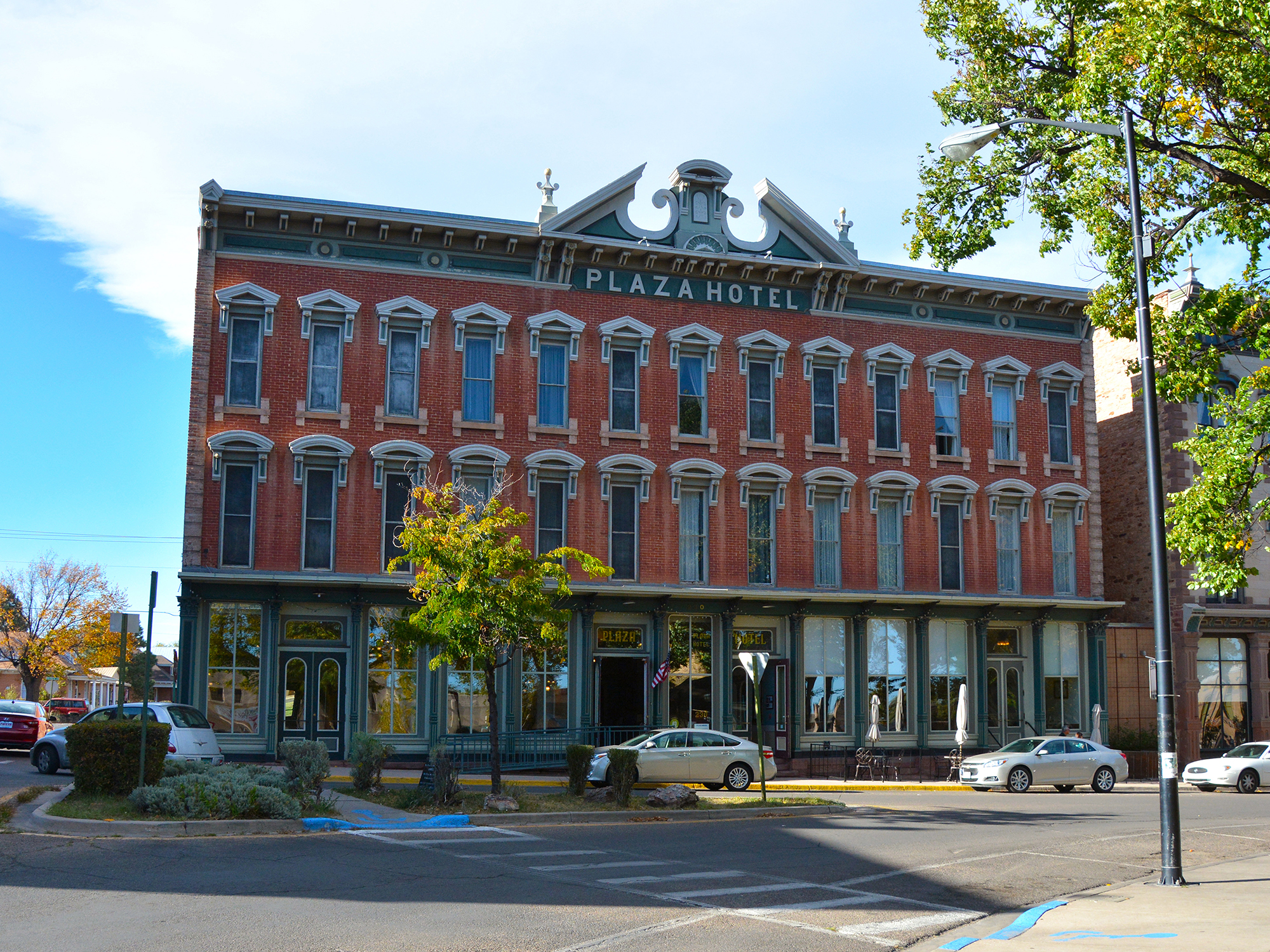
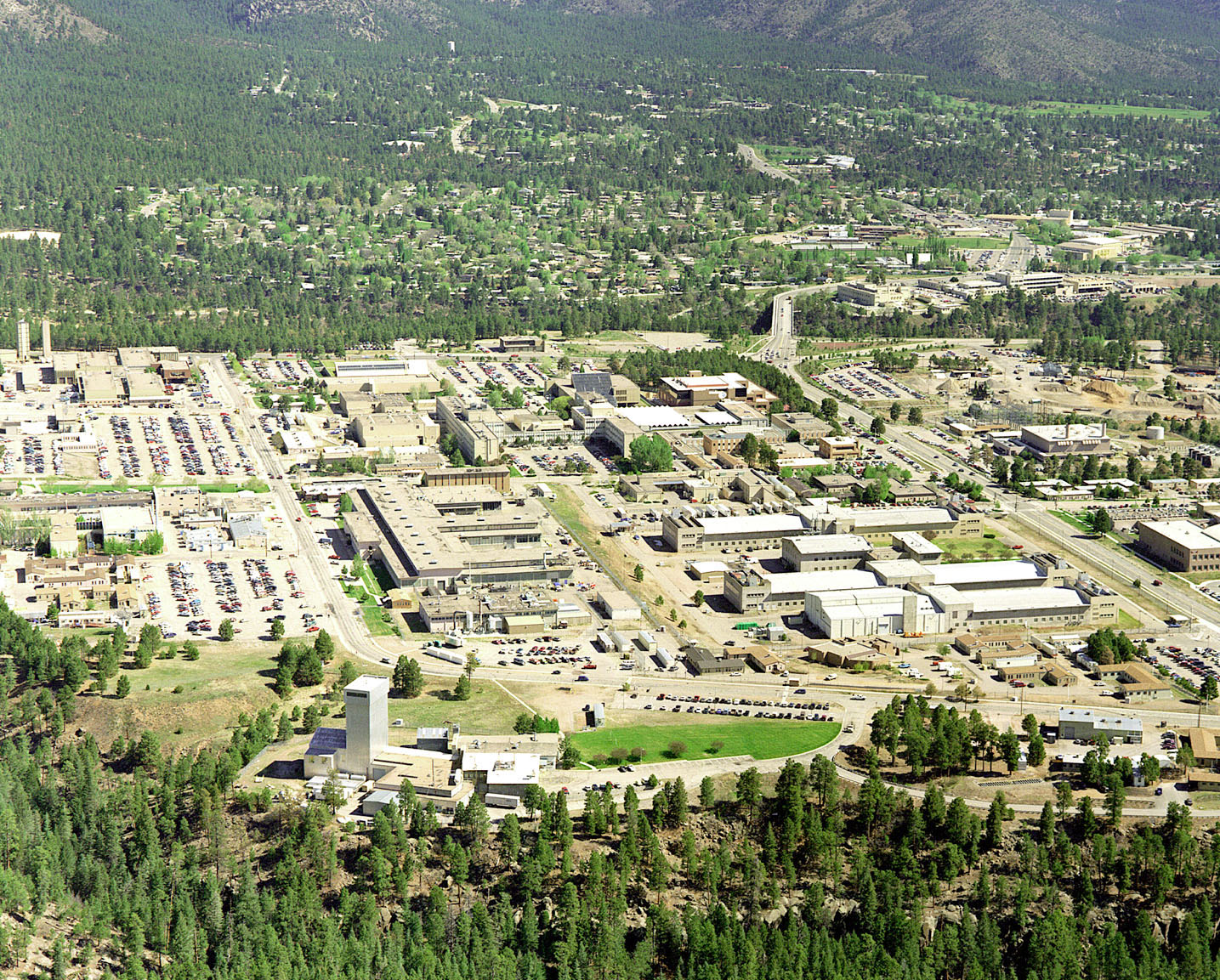
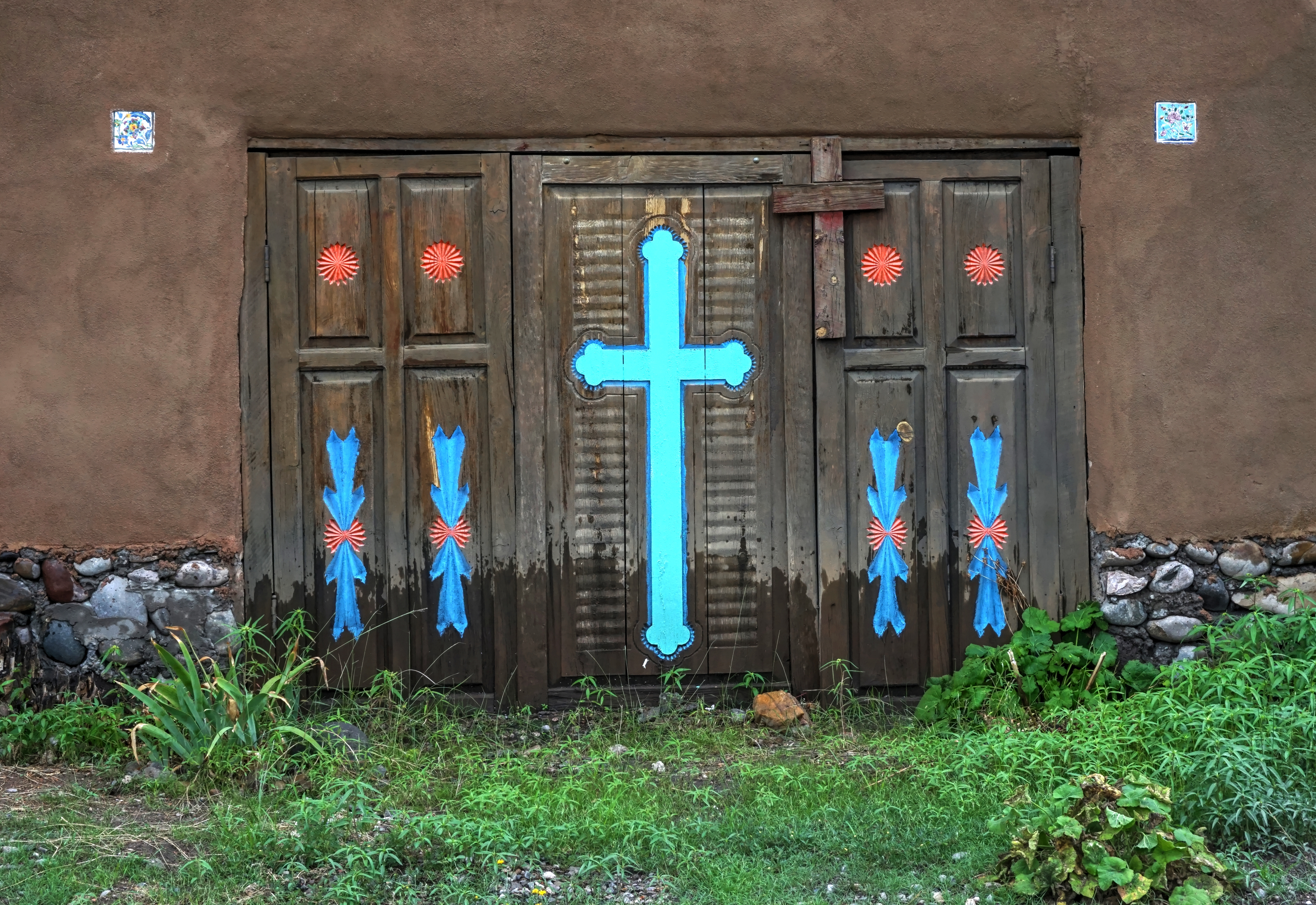
- (top) Panorama of the city of Albuquerque; (middle, left-to-right) Palace of the Governors, Santa Fe Depot in Santa Fe; (bottom, left-to-right) Plaza Hotel in Las Vegas, Los Alamos National Laboratory in Los Alamos, Pueblo Revival and Territorial Revival architectural traditional door styling in Española
Map of Albuquerque–Santa Fe–Los Alamos, NM
Albuquerque, NM MSA
Santa Fe, NM MSA
Española, NM μSA
Las Vegas, NM μSA
Los Alamos, NM μSA
- Country: United States
- State: New Mexico
- Largest city: Albuquerque
- Other cities: - Rio Rancho; - Santa Fe; - Los Alamos; - Los Lunas; - Las Vegas; - Española

Area
  - Total: 26,421 sq mi (68,430 km^{2})

Population (2020)
  - Total: 1,162,523
  - Density: 44.000/sq mi (16.988/km^{2})
- Time zone: UTC-7 (MST)
  - Summer (DST): UTC-6 (MDT)

The Albuquerque–Santa Fe–Los Alamos combined statistical area (known as the Santa Fe–Española combined statistical area until 2013) is made up of eight counties in north central New Mexico. The combined statistical area consists of the Albuquerque and Santa Fe metropolitan statistical areas, and the Las Vegas, Los Alamos, and Española micropolitan statistical areas. The 2013 delineations included the Grants micropolitan statistical area, but it was removed in the 2018 revisions. As of the 2020 census, the CSA had a population of 1,162,523. Roughly 56% of New Mexico's residents live in this area. Prior to the 2013 redefinitions, the CSA consisted only of the Santa Fe metropolitan statistical area and the Española micropolitan statistical area. The total land area of the Albuquerque–Santa Fe–Las Vegas combined statistical area in the 2013 definition is 26,421 sq mi (68,430 km^{2}).

== Counties ==
- Bernalillo County
- Los Alamos County
- Rio Arriba County
- Sandoval County
- San Miguel County
- Santa Fe County
- Torrance County
- Valencia County

== Communities ==
=== Bernalillo County ===
- Albuquerque (Principal city)
- Carnuel
- Cedar Crest
- Chilili
- Isleta Pueblo
- Isleta Village Proper
- Los Ranchos de Albuquerque
- Laguna Pueblo
- North Valley
- San Antonito
- South Valley
- Tijeras
- Zuzax
- Barton ( SW corner overlaps with Santa Fe County)

=== Los Alamos County ===
- Los Alamos (City)
- White Rock

=== Rio Arriba County ===
- Abiquiú
- Alcalde
- Chama
- Chimayó
- Canjilon
- Cañones
- Cordova
- Coyote
- Dixon
- Dulce
- El Rito
- Embudo
- Española (City)
- Gallina
- Hernandez
- La Madera
- Las Tablas
- Medanales
- Ohkay Owingeh
- Petaca
- San Juan
- Santa Clara Pueblo
- Tierra Amarilla
- Truchas
- Velarde

=== Sandoval County ===
- Algodones
- Bernalillo
- Cochiti
- Corrales
- Cuba
- Jemez Pueblo
- Jemez Springs
- La Jara
- Laguna Pueblo
- Peña Blanca
- Placitas
- Ponderosa
- Pueblo of Sandia Village
- Regina
- Rio Rancho (City)
- San Felipe Pueblo
- Santa Ana Pueblo
- Santo Domingo Pueblo
- San Ysidro
- Torreon (Sandoval County)
- Zia Pueblo

=== San Miguel County ===
- Conchas Dam
- Las Ruedas
- Las Vegas (Principal city)
- Montezuma
- Mosquero
- North San Ysidro
- Pecos
- Ribera
- Rowe
- South San Ysidro
- Valles de San Geronimo
- Villanueva

=== Santa Fe County ===
- Agua Fria
- Cañada de los Alamos
- Cedar Grove
- Chimayó
- Chupadero
- Cuartelez
- Cundiyo
- Cuyamungue
- Edgewood
- El Rancho
- El Valle de Arroyo Seco
- Eldorado at Santa Fe
- Española (Part of)
- Galisteo
- Glorieta
- Jaconita
- La Cienega
- La Puebla
- Lamy
- Los Cerrillos
- Nambé Pueblo
- Madrid
- Pojoaque
- Rio Chiquito
- Rio en Medio
- San Ildefonso Pueblo
- Santa Cruz
- Santa Fe (Principal city)
- Seton Village
- Sombrillo
- Stanley
- Tesuque
- Waldo

=== Torrance County ===
- Abo
- Duran
- Encino
- Estancia
- Manzano
- McIntosh
- Moriarty (City)
- Mountainair
- Progresso
- Tajique
- Torreon (Torrance County)
- Willard

=== Valencia County ===
- Belen (City)
- Bosque Farms
- Casa Colorada
- El Cerro-Monterey Park
- Jarales
- Laguna Pueblo
- Los Chaves
- Los Lunas
- Los Trujillos-Gabaldon
- Meadow Lake
- Peralta, New Mexico
- Rio Communities
- Rio Communities North
- Tomé-Adelino
- Valencia

== See also ==
- List of metropolitan areas in New Mexico
- List of micropolitan areas in New Mexico
- List of cities in New Mexico
