= Century High School (Los Lunas, New Mexico) =

Coordinates: 34°47′49″N 106°42′36″W

Location
- 32 Sun Valley Road; Los Lunas, Valencia County, New Mexico; United States

Information
- School type: Alternative high school

Century High School is an alternative high school for the Los Lunas Public Schools in Los Lunas, New Mexico.

== Location ==
The school is located at 32 Sun Valley Road in Los Lunas, New Mexico.
