= 2000 United States presidential election in New Mexico =

- November 7, 2000

Nominee	Al Gore	George W. Bush
Party	Democratic	Republican
Home state	Tennessee	Texas
Running mate	Joe Lieberman	Dick Cheney
Electoral vote	5	0
Popular vote	286,783	286,417
Percentage	47.91%	47.85%

Gore
30-40%
40–50%
50–60%
60–70%
70–80%
80–90%
Bush
40–50%
50–60%
60–70%
70–80%
80–90%
90–100%
No data
President before election
Bill Clinton
Democratic
Elected President
George W. Bush
Republican

The 2000 United States presidential election in New Mexico took place on November 7, 2000, and was part of the 2000 United States presidential election. Voters chose five electors to the Electoral College, who voted for president and vice president. New Mexico was won by Vice President Al Gore by a 0.06 percent margin. It was the closest state in the entire presidential election by raw vote margin (366 votes), which was even closer than Florida. News outlets called New Mexico for Gore at approximately 10:21 p.m. (EST), but later retracted the call when it was determined to be too close to call.

Gore was not declared the winner of the state until November 17. This would be the first election in which New Mexico did not vote for the winning candidate since 1976 and the first time since its statehood in 1912 that it voted for a different candidate than Nevada, although New Mexico did vote for the popular vote winner in this election. As of 2024, this is the last time that New Mexico voted more Republican than the nation as a whole or that it voted differently than neighboring Colorado. Bush became the first Republican to win the White House without carrying the state of New Mexico since its statehood, as well as the first to win without Bernalillo County. This also marked the first of only three times since its statehood in 1912 that a non-incumbent Republican won the White House without carrying New Mexico (along with 2016 and 2024).

In the days following the election, when the disputes and recounts began, New Mexico, despite having a razor-thin margin, went largely ignored. Its five electoral votes alone would not have changed the overall outcome in the Electoral College, regardless of how the Florida result was resolved. The respective campaigns ended up paying little attention to recount efforts in New Mexico, and focused their efforts solely on Florida. Likewise, the media focused very little on the New Mexico recount. After the final count was certified for Gore on November 30, the Bush campaign did not challenge the results.

== General election ==
=== Polling ===
Poll source	Date(s)	Sample size	Margin of error	George W. Bush (R)	Al Gore (D)	Ralph Nader (G)	Other / undecided (Note: Calculated by taking the difference of 100% and all other candidates combined.)
Harris Insights & Analytics	November 3, 2000	1,657	—	44%	49%	6%	1%
Mason-Dixon Polling & Strategy	November 2, 2000	625	—	45%	45%	4%	6%
Research & Polling Inc.	November 1, 2000	769	—	44%	41%	5%	10%

=== Results ===
2000 United States presidential election in New Mexico
Party	Candidate	Votes	%	±%
Democratic	Al Gore; Joe Lieberman	286,783	47.91%	−1.27
Republican	George W. Bush; Dick Cheney	286,417	47.85%	+5.99
Green	Ralph Nader; Winona LaDuke	21,251	3.55%	+1.17
Libertarian	Harry Browne; Art Olivier	2,058	0.34%	−0.20
Reform	Pat Buchanan; Ezola Foster	1,392	0.23%	−5.57
Natural Law	John Hagelin; Nat Goldhaber	361	0.06%	−0.06
Constitution	Howard Phillips; Curtis Frazier	343	0.06%	−0.07
Total votes		598,605	100.00%	
Democratic win				

==== Results by county ====
County	Al Gore Democratic		George W. Bush Republican		Ralph Nader Pacific Green		Various candidates Other parties		Margin		Total votes cast
County	#	%	#	%	#	%	#	%	#	%	Total votes cast
Bernalillo	99,461	48.68%	95,249	46.62%	8,274	4.05%	1,335	0.65%	4,212	2.06%	204,319
Catron	353	20.63%	1,273	74.40%	57	3.33%	28	1.64%	-920	-53.77%	1,711
Chaves	6,340	34.93%	11,378	62.69%	307	1.69%	124	0.68%	-5,038	-27.76%	18,149
Cibola	4,127	58.23%	2,752	38.83%	164	2.31%	45	0.64%	1,375	19.40%	7,088
Colfax	2,653	48.58%	2,600	47.61%	163	2.98%	45	0.82%	53	0.97%	5,461
Curry	3,471	29.00%	8,301	69.35%	147	1.23%	50	0.42%	-4,830	-40.35%	11,969
De Baca	349	35.54%	612	62.32%	12	1.22%	9	0.91%	-263	-26.78%	982
Doña Ana	23,912	51.26%	21,263	45.58%	1,158	2.48%	320	0.69%	2,649	5.68%	46,653
Eddy	7,108	39.96%	10,335	58.10%	256	1.44%	88	0.49%	-3,227	-18.14%	17,787
Grant	5,673	50.47%	4,961	44.13%	530	4.71%	77	0.68%	712	6.34%	11,241
Guadalupe	1,076	65.17%	548	33.19%	24	1.45%	3	0.18%	528	31.98%	1,651
Harding	214	36.09%	366	61.72%	9	1.52%	4	0.67%	-152	-25.63%	593
Hidalgo	839	45.75%	954	52.02%	28	1.53%	13	0.71%	-115	-6.27%	1,834
Lea	3,855	27.04%	10,157	71.25%	169	1.19%	75	0.53%	-6,302	-44.21%	14,256
Lincoln	2,027	29.93%	4,458	65.83%	168	2.48%	119	1.76%	-2,431	-35.90%	6,772
Los Alamos	4,149	40.60%	5,623	55.03%	329	3.22%	117	1.15%	-1,474	-14.43%	10,218
Luna	2,975	44.99%	3,395	51.35%	186	2.81%	56	0.85%	-420	-6.34%	6,612
McKinley	10,281	64.75%	5,070	31.93%	392	2.47%	136	0.86%	5,211	32.82%	15,879
Mora	1,456	66.45%	668	30.49%	49	2.24%	18	0.82%	788	35.96%	2,191
Otero	5,465	33.73%	10,258	63.31%	338	2.09%	143	0.88%	-4,793	-29.58%	16,204
Quay	1,471	38.27%	2,292	59.63%	51	1.33%	30	0.78%	-821	-21.36%	3,844
Rio Arriba	8,169	67.53%	3,495	28.89%	377	3.12%	56	0.46%	4,674	38.64%	12,097
Roosevelt	1,762	31.18%	3,762	66.57%	98	1.73%	29	0.51%	-2,000	-35.39%	5,651
San Juan	11,980	34.57%	21,434	61.85%	923	2.66%	320	0.92%	-9,454	-27.28%	34,657
San Miguel	6,540	71.39%	2,215	24.18%	344	3.76%	62	0.68%	4,325	47.21%	9,161
Sandoval	14,899	46.92%	15,423	48.57%	1,211	3.81%	222	0.70%	-524	-1.65%	31,755
Santa Fe	32,017	64.72%	13,974	28.25%	3,215	6.50%	265	0.54%	18,043	36.47%	49,471
Sierra	1,689	36.83%	2,721	59.33%	132	2.88%	44	0.96%	-1,032	-22.50%	4,586
Socorro	3,294	48.26%	3,173	46.48%	279	4.09%	80	1.17%	121	1.78%	6,826
Taos	7,039	64.61%	2,744	25.19%	1,064	9.77%	48	0.44%	4,295	39.42%	10,895
Torrance	1,868	37.66%	2,891	58.29%	163	3.29%	38	0.77%	-1,023	-20.63%	4,960
Union	452	25.75%	1,269	72.31%	19	1.08%	15	0.85%	-817	-46.56%	1,755
Valencia	9,819	45.93%	10,803	50.54%	615	2.88%	140	0.65%	-984	-4.61%	21,377
Totals	286,783	47.91%	286,417	47.85%	21,251	3.55%	4,154	0.69%	366	0.06%	598,605

===== Counties that flipped from Democratic to Republican =====
- De Baca (Largest village: Fort Sumner)
- Eddy (Largest city: Carlsbad)
- Hidalgo (Largest city: Lordsburg)
- Luna (Largest city: Deming)
- Sandoval (Largest city: Rio Rancho)
- Sierra (Largest city: Truth or Consequences)
- Valencia (Largest city: Los Lunas)

==== Results by congressional district ====
Gore won two of three congressional districts, including one held by a Republican.

District	Gore	Bush	Representative
1st	49%	46%	Heather Wilson
2nd	43%	54%	Joe Skeen
3rd	52%	43%	Tom Udall

== Electors ==
Technically the voters of New Mexico cast their ballots for electors: representatives to the Electoral College. New Mexico is allocated 5 electors because it has 3 congressional districts and 2 senators. All candidates who appear on the ballot or qualify to receive write-in votes must submit a list of 5 electors, who pledge to vote for their candidate and his or her running mate. Whoever wins the most votes in the state is awarded all 5 electoral votes. Their chosen electors then vote for president and vice president. Although electors are pledged to their candidate and running mate, they are not obligated to vote for them. An elector who votes for someone other than his or her candidate is known as a faithless elector.

The electors of each state and the District of Columbia met on December 18, 2000 to cast their votes for president and vice president. The Electoral College itself never meets as one body. Instead the electors from each state and the District of Columbia met in their respective capitols.

The following were the members of the Electoral College from the state. All were pledged to and voted for Gore and Lieberman:

1. Tom Atcitty
2. Rick Blea
3. Diane D. Denish
4. Jeep Gilliland
5. Mary Gail Gwaltney
