= El Cerro, New Mexico =

- Census-designated place
- Location within New Mexico
- Coordinates: 34°46′50″N 106°41′44″W
- Country: United States
- State: New Mexico
- County: Valencia

Area
  - Total: 4.25 sq mi (11.00 km^{2})
  - Land: 4.25 sq mi (11.00 km^{2})
  - Water: 0 sq mi (0.00 km^{2})
- Elevation: 4,843 ft (1,476 m)

Population (2020)
  - Total: 2,946
  - Density: 693.9/sq mi (267.91/km^{2})
- Time zone: UTC-7 (Mountain (MST))
  - Summer (DST): UTC-6 (MDT)
- GNIS feature ID: 2584092

El Cerro is a census-designated place in Valencia County, New Mexico, United States. As of the 2020 census, El Cerro had a population of 2,946. It is part of the Albuquerque Metropolitan Statistical Area.

== Demographics ==
Historical population
| Census | Pop. | Note | %± |
|---|---|---|---|
| 2020 | 2,946 | | — |
U.S. Decennial Census

=== 2020 census ===
As of the 2020 census, El Cerro had a population of 2,946. The median age was 47.1 years. 21.4% of residents were under the age of 18 and 24.0% of residents were 65 years of age or older. For every 100 females there were 99.6 males, and for every 100 females age 18 and over there were 94.5 males age 18 and over.

96.6% of residents lived in urban areas, while 3.4% lived in rural areas.

There were 1,105 households in El Cerro, of which 27.3% had children under the age of 18 living in them. Of all households, 56.7% were married-couple households, 16.4% were households with a male householder and no spouse or partner present, and 19.8% were households with a female householder and no spouse or partner present. About 22.4% of all households were made up of individuals and 11.9% had someone living alone who was 65 years of age or older.

There were 1,170 housing units, of which 5.6% were vacant. The homeowner vacancy rate was 0.9% and the rental vacancy rate was 7.7%.

Racial composition as of the 2020 census
| Race | Number | Percent |
|---|---|---|
| White | 1,659 | 56.3% |
| Black or African American | 14 | 0.5% |
| American Indian and Alaska Native | 76 | 2.6% |
| Asian | 7 | 0.2% |
| Native Hawaiian and Other Pacific Islander | 3 | 0.1% |
| Some other race | 484 | 16.4% |
| Two or more races | 703 | 23.9% |
| Hispanic or Latino (of any race) | 1,698 | 57.6% |

== Education ==
It is in the Los Lunas Public Schools school district.
