= Monterey Park =

Monterey Park may refer to:

== Canada ==
- Monterey Park, Calgary, Alberta, a neighbourhood

== United States ==
- Monterey Park, California, a city in Los Angeles County in Southern California
  - Monterey Park Hospital
- Monterey Park Tract, California, a census-designated place in Stanislaus County, California
- Monterey Park, New Mexico, a census-designated place
