= Tome-Adelino, New Mexico =

Unincorporated community in New Mexico, United States

- Former Census-designated place (CDP)
- Location of Tome-Adelino, New Mexico

- Location in the United States
- Coordinates: 34°43′44″N 106°43′11″W
- Country: United States
- State: New Mexico
- County: Valencia

Area
  - Total: 6.1 sq mi (15.7 km^{2})
  - Land: 6.1 sq mi (15.7 km^{2})
  - Water: 0 sq mi (0.0 km^{2})

Population (2000)
  - Total: 2,211
  - Density: 365/sq mi (141.1/km^{2})
- Time zone: UTC-7 (Mountain (MST))
  - Summer (DST): UTC-6 (MDT)
- Area code: 505
- FIPS code: 35-78685

Tome-Adelino is a former census-designated place (CDP) in Valencia County, New Mexico, United States. The population was 2,211 at the 2000 census. It is part of the Albuquerque Metropolitan Statistical Area. For the 2010 census, the CDP was split into the census-designated places of Tome and Adelino.

== Geography ==
Tome-Adelino is located at 34°43′44″N 106°43′11″W (34.728771, −106.719736).

According to the United States Census Bureau, the CDP has a total area of 6.1 square miles (16 km^{2}), all of it land.

== Demographics ==
As of the census of 2000, there were 2,211 people, 780 households, and 613 families residing in the CDP. The population density was 365.5 inhabitants per square mile (141.1/km^{2}). There were 830 housing units at an average density of 137.2 per square mile (53.0/km^{2}). The racial makeup of the CDP was 62.37% White, 0.32% African American, 1.31% Native American, 0.23% Asian, 0.05% Pacific Islander, 31.12% from other races, and 4.61% from two or more races. Hispanic or Latino of any race were 63.36% of the population.

There were 780 households, out of which 40.6% had children under the age of 18 living with them, 59.2% were married couples living together, 14.4% had a female householder with no husband present, and 21.3% were non-families. 16.8% of all households were made up of individuals, and 5.4% had someone living alone who was 65 years of age or older. The average household size was 2.83 and the average family size was 3.18.

In the CDP, the population was spread out, with 28.1% under the age of 18, 8.1% from 18 to 24, 29.9% from 25 to 44, 24.4% from 45 to 64, and 9.5% who were 65 years of age or older. The median age was 36 years. For every 100 females, there were 101.4 males. For every 100 females age 18 and over, there were 95.4 males.

The median income for a household in the CDP was $27,361, and the median income for a family was $32,708. Males had a median income of $25,321 versus $31,875 for females. The per capita income for the CDP was $14,871. About 15.4% of families and 18.6% of the population were below the poverty line, including 27.5% of those under age 18 and 12.9% of those age 65 or over.

== Education ==
The community's public schools are operated by Los Lunas Schools. There is a University of New Mexico Valencia Campus branch located just south of Tome' Hill.
