= Highland Meadows, New Mexico =

Census-designated place in Valencia County, New Mexico, United States

- Census-designated place
- Location within New Mexico
- Coordinates: 34°56′24″N 107°09′56″W
- Country: United States
- State: New Mexico
- County: Valencia

Area
  - Total: 6.93 sq mi (17.94 km^{2})
  - Land: 6.93 sq mi (17.94 km^{2})
  - Water: 0 sq mi (0.00 km^{2})
- Elevation: 5,492 ft (1,674 m)

Population (2020)
  - Total: 568
  - Density: 82.0/sq mi (31.67/km^{2})
- Time zone: UTC-7 (Mountain (MST))
  - Summer (DST): UTC-6 (MDT)
- Area code: 505
- GNIS feature ID: 2584410

Highland Meadows is a census-designated place in Valencia County, New Mexico, United States. As of the 2020 census, Highland Meadows had a population of 568.

== Geography ==
According to the U.S. Census Bureau, the community has an area of 7.016 square miles (18.17 km^{2}); 7.014 square miles (18.17 km^{2}) is land, and 0.002 square miles (0.0052 km^{2}) is water.

== Demographics ==
Historical population
Census	Pop.	Note	%±
2020	568		—
U.S. Decennial Census

== Education ==
It is in the Los Lunas Public Schools school district.

== See also ==
- List of census-designated places in New Mexico
