= Chical, New Mexico =

- census-designated place
- Location within New Mexico
- Coordinates: 34°52′20″N 106°40′05″W
- Country: United States
- State: New Mexico
- County: Valencia

Area
  - Total: 0.81 sq mi (2.10 km^{2})
  - Land: 0.81 sq mi (2.10 km^{2})
  - Water: 0 sq mi (0.00 km^{2})
- Elevation: 4,922 ft (1,500 m)

Population (2020)
  - Total: 124
  - Density: 152.9/sq mi (59.05/km^{2})
- Time zone: UTC-7 (Mountain (MST))
  - Summer (DST): UTC-6 (MDT)
- Area code: 505
- GNIS feature ID: 2584075

Chical is a census-designated place in Valencia County, New Mexico, United States. As of the 2020 census, Chical had a population of 124.

== Geography ==
According to the U.S. Census Bureau, the community has an area of 0.826 square miles (2.14 km^{2}), all land.

== Demographics ==
Historical population
Census	Pop.	Note	%±
2020	124		—
U.S. Decennial Census

== Education ==
It is in the Los Lunas Public Schools school district.
