= Monterey Park, New Mexico =

- Census-designated place
- Location within New Mexico
- Coordinates: 34°44′56″N 106°39′16″W
- Country: United States
- State: New Mexico
- County: Valencia

Area
  - Total: 2.64 sq mi (6.85 km^{2})
  - Land: 2.64 sq mi (6.85 km^{2})
  - Water: 0 sq mi (0.00 km^{2})
- Elevation: 5,023 ft (1,531 m)

Population (2020)
  - Total: 1,272
  - Density: 481/sq mi (185.7/km^{2})
- Time zone: UTC-7 (Mountain (MST))
  - Summer (DST): UTC-6 (MDT)
- GNIS feature ID: 2630011

Monterey Park is a census-designated place in Valencia County, New Mexico, United States. As of the 2020 census, Monterey Park had a population of 1,272. It is part of the Albuquerque Metropolitan Statistical Area.

The U.S. Census Bureau previously considered Monterey Park and the neighboring community of El Cerro Mission to be a single CDP, El Cerro-Monterey Park. The CDP was split prior to the 2010 Census.

== Demographics ==
Historical population
Census	Pop.	Note	%±
2020	1,272		—
U.S. Decennial Census

== Education ==
It is in the Los Lunas Public Schools school district.
