= Valencia County, New Mexico =

County in New Mexico, United States

- County
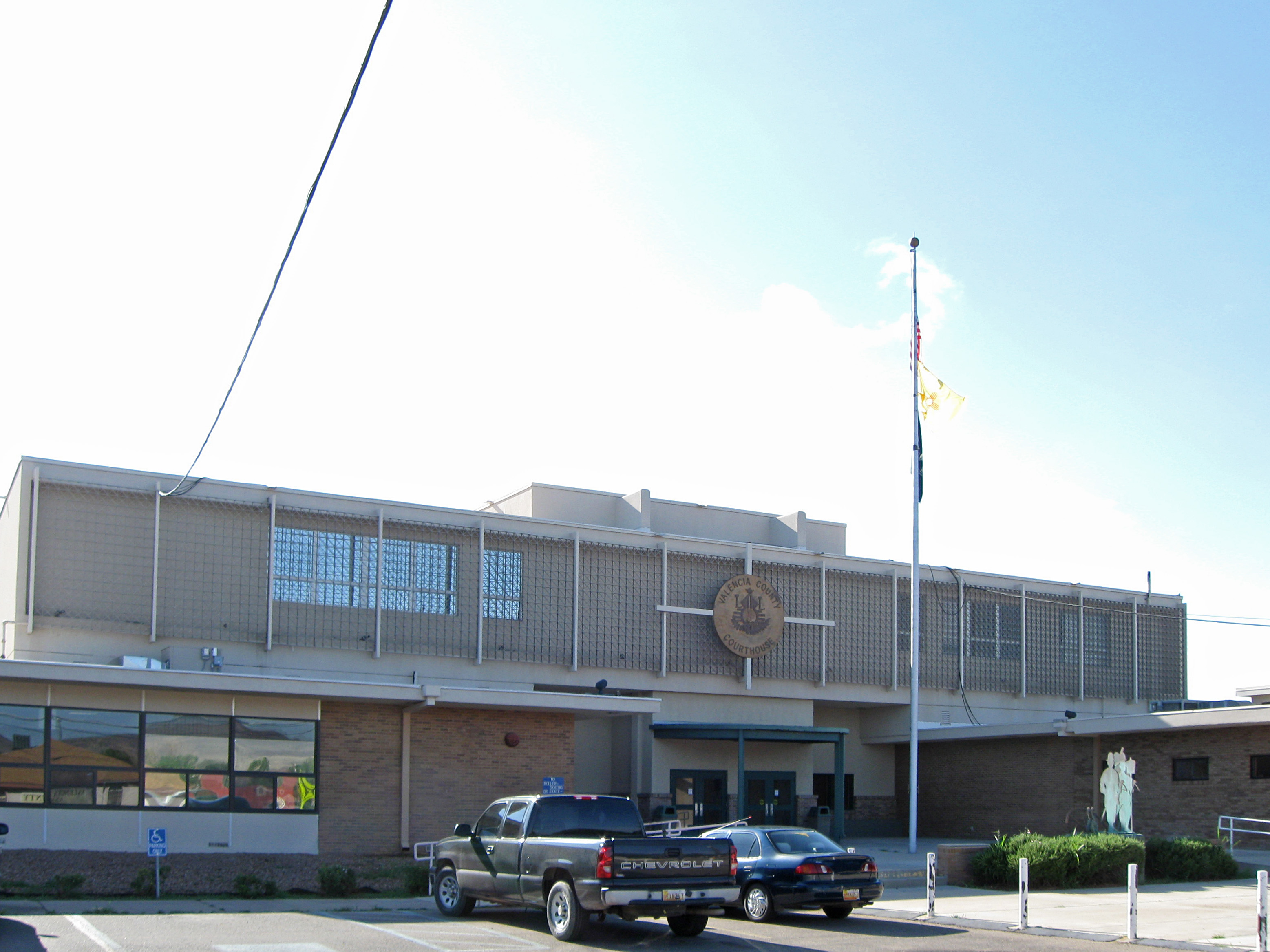
- Valencia County Courthouse in Los Lunas

- Location within the U.S. state of New Mexico
- Coordinates: 34°43′N 106°48′W
- Country: United States
- State: New Mexico
- Founded: January 9, 1852
- Named for: Valencia, New Mexico
- Seat: Los Lunas
- Largest village: Los Lunas

Area
  - Total: 1,068 sq mi (2,770 km^{2})
  - Land: 1,066 sq mi (2,760 km^{2})
  - Water: 2.1 sq mi (5.4 km^{2}) 0.2%

Population (2020)
  - Total: 76,205
  - Estimate (2025): 82,013 ▲
  - Density: 71.49/sq mi (27.60/km^{2})
- Time zone: UTC−7 (Mountain)
  - Summer (DST): UTC−6 (MDT)
- Congressional districts: 1st, 2nd
- Website: www.valencianm.gov

Valencia County (Spanish: Condado de Valencia) is a county in the U.S. state of New Mexico. As of the 2020 census, the population was 76,205. The county seat is Los Lunas.

Valencia County is included in the Albuquerque Metropolitan Statistical Area.

The county was a significant bellwether region that held the longest record for predicting presidential election winners until 2020.

== History ==
The county, which had been previously larger in area, lost almost 81 percent of its territory on June 19, 1981, upon the creation of Cibola County, which occupies the westernmost portion of Valencia County's former area.

== Geography ==
According to the U.S. Census Bureau, the county has a total area of 1,068 square miles (2,770 km^{2}), of which 1,066 square miles (2,760 km^{2}) is land and 2.1 square miles (5.4 km^{2}) (0.2%) is water. It is the second-smallest county in New Mexico by area.

=== Adjacent counties ===
- Bernalillo County - north
- Torrance County - east
- Socorro County - south
- Cibola County - west

=== National protected areas ===
- Cibola National Forest (part)
- El Camino Real de Tierra Adentro National Historic Trail (part)
- Manzano Wilderness (part)

=== Other protected areas ===
- Whitfield Wildlife Conservation Area, est. 2003

== Demographics ==
Historical population
Census	Pop.	Note	%±
1850	14,189		—
1860	11,321		−20.2%
1870	9,093		−19.7%
1880	13,095		44.0%
1890	13,876		6.0%
1900	13,895		0.1%
1910	13,320		−4.1%
1920	13,795		3.6%
1930	16,186		17.3%
1940	20,245		25.1%
1950	22,481		11.0%
1960	39,085		73.9%
1970	40,539		3.7%
1980	61,115		50.8%
1990	45,235		−26.0%
2000	66,152		46.2%
2010	76,569		15.7%
2020	76,205		−0.5%
2025 (est.)	82,013	▲	7.6%
U.S. Decennial Census; 1790–1960 1900–1990; 1990–2000 2010

=== 2020 census ===
As of the 2020 census, the county had a population of 76,205. The median age was 39.8 years, 23.7% of residents were under the age of 18, and 18.3% of residents were 65 years of age or older. For every 100 females there were 101.8 males, and for every 100 females age 18 and over there were 100.4 males age 18 and over.

Valencia County, New Mexico – Racial and ethnic composition Note: the US Census treats Hispanic/Latino as an ethnic category. This table excludes Latinos from the racial categories and assigns them to a separate category. Hispanics/Latinos may be of any race.
Race / Ethnicity (NH = Non-Hispanic)	Pop 2000	Pop 2010	Pop 2020	% 2000	% 2010	% 2020
White alone (NH)	26,087	27,734	24,651	39.43%	36.22%	32.35%
Black or African American alone (NH)	699	839	747	1.06%	1.10%	0.98%
Native American or Alaska Native alone (NH)	1,710	2,117	2,353	2.58%	2.76%	3.09%
Asian alone (NH)	188	314	341	0.28%	0.41%	0.45%
Pacific Islander alone (NH)	23	32	32	0.03%	0.04%	0.04%
Other race alone (NH)	94	122	447	0.14%	0.16%	0.59%
Mixed race or Multiracial (NH)	980	806	1,859	1.48%	1.05%	2.44%
Hispanic or Latino (any race)	36,371	44,605	45,775	54.98%	58.25%	60.07%
Total	66,152	76,569	76,205	100.00%	100.00%	100.00%

The racial makeup of the county was 51.8% White, 1.3% Black or African American, 4.3% American Indian and Alaska Native, 0.6% Asian, 0.1% Native Hawaiian and Pacific Islander, 18.7% from some other race, and 23.4% from two or more races. Hispanic or Latino residents of any race comprised 60.1% of the population.

70.0% of residents lived in urban areas, while 30.0% lived in rural areas.

There were 27,756 households in the county, of which 33.0% had children under the age of 18 living with them and 26.2% had a female householder with no spouse or partner present. About 24.2% of all households were made up of individuals and 11.4% had someone living alone who was 65 years of age or older.

There were 29,929 housing units, of which 7.3% were vacant. Among occupied housing units, 79.2% were owner-occupied and 20.8% were renter-occupied. The homeowner vacancy rate was 1.4% and the rental vacancy rate was 7.3%.

=== 2010 census ===
As of the 2010 census, there were 76,569 people, 27,500 households, and 19,967 families living in the county. The population density was 71.8 inhabitants per square mile (27.7/km^{2}). There were 30,085 housing units at an average density of 28.2 per square mile (10.9/km^{2}). The racial makeup of the county was 73.2% white, 3.8% American Indian, 1.4% black or African American, 0.5% Asian, 0.1% Pacific islander, 17.0% from other races, and 4.0% from two or more races. Those of Hispanic or Latino origin made up 58.3% of the population. In terms of ancestry, 10.9% were German, 6.7% were English, 6.1% were Irish, and 4.2% were American.

Of the 27,500 households, 37.1% had children under the age of 18 living with them, 51.8% were married couples living together, 13.9% had a female householder with no husband present, 27.4% were non-families, and 22.1% of all households were made up of individuals. The average household size was 2.73 and the average family size was 3.18. The median age was 37.7 years.

The median income for a household in the county was $42,044 and the median income for a family was $48,767. Males had a median income of $41,511 versus $32,584 for females. The per capita income for the county was $19,955. About 15.7% of families and 19.4% of the population were below the poverty line, including 29.7% of those under age 18 and 12.5% of those age 65 or over.

=== 2000 census ===
As of the 2000 census, there were 66,152 people, 22,681 households, and 17,350 families living in the county. The population density was 62 people per square mile (24 people/km^{2}). There were 24,643 housing units at an average density of 23 per square mile (8.9/km^{2}). The racial makeup of the county was 66.5% White, 1.3% Black or African American, 3.3% Native American, 0.4% Asian, 0.1% Pacific Islander, 23.9% from other races, and 4.6% from two or more races. 55.0% of the population were Hispanic or Latino of any race.

There were 22,681 households, out of which 39.6% had children under the age of 18 living with them, 57.2% were married couples living together, 13.1% had a female householder with no husband present, and 23.5% were non-families. 18.8% of all households were made up of individuals, and 6.4% had someone living alone who was 65 years of age or older. The average household size was 2.86 and the average family size was 3.25.

In the county, the population was spread out, with 30.1% under the age of 18, 8.4% from 18 to 24, 29.6% from 25 to 44, 21.7% from 45 to 64, and 10.2% who were 65 years of age or older. The median age was 34 years. For every 100 females there were 100.70 males. For every 100 females age 18 and over, there were 99.10 males.

The median income for a household in the county was $34,099, and the median income for a family was $37,157. Males had a median income of $30,339 versus $23,132 for females. The per capita income for the county was $14,747. About 13.5% of families and 16.8% of the population were below the poverty line, including 22.3% of those under age 18 and 10.8% of those age 65 or over.

== Communities ==
=== Cities ===
- Belen
- Rio Communities

=== Town ===
- Peralta

=== Villages ===
- Bosque Farms
- Los Lunas (county seat)

=== Census-designated places ===
- Adelino
- Casa Colorada
- Chical
- El Cerro
- El Cerro Mission
- Highland Meadows
- Jarales
- Las Maravillas
- Los Chavez
- Madrone
- Meadow Lake
- Monterey Park
- Pueblitos
- Sausal
- Tomé
- Valencia

=== Unincorporated communities ===
- Bosque
- Los Trujillos-Gabaldon
- Rio Communities North
- Tome-Adelino

== Education ==
Valencia County has two school districts: Belén Consolidated Schools and Los Lunas Public Schools.

== Transportation ==
=== Major highways ===
- I-25 / US 85 (unsigned)
  - I-25 BL (Belen)
- NM 6
- NM 47
- NM 109
- NM 116
- NM 263
- NM 304
- NM 309
- NM 314
- NM 346

=== Public transit ===
The commuter rail service, New Mexico Rail Runner Express begins at its southern terminus in Belen, continuing north to Albuquerque and Santa Fe.

== Notable people ==
- Bo Diddley lived in Valencia County from 1971 to 1978, while continuing his musical career. He served for two and a half years as a deputy sheriff in the Valencia County Citizens' Patrol; during that time he purchased and donated three highway-patrol pursuit cars. He occasionally played local dances.
- Brian Reynolds Myers, lived in Valencia County during the late 1990s

== Politics ==
Valencia County once held the longest active streak of voting for the winner of U.S. presidential elections, breaking for the nationwide winner in every presidential election from 1952 to 2016. In 2020, both it and Vigo County, Indiana broke their streaks dating back to the 1950s (since 1956 in Vigo) by selecting Donald Trump over eventual winner Joe Biden, then leaving Clallam County, Washington, whose streak extends back to 1980 (but would later have its own streak broken, when it backed the losing candidate in Kamala Harris over Trump in 2024), as the holder of longest-running presidential bellwether. Before 1952, its record is less reliable; the only other Democratic president it voted for was Franklin D. Roosevelt in 1936. The county has seen a steady Republican trend in recent elections, with Donald Trump's 2024 performance being the best by a Republican presidential candidate since 1984.

United States presidential election results for Valencia County, New Mexico
Year	Republican		Democratic		Third party(ies)	
Year	No.	%	No.	%	No.	%
1912	1,263	77.25%	231	14.13%	141	8.62%
1916	1,540	79.50%	383	19.77%	14	0.72%
1920	2,839	74.59%	951	24.99%	16	0.42%
1924	3,183	78.01%	678	16.62%	219	5.37%
1928	3,500	79.87%	881	20.10%	1	0.02%
1932	3,263	59.25%	2,229	40.48%	15	0.27%
1936	2,941	46.75%	3,336	53.03%	14	0.22%
1940	3,436	50.83%	3,318	49.08%	6	0.09%
1944	2,765	52.88%	2,461	47.06%	3	0.06%
1948	3,280	52.67%	2,914	46.80%	33	0.53%
1952	3,810	53.47%	3,310	46.46%	5	0.07%
1956	4,663	56.74%	3,547	43.16%	8	0.10%
1960	4,929	41.16%	7,043	58.81%	4	0.03%
1964	3,950	33.60%	7,757	65.98%	50	0.43%
1968	5,676	47.51%	5,513	46.15%	758	6.34%
1972	8,239	56.09%	6,110	41.60%	339	2.31%
1976	7,851	47.43%	8,566	51.75%	136	0.82%
1980	11,177	58.39%	6,886	35.97%	1,079	5.64%
1984	8,474	60.32%	5,393	38.39%	182	1.30%
1988	7,874	51.80%	7,136	46.95%	190	1.25%
1992	6,305	37.60%	7,495	44.70%	2,968	17.70%
1996	7,779	41.95%	9,169	49.44%	1,597	8.61%
2000	10,803	50.54%	9,819	45.93%	755	3.53%
2004	14,474	55.64%	11,270	43.33%	268	1.03%
2008	13,136	45.45%	15,366	53.17%	397	1.37%
2012	12,825	46.25%	13,511	48.73%	1,392	5.02%
2016	13,215	47.89%	10,841	39.29%	3,536	12.82%
2020	17,364	53.80%	14,263	44.19%	650	2.01%
2024	19,057	57.27%	13,609	40.90%	611	1.84%

== See also ==
- National Register of Historic Places listings in Valencia County, New Mexico
