= Meadow Lake, New Mexico =

- CDP
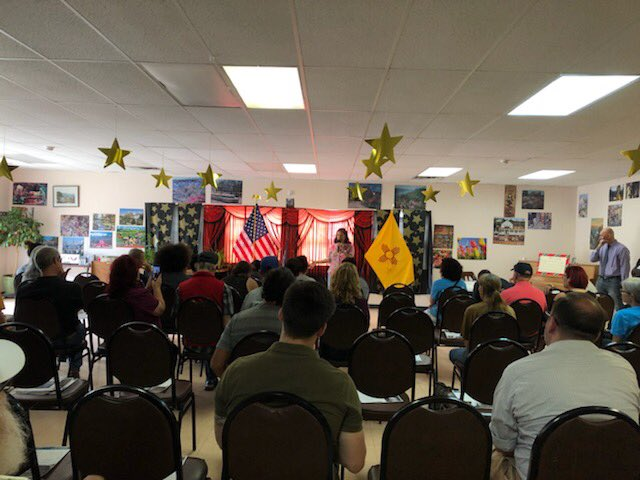
- Deb Haaland hosting a town hall in Meadow Lake in 2019

- Location of Meadow Lake, New Mexico

- Location in the United States
- Coordinates: 34°48′16″N 106°34′15″W
- Country: United States
- State: New Mexico
- County: Valencia

Area
  - Total: 11.56 sq mi (29.95 km^{2})
  - Land: 11.54 sq mi (29.89 km^{2})
  - Water: 0.023 sq mi (0.06 km^{2})
- Elevation: 5,309 ft (1,618 m)

Population (2020)
  - Total: 4,573
  - Density: 396.2/sq mi (152.98/km^{2})
- Time zone: UTC-7 (Mountain (MST))
  - Summer (DST): UTC-6 (MDT)
- Area code: 505
- FIPS code: 35-47220
- GNIS feature ID: 2408807

Meadow Lake is a census-designated place (CDP) in Valencia County, New Mexico, United States. As of the 2020 census, Meadow Lake had a population of 4,573. It is part of the Albuquerque Metropolitan Statistical Area.

== Geography ==
According to the United States Census Bureau, the CDP has a total area of 9.7 square miles (25 km^{2}), of which 9.6 square miles (25 km^{2}) is land and 0.10% is water.

== Demographics ==
Historical population
Census	Pop.	Note	%±
2020	4,573		—
U.S. Decennial Census

=== 2020 census ===
As of the 2020 census, Meadow Lake had a population of 4,573. The median age was 33.0 years. 30.3% of residents were under the age of 18 and 11.4% of residents were 65 years of age or older. For every 100 females there were 104.2 males, and for every 100 females age 18 and over there were 101.5 males age 18 and over.

0.0% of residents lived in urban areas, while 100.0% lived in rural areas.

There were 1,441 households in Meadow Lake, of which 43.6% had children under the age of 18 living in them. Of all households, 42.5% were married-couple households, 22.1% were households with a male householder and no spouse or partner present, and 26.0% were households with a female householder and no spouse or partner present. About 22.2% of all households were made up of individuals and 9.9% had someone living alone who was 65 years of age or older.

There were 1,606 housing units, of which 10.3% were vacant. The homeowner vacancy rate was 1.3% and the rental vacancy rate was 7.7%.

Racial composition as of the 2020 census
Race	Number	Percent
White	1,768	38.7%
Black or African American	33	0.7%
American Indian and Alaska Native	149	3.3%
Asian	16	0.3%
Native Hawaiian and Other Pacific Islander	2	0.0%
Some other race	1,339	29.3%
Two or more races	1,266	27.7%
Hispanic or Latino (of any race)	3,413	74.6%

=== 2000 census ===
As of the census of 2000, there were 4,491 people, 1,339 households, and 1,084 families residing in the CDP. The population density was 465.3 inhabitants per square mile (179.7/km^{2}). There were 1,543 housing units at an average density of 159.9 per square mile (61.7/km^{2}). The racial makeup of the CDP was 54.02% White, 1.27% African American, 4.07% Native American, 0.36% Asian, 0.07% Pacific Islander, 33.60% from other races, and 6.61% from two or more races. Hispanic or Latino of any race were 57.89% of the population.

There were 1,339 households, out of which 53.7% had children under the age of 18 living with them, 55.9% were married couples living together, 16.5% had a female householder with no husband present, and 19.0% were non-families. 13.5% of all households were made up of individuals, and 3.4% had someone living alone who was 65 years of age or older. The average household size was 3.35 and the average family size was 3.67.

In the CDP, the population was spread out, with 38.1% under the age of 18, 8.7% from 18 to 24, 33.2% from 25 to 44, 15.7% from 45 to 64, and 4.4% who were 65 years of age or older. The median age was 27 years. For every 100 females, there were 99.9 males. For every 100 females age 18 and over, there were 98.2 males.

The median income for a household in the CDP was $25,561, and the median income for a family was $27,296. Males had a median income of $23,598 versus $20,469 for females. The per capita income for the CDP was $10,808. About 21.9% of families and 24.4% of the population were below the poverty line, including 30.6% of those under age 18 and 21.3% of those age 65 or over.

== Education ==
The community's public schools are operated by Los Lunas Schools.
