= Rio Communities North, New Mexico =

- CDP
- Location of Rio Communities North, New Mexico

- Location in the United States
- Coordinates: 34°43′58″N 106°41′16″W
- Country: United States
- State: New Mexico
- County: Valencia

Area
  - Total: 4.7 sq mi (12.3 km^{2})
  - Land: 4.7 sq mi (12.3 km^{2})
  - Water: 0 sq mi (0.0 km^{2})
- Elevation: 4,997 ft (1,523 m)

Population (2000)
  - Total: 1,588
  - Density: 335/sq mi (129.4/km^{2})
- Time zone: UTC-7 (Mountain (MST))
  - Summer (DST): UTC-6 (MDT)
- Area code: 505
- FIPS code: 35-63156
- GNIS feature ID: 2409172

Rio Communities North is a census-designated place (CDP) in Valencia County, New Mexico, United States. The population was 1,588 at the 2000 census. It is part of the Albuquerque Metropolitan Statistical Area.

== Geography ==
According to the United States Census Bureau, the CDP has a total area of 4.7 square miles (12 km^{2}), all land.

== Demographics ==
As of the census of 2000, there were 1,588 people, 550 households, and 451 families residing in the CDP. The population density was 335.3 inhabitants per square mile (129.5/km^{2}). There were 591 housing units at an average density of 124.8 per square mile (48.2/km^{2}). The racial makeup of the CDP was 70.09% White, 1.83% African American, 1.95% Native American, 0.88% Asian, 20.40% from other races, and 4.85% from two or more races. Hispanic or Latino of any race were 43.70% of the population.

There were 550 households, out of which 47.3% had children under the age of 18 living with them, 70.9% were married couples living together, 7.1% had a female householder with no husband present, and 18.0% were non-families. 12.5% of all households were made up of individuals, and 2.7% had someone living alone who was 65 years of age or older. The average household size was 2.89 and the average family size was 3.16.

In the CDP, the population was spread out, with 32.0% under the age of 18, 6.5% from 18 to 24, 37.0% from 25 to 44, 17.7% from 45 to 64, and 6.7% who were 65 years of age or older. The median age was 31 years. For every 100 females, there were 99.7 males. For every 100 females age 18 and over, there were 96.4 males.

The median income for a household in the CDP was $46,773, and the median income for a family was $46,471. Males had a median income of $40,685 versus $25,536 for females. The per capita income for the CDP was $17,745. About 2.8% of families and 3.9% of the population were below the poverty line, including 4.2% of those under age 18 and 5.2% of those age 65 or over.
