= El Cerro Mission, New Mexico =

- CDP
- Location within New Mexico
- Coordinates: 34°46′05″N 106°37′50″W
- Country: United States
- State: New Mexico
- County: Valencia

Area
  - Total: 5.88 sq mi (15.24 km^{2})
  - Land: 5.88 sq mi (15.24 km^{2})
  - Water: 0 sq mi (0.00 km^{2})
- Elevation: 5,053 ft (1,540 m)

Population (2020)
  - Total: 4,566
  - Density: 776.1/sq mi (299.67/km^{2})
- Time zone: UTC-7 (Mountain (MST))
  - Summer (DST): UTC-6 (MDT)
- Area code: 505
- FIPS code: 35-22582
- GNIS feature ID: 2652546

El Cerro Mission is a census-designated place (CDP) in Valencia County, New Mexico, United States. As of the 2020 census, El Cerro Mission had a population of 4,566. It is part of the Albuquerque Metropolitan Statistical Area.

The U.S. Census Bureau previously considered El Cerro Mission and the neighboring community of Monterey Park to be a single CDP, El Cerro-Monterey Park. The CDP was split prior to the 2010 Census.

== Geography ==
According to the United States Census Bureau, the CDP has a total area of 5.9 square miles (15 km^{2}), all land.

== Demographics ==
Historical population
Census	Pop.	Note	%±
2020	4,566		—
U.S. Decennial Census

=== 2020 census ===
As of the 2020 census, El Cerro Mission had a population of 4,566. The median age was 32.7 years. 30.5% of residents were under the age of 18 and 10.3% of residents were 65 years of age or older. For every 100 females there were 99.1 males, and for every 100 females age 18 and over there were 100.9 males age 18 and over.

82.7% of residents lived in urban areas, while 17.3% lived in rural areas.

There were 1,437 households in El Cerro Mission, of which 43.0% had children under the age of 18 living in them. Of all households, 49.2% were married-couple households, 20.1% were households with a male householder and no spouse or partner present, and 22.6% were households with a female householder and no spouse or partner present. About 19.0% of all households were made up of individuals and 6.7% had someone living alone who was 65 years of age or older.

There were 1,524 housing units, of which 5.7% were vacant. The homeowner vacancy rate was 1.0% and the rental vacancy rate was 8.6%.

Racial composition as of the 2020 census
Race	Number	Percent
White	1,839	40.3%
Black or African American	33	0.7%
American Indian and Alaska Native	194	4.2%
Asian	8	0.2%
Native Hawaiian and Other Pacific Islander	7	0.2%
Some other race	1,210	26.5%
Two or more races	1,275	27.9%
Hispanic or Latino (of any race)	3,343	73.2%

=== 2010 census ===
As of the 2010 census, there were 4,657 people, 1,406 households, and 1,101 families residing in the CDP. The population density was 791.9 inhabitants per square mile (305.8/km^{2}). There were 1,556 housing units at an average density of 264.6 units per square mile (102.2 units/km^{2}). The racial makeup of the CDP was 59.7% White, 0.8% African American, 3.6% Native American, 0.8% Asian, 0.0% Pacific Islander, 30.9% from other races, and 4.3% from two or more races. Hispanic or Latino of any race were 72.5% of the population.

There were 1,406 households, out of which 51.3% had children under the age of 18 living with them, 55.8% were married couples living together, 12.8% had a female householder with no husband present, and 21.7% were non-families. 15.7% of all households were made up of individuals, and 2.8% had someone living alone who was 65 years of age or older. The average household size was 3.31 and the average family size was 3.71.

== Education ==
The community's public schools are operated by Los Lunas Schools.
