= Bosque Farms, New Mexico =

Village in Valencia County, New Mexico, United States

- Village
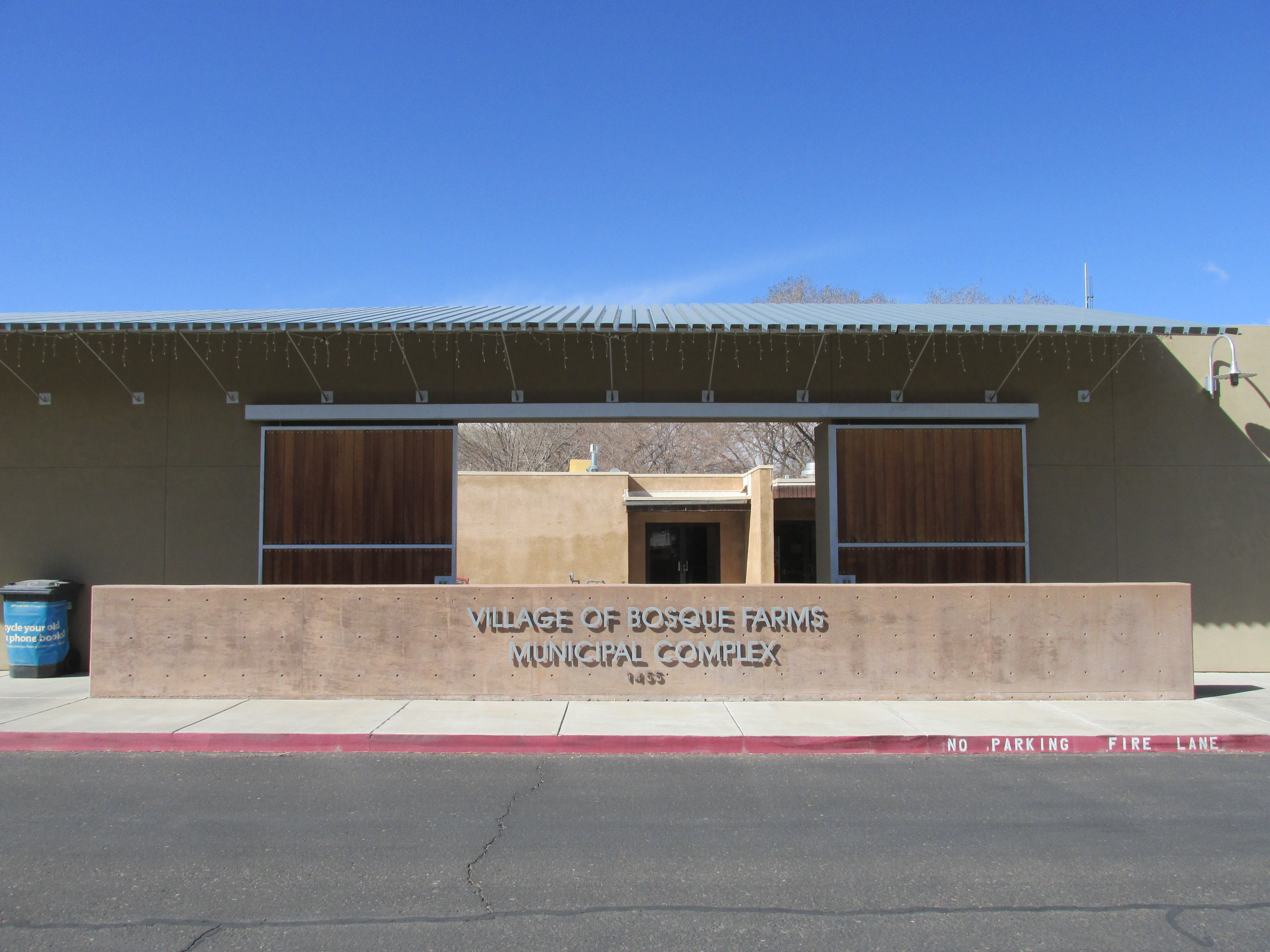
- Municipal Complex, February 2013

- Location of Bosque Farms, New Mexico

- Location in the United States
- Coordinates: 34°51′14″N 106°42′04″W
- Country: United States
- State: New Mexico
- County: Valencia

Government
  - Mayor: Russell Walkup

Area
  - Total: 3.93 sq mi (10.19 km^{2})
  - Land: 3.93 sq mi (10.19 km^{2})
  - Water: 0 sq mi (0.00 km^{2})
- Elevation: 4,866 ft (1,483 m)

Population (2020)
  - Total: 4,020
  - Density: 1,021.6/sq mi (394.44/km^{2})
- Time zone: UTC-7 (Mountain (MST))
  - Summer (DST): UTC-6 (MDT)
- ZIP codes: 87042, 87068
- Area code: 505
- FIPS code: 35-08580
- GNIS feature ID: 2413534
- Website: bosquefarmsnm.gov

Bosque Farms is a village in Valencia County, New Mexico, United States. The population was 4,020 in the 2020 census. It is part of the Albuquerque Metropolitan Statistical Area.

== History ==
What is known as Bosque Farms today was part of a Spanish land grant dating from 1716, originally known as Bosque del Pino (Forest Pines), or Los Pinos.

The land changed hands numerous times before being purchased during the Great Depression by the New Mexico Rural Rehabilitation Corporation, which in turn sold it to the federal Resettlement Administration in 1935. The RA renamed the land Bosque Farms and turned it into an agricultural resettlement project for Dust Bowl refugees. Traditional farming failed due to poor soil conditions, and the families who stayed turned to dairy farming, which became the community's main agricultural industry through the 1960s.

Bosque Farms was incorporated in 1974. Today, housing and commercial development are its main sources of revenue.

== Geography ==
According to the United States Census Bureau, the village has a total area of 4.0 square miles (10 km^{2}), all land.

== Demographics ==
Historical population
Census	Pop.	Note	%±
1980	3,353		—
1990	3,791		13.1%
2000	3,931		3.7%
2010	3,904		−0.7%
2020	4,020		3.0%
U.S. Decennial Census

=== 2020 census ===
As of the 2020 census, Bosque Farms had a population of 4,020. The median age was 48.3 years. 20.3% of residents were under the age of 18 and 25.0% of residents were 65 years of age or older. For every 100 females there were 97.7 males, and for every 100 females age 18 and over there were 96.0 males age 18 and over.

99.1% of residents lived in urban areas, while 0.9% lived in rural areas.

There were 1,560 households in Bosque Farms, of which 28.8% had children under the age of 18 living in them. Of all households, 56.2% were married-couple households, 16.6% were households with a male householder and no spouse or partner present, and 20.9% were households with a female householder and no spouse or partner present. About 20.3% of all households were made up of individuals and 12.5% had someone living alone who was 65 years of age or older.

There were 1,635 housing units, of which 4.6% were vacant. The homeowner vacancy rate was 1.0% and the rental vacancy rate was 4.2%.

Racial composition as of the 2020 census
Race	Number	Percent
White	2,567	63.9%
Black or African American	22	0.5%
American Indian and Alaska Native	158	3.9%
Asian	17	0.4%
Native Hawaiian and Other Pacific Islander	0	0.0%
Some other race	463	11.5%
Two or more races	793	19.7%
Hispanic or Latino (of any race)	1,701	42.3%

=== 2000 census ===
As of the 2000 census, there were 3,931 people, 1,422 households, and 1,126 families residing in the village. The population density was 996.2 inhabitants per square mile (384.6/km^{2}). There were 1,476 housing units at an average density of 374.0 per square mile (144.4/km^{2}). The racial makeup of the village was 82.68% White, 0.61% African American, 1.88% Native American, 0.20% Asian, 11.19% from other races, and 3.43% from two or more races. Hispanic or Latino of any race were 29.53% of the population.

There were 1,422 households, out of which 33.9% had children under the age of 18 living with them, 67.5% were married couples living together, 8.0% had a female householder with no husband present, and 20.8% were non-families. 16.5% of all households were made up of individuals, and 6.1% had someone living alone who was 65 years of age or older. The average household size was 2.76 and the average family size was 3.10.

In the village, the population was spread out, with 26.0% under the age of 18, 6.2% from 18 to 24, 25.4% from 25 to 44, 29.4% from 45 to 64, and 12.9% who were 65 years of age or older. The median age was 41 years. For every 100 females, there were 98.2 males. For every 100 females age 18 and over, there were 95.6 males.

The median income for a household in the village was $44,055, and the median income for a family was $49,688. Males had a median income of $40,963 versus $25,726 for females. The per capita income for the village was $20,317. About 4.8% of families and 7.7% of the population were below the poverty line, including 10.4% of those under age 18 and 2.1% of those age 65 or over.

== Education ==
Bosque Farms' public schools are operated by Los Lunas Schools.

In 2010, Bosque Farms Elementary won the National Blue Ribbon Award for its excellence in education and for progress in “closing achievement gaps among student subgroups.”

== Government ==
As of April 2020, the current mayor of Bosque Farms is Russell Walkup.
