= Valencia, Valencia County, New Mexico =

Valencia, New Mexico
- CDP
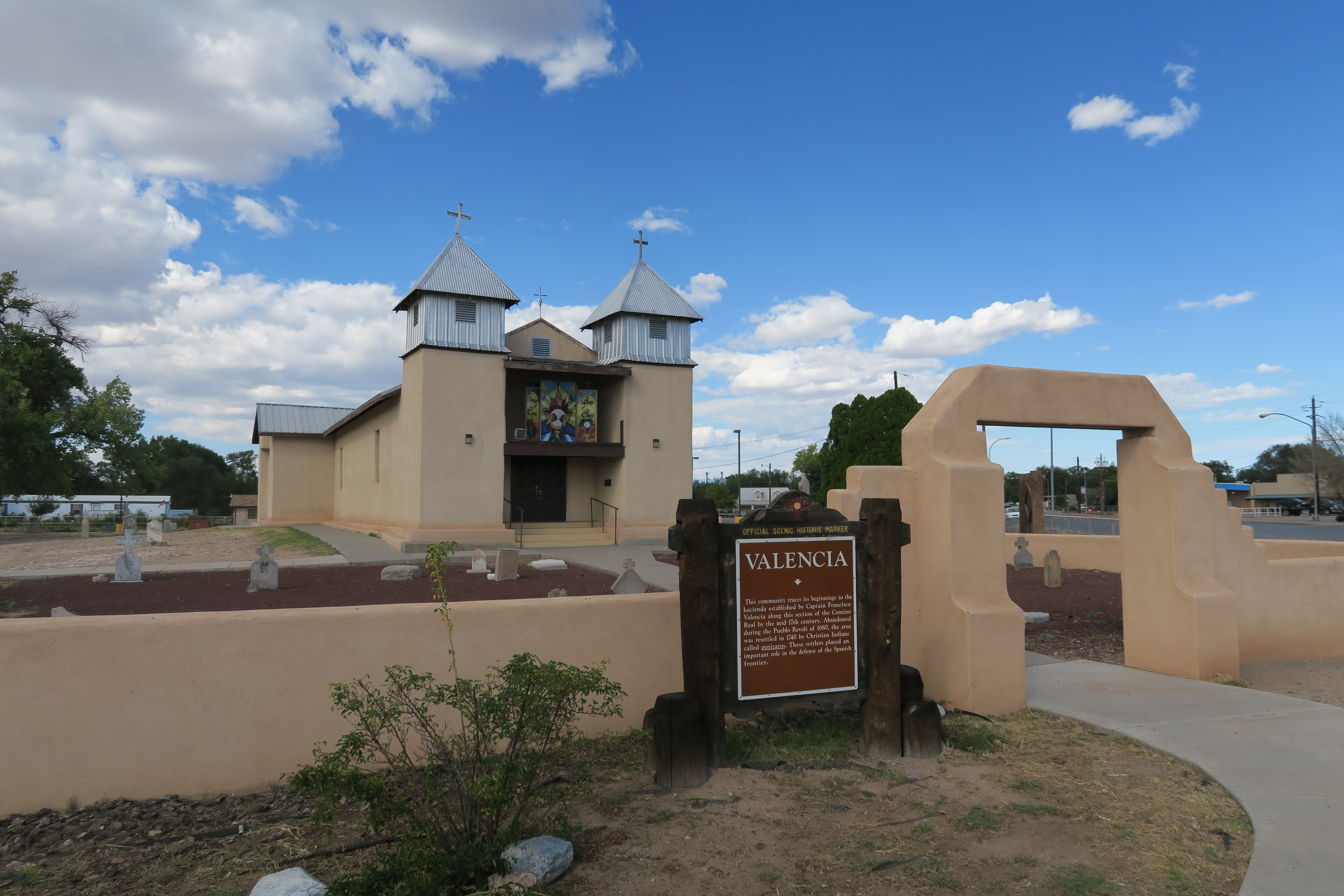
- Valencia historic marker

- Location of Valencia, New Mexico

- Location in the United States
- Coordinates: 34°48′19″N 106°41′13″W
- Country: United States
- State: New Mexico
- County: Valencia

Area
  - Total: 1.98 sq mi (5.14 km^{2})
  - Land: 1.98 sq mi (5.14 km^{2})
  - Water: 0 sq mi (0.00 km^{2})
- Elevation: 4,849 ft (1,478 m)

Population (2020)
  - Total: 2,052
  - Density: 1,034.4/sq mi (399.38/km^{2})
- Time zone: UTC-7 (Mountain (MST))
  - Summer (DST): UTC-6 (MDT)
- Area code: 505
- FIPS code: 35-81800
- GNIS feature ID: 2409390

Valencia is a census-designated place (CDP) in Valencia County, New Mexico, United States. The population was 2,192 according to the 2010 census. It is part of the Albuquerque Metropolitan Statistical Area.

== Geography ==
According to the United States Census Bureau, the CDP has a total area of 5.5 square miles (14 km^{2}), all land.

== Demographics ==
Historical population
| Census | Pop. | Note | %± |
|---|---|---|---|
| 1990 | 3,917 | | — |
| 2000 | 4,500 | | 14.9% |
| 2010 | 2,192 | | −51.3% |
| 2020 | 2,052 | | −6.4% |
U.S. Decennial Census

As of the census of 2000, there were 4,500 people, 1,553 households, and 1,248 families residing in the CDP. The population density was 819.4 inhabitants per square mile (316.4/km^{2}). There were 1,646 housing units at an average density of 299.7 per square mile (115.7/km^{2}). The racial makeup of the CDP was 68.87% White, 0.76% African American, 1.93% Native American, 0.67% Asian, 0.09% Pacific Islander, 23.07% from other races, and 4.62% from two or more races. Hispanic or Latino individuals of any race made up 49.67% of the population.

There were 1,553 households, of which 37.1% had children under the age of 18 living with them; 63.0% were married couples living together, 11.4% had a female householder with no husband present, and 19.6% were non-families. 15.4% of all households were made up of individuals, and 4.2% had someone living alone who was 65 years of age or older. The average household size was 2.87 and the average family size was 3.17.

In the CDP, the population was spread out, with 27.9% under the age of 18, 8.0% from 18 to 24, 28.5% from 25 to 44, 25.5% from 45 to 64, and 10.1% who were 65 years of age or older. The median age was 37 years. For every 100 females, there were 98.3 males. For every 100 females age 18 and over, there were 95.0 males.

The median income for a household in the CDP was $40,521, and the median family income was $47,745. Males had a median income of $38,939 versus $24,830 for females. The per capita income for the CDP was $16,620. About 8.5% of families and 12.0% of the population were below the poverty line, including 16.0% of those under age 18 and 9.9% of those age 65 or over.

== Education ==
The community's public schools are operated by Los Lunas Schools district.
