= Los Trujillos-Gabaldon, New Mexico =

- CDP
- Location of Los Trujillos-Gabaldon, New Mexico

- Location in the United States
- Coordinates: 34°39′47″N 106°45′21″W
- Country: United States
- State: New Mexico
- County: Valencia

Area
  - Total: 5.9 sq mi (15.4 km^{2})
  - Land: 5.9 sq mi (15.4 km^{2})
  - Water: 0 sq mi (0.0 km^{2})
- Elevation: 4,807 ft (1,465 m)

Population (2000)
  - Total: 2,166
  - Density: 365/sq mi (140.9/km^{2})
- Time zone: UTC-7 (Mountain (MST))
  - Summer (DST): UTC-6 (MDT)
- Area code: 505
- FIPS code: 35-44145
- GNIS feature ID: 2408139

Los Trujillos-Gabaldon is a census-designated place (CDP) in Valencia County, New Mexico, United States. The population was 2,166 at the 2000 census. It is part of the Albuquerque Metropolitan Statistical Area.

== Geography ==
According to the United States Census Bureau, the CDP has a total area of 5.9 square miles (15 km^{2}), all land.

== Demographics ==
As of the census of 2000, there were 2,166 people, 804 households, and 598 families residing in the CDP. The population density was 364.9 inhabitants per square mile (140.9/km^{2}). There were 870 housing units at an average density of 146.6 units per square mile (56.6 units/km^{2}). The racial makeup of the CDP was 71.93% White, 1.15% African American, 2.31% Native American, 0.18% Asian, 19.62% from other races, and 4.80% from two or more races. Hispanic or Latino of any race were 62.47% of the population.

There were 804 households, out of which 32.3% had children under the age of 18 living with them, 56.3% were married couples living together, 12.9% had a female householder with no husband present, and 25.6% were non-families. 20.0% of all households were made up of individuals, and 7.1% had someone living alone who was 65 years of age or older. The average household size was 2.69 and the average family size was 3.09.

In the CDP, the population was spread out, with 26.4% under the age of 18, 8.9% from 18 to 24, 26.8% from 25 to 44, 25.2% from 45 to 64, and 12.8% who were 65 years of age or older. The median age was 37 years. For every 100 females, there were 97.8 males. For every 100 females age 18 and over, there were 99.1 males.

The median income for a household in the CDP was $28,989, and the median income for a family was $35,433. Males had a median income of $28,661 versus $21,492 for females. The per capita income for the CDP was $13,959. About 12.8% of families and 15.4% of the population were below the poverty line, including 17.4% of those under age 18 and 16.9% of those age 65 or over.
