= Los Lunas Public Schools =

School district in New Mexico, United States

Los Lunas Public Schools is a school district based in Los Lunas, New Mexico.

Los Lunas Public Schools' attendance area includes, in addition to Los Lunas: Bosque Farms, Chical, El Cerro, El Cerro Mission, Highland Meadows, Meadow Lake, Monterey Park, Peralta, and Valencia. It also includes sections of the Isleta Pueblo and Belen, Las Maravillas, Los Chaves, and Tomé.

In 2005 the district had a total of 16 schools with approximately 8,500 students. It had 8 elementary, 3 intermediate, 2 middle, and 2 high schools, as well as 1 alternative high school.

== Schools ==
High schools

- Los Lunas High School (grades 9-12)
- Valencia High School (grades 9-12)
- Century High School (alternative high school, grades 10-12)(previously known as Daniel Fernandez Intermediate School)

Middle schools (Grades 7-8)

- Los Lunas Middle School
- Valencia Middle School (previously known as Manzano Vista Middle School)

Elementary schools (Grades PreK through 6)

- Bosque Farms Elementary
- Desert View Elementary (previously known as Desert View Intermediate School)
- Raymond Gabaldon Elementary School (previously known as Raymond Gabaldon Intermediate School)
- Katherine Gallegos Elementary School
- Los Lunas Elementary School
- Peralta Elementary
- Ann Parish Elementary School
- Sundance Elementary
- Tomé Elementary
- Valencia Elementary
