= Albuquerque metropolitan area =

Metropolitan area in central New Mexico, US

Albuquerque Metropolitan Area
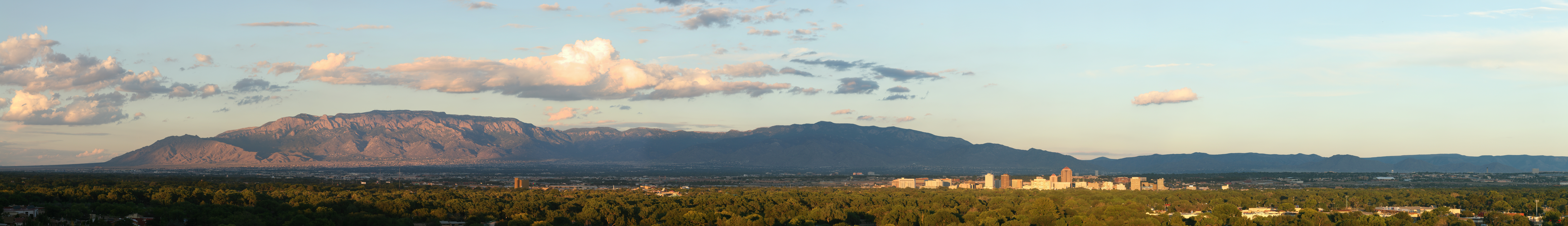
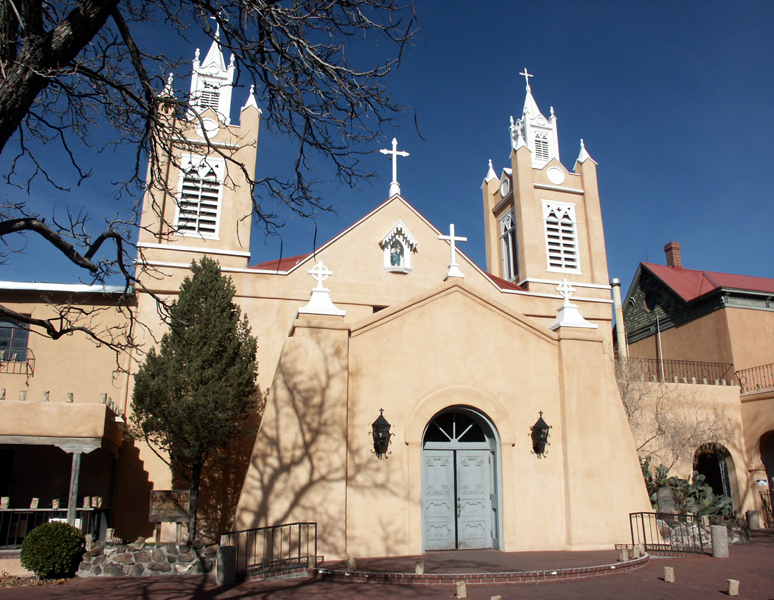
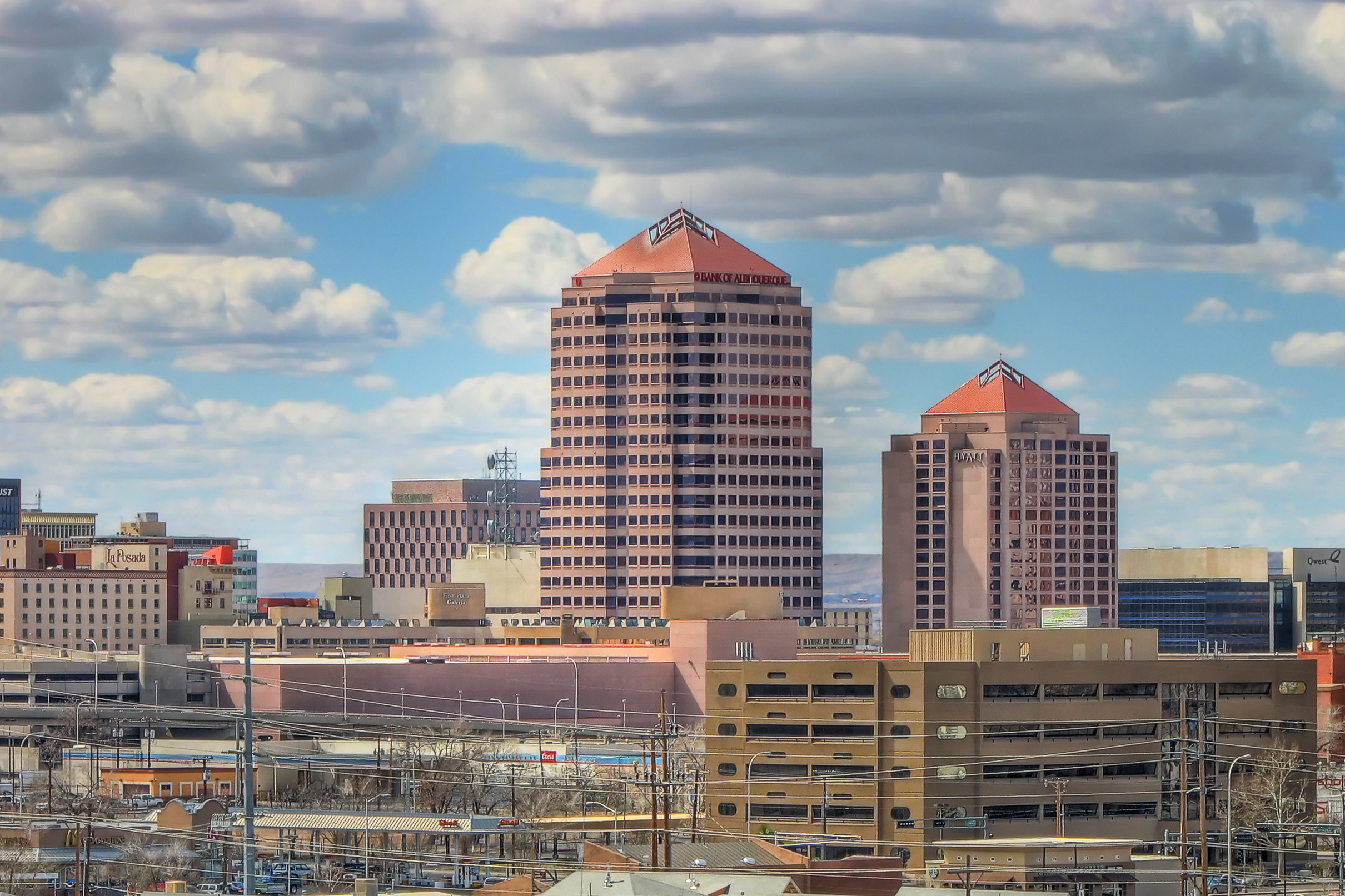
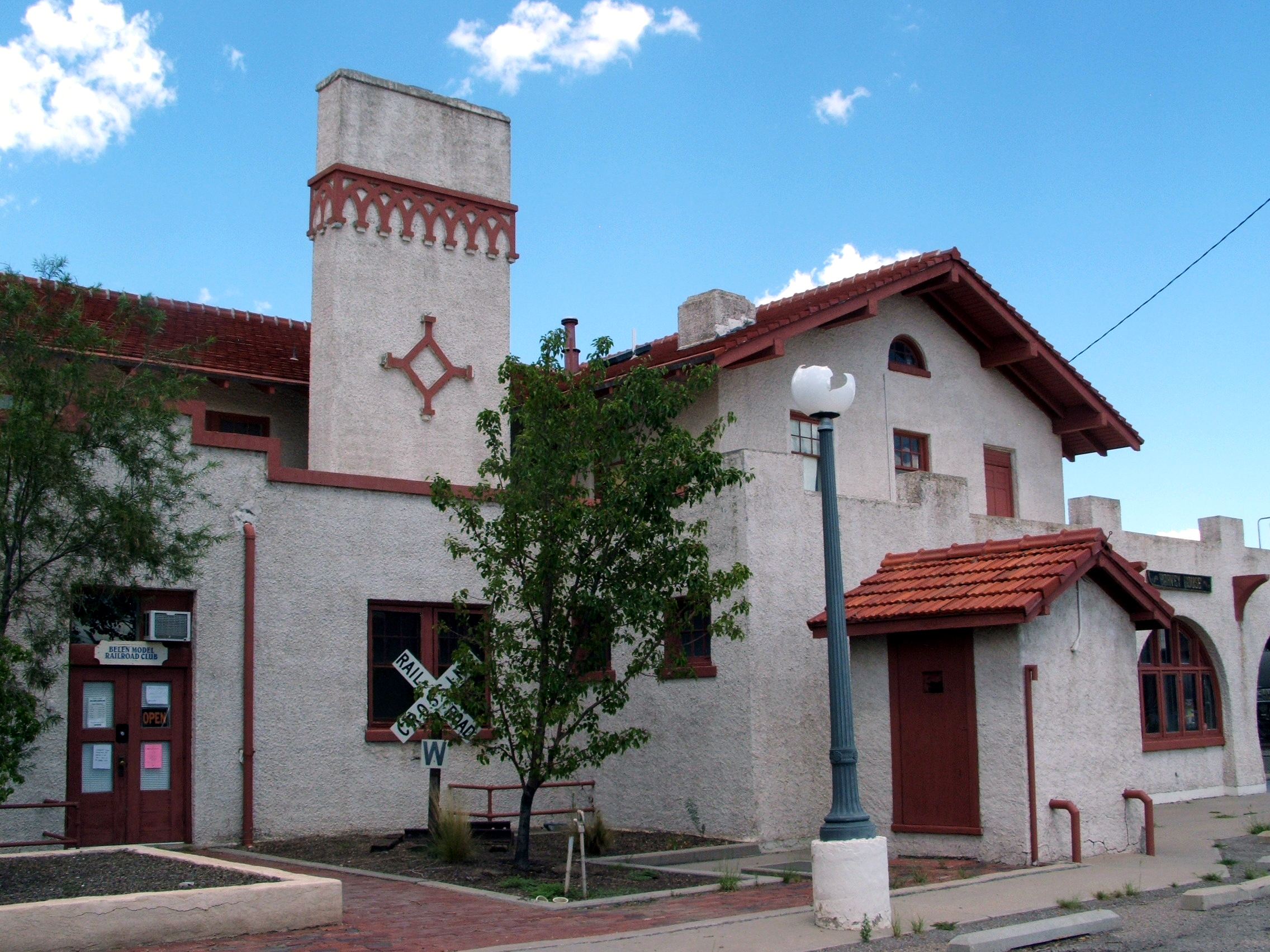
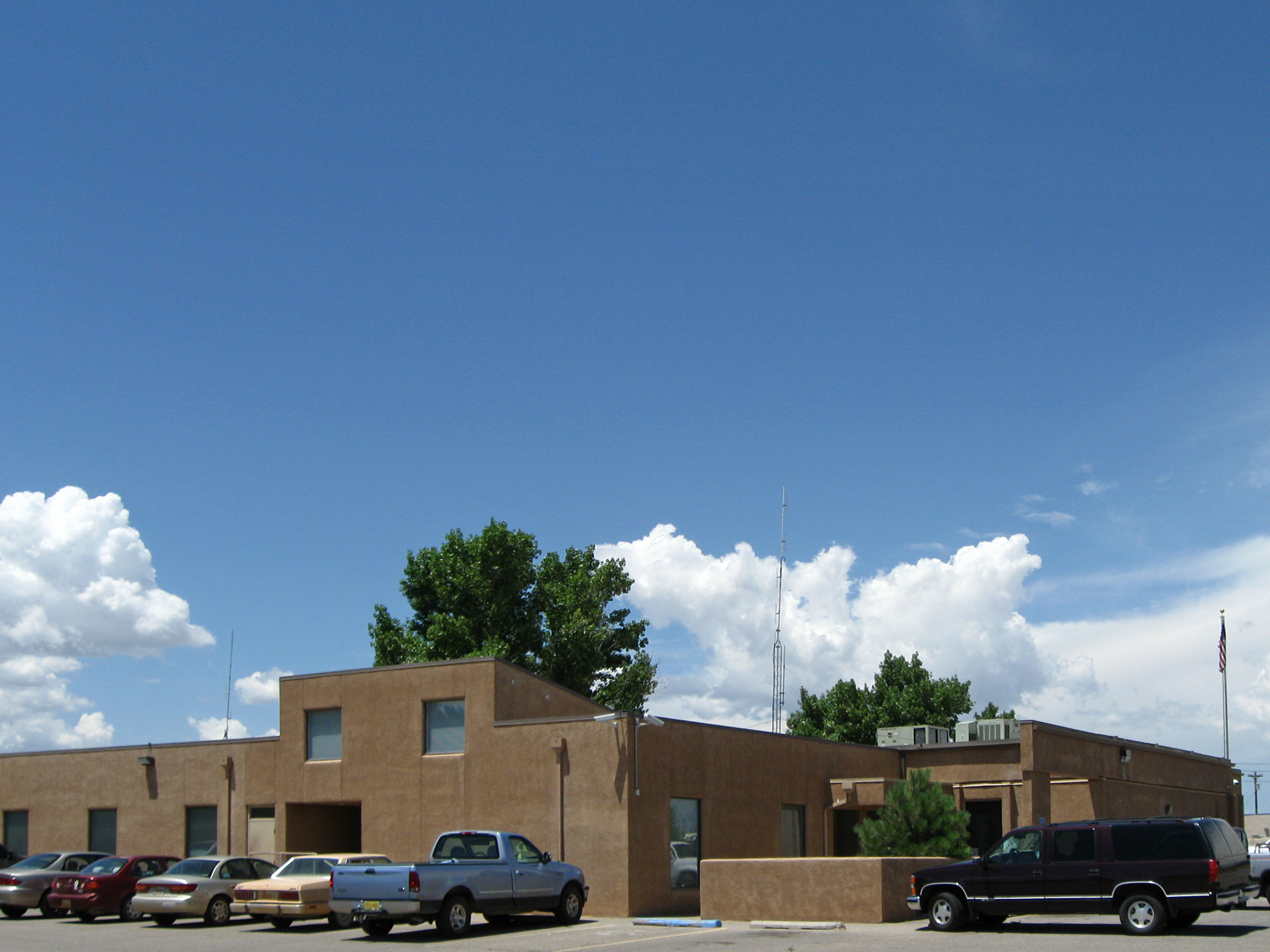
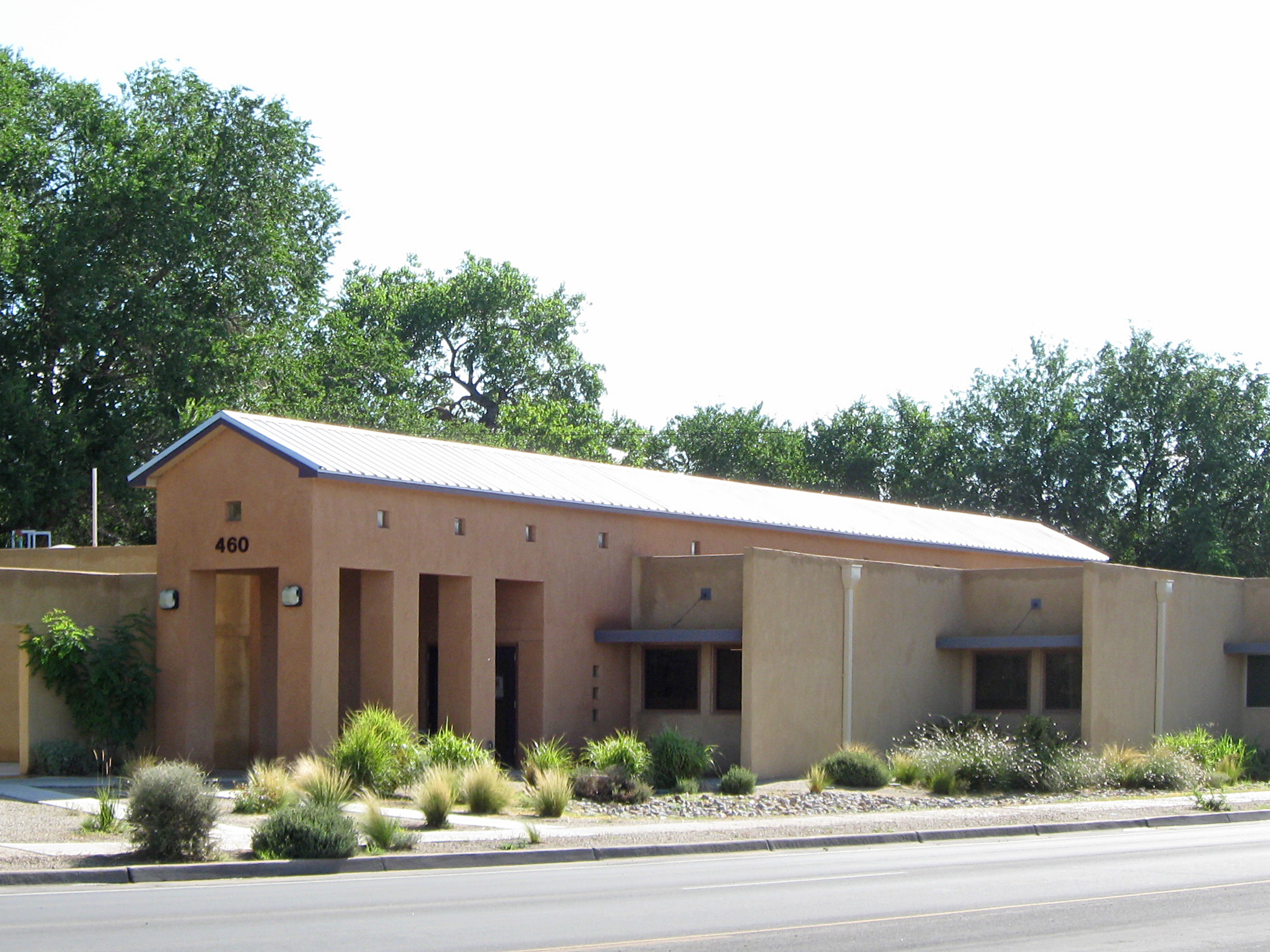
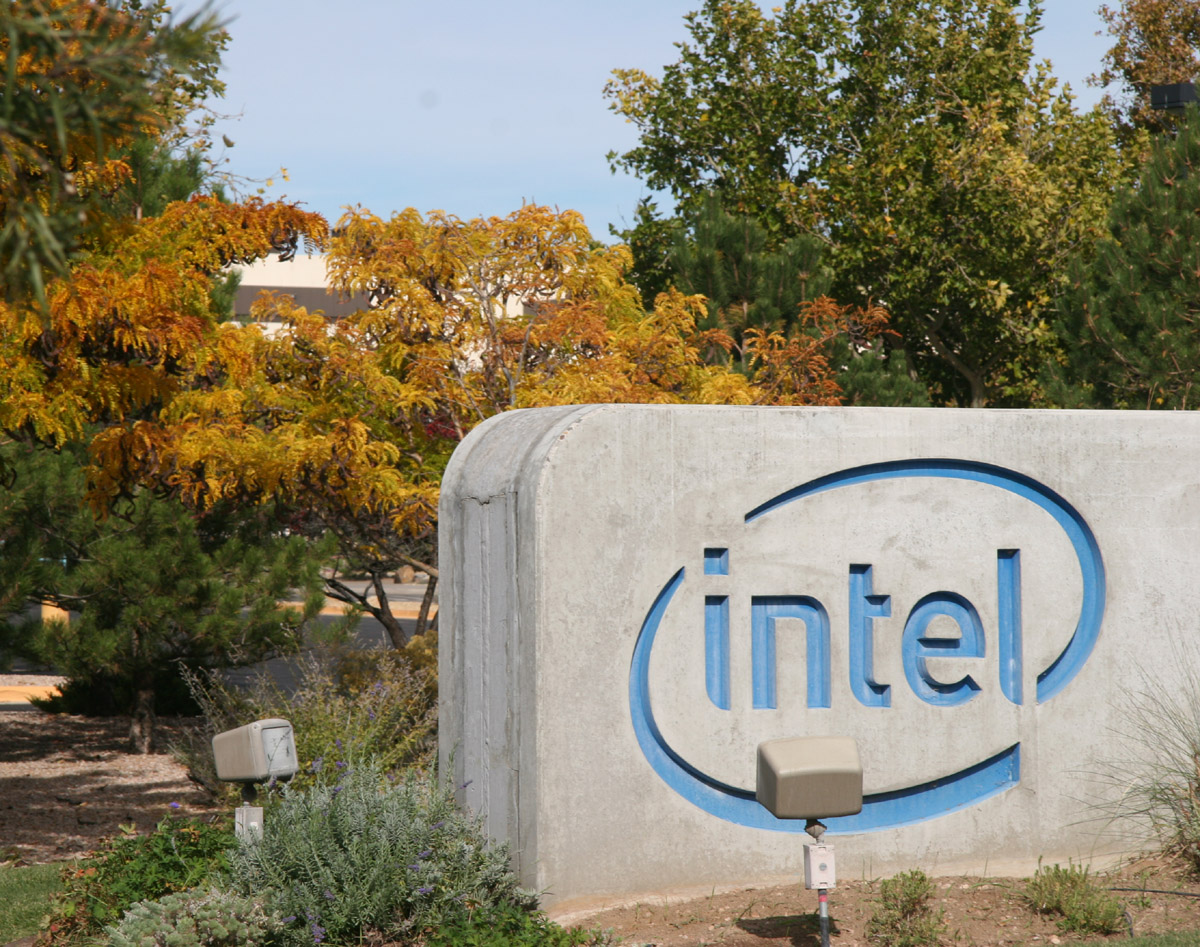
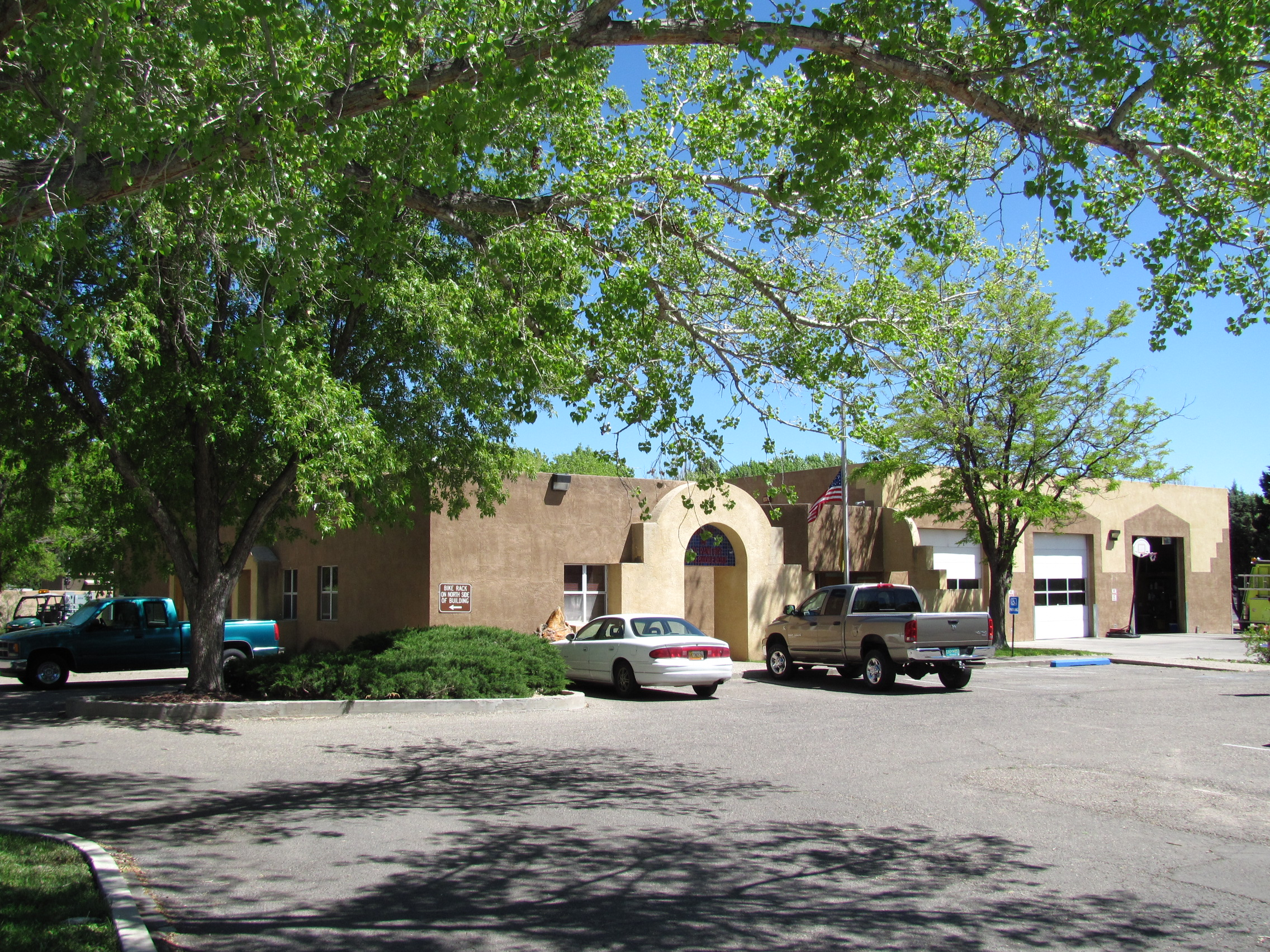
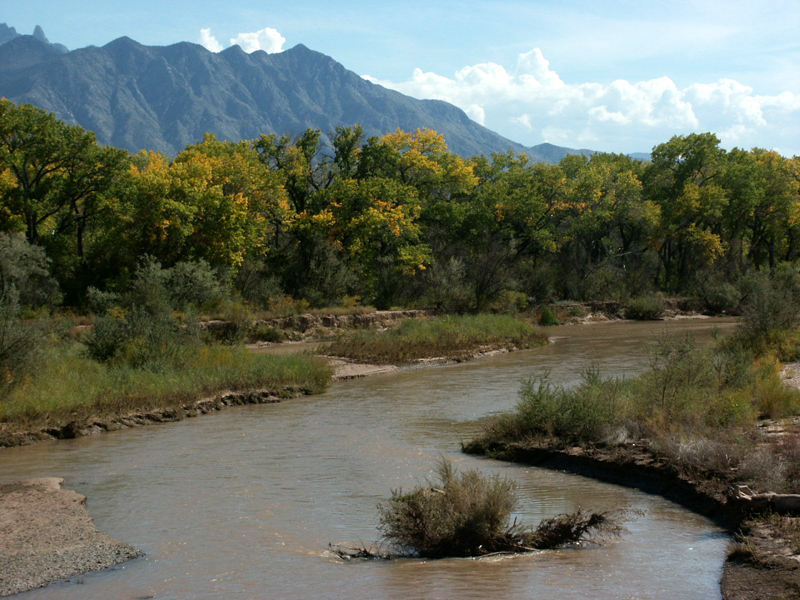
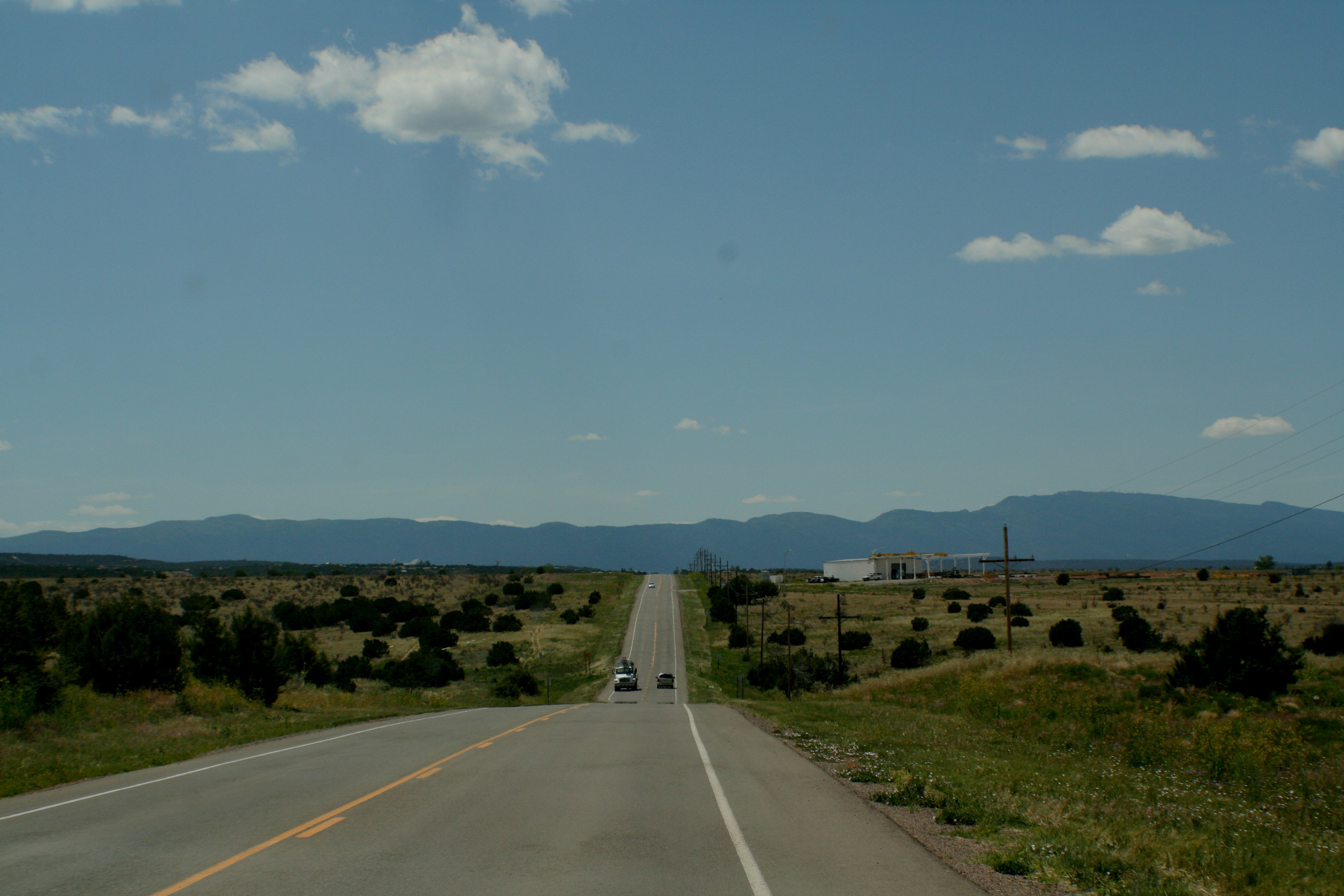
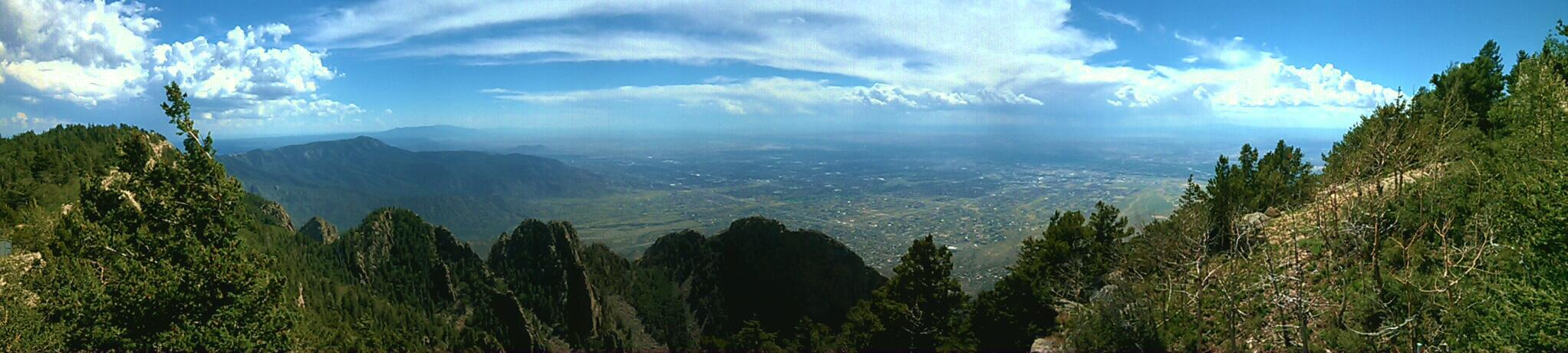
- (top-to-bottom, left-to-right) Panorama of the city of Albuquerque; San Felipe de Neri Church in Old Town Albuquerque; Downtown Albuquerque; Fred Harvey Company Harvey House museum in Belen; Moriarty municipal; Los Lunas; Intel Fab 11x in Rio Rancho; village hall in Los Ranchos; Rio Grande Bosque near Bernalillo; U.S. Route 66 in New Mexico; panorama from the Sandia Mountains peak
Map of Albuquerque–Santa Fe–Los Alamos, NM
Albuquerque, NM MSA
Santa Fe, NM MSA
Española, NM MSA
Las Vegas, NM MSA
Los Alamos, NM MSA
- Country: United States
- State: New Mexico
- Statistical Area: Albuquerque–Santa Fe–Los Alamos combined statistical area
- Principal counties (cities): List: Bernalillo County (Albuquerque); Sandoval County (Rio Rancho); Torrance County (Moriarty); Valencia County (Belen, Los Lunas)

Area
  - Total: 9,297 sq mi (24,080 km^{2})
- Elevation (Average height): 5,312 ft (1,619 m)
- Highest elevation (Sandia Mountains Crest): 10,678 ft (3,255 m)
- Lowest elevation (Near the Rio Grande, south of Jarales): 4,767 ft (1,453 m)

Population (2025)
  - Total: 935,171
  - Density: 100.6/sq mi (38.84/km^{2})

GDP
  - Total: $59.383 billion (2023)
  - Per capita: $63,500 (2023)
- Time zone: UTC−7 (MST)
  - Summer (DST): UTC−6 (MDT)

The Albuquerque Metropolitan Statistical Area is a metropolitan area in central New Mexico centered on the city of Albuquerque. The metro comprises four counties: Bernalillo, Sandoval, Torrance, and Valencia. As of the 2010 United States census, the MSA had a population of 887,077. The population is estimated to be 923,630 as of July 1, 2020, making Greater Albuquerque the 61st-largest MSA in the nation. The Albuquerque MSA forms a part of the larger Albuquerque–Santa Fe–Los Alamos combined statistical area with a 2020 estimated population of 1,165,181, ranked 49th-largest in the country.

== History ==
It was the center of the Aztec legend of the Seven Cities of Gold, sometimes called the "cities of Cibola". The Tiguex Province of Santa Fe de Nuevo México was named after the Southern Tiwa speaking Puebloans in the area, they inhabited the area along with the Jemez and Keres people. The area between Bernalillo and Corrales was being farmed for sacramental wine since 1620, which started the New Mexico wine heritage. Following this early wine industry several Spanish towns were founded, including Barelas in 1662 and Bernalillo in 1695. The main city, Albuquerque, was founded on 1706 as La Villa de Alburquerque as the trade center for the region. During the 19th century, Nuevo México and its Tiguex Province were acquired by the United States as a part of the Treaty of Guadalupe Hidalgo. Becoming the New Mexico Territory it became a prominent aspect of the American frontier during the 19th century, being highlighted in Western fiction with Billy the Kid, Elfego Baca, and Geronimo becoming lasting icons in later adaptation to film. In the 20th century New Mexico gained statehood, and since then trade in the region grew due to growth in technology, media, and agriculture sectors, driven by the New Mexico Technology Corridor, media in Albuquerque, and New Mexican cuisine.

== Counties ==
County	Seat	2025 estimate	2020 Census	Change	Area	Density
Bernalillo	Albuquerque	667,601	676,444	−1.31%	1,167 sq mi (3,020 km^{2})	572/sq mi (221/km^{2})
Sandoval	Bernalillo	159,565	148,834	+7.21%	3,716 sq mi (9,620 km^{2})	43/sq mi (17/km^{2})
Valencia	Los Lunas	82,013	76,205	+7.62%	1,068 sq mi (2,770 km^{2})	77/sq mi (30/km^{2})
Torrance	Estancia	16,100	15,045	+7.01%	3,346 sq mi (8,670 km^{2})	5/sq mi (2/km^{2})
Total		925,279	916,528	+0.95%	9,297 sq mi (24,080 km^{2})	100/sq mi (38/km^{2})

== Communities ==
=== Cities ===
- Albuquerque (Principal city) 562,599
- Belen 7,423
- Moriarty 1,940
- Rio Communities 4,977
- Rio Rancho 105,815

=== Towns ===
- Bernalillo
- Estancia
- Mountainair
- Peralta

=== Villages ===
- Bosque Farms
- Corrales
- Cuba
- Encino
- Jemez Springs
- Los Lunas
- Los Ranchos de Albuquerque
- San Ysidro
- Tijeras
- Willard

=== Census-designated places ===
- Algodones
- Carnuel
- Casa Colorada
- Cedar Crest
- Chilili
- Cochiti
- El Cerro-Monterey Park
- Isleta Village Proper
- Jarales
- Jemez Pueblo
- La Jara
- Los Chavez
- Los Trujillos-Gabaldon
- Manzano
- Meadow Lake
- North Valley
- Paradise Hills
- Peña Blanca
- Placitas
- Ponderosa
- Ponderosa Pine
- Pueblo of Sandia Village
- Regina
- Rio Communities North
- Rio Communities
- San Felipe Pueblo
- Santa Ana Pueblo
- Santo Domingo Pueblo
- South Valley
- Tajique
- Tome-Adelino
- Torreon (Sandoval County)
- Torreon (Torrance County)
- Valencia
- Zia Pueblo

==== Partial inclusions and future developments ====
Neighboring Laguna Pueblo borders the metropolitan area, and part of its boundaries are included the metropolitan population. Most notably the area surrounding Route 66 Resort and Casino.

Mesa del Sol in Albuquerque and Santolina on the West Mesa in rural Bernalillo County are planned for 100,000 inhabitants each and are New Mexico's largest such planned developments.

== Demographics ==
Historical population
Census	Pop.	Note	%±
1900	28,630		—
1910	23,606		−17.5%
1920	29,855		26.5%
1930	45,430		52.2%
1940	69,391		52.7%
1950	145,675		109.9%
1960	321,982		121.0%
1970	379,085		17.7%
1980	523,105		38.0%
1990	599,416		14.6%
2000	729,649		21.7%
2010	887,077		21.6%
2020	916,528		3.3%
U.S. Decennial Census

As of the 2010 United States census, there were 887,077 people, 347,366 households, and 222,811 families residing within the MSA. The racial makeup of the MSA was 49.63% White, 2.68% African American, 5.86% Native American, 2.02% Asian, 0.10% Pacific Islander, 15.40% from one other race, and 4.32% from two or more races. Hispanic or Latino of any race were 46.70% of the population.

The median income for a household in the MSA was $47,383 and the median income for a family was $59,158. Males had a median income of $31,486 versus $20,497 for females. The per capita income for the MSA was $25,044.

According to 2014-2018 census data, 89.7% of the population was a high school graduate or higher, and 34.7% had a bachelor's degree or higher.

== Labor force ==
Albuquerque MSA Estimated Employment (August 2006)

Bernalillo County	304,855
Sandoval County	48,055
Torrance County	16,021
Valencia County	30,591
Total	399,522
Source: New Mexico Department of Labor

== See also ==
- List of metropolitan areas in New Mexico
- List of micropolitan areas in New Mexico
- List of cities in New Mexico
