= Los Lunas, New Mexico =

- Village
- Village of Los Lunas
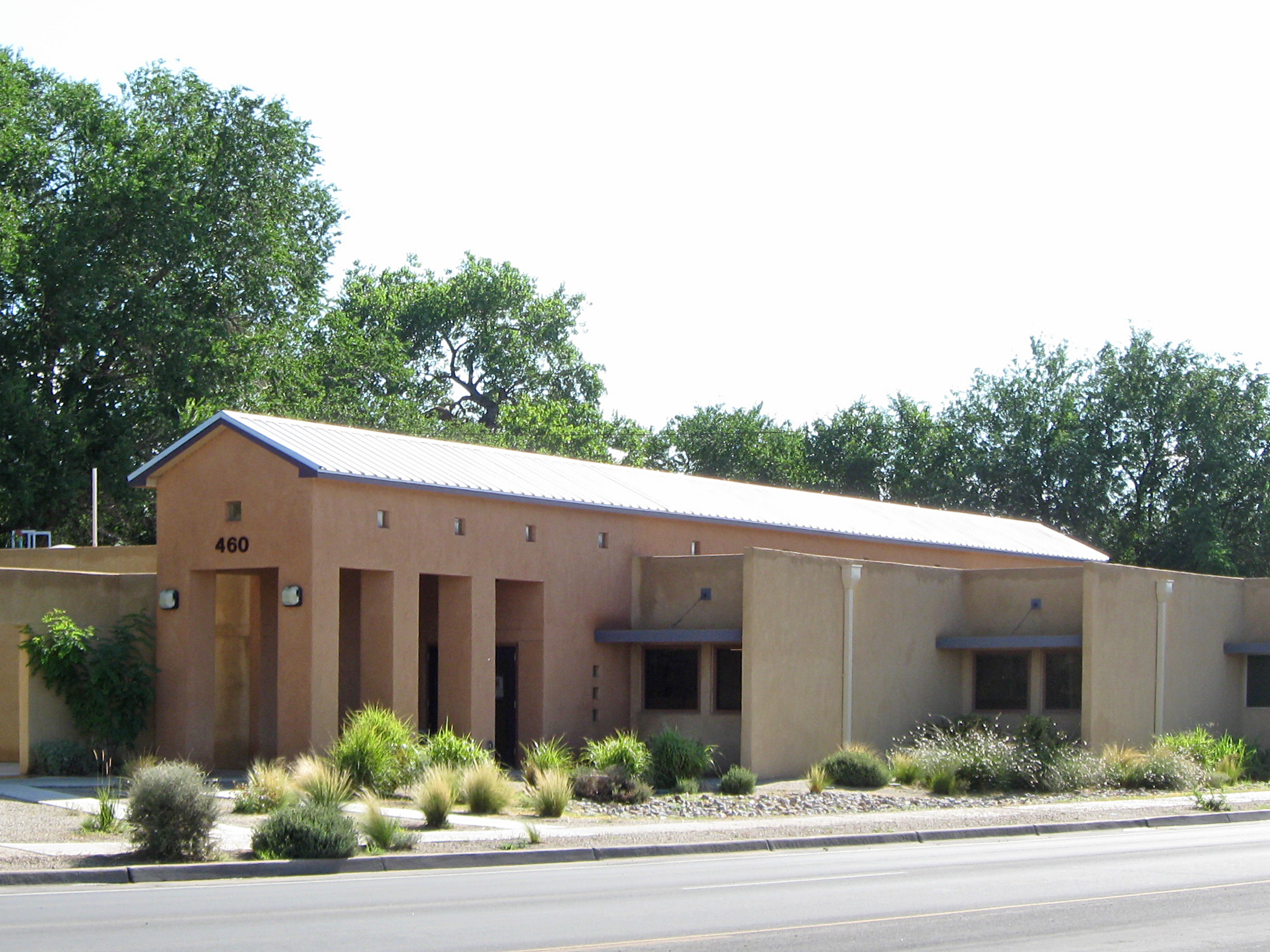
- Los Lunas Public Library
- Nicknames: The Moon, Looneyville
- Location of Los Lunas, New Mexico

- Location in the United States
- Coordinates: 34°48′34″N 106°44′7″W
- Country: United States
- State: New Mexico
- County: Valencia

Area
  - Total: 20.37 sq mi (52.75 km^{2})
  - Land: 20.36 sq mi (52.74 km^{2})
  - Water: 0.0039 sq mi (0.01 km^{2})
- Elevation: 4,860 ft (1,480 m)

Population (2020)
  - Total: 17,242
  - Density: 846.7/sq mi (326.93/km^{2})
- Time zone: UTC−7 (Mountain (MST))
  - Summer (DST): UTC−6 (MDT)
- ZIP code: 87031
- Area code: 505
- FIPS code: 35-43370
- GNIS feature ID: 0891361
- Website: www.loslunasnm.gov

Los Lunas is a village in Valencia County, New Mexico, United States. As of the 2020 census, the village has a population of 17,242. It is the county seat of Valencia County. Los Lunas is part of the Albuquerque metropolitan area.

== History ==
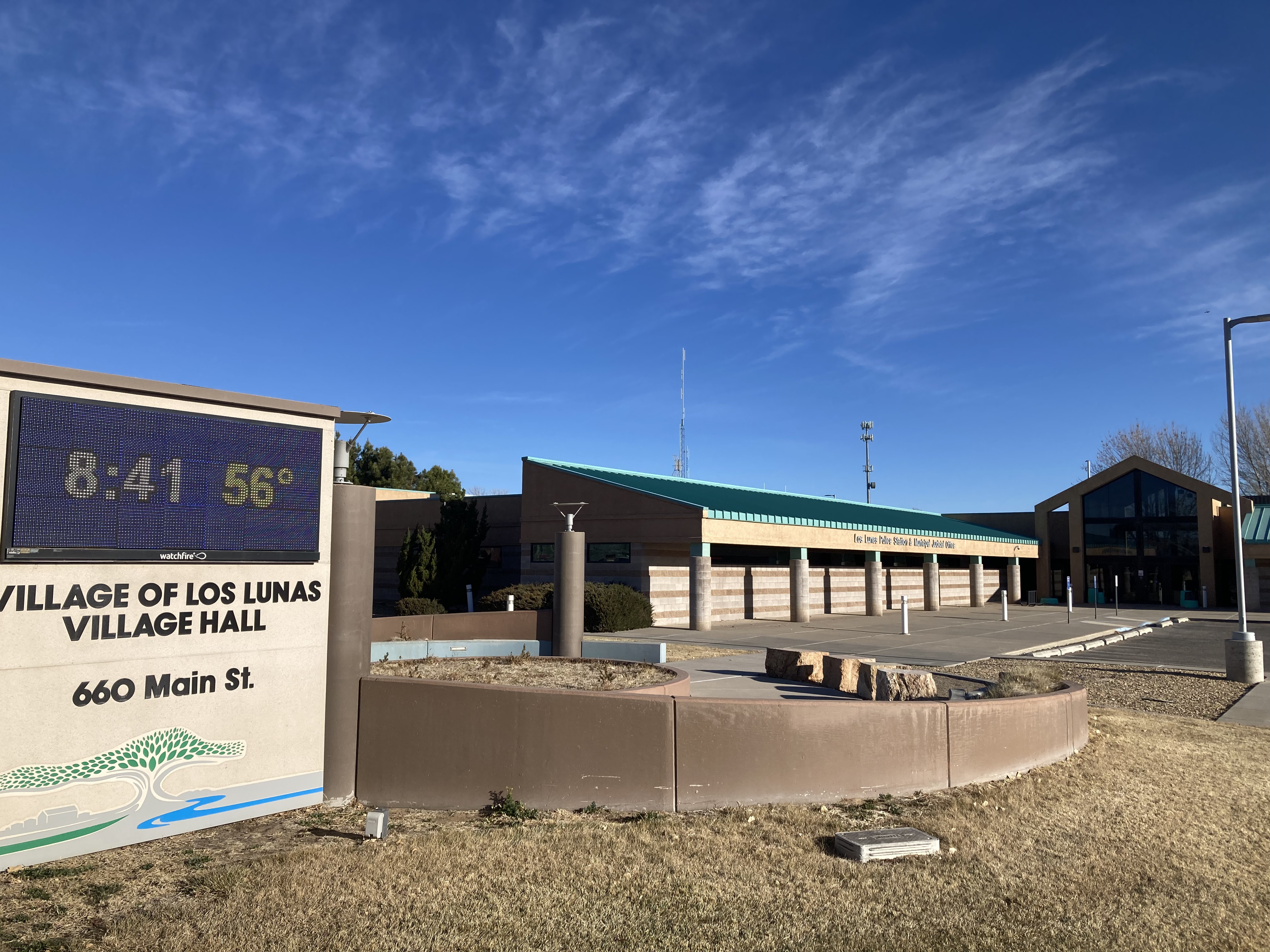
Los Lunas government building

The original land grant was made to Don Adrian Luna Candelaria in 1716, but within two years it was given to the Luna family. Some Civil War battles were fought near the village. Los Lunas became the county seat in 1876 and became an incorporated village in 1928. The Los Lunas Decalogue Stone is located nearby.

A United States Army Air Forces bombing range, used by elements of the 509th Bomb Wing out of Kirtland Army Air Field, later Kirtland Air Force Base, was located here during and after World War II.

Los Lunas and its surrounding communities were impacted by the Desert Willow Complex Fire, which burned multiple homes in the Carson Park district as well as injuring over a dozen people.

== Geography ==
According to the United States Census Bureau, the village has a total area of 10.1 square miles (26.0 km^{2}), all land. The village lies in the Rio Grande Valley of the Albuquerque Basin on the west bank of the Rio Grande, and is on State Highway 6, east of Interstate 25. El Cerro de Los Lunas, a volcano related to the Rio Grande rift, forms a prominent landmark at the western edge of the village.

=== Climate ===
According to the Köppen Climate Classification system, Los Lunas has a cold semi-arid climate, abbreviated "BSk" on climate maps. The hottest temperature recorded in Los Lunas was 110 °F (43.3 °C) on August 13, 1948, while the coldest temperature recorded was −25 °F (−31.7 °C) on January 7, 1971.

Climate data for Los Lunas, New Mexico, 1991–2020 normals, extremes 1892–present
Month	Jan	Feb	Mar	Apr	May	Jun	Jul	Aug	Sep	Oct	Nov	Dec	Year
Record high °F (°C)	75 (24)	82 (28)	93 (34)	94 (34)	102 (39)	108 (42)	106 (41)	110 (43)	100 (38)	93 (34)	84 (29)	74 (23)	110 (43)
Mean maximum °F (°C)	65.8 (18.8)	72.3 (22.4)	81.2 (27.3)	86.4 (30.2)	94.3 (34.6)	101.7 (38.7)	102.3 (39.1)	99.1 (37.3)	95.4 (35.2)	87.9 (31.1)	76.0 (24.4)	65.9 (18.8)	103.3 (39.6)
Mean daily maximum °F (°C)	51.4 (10.8)	57.7 (14.3)	65.7 (18.7)	73.1 (22.8)	81.7 (27.6)	91.8 (33.2)	93.3 (34.1)	91.1 (32.8)	85.0 (29.4)	74.3 (23.5)	60.9 (16.1)	50.2 (10.1)	73.0 (22.8)
Daily mean °F (°C)	35.2 (1.8)	40.5 (4.7)	47.9 (8.8)	55.1 (12.8)	64.1 (17.8)	73.7 (23.2)	77.7 (25.4)	75.7 (24.3)	68.3 (20.2)	56.4 (13.6)	43.7 (6.5)	35.0 (1.7)	56.1 (13.4)
Mean daily minimum °F (°C)	19.0 (−7.2)	23.4 (−4.8)	30.1 (−1.1)	37.2 (2.9)	46.4 (8.0)	55.5 (13.1)	62.2 (16.8)	60.3 (15.7)	51.7 (10.9)	38.4 (3.6)	26.6 (−3.0)	19.7 (−6.8)	39.2 (4.0)
Mean minimum °F (°C)	7.4 (−13.7)	10.5 (−11.9)	16.5 (−8.6)	24.9 (−3.9)	33.4 (0.8)	44.3 (6.8)	53.3 (11.8)	51.7 (10.9)	39.3 (4.1)	25.5 (−3.6)	12.6 (−10.8)	7.0 (−13.9)	3.8 (−15.7)
Record low °F (°C)	−25 (−32)	−15 (−26)	4 (−16)	10 (−12)	20 (−7)	34 (1)	39 (4)	40 (4)	25 (−4)	14 (−10)	−15 (−26)	−22 (−30)	−25 (−32)
Average precipitation inches (mm)	0.45 (11)	0.42 (11)	0.54 (14)	0.55 (14)	0.49 (12)	0.52 (13)	1.55 (39)	1.53 (39)	1.15 (29)	0.92 (23)	0.57 (14)	0.54 (14)	9.23 (233)
Average snowfall inches (cm)	1.5 (3.8)	0.7 (1.8)	0.3 (0.76)	0.0 (0.0)	0.0 (0.0)	0.0 (0.0)	0.0 (0.0)	0.0 (0.0)	0.0 (0.0)	0.4 (1.0)	0.6 (1.5)	1.6 (4.1)	5.1 (12.96)
Average precipitation days (≥ 0.01 in)	3.3	3.2	3.4	3.0	3.0	3.3	8.3	7.8	5.6	4.3	3.1	3.3	51.6
Average snowy days (≥ 0.1 in)	0.9	0.5	0.2	0.0	0.0	0.0	0.0	0.0	0.0	0.2	0.4	0.6	2.8
Source 1: NOAA
Source 2: National Weather Service

== Demographics ==
Historical population
Census	Pop.	Note	%±
1880	876		—
1930	513		—
1940	686		33.7%
1950	889		29.6%
1960	1,186		33.4%
1970	973		−18.0%
1980	3,525		262.3%
1990	6,013		70.6%
2000	10,034		66.9%
2010	14,835		47.8%
2020	17,242		16.2%
U.S. Decennial Census

=== 2020 census ===
As of the 2020 census, Los Lunas had a population of 17,242. The median age was 37.0 years. 25.5% of residents were under the age of 18 and 16.8% of residents were 65 years of age or older. For every 100 females there were 94.7 males, and for every 100 females age 18 and over there were 91.5 males age 18 and over.

98.7% of residents lived in urban areas, while 1.3% lived in rural areas.

There were 6,393 households in Los Lunas, of which 35.4% had children under the age of 18 living in them. Of all households, 44.9% were married-couple households, 17.4% were households with a male householder and no spouse or partner present, and 28.9% were households with a female householder and no spouse or partner present. About 24.8% of all households were made up of individuals and 11.2% had someone living alone who was 65 years of age or older.

There were 6,705 housing units, of which 4.7% were vacant. The homeowner vacancy rate was 1.2% and the rental vacancy rate was 3.3%.

Racial composition as of the 2020 census
Race	Number	Percent
White	8,995	52.2%
Black or African American	302	1.8%
American Indian and Alaska Native	650	3.8%
Asian	178	1.0%
Native Hawaiian and Other Pacific Islander	12	0.1%
Some other race	2,901	16.8%
Two or more races	4,204	24.4%
Hispanic or Latino (of any race)	10,427	60.5%

=== 2010 census ===
Whereas according to the 2010 U.S. census Bureau:

- 72.1% White
- 2.0% Black
- 2.5% Native American
- 0.8% Asian
- 0.1% Native Hawaiian or Pacific Islander
- 4.2% Two or more races
- 18.3% Other races

=== 2000 census ===
As of the 2000 census, there were 10,034 people, 3,601 households, and 2,689 families residing in the village. The population density was 998.8 inhabitants per square mile (385.6/km^{2}). There were 3,845 housing units at an average density of 382.7 units per square mile (147.8 units/km^{2}). The racial makeup of the village was 64.14% White, 1.16% African American, 2.62% Native American, 0.50% Asian, 0.06% Pacific Islander, 27.63% from other races, and 3.90% from two or more races. Hispanic or Latino of any race were 58.74% of the population.

There were 3,601 households, out of which 41.9% had children under the age of 18 living with them, 51.8% were married couples living together, 16.8% had a female householder with no husband present, and 25.3% were non-families. 20.7% of all households were made up of individuals, and 5.8% had someone living alone who was 65 years of age or older. The average household size was 2.75 and the average family size was 3.16.

In the village, the population was spread out, with 31.1% under the age of 18, 9.6% from 18 to 24, 30.1% from 25 to 44, 20.2% from 45 to 64, and 8.9% who were 65 years of age or older. The median age was 32 years. For every 100 females, there were 95.0 males. For every 100 females age 18 and over, there were 90.1 males.

The median income for a household in the village was $36,240, and the median income for a family was $37,255. Males had a median income of $30,664 versus $22,437 for females. The per capita income for the village was $14,692. About 11.6% of families and 13.5% of the population were below the poverty line, including 18.3% of those under age 18 and 7.3% of those age 65 or over.

== Economy ==
On September 14, 2016, Facebook announced their plans to open a data center in Los Lunas. The construction would start in October 2016, and it will be equipped with the latest in the Open Compute Project hardware designs, protected from the frequent dust storms that occur in New Mexico, and powered by 100% clean and renewable energy through solar and wind plants. This data center will support 300 new construction jobs and 50 permanent jobs. The data center opened on February 7, 2019.

The village is served by the New Mexico Rail Runner Express at Los Lunas station. It is also served by Interstate 25 in New Mexico, New Mexico State Road 314, and New Mexico State Road 6.

== Arts and culture ==
The village offers a variety of events to go to. Among them are annual events such as: the St. Patrick's Day Balloon Rally; Fourth of July Parade, celebration and fireworks display at Daniel Fernandez Park; and the Holiday Electric Light Parade down Main Street (NM Highway 6).

== Education ==
Los Lunas' public schools are operated by Los Lunas Public Schools, which includes three high schools, two middle schools, one intermediate school, and ten elementary schools. Another school entitled Family School is a program that allows the combination of public school and homeschooling, found on the Daniel Fernandez Elementary Campus.

Growth was rapid for Los Lunas in the 1990s and early 2000s, with the enrollment of Los Lunas High School reaching nearly 2,500 students around 2004. In fact, Valencia High School opened in 2006 as a relief valve for that enrollment, but due in part to the recession of the late 2000s, the two schools had a similar enrollment by the end of the decade.

Los Lunas is also the site of University of New Mexico–Valencia, a branch campus of the University of New Mexico.

== Media ==
The town has been the site of two episodes of Breaking Bad, serving as the home of Tuco Salamanca.

== Notable people ==
- Rosie Hamlin, singer of the song Angel Baby
- Sal Artiaga, Minor League Baseball president, born in Los Lunas
- Bo Diddley, rock musician, lived in Los Lunas in the 1970s
- Anton Docher (aka The Padre of Isleta) served as a priest in Los Lunas during his long period in Isleta
- Michael A. Montoya, 26th New Mexico State Treasurer
- Adelina Otero-Warren, women's suffragist
- Walter Jon Williams, Nebula Award-winning science fiction author
