= New Mexico State Road 47 =

State highway in New Mexico, United States

State Road 47
- NM 47 highlighted in red

Route information
- Maintained by NMDOT
- Length: 59.529 mi (95.803 km)

Major junctions
- South end: US 60
- NM 304 in Rio Communities; NM 6 in Los Lunas; NM 147 in Isleta Pueblo; I-25 in Albuquerque; NM 500 in Albuquerque; NM 423 in Albuquerque; NM 528 in Albuquerque
- North end: NM 556 in Albuquerque

Location
- Country: United States
- State: New Mexico
- Counties: Bernalillo, Socorro, Valencia

Highway system
- New Mexico State Highway System; Interstate; US; State; Scenic
← NM 45	→ NM 48

New Mexico State Road 47 (NM 47) is a 59.529-mile-long (95.803 km) state highway in Bernalillo, Valencia, and Socorro Counties in New Mexico. NM 47's southern terminus is at an intersection with U.S. Route 60 (US 60). The highway then proceeds north intersecting with Interstate 25 (I-25) before the northern terminus at an intersection with NM 556.

== Route Description ==
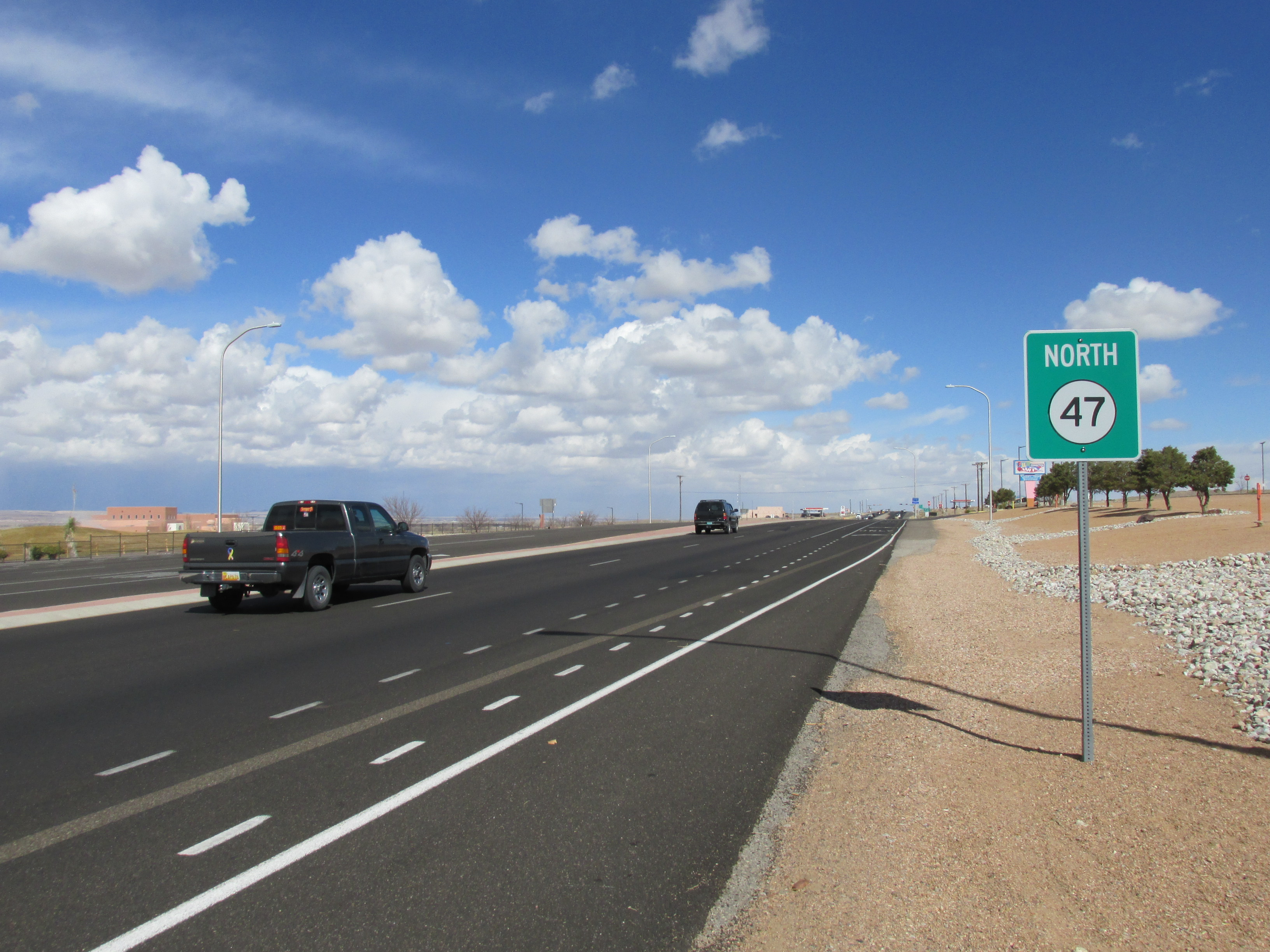
NM 47 northbound near Isleta Pueblo, February 2013

NM 47 begins at an intersection with U.S. Highway 60 in rural Socorro County and proceeds northwest, soon entering Valencia County. The route reaches the town of Rio Communities, which soon junctions NM 304. Shortly after, the route junctions NM 309, allowing commuters to cross the Rio Grande to reach Belen. At this junction, NM 47 turns slightly east of north and follows the eastern shore of the Rio Grande, opposite from NM 314. NM 47 soon enters the community of Valencia and junctions NM 263 twice, as NM 263 is a loop road providing access to El Cerro and other communities in the eastern part of the county. NM 47 will terminate NM 263 in the south but simply junction it to the north. NM 47 soon enters the village of Los Lunas and junction NM 6, which it terminates. NM 47 makes a right turn and moves north into the towns of Peralta and Bosque Farms and soon enter the Pueblo of Isleta. It enters Bernalillo County at Isleta Pueblo and continues to the northeast, where it junctions a spur route NM 147, allowing access to Isleta Village, NM 314, and to cross the Rio Grande. It also soon junctions NM 327, an unsigned highway on the edge of the pueblo. NM 47 then junctions Interstate 25 at a system interchange. The route begins to enter the Albuquerque metropolitan area, where it is signed Broadway Boulevard and enters the community limits of the South Valley, where it intersects NM 500 (Rio Bravo Boulevard). Shortly thereafter, it enters the Albuquerque city limits, continuing northeast through the heart of downtown. After crossing Interstate 40, the route turns west onto Candelaria Road to cross the BNSF railroad line. NM 47 then turns back to the north on 2nd Street, which it follows for the rest of its extent. The route passes briefly through the limits of North Valley, in which it intersects NM 423 (Paseo Del Norte) and NM 528 (Alameda Boulevard). The route finally comes to an end at NM 556 (Roy Road) just short of the Sandoval County line.

== Major intersections ==
County	Location	mi	km	Destinations	Notes
Socorro		0.000	0.000	US 60	Southern terminus
Valencia	Rio Communities	18.931	30.466	NM 304 south	Northern terminus of NM 304
Valencia	Rio Communities	19.190	30.883	NM 309 west	Eastern terminus of NM 309
Valencia	Valencia	27.877	44.864	NM 263 west	Southern terminus of NM 263. NM 263 is a loop road and junctions twice
Valencia	Valencia	29.629	47.683	NM 263	NM 263 is a loop road and junctions twice
Valencia	Los Lunas	30.380	48.892	NM 6 west	Eastern terminus of NM 6
Bernalillo	Isleta Pueblo	37.531	60.400	NM 147 west	Eastern terminus of NM 147
Bernalillo	Isleta Pueblo	40.58	65.31	NM 327 west	Eastern terminus of NM 327
Bernalillo	Albuquerque	40.788– 41.482	65.642– 66.759	I-25	I-25 exit 215
Bernalillo	Albuquerque	41.615	66.973	FR 2067	
Bernalillo	Albuquerque	43.750	70.409	Desert Road	Southern terminus of former NM 303
Bernalillo	Albuquerque	46.210	74.368	NM 500 (Rio Bravo Boulevard)	
Bernalillo	Albuquerque	56.821	91.445	NM 423 (Paseo Del Norte)	
Bernalillo	Albuquerque	57.676	92.821	NM 528 (Alameda Boulevard)	
Bernalillo	Albuquerque	59.529	95.803	NM 556 east (Roy Road) to NM 313	Northern terminus, western terminus of NM 556
1.000 mi = 1.609 km; 1.000 km = 0.621 mi

== See also ==
- List of state roads in New Mexico
