= New Mexico State Road 317 =

State highway in New Mexico, United States

State Road 317

Route information
- Maintained by NMDOT
- Length: 1.247 mi (2.007 km)

Major junctions
- West end: Indian Service Route 61 near Isleta Village Proper
- I-25 / US 85 near Isleta Village Proper
- East end: NM 45 / NM 314 near Isleta Village Proper

Location
- Country: United States
- State: New Mexico
- Counties: Bernalillo

Highway system
- New Mexico State Highway System; Interstate; US; State; Scenic
← NM 316	→ NM 318

State Road 317 (NM 317) is a 1.247-mile-long (2.007 km) state highway in the US state of New Mexico. The highway serves as a short connecting route connecting interstate 25 to NM 45/NM 314 while providing access to tribal services and neighborhoods. NM 317's western terminus is a continuation as Indian Service Route 61 at the end of state maintenance west of Isleta Village Proper, and the eastern terminus is at NM 45/NM 314 west of Isleta Village Proper.

== Major intersections ==
The entire route is in Bernalillo County.

Location	mi	km	Destinations	Notes
	0.000	0.000	Indian Service Route 61	Western terminus, continues west as Indian Service Route 61
	0.170– 0.325	0.274– 0.523	I-25 / US 85	I-25 exit 209
	1.247	2.007	NM 45 / NM 314	Eastern terminus
1.000 mi = 1.609 km; 1.000 km = 0.621 mi
