= New Mexico State Road 423 =

Highway in New Mexico

State Road 423
- Paseo del Norte
- NM 423 highlighted in red

Route information
- Maintained by NMDOT
- Length: 10.986 mi (17.680 km)

Major junctions
- West end: Golf Course Road in Albuquerque
- NM 45 in Albuquerque; NM 47 in North Valley; I-25 / US 85 in Albuquerque
- East end: NM 556 in Albuquerque

Location
- Country: United States
- State: New Mexico
- Counties: Bernalillo

Highway system
- New Mexico State Highway System; Interstate; US; State; Scenic
| ← NM 421 | → NM 427 |

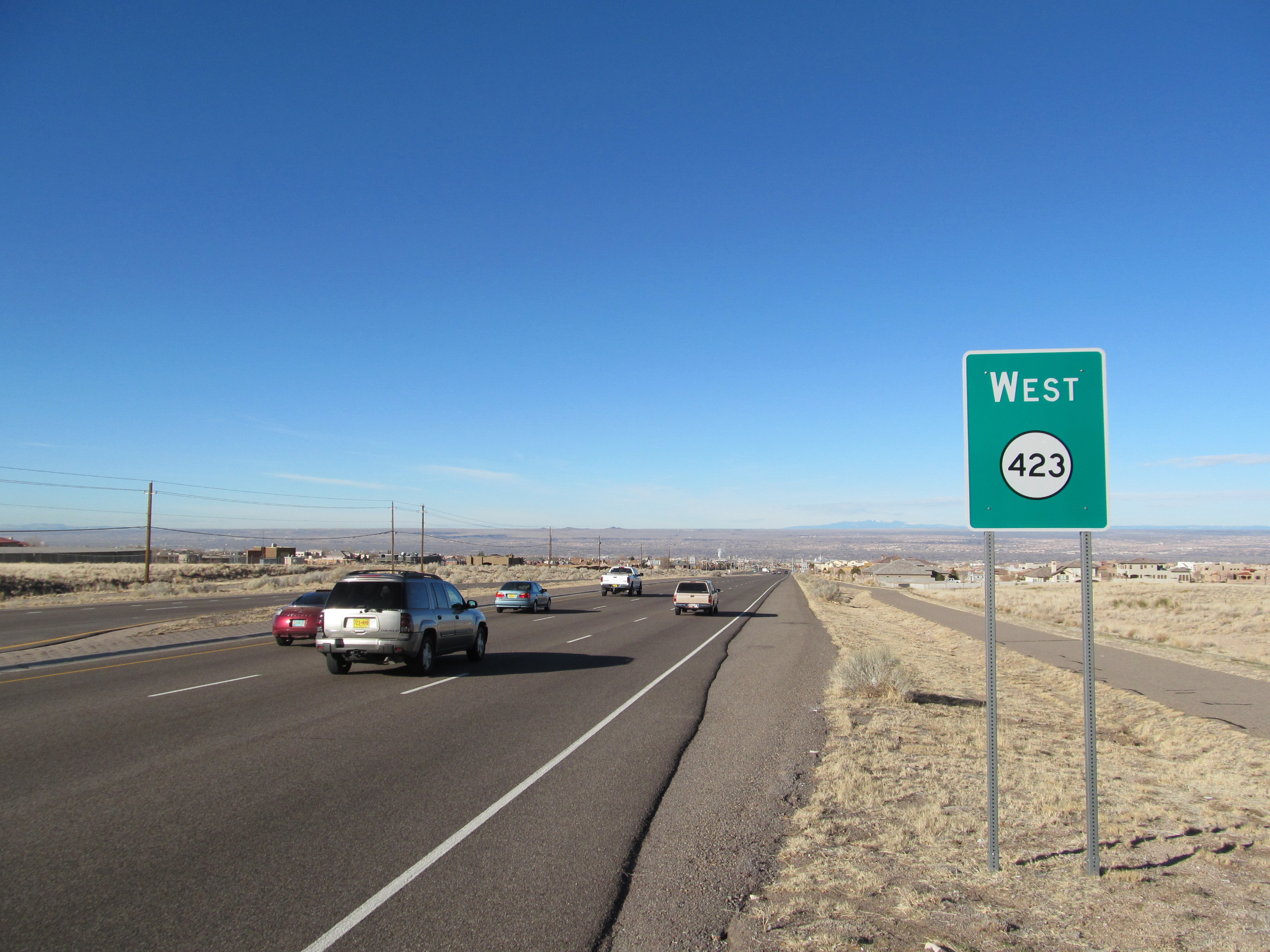
Westbound

New Mexico State Road 423 (NM 423) is a 10.986-mile-long (17.680 km) state highway entirely within Bernalillo County, New Mexico. For its entire length, NM-423 is signed as Paseo del Norte in Albuquerque.

== Route Description ==
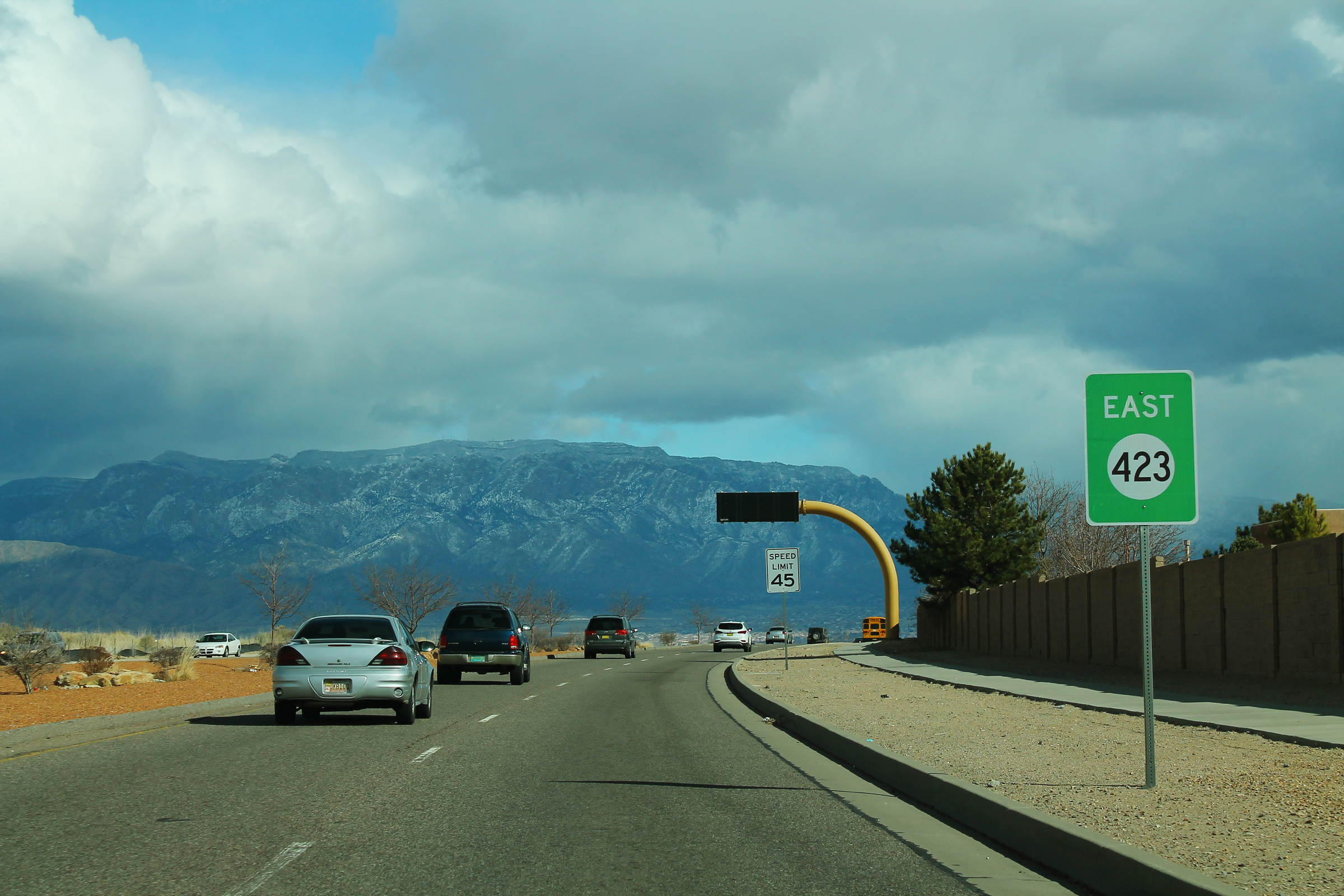
NM 423 eastbound

Paseo del Norte's western terminus is at Atrisco Vista Boulevard on the west mesa of Albuquerque and then proceeds east to Unser Boulevard and the Paradise Hills community. NM 423 begins at Golf Course Road and continues east. From there it then intersects NM 45 at Coors Boulevard, becoming a six-lane controlled access freeway with speed limits of 60 miles per hour (97 km/h). The highway intersects NM 47 at Second/Fourth Street and continues to Jefferson Street. The highway then continues east to Interstate 25 at a hybrid-stack interchange. NM 423 then becomes a six lane divided expressway with at grade intersections and speed limits ranging from 45 miles per hour (72 km/h) to 55 miles per hour (89 km/h). The highway's eastern terminus is at an intersection with NM 556.

== History ==
The highway's bridge over the Rio Grande opened in December 1987 and primarily served commuter traffic from Rio Rancho. Paseo del Norte was originally conceived as part of a 40-mile (64 km) freeway beltway system around central Albuquerque that was never fully built.

=== 2010s reconstruction ===
The New Mexico Department of Transportation (NMDOT) approved a construction design at a cost of US$93 million, US$55 million of which comes from Bernalillo County and the City of Albuquerque, US$29.75 million from the State of New Mexico, and the other US$8.25 million from federal funding. Funding was approved in November 2012; construction began in October 2013, and was completed in December 2014. The completed interchange allowed for unimpeded access on Paseo from I-25 all the way to Golf Course Road, reducing travel times and congestion for the West Side areas and Rio Rancho.

A hybrid stack interchange was built at Paseo Del Norte and I-25, it consists of a fly-over ramp carrying two lanes from Northbound I-25 to Westbound Paseo Del Norte and also a ramp from Eastbound Paseo Del Norte to Southbound I-25, the latter of which goes under the southbound I-25 frontage road. A new loop entrance ramp from Westbound Paseo Del Norte to Southbound I-25 was also built. Initial proposals would have also extended the freeway portion of NM 423 from Jefferson Boulevard east to Louisiana Boulevard, which was ultimately scaled back to its current version. The signalized intersections with the I-25 frontage roads remain in place, the same with at-grade intersections with San Pedro Road and Louisiana Boulevard (to the east of I-25).

A single point urban interchange was also constructed at Jefferson Street, a major artery through Journal Center that had become congested due to the growth of west side neighborhoods. Traffic using the flyover from northbound I-25 to westbound Paseo Del Norte are not able to exit at Jefferson Street.

== Future plans ==
The Mid Region Council of Governments (MRCOG) is proposing to start a bus rapid transit service on Paseo Del Norte. This route would start in southwest Rio Rancho, cross the River on Paseo Del Norte, and terminate south of Journal Center. Plans also call for a connection to another planned BRT route on University to UNM, CNM, and the Sunport. In order to facilitate this new route, the lanes on Paseo Del Norte would be reduced from 6 to 4 for automobile traffic, with the other 2 lanes becoming BRT dedicated lanes. Park and Ride locations would also be built on the west side.

Long-term plans call for NM-347 to eventually be extended south from its present terminus in Rio Rancho to Paseo del Norte in west Albuquerque.

== Major intersections ==
The entire route is in Bernalillo County. All exits are unnumbered.

| Location | mi | km | Destinations | Notes |
|---|---|---|---|---|
| Albuquerque | 0.000 | 0.000 | Golf Course Road | Western terminus |
| Albuquerque | 1.094– 1.194 | 1.761– 1.922 | NM 45 (Coors Boulevard) | Single point urban interchange |
| Albuquerque | 1.894– 1.960 | 3.048– 3.154 | Bridge over the Rio Grande | |
| North Valley | 3.847 | 6.191 | NM 47 (2nd Street) / 4th Street | Modified single point urban interchange |
| Albuquerque | 5.515 | 8.876 | Jefferson Street | Single point urban interchange |
| Albuquerque | 5.826 | 9.376 | I-25 south / US 85 | Eastbound NM 423 access only |
| Albuquerque | 5.934 | 9.550 | FR 2537 south (Pan American West Freeway Southbound) | I-25 exit 232 |
| Albuquerque | 5.992 | 9.643 | I-25 south / US 85 | Westbound NM 423 access only |
| Albuquerque | 6.078 | 9.782 | I-25 north / FR 2523 (Pan American East Freeway Northbound) | I-25 exit 232 |
| Albuquerque | 10.986 | 17.680 | NM 556 (Tramway Boulevard) | Eastern terminus |
1.000 mi = 1.609 km; 1.000 km = 0.621 mi: Incomplete access
