= New Mexico State Road 500 =

State highway in New Mexico, United States

State Road 500
- NM 500 highlighted in red

Route information
- Maintained by NMDOT
- Length: 11.828 mi (19.035 km)

Major junctions
- West end: I-40 in Albuquerque
- Historic US 66 in Albuquerque; NM 45 in Albuquerque; NM 47 in Albuquerque
- East end: I-25 / US 85 in Albuquerque

Location
- Country: United States
- State: New Mexico
- Counties: Bernalillo

Highway system
- New Mexico State Highway System; Interstate; US; State; Scenic
← NM 498	→ NM 501

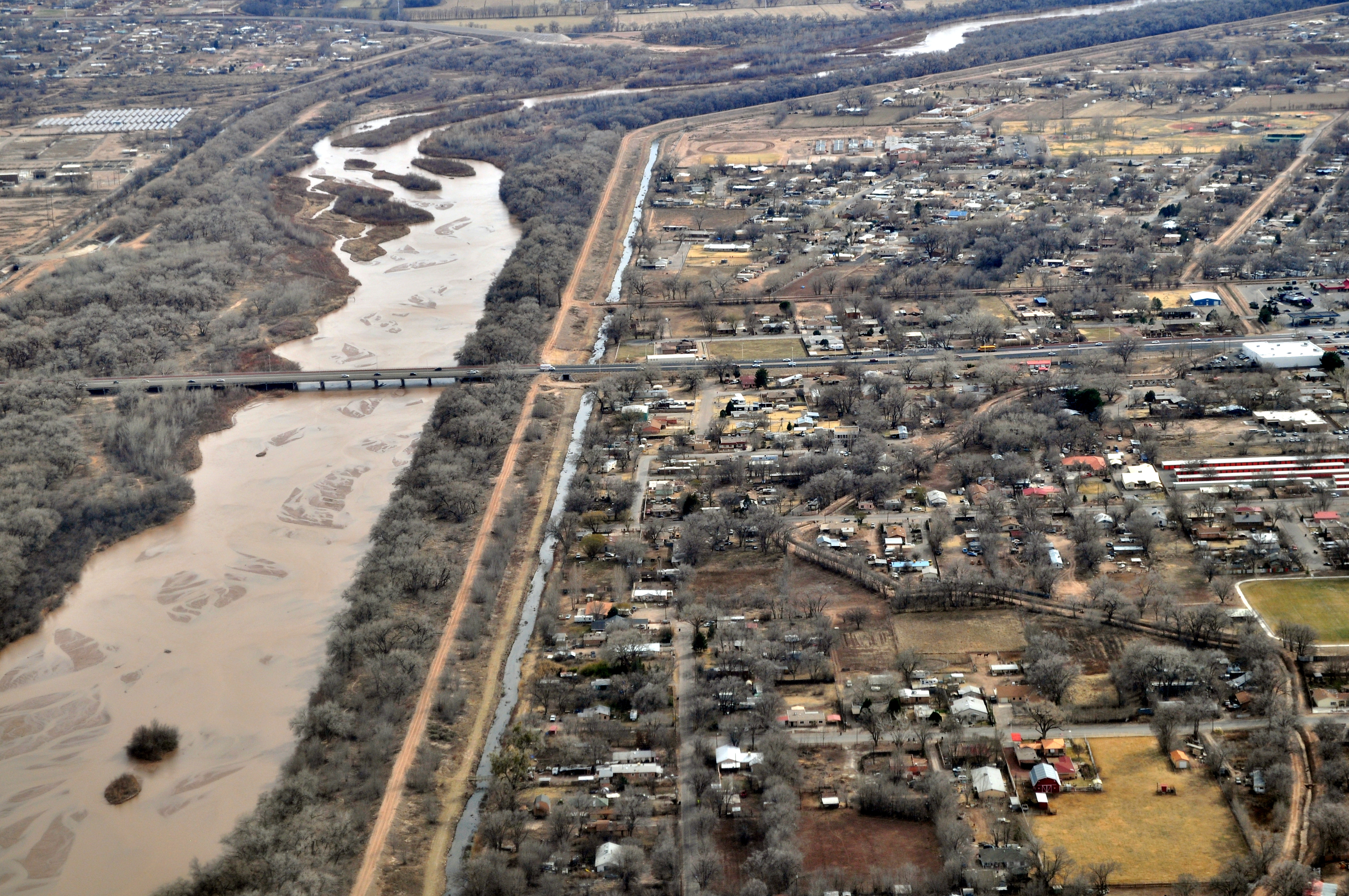
Aerial view of NM 500 crossing the Rio Grande.

New Mexico State Road 500 (NM 500) is a 11.828-mile-long (19.035 km) state highway entirely within Bernalillo County in the US state of New Mexico. NM 500 is signed as Rio Bravo Boulevard, Sen. Dennis Chavez Boulevard, and Atrisco Vista Boulevard. NM 500's western terminus is at Interstate 40 (I-40) and the eastern terminus is at Interstate 25 (I-25) and U.S. Route 85 (US 85).

== Route description ==
NM 500 begins at I-40 and travels south signed as Atrisco Vista Boulevard. It then meets Central Avenue and continues south as a two-lane rural highway. For the next three miles (4.8 km), NM 500 continues southward until it turns at a left-turn-only intersection controlled by a stop sign. Signed as Sen. Dennis Chavez Boulevard, NM 500 continues for around four miles (6.4 km) down the west mesa into the Albuquerque suburbs before meeting Coors Boulevard. NM 500 continues as a four-lane divided road signed as Rio Bravo Boulevard, serving as a major thoroughfare for residents in the South Valley. NM 500 crosses the Rio Grande and meets Second Street, expanded to six lanes, and continues towards Broadway Boulevard. NM 500 meets I-25, its eastern terminus at a partial diamond/cloverleaf interchange. Rio Bravo Boulevard continues easterly to University Boulevard for access to the Sunport and Isleta Amphitheater.

== Major intersections ==
The entire route is in Albuquerque, Bernalillo County.

mi	km	Destinations	Notes
0.000	0.000	I-40	Western terminus, I-40 exit 149
0.207	0.333	Historic US 66 (Central Avenue)	
7.440	11.974	NM 45 (Coors Boulevard)	Former western terminus
9.415	15.152	Isleta Boulevard	Former routing of NM 314
10.675	17.180	Second Street	Routing of former NM 303
11.348	18.263	NM 47 (Broadway Boulevard)	
11.828	19.035	I-25 / US 85	Eastern terminus; I-25 exit 220; roadway continues west to University Boulevard as Rio Bravo Boulevard
1.000 mi = 1.609 km; 1.000 km = 0.621 mi

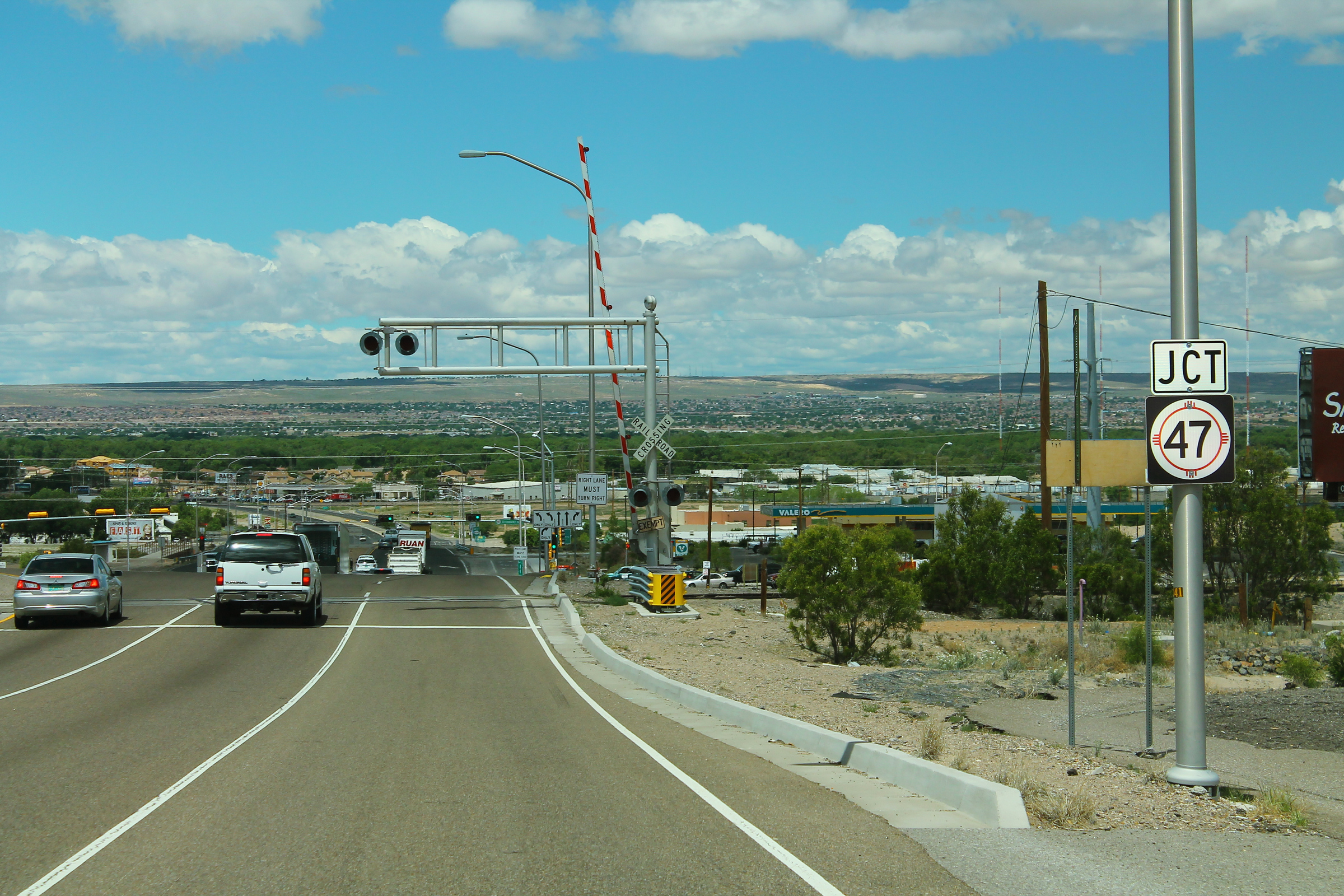

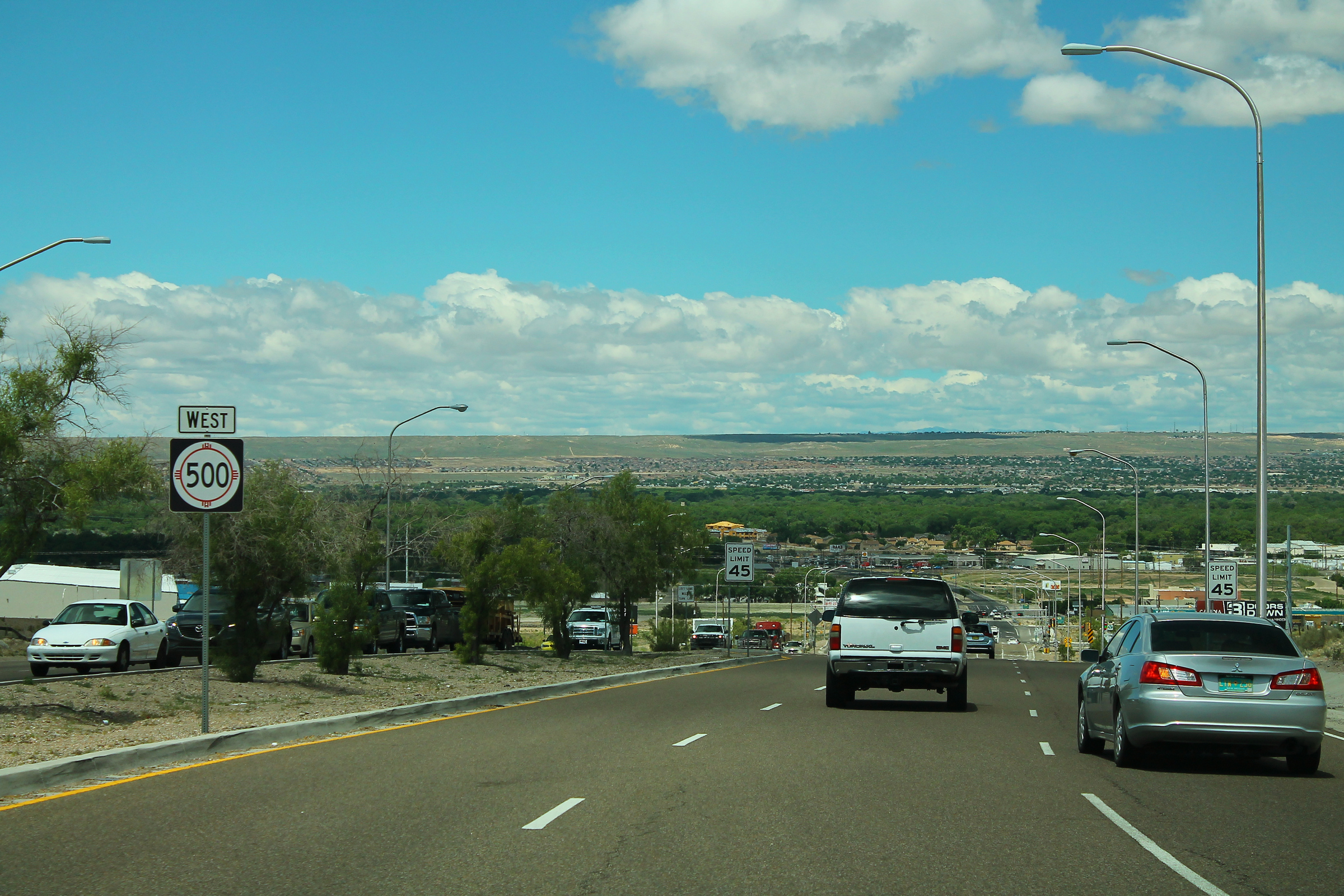

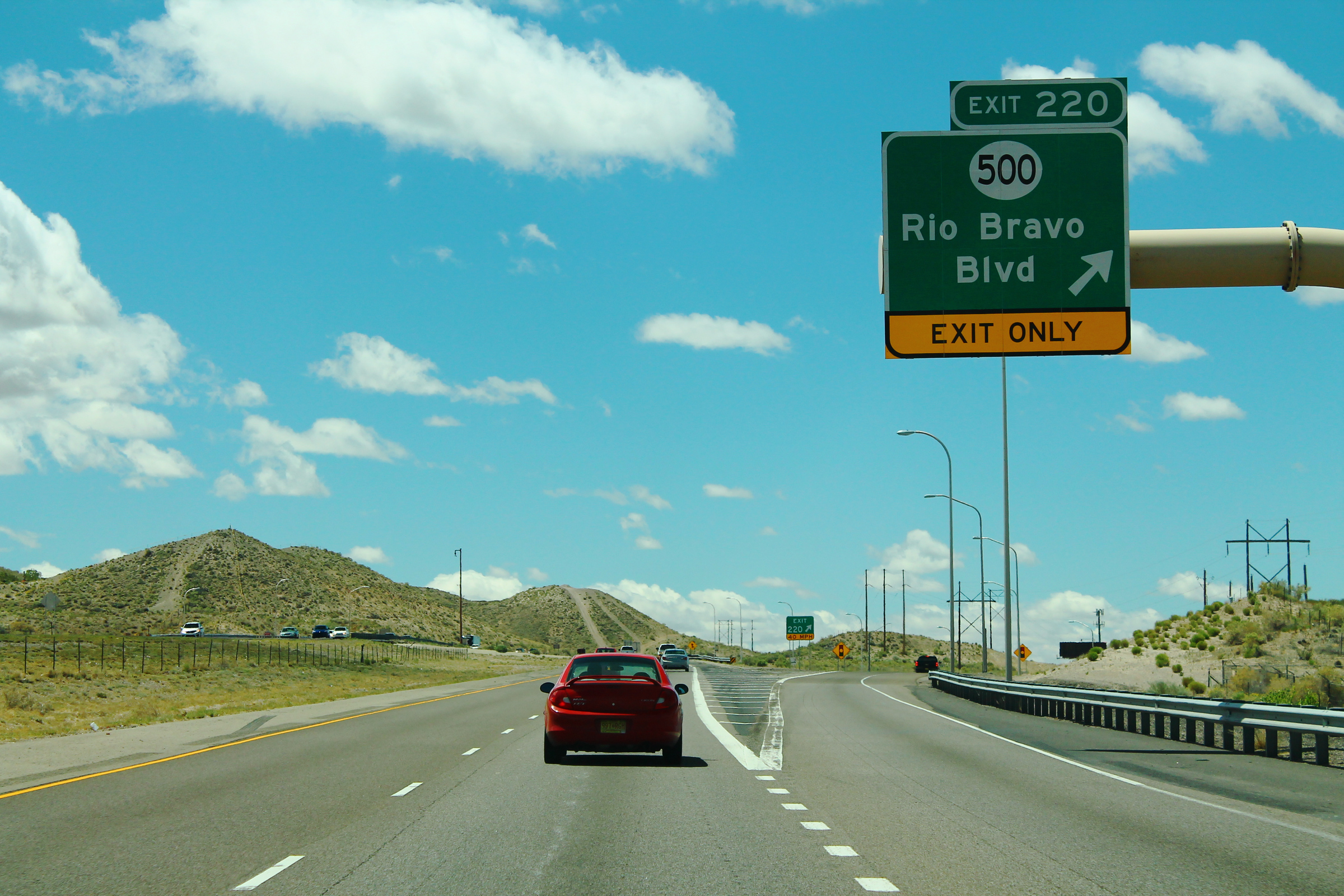
