= New Mexico State Road 313 =

State highway in Bernalillo and Sandoval counties in New Mexico, US

State Road 313
- Camino del Pueblo
- NM 313 highlighted in red

Route information
- Maintained by NMDOT
- Length: 17.091 mi (27.505 km)

Major junctions
- South end: NM 556 in Albuquerque
- US 550 in Bernalillo
- North end: End of state maintenance in San Felipe Pueblo

Location
- Country: United States
- State: New Mexico
- Counties: Bernalillo, Sandoval

Highway system
- New Mexico State Highway System; Interstate; US; State; Scenic
← NM 312	→ NM 314

State Road 313 (NM 313) is a 17.091-mile-long (27.505 km) state highway in the US state of New Mexico. NM 313's southern terminus is at NM 556 in Albuquerque, and the northern terminus is at the end of state maintenance in San Felipe Pueblo. Much of the route is an old routing of U.S. Route 85.

== Route description ==
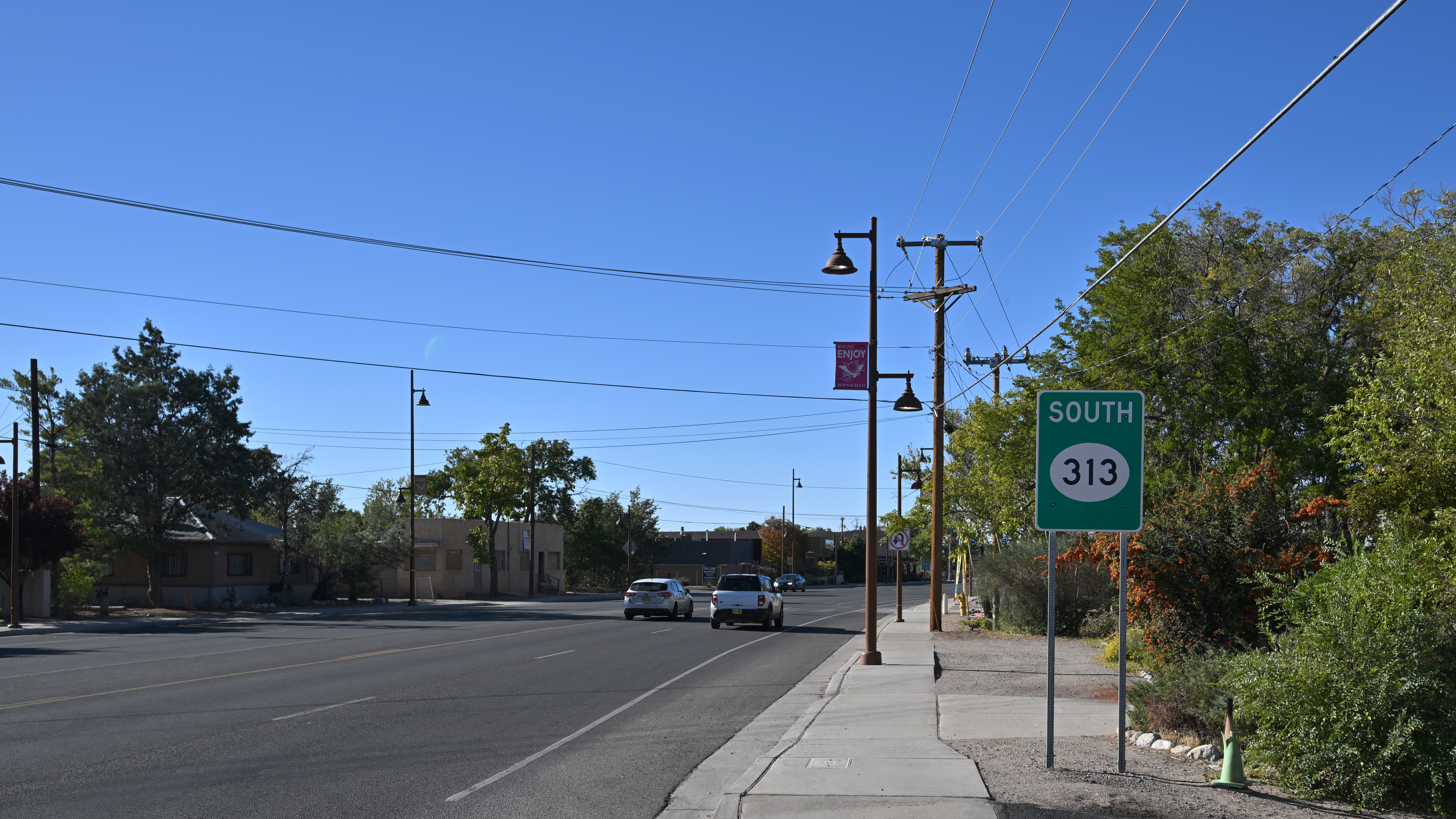
New Mexico State Road 313 in Bernalillo, NM

NM 313 begins at a roundabout intersection with NM 556 in far northern Bernalillo County, within the Sandia Pueblo and just outside the city limits of Albuquerque. The route runs to the northeast from here, along the eastern side of the Rio Grande. It enters Sandoval County, passing through Pueblo of Sandia Village. The route then exits the Sandia Pueblo and enters the city of Bernalillo, where it has a junction with US 550. The route is known in this area as Camino del Pueblo. NM 313 continues to the northeast through Santa Ana Pueblo and into the city of Algodones, where NM 315 provides access to Interstate 25. The route finally ends at the end of state maintenance in San Felipe Pueblo.

== Major intersections ==
County	Location	mi	km	Destinations	Notes
Bernalillo	Albuquerque	0.000	0.000	NM 556	Southern terminus, roundabout
Sandoval	Bernalillo	6.950	11.185	NM 473 east to I-25 / US 85	Western terminus of NM 473; to I-25 exit 240
Sandoval	Bernalillo	8.290	13.341	US 550	
Sandoval	Algodones	14.580	23.464	NM 315 east to I-25 / US 85	Western terminus of NM 315; to I-25 exit 248
Sandoval	San Felipe Pueblo	17.091	27.505	End of state maintenance	Northern terminus
1.000 mi = 1.609 km; 1.000 km = 0.621 mi

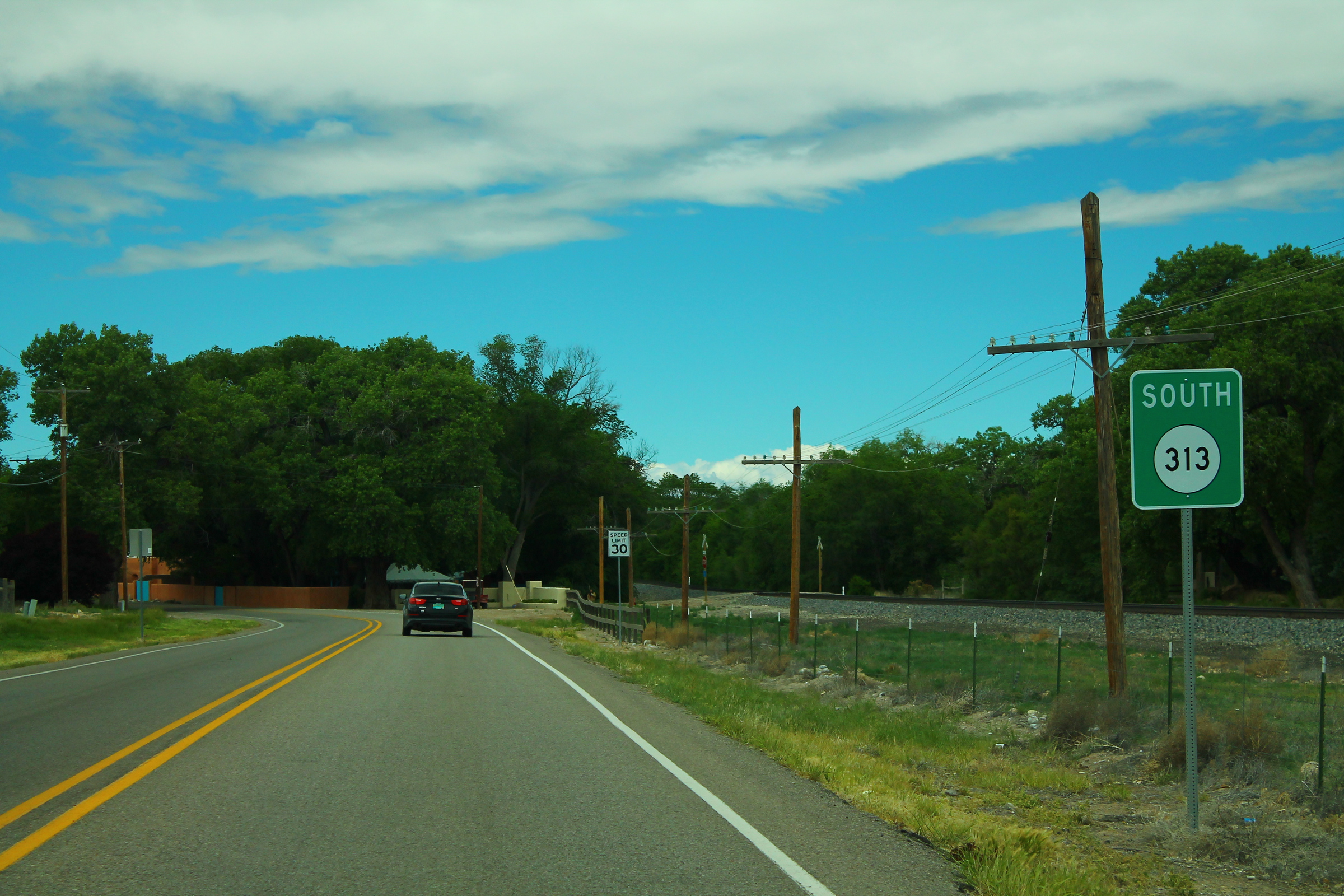
NM 313 southbound
