= Big I =

Interchange in New Mexico

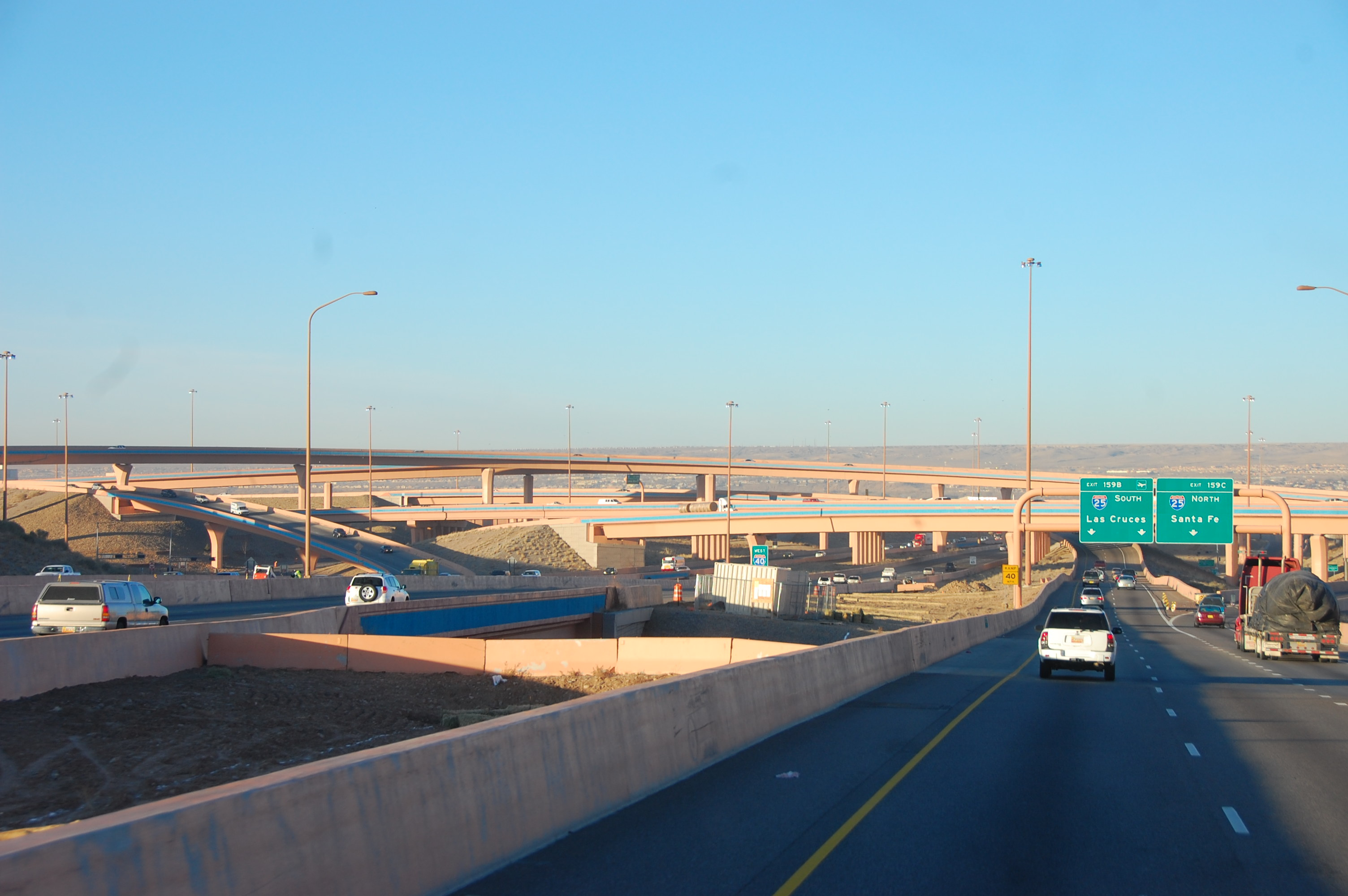
- On I-40 approaching the Big I
- Interactive map of Big I

Location
- Albuquerque, New Mexico
- Coordinates: 35.1048°N 106.6300°W
- Roads at junction: I-25; I-40

Construction
- Type: Stack interchange
- Constructed: June 2000 – May 2002 (reconstruction)
- Opened: 1966 (original); May 2002 (reconstruction)
- Maintained by: NMDOT

The Big I is a freeway interchange where Interstate 25 and Interstate 40 intersect northeast of downtown Albuquerque, New Mexico.

== Description ==
The Big I is a complex stack interchange located in central Albuquerque, New Mexico. The interchange, reconstructed between 2000 and 2002, is the busiest in the state, handling an average of over 400,000 vehicles per day before the COVID-19 pandemic. The interchange accommodates traffic movements between I-25, I-40, and their associated frontage roads.

== History ==
The Big I was originally built in the mid-1960s with left exits designed to handle 60,000 vehicles per day. By the late 1990s, however, it could no longer handle Albuquerque's increasing traffic flows and needed to be replaced. Construction work on a new interchange began in June 2000 and lasted until May 2002.

The reconstruction, which was budgeted to cost $221.8 million (equivalent to $415 million in 2025), was completed at a total cost $293 million, (equivalent to $524 million in 2025), and took 23 months to complete. The reconstruction was the largest public works project ever undertaken in New Mexico, and was the winner of the 2002 President's Transportation Award for Highways from the American Association of State Highway and Transportation Officials. A survey done in 2002 showed that after the completion of the project, the hours of annual delay dropped from 16 million to just 1.1 million.

== Tumbleweed Snowman ==
Tumbleweed Snowman
- Interactive map of Tumbleweed Snowman
- Location: Albuquerque, New Mexico
- Builder: Albuquerque Metropolitan Arroyo Flood Control Authority
- Material: Tumbleweed, Recycled Materials
- Width: About 8'
- Height: 12-14'
- Opening date: 1995

Tumbleweed Snowman is a snowman made of tumbleweed installed annually at the right-of-way next to the interchange. It was first erected in 1995 by the Albuquerque Metropolitan Arroyo Flood Control Authority (AMAFCA) and has been an annual tradition to put one up every December.

It is built from three tumbleweeds and recycled material accessories. It starts on "Tumbleweed Tuesday" which is the Tuesday following Thanksgiving. By August, AMAFCA employees start to look for tumbleweeds they can use for their snowman. They weld their 3 tumbleweeds together on a stand to protect it from windstorms, and the snowman stands tall until the first week of January. The AMAFCA hat they use for this snowman is a 55 Gallon steel pot. The scarf around the snowman is made by an AMAFCA construction employee's mother in-law.
