= New Mexico State Road 45 =

State highway in Bernalillo County, New Mexico, United States

State Road 45
- Coors Boulevard
- NM-45 highlighted in red

Route information
- Maintained by NMDOT
- Length: 22.918 mi (36.883 km)

Major junctions
- South end: NM 314 / NM 317 in Isleta Pueblo
- NM 500 in Albuquerque; I-40 in Albuquerque; NM 423 in Albuquerque; NM 448 in Albuquerque
- North end: NM 528 in Albuquerque

Location
- Country: United States
- State: New Mexico
- Counties: Bernalillo

Highway system
- New Mexico State Highway System; Interstate; US; State; Scenic
← NM 42	→ NM 47

New Mexico State Road 45 (NM 45) is a 22.918-mile-long (36.883 km) State Highway in the US state of New Mexico that runs parallel to the Rio Grande from the Pueblo of Isleta, through Albuquerque, and to the southern boundary of Rio Rancho.

== Route description ==
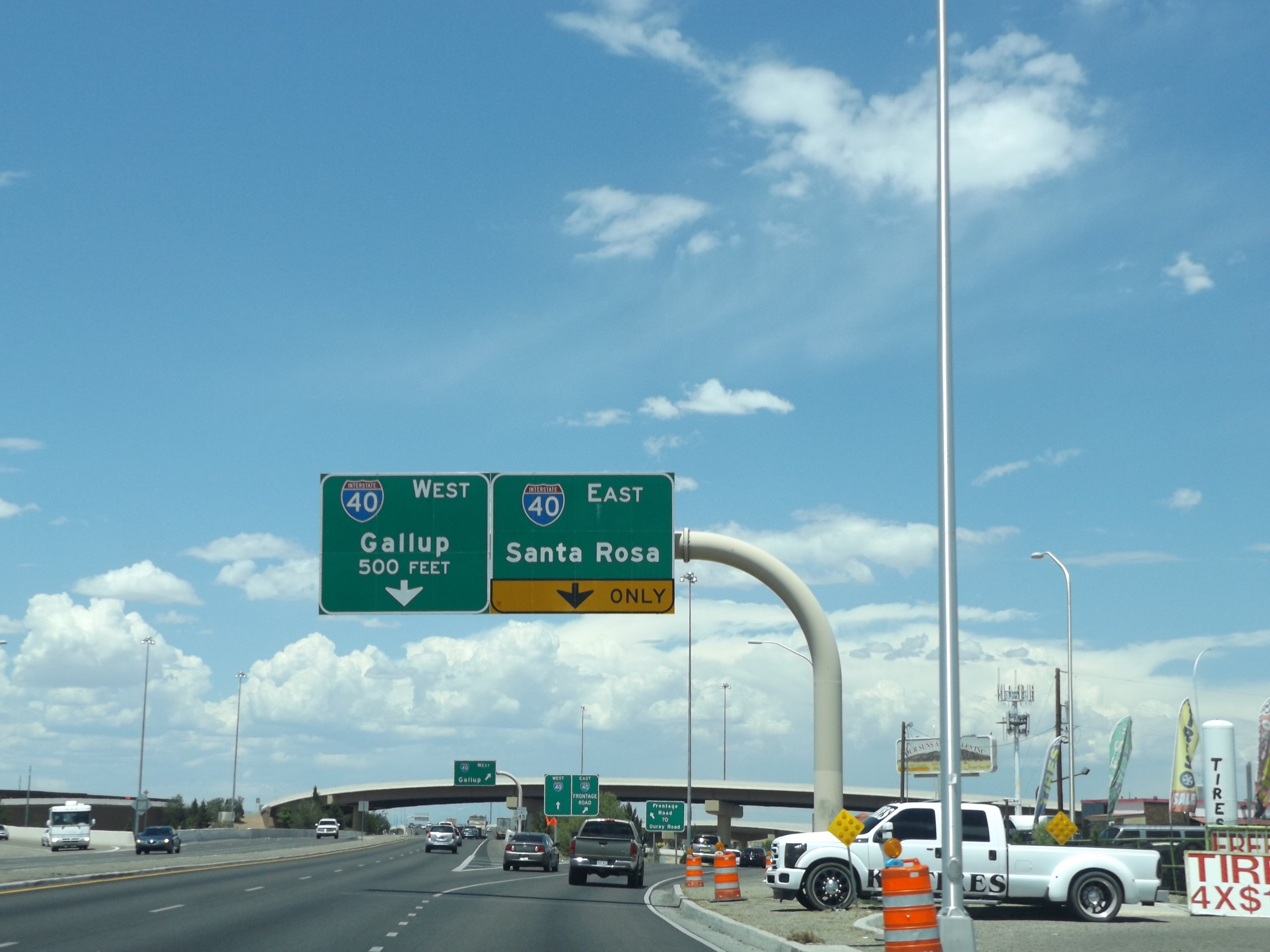
NM 45 northbound approaching I-40

NM 45 begins at a junction with NM 314/NM 317 in the Isleta Village. NM 45 runs north, passing under Interstate 25 and leaving the Isleta Pueblo and entering the South Valley, an unincorporated community just outside Albuquerque. Throughout the city, NM 45 is signed as Coors Boulevard, a major north-south expressway on Albuquerque's westside. NM 45 runs along the westside of the South Valley before entering Albuquerque city limits and meeting NM 500 at Rio Bravo Boulevard/Sen. Dennis Chaves Boulevard. NM 45 then continues northwest, leaving city limits before re-entering at Bridge Blvd before meeting Central Avenue. The road continues soon junctions Interstate 40 and continues north before turning northeast to follow the Rio Grande. NM 45 soon meets NM 423 before turning northwest around the Cottonwood Mall, now signed as the Coors By-Pass. NM 45 also serves as the southern terminus of NM 448. NM 45 terminates just south of Rio Rancho as it merges into NM 528.

== History ==
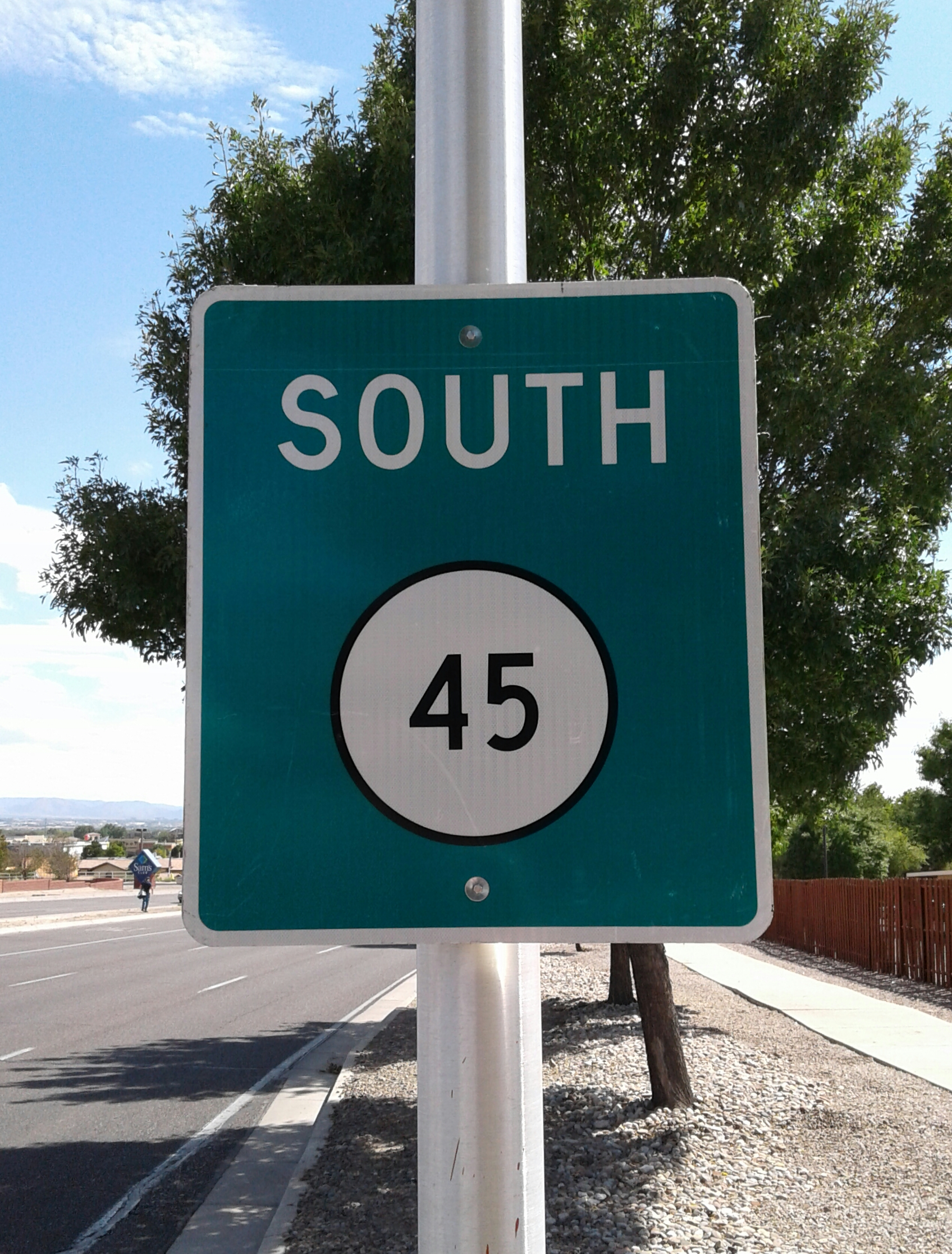
A road sign from southbound NM 45

Until 2012, the northernmost portion of this route traversed Old Coors Road between Coors Boulevard and Central Avenue (Historic U.S. Route 66). NM 45 has since been realigned to Coors Boulevard and Coors By-Pass and extended north of Central Avenue, replacing the portion of NM 448 between St. Joseph's Drive and Coors By-Pass, and turning over Old Coors Road to local control to be realigned with Yucca Drive.

Construction on the southern terminus completed in late 2025 which converted the junctions of NM 45, NM 314, and NM 317 to a four point intersection with a traffic signal. This junction historically was skewed and confusing with varied speed limits and a lack of turning lanes at the junction with NM 314, causing backups onto the highway. NM 45 now terminates at NM 314/NM317 as opposed to only NM 314.

== Major intersections ==
The entire route is in Bernalillo County.

Location	mi	km	Destinations	Notes
Pueblo of Isleta	0.000	0.000	NM 314 / NM 317 west to I-25 / US 85	Southern terminus
South Valley–Albuquerque line	8.850	14.243	NM 500 (Rio Bravo Boulevard/Sen. Dennis Chavez Boulevard)	
Albuquerque	14.327	23.057	I-40 – Santa Rosa, Gallup	I-40 exit 155
Albuquerque	20.308	32.683	NM 423 (Paseo del Norte Blvd)	Single-point urban interchange
Albuquerque	21.378	34.405	NM 448 north (Coors Boulevard) to NM 528	Southern terminus of NM 448
Albuquerque	22.918	36.883	NM 528	Northern terminus, interchange, southbound exit and northbound entrance only
Albuquerque	1.000 mi = 1.609 km; 1.000 km = 0.621 mi: Incomplete access			

== See also ==
- List of state roads in New Mexico
