= New Mexico State Road 448 =

State highway in New Mexico, United States

State Road 448
- Coors Rd; Corrales Rd
- NM 448 highlighted in red

Route information
- Maintained by NMDOT
- Length: 13.01 mi (20.94 km)

Major junctions
- South end: NM 45 (Coors By-Pass) in Albuquerque, NM
- NM 528 (Alameda Blvd) in Albuquerque, NM
- North end: NM 528 (Pat D'Arco Hwy) in Rio Rancho, NM

Location
- Country: United States
- State: New Mexico

Highway system
- New Mexico State Highway System; Interstate; US; State; Scenic
← NM 446	→ NM 450

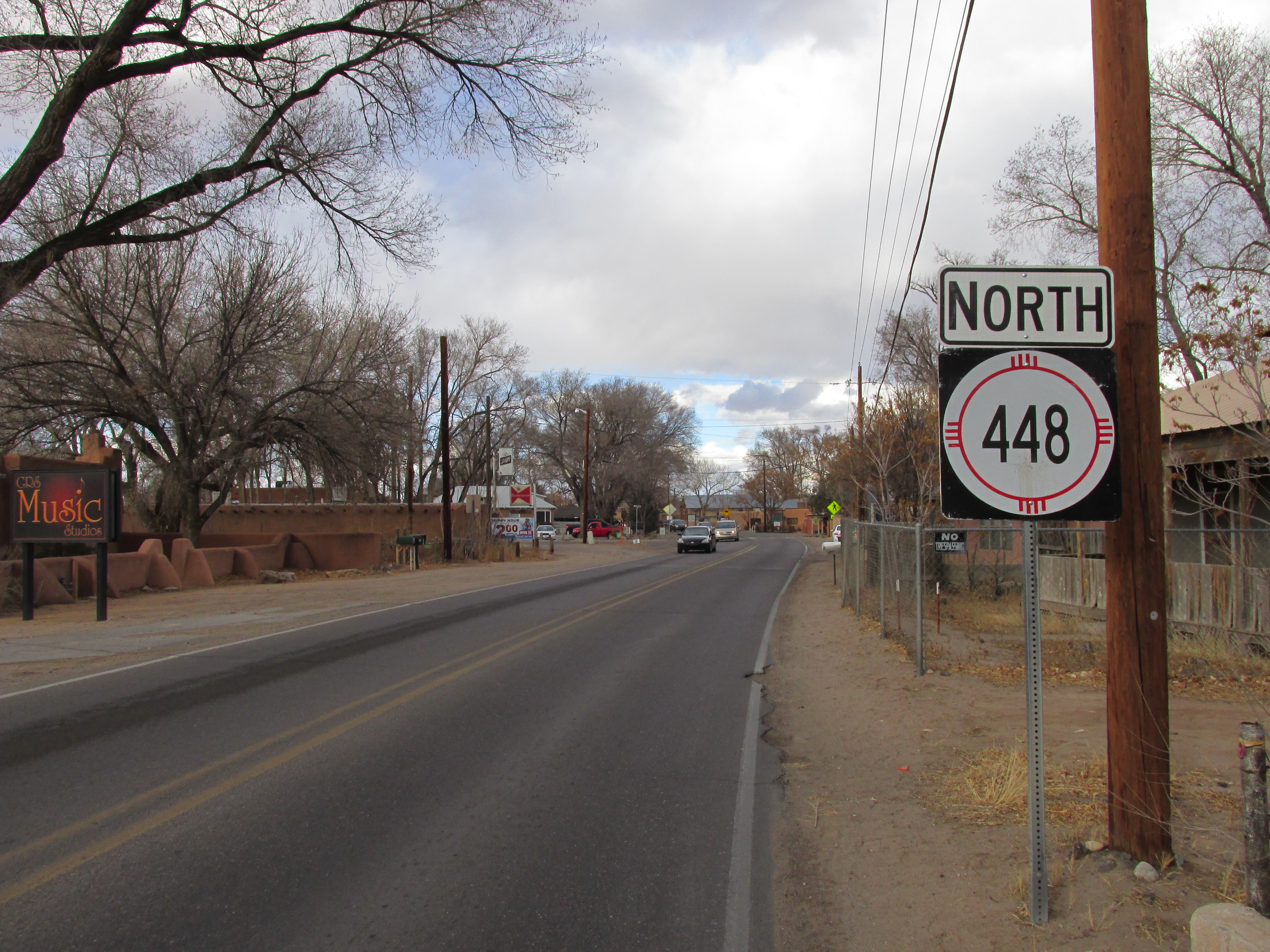
NM 448 northbound in Corrales.

New Mexico State Road 448 (NM 448) is a 13.01-mile-long (20.94 km) state highway in Sandoval County and Bernalillo County, New Mexico. NM 448 is assigned as Coors Road inside of Albuquerque, and is assigned as Corrales Road in Corrales, New Mexico. The highway's northern terminus is at an intersection with NM 528 (Pat D'Arco Highway) in Rio Rancho. The highway then proceeds east then south through Corrales via Corrales Road. After leaving Corrales, it intersects with NM 528 again. The highway's southern terminus is at NM 45.

== Route description ==
NM 448 begins at the three-way intersection between Coors Road, Coors Boulevard, and Coors By-Pass in northwestern Albuquerque, heading to the north-northeast on Coors Road. Shortly after intersecting NM 528 at Alameda Boulevard, the route crosses from Bernalillo County into Sandoval County, where it is known as Corrales Road. The route proceeds northeast through Corrales before turning to the northwest. It enters the city limits of Rio Rancho before coming to its northern terminus at the Pat D'Arco Highway (NM 528).

== History ==
Until 2012, this route also included a portion of Coors Boulevard between St. Joseph's Drive and its current southern terminus at Coors By-Pass. This segment has since been replaced by NM 45, which now includes all of Coors Boulevard south of Coors By-Pass; the portion of Coors Boulevard between Old Coors Road and St. Joseph's Drive was previously locally maintained.

== Major intersections ==
County	Location	mi	km	Destinations	Notes
Bernalillo	Albuquerque	0.000	0.000	NM 45 (Coors Boulevard)	Southern terminus
Bernalillo	Albuquerque	0.900	1.448	NM 528 (Alameda Blvd.)	
Sandoval	Rio Rancho	7.670	12.344	NM 528 (Pat D'Arco Highway)	Northern terminus
1.000 mi = 1.609 km; 1.000 km = 0.621 mi

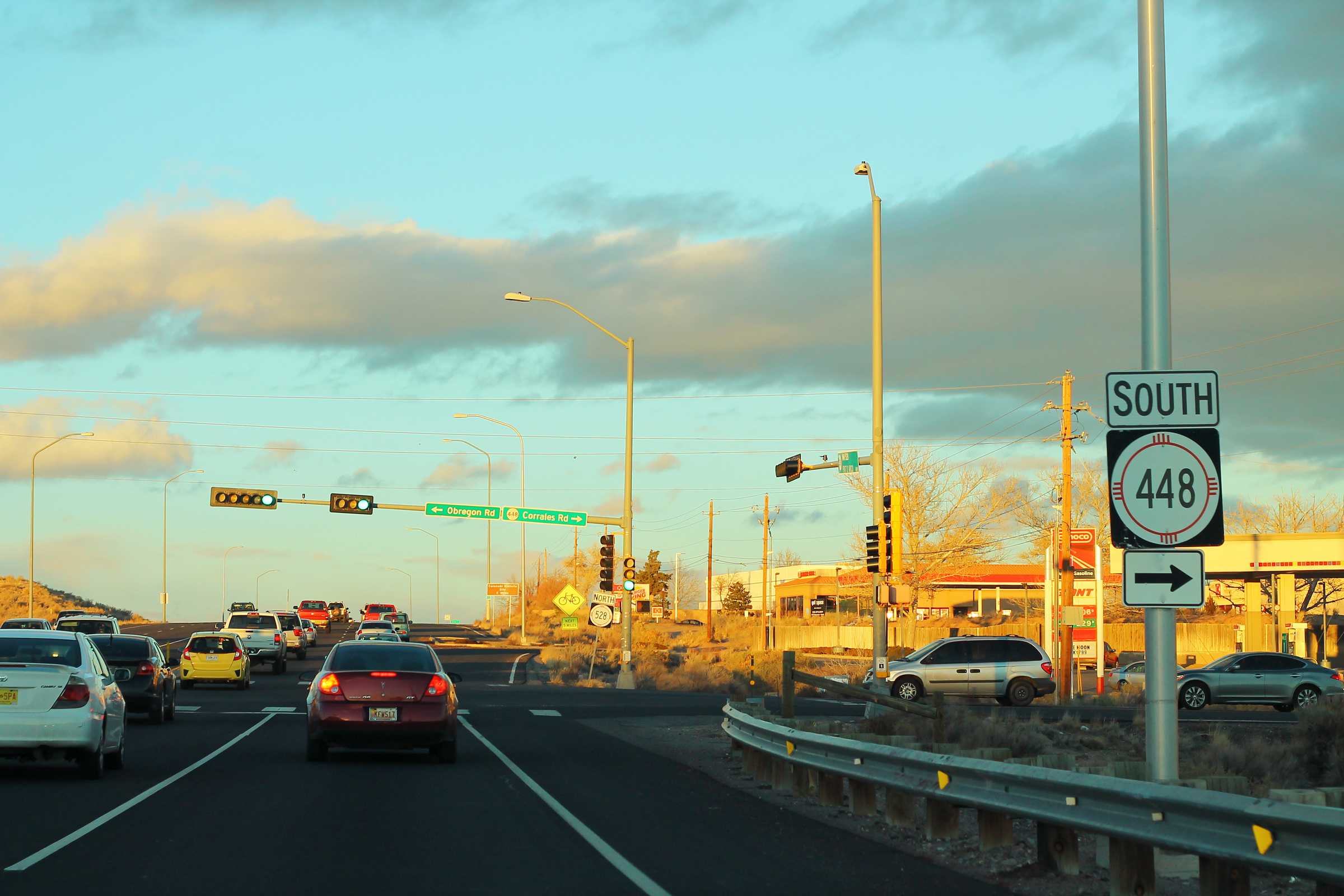

== See also ==
- List of state roads in New Mexico
