= New Mexico State Road 556 =

State highway in New Mexico, United States

State Road 556
- Tramway Boulevard
- NM 556 highlighted in red

Route information
- Maintained by NMDOT
- Length: 15.402 mi (24.787 km)

Major junctions
- South end: NM 333 / Historic US 66 in Albuquerque
- I-40 in Albuquerque; NM 423 in Albuquerque; I-25 in Albuquerque; NM 313 in Albuquerque
- North end: NM 47 in Albuquerque

Location
- Country: United States
- State: New Mexico
- Counties: Bernalillo

Highway system
- New Mexico State Highway System; Interstate; US; State; Scenic
← NM 555	→ NM 562

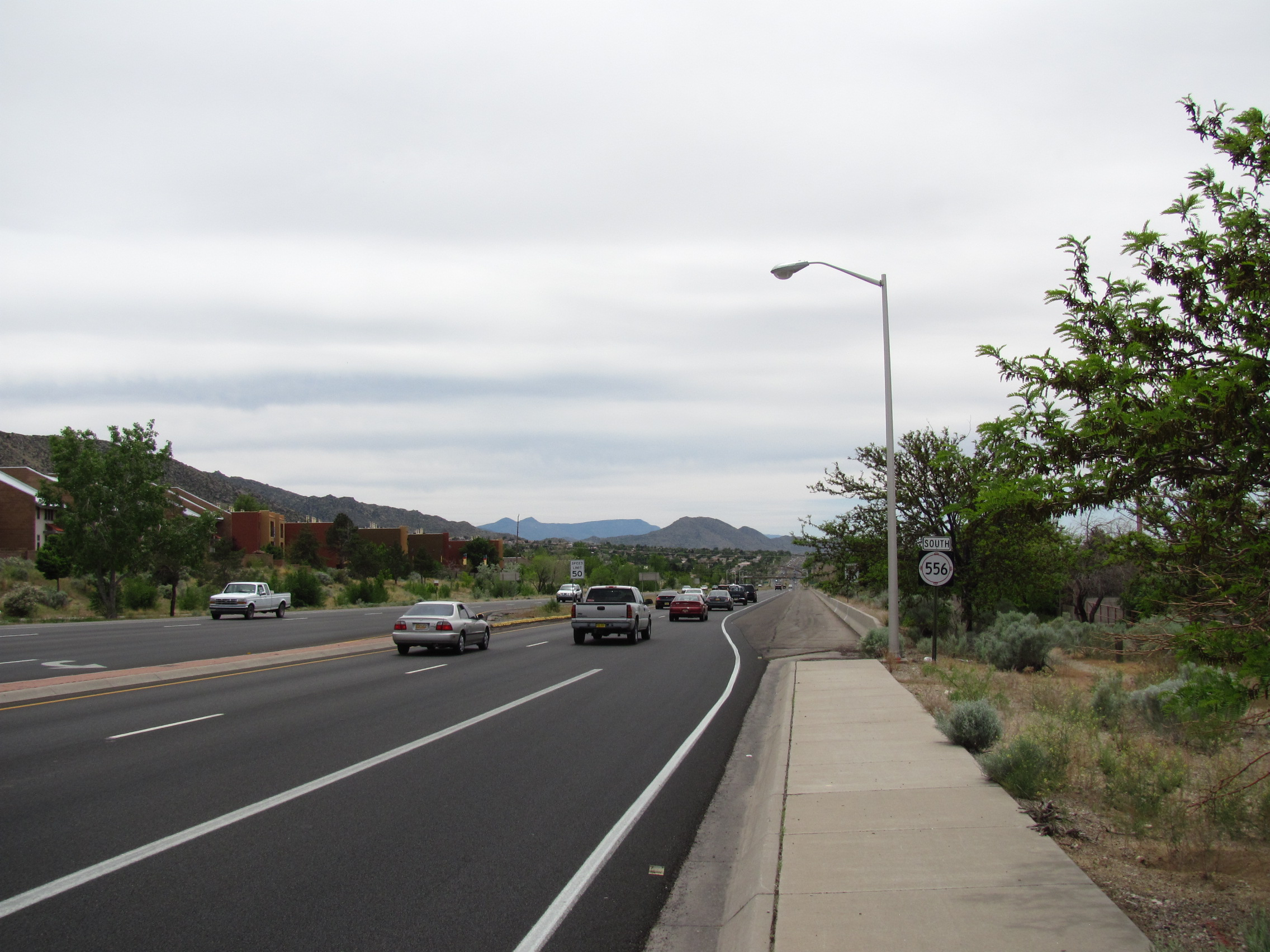
NM 556/Tramway Boulevard southbound at Montgomery Boulevard in Albuquerque

New Mexico State Road 556 (NM 556) is a 15.402-mile-long (24.787 km) state highway entirely within Bernalillo County, New Mexico. For most of its length, NM 556 is signed as Tramway Boulevard in Albuquerque, although from I-25 to its northern terminus at NM 47, NM 556 is signed as Roy Road. The highway's southern terminus is at an intersection with NM 333 and Historic U.S. Route 66 (Historic US 66), or Central Avenue. The highway then moves north intersecting with Interstate 40 (I-40). The highway is a divided four-lane road until its intersection with Tramway Road. After that, the highway narrows to two lanes and takes a westerly turn to intersect with I-25. The highway's northern terminus is at an intersection with NM 47.

== Route description ==
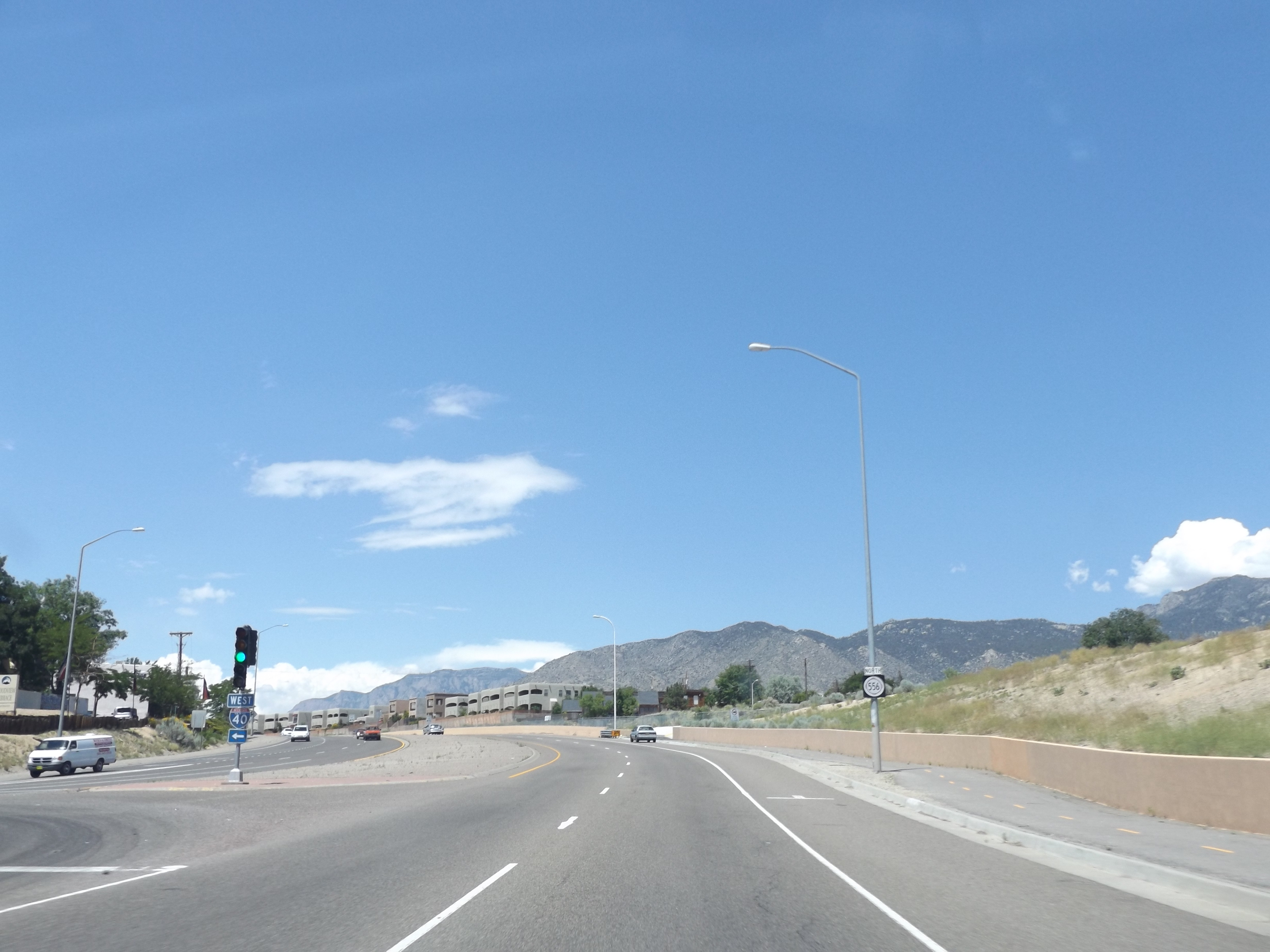
NM 556 northbound at the intersection with I-40

State Road 556 begins at Tramway Boulevard's intersection with Central Avenue, which carries NM 333 and is also the historic route of US 66. NM 556 proceeds north from this intersection, passing through a half-diamond interchange with Interstate 40. The route travels north through the northeastern areas of Albuquerque, along the base of the Sandia Mountains. This portion of the route is a four-lane divided expressway with a speed limit of 55 mph. It eventually intersects Paseo del Norte (NM 423), a major east-west arterial through northern Albuquerque, before coming to a stop sign at Tramway Road, which provides access to the Sandia Peak Tramway. Here, NM 556 becomes a two-lane undivided road and turns to the west as Tramway Road. After crossing Interstate 25, the name of the route changes to Roy Road. Shortly thereafter, NM 556 comes to an end at its junction with NM 47.

== Major intersections ==
The entire route is in Albuquerque, Bernalillo County.

mi	km	Destinations	Notes
0.000	0.000	NM 47 south	Northern terminus, northern terminus of NM 47
0.407	0.655	NM 313 north	Southern terminus of NM 313
1.839	2.960	I-25 south / FR 2537	Northern terminus of FR 2537, I-25 exit 234
1.980	3.187	I-25 north / FR 2523	Northern terminus of FR 2523, I-25 exit 234
7.989	12.857	NM 423 west (Paseo Del Norte)	Eastern terminus of NM 423
15.247– 15.334	24.538– 24.678	I-40 west	I-40 westbound on and eastbound off only
15.402	24.787	Historic US 66 / NM 333 east to I-40 east	Southern terminus, western terminus of NM 333, I-40 exit 167
15.402	24.787	Tramway Boulevard	Continuation beyond Historic US 66 and NM 333
1.000 mi = 1.609 km; 1.000 km = 0.621 mi: Incomplete access
