= New Mexico State Road 528 =

Highway in New Mexico

State Road 528
- NM 528 highlighted in red

Route information
- Maintained by NMDOT
- Length: 13.381 mi (21.535 km)

Major junctions
- South end: I-25 / US 85 in Albuquerque
- NM 47 in Albuquerque; NM 448 in Albuquerque and Rio Rancho; NM 45 in Albuquerque
- North end: US 550 in Rio Rancho

Location
- Country: United States
- State: New Mexico
- Counties: Bernalillo, Sandoval

Highway system
- New Mexico State Highway System; Interstate; US; State; Scenic
← NM 527	→ NM 529

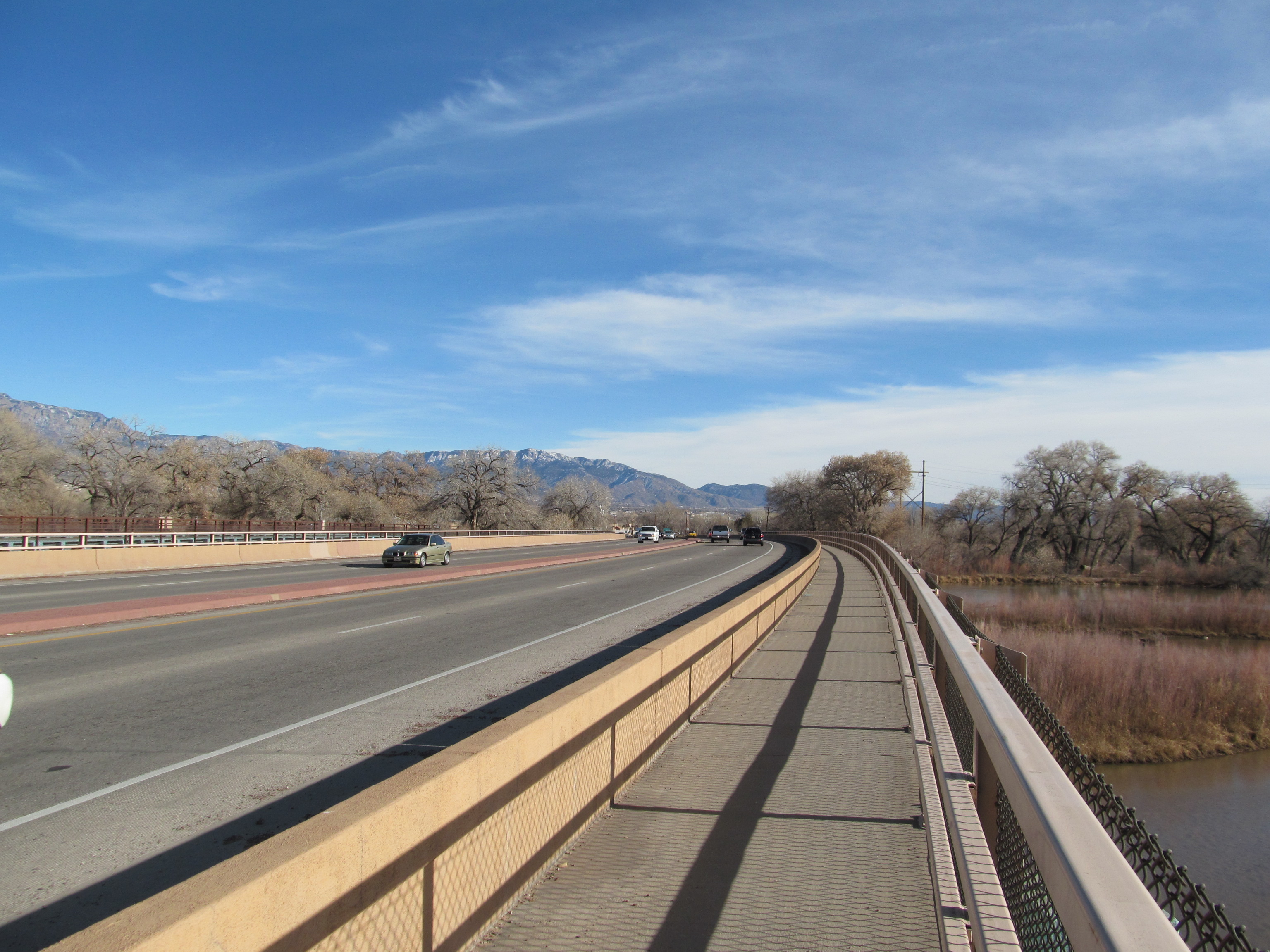
Eastbound over the Rio Grande

New Mexico State Road 528 (NM 528) is a 15.355-mile-long (24.711 km) state highway in Sandoval County and Bernalillo County, New Mexico. NM 528 is signed as Alameda Blvd. In Rio Rancho, the road is also known as Pat D'Arco Highway, named after former mayor of Rio Rancho Pat D'Arco. It is an L-shaped route signed north-south in Sandoval County and east-west in Bernalillo County.

== Route description ==
NM 528 begins on the east side of a diamond interchange with Interstate 25 (I-25) at Frontage road 2523 (FR 2523) in northern Albuquerque in Bernalillo County. It then heads west along Alameda Boulevard where it intersects 2nd Street NW, which carries NM 47. The route crosses the Rio Grande and then turns to the northwest. At Coors Boulevard, it intersects NM 448. The highway then turns north at its junction with NM 45 and enters Rio Rancho in Sandoval County.

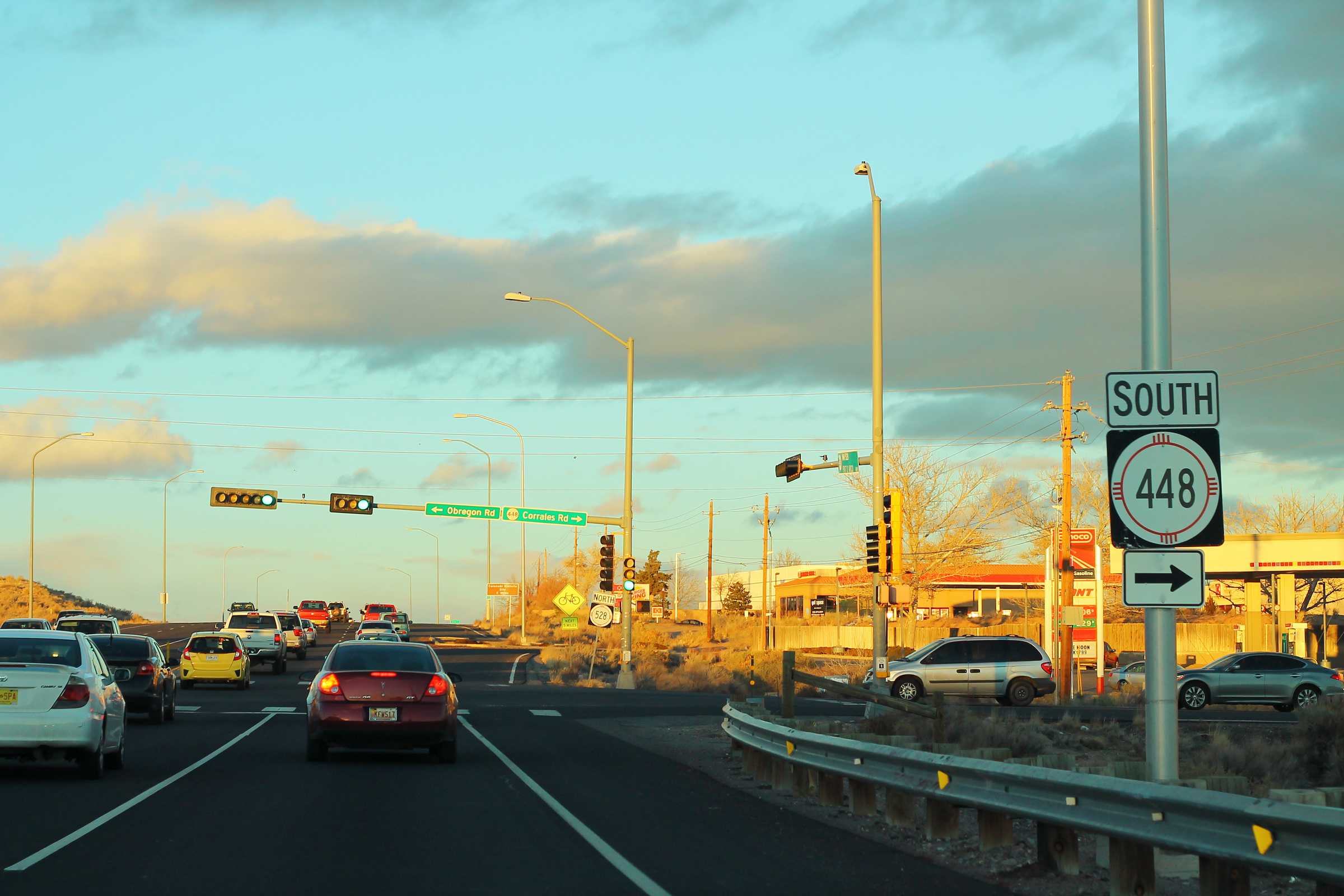
NM 528 approaching its junction with NM 448

Through Rio Rancho, NM 528, known as Pat D'Arco Highway, is a major north–south street. It serves major retailers, restaurants, and other businesses. Feeder streets which connect adjacent neighborhoods cross Pat D'Arco Highway at regular intervals. It meets NM 448 again near its own northern end. The route ends at U.S. Route 550 (US 550) on the northern edge of Rio Rancho.

== Major intersections ==
County	Location	mi	km	Destinations	Notes
Bernalillo	Albuquerque	0.000	0.000	Alameda Boulevard	Continuation beyond FR 2523
Bernalillo	Albuquerque	0.000	0.000	I-25 north / FR 2523 (Pan American East Freeway Northbound)	Eastern terminus, I-25 exit 233
Bernalillo	Albuquerque	0.100	0.161	I-25 south / FR 2523 (Pan American West Freeway Southbound)	I-25 exit 233
Bernalillo	Albuquerque	1.956	3.148	NM 47 (2nd Street)	
Bernalillo	Albuquerque	4.209	6.774	NM 448 (Coors Boulevard)	
Bernalillo	Albuquerque	5.273	8.486	NM 45 (Coors Bypass)	Northern terminus of NM 45, access from southbound NM 528 only
Sandoval	Rio Rancho	10.647	17.135	NM 448 south (Corrales Road)	Northern terminus of NM 448
Sandoval	Rio Rancho	13.381	21.535	US 550	Northern terminus
1.000 mi = 1.609 km; 1.000 km = 0.621 mi
