= New Mexico State Road 147 =

State highway in New Mexico, United States

State Road 147

Route information
- Maintained by NMDOT
- Length: 1.070 mi (1.722 km)

Major junctions
- West end: NM 314 in Isleta Village Proper
- East end: NM 47 in Isleta Pueblo

Location
- Country: United States
- State: New Mexico
- Counties: Bernalillo

Highway system
- New Mexico State Highway System; Interstate; US; State; Scenic
← NM 146	→ NM 150

State Road 147 (NM 147) is a 1.07-mile-long (1.72 km) state highway in the US state of New Mexico. NM 147's western terminus is at NM 314 in Isleta Village Proper, and the eastern terminus is at NM 47 in Isleta Pueblo.

== Major intersections ==
The entire route is in Bernalillo County.

Location	mi	km	Destinations	Notes
Isleta Village Proper	0.000	0.000	NM 314	Western terminus
Isleta Pueblo	1.070	1.722	NM 47	Eastern terminus
1.000 mi = 1.609 km; 1.000 km = 0.621 mi
