= New Mexico State Road 263 =

State highway in New Mexico, United States

State Road 263

Route information
- Maintained by NMDOT
- Length: 5.72 mi (9.21 km)

Major junctions
- Southern end: NM 47 near Los Lunas
- Northern end: NM 6 in Los Lunas

Location
- Country: United States
- State: New Mexico
- Counties: Valencia

Highway system
- New Mexico State Highway System; Interstate; US; State; Scenic
← NM 262	→ NM 264

State Road 263 (NM 263) is a 5.72-mile-long (9.21 km) state highway in the US state of New Mexico. NM 263's southern terminus is at NM 47 south of Los Lunas, and the northern terminus is at NM 6 in Los Lunas.

== Major intersections ==
The entire route is in Valencia County.

Location	mi	km	Destinations	Notes
	0.000	0.000	NM 47	Southern terminus
Los Lunas	5.035	8.103	NM 47	
Los Lunas	5.720	9.205	NM 6	Northern terminus
1.000 mi = 1.609 km; 1.000 km = 0.621 mi
