= Interstate 25 in New Mexico =

Section of Interstate Highway in New Mexico, United States

Interstate 25
- I-25 and US 85 highlighted in red

Route information
- Maintained by NMDOT
- Length: 462.124 mi (743.716 km)
- Existed: 1957–present
- NHS: Entire route

Major junctions
- South end: I-10 / US 85 / US 180 in Las Cruces
- US 70 in Las Cruces; US 380 near San Antonio; US 60 from Socorro to Bosque; NM 6 in Los Lunas; I-40 in Albuquerque; US 550 in Bernalillo; US 84 / US 285 in Santa Fe; US 84 in Las Vegas; US 64 / US 87 in Raton
- North end: I-25 / US 85 / US 87 at the Colorado state line near Raton

Location
- Country: United States
- State: New Mexico
- Counties: Doña Ana, Sierra, Socorro, Valencia, Bernalillo, Sandoval, Santa Fe, San Miguel, Mora, Colfax

Highway system
- Interstate Highway System; Main; Auxiliary; Suffixed; Business; Future; New Mexico State Highway System; Interstate; US; State; Scenic
← NM 24	I-25	→ NM 25
← US 84	US 85	→ US 87

Interstate 25 (I-25) in the US state of New Mexico follows the north–south corridor through Albuquerque and Santa Fe. It replaced U.S. Route 85 (US 85), which is no longer signed, but still exists in route logs sharing most of the I-25 alignment. I-25 starts in New Mexico at an interchange with I-10 in Las Cruces and extends roughly 460 miles (740 km) before reaching Colorado. I-25 passes through principally rural land through central New Mexico and passes through or near the cities of Las Cruces, Truth or Consequences, Socorro, Belen, Albuquerque, Santa Fe, Las Vegas, and Raton.

== Route description ==
I-25 begins at I-10's exit 144 in Las Cruces (elevation 4,000 feet (1,200 m)), just south of the New Mexico State University (NMSU) campus. I-25 is concurrent with US 85 at this point, and carries US 85 concurrently for the remainder of its run in New Mexico, save for a 4-mile (6.4 km) through Las Vegas where unsigned US 85 follows Interstate 25 Business (I-25 Bus., Business Loop 25) through the town. Immediately, the Interstate passes east of the NMSU campus, and the next three exits provide access to the city. The first exit is University Avenue, which provides access to NMSU. The final exit in Las Cruces is US 70. Upon exiting the city, the speed limit increases by 10 mph (16 km/h) to 75 mph (121 km/h). Before I-25 reaches Truth or Consequences and just south of Elephant Butte Reservoir State Park, it crosses over to the west side of the Rio Grande. From Las Cruces to Santa Fe I-25 follows the route of El Camino Real de Tierra Adentro.

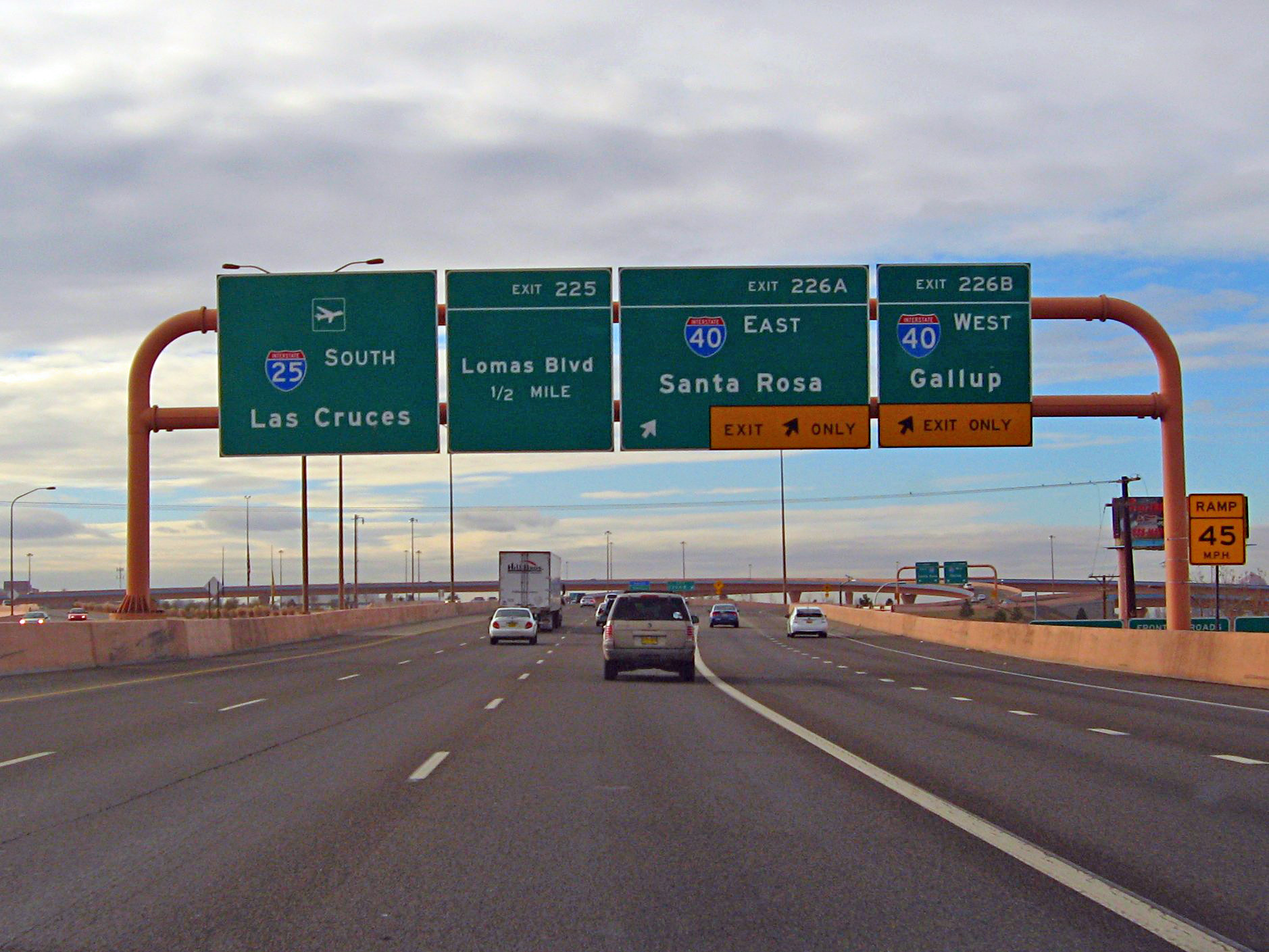
At the Big I in Albuquerque, New Mexico

South of Albuquerque near Socorro, it passes through the Bosque del Apache National Wildlife Refuge. As I-25 nears Albuquerque, it has interchanges with roads such as US 380 and a concurrency with US 60. State Road 6 (NM 6), the original US 66, meets up with I-25 in Los Lunas. Just to the south of Albuquerque, I-25 enters Isleta Pueblo where it crosses back to the east side of the Rio Grande.

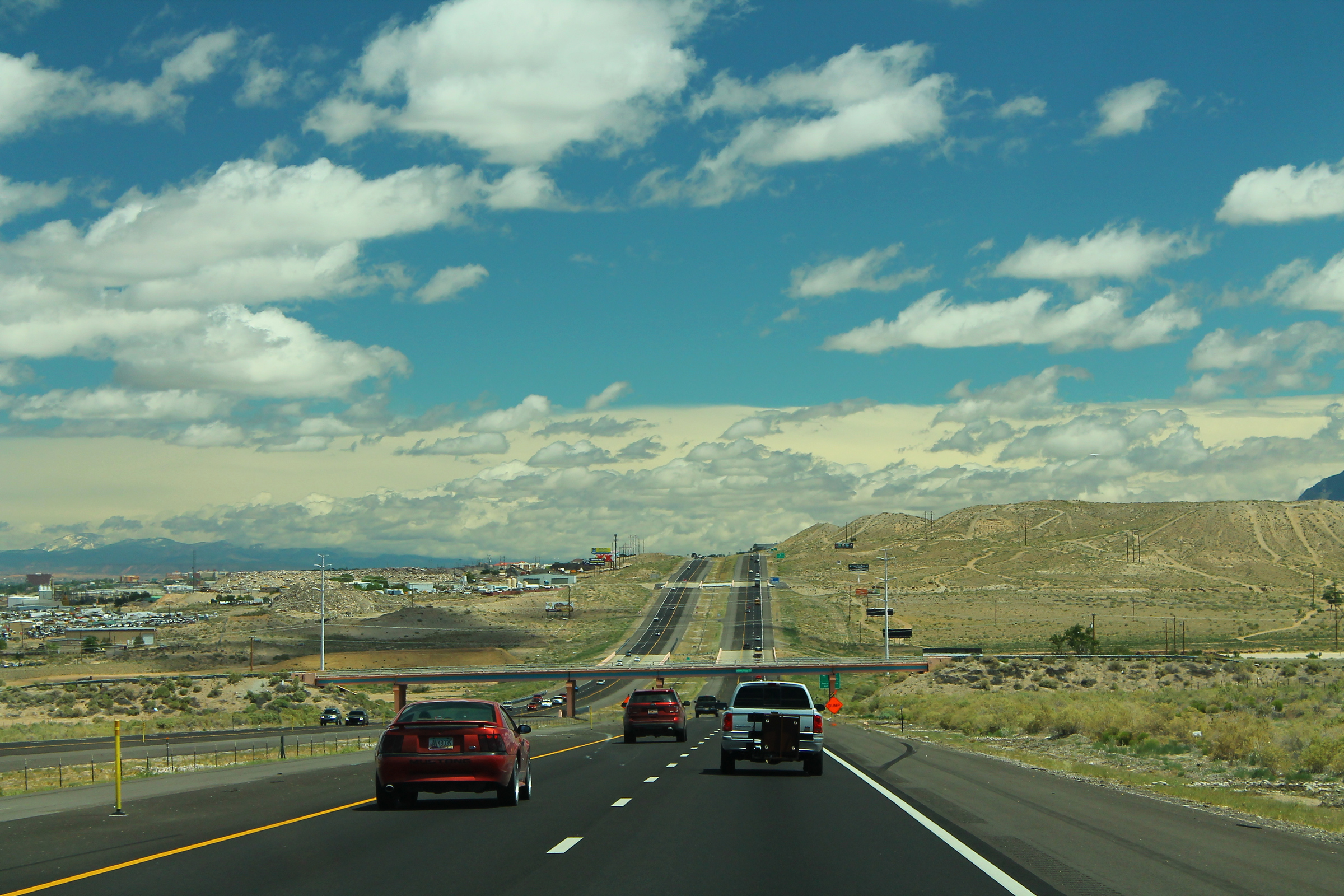
I-25 in Albuquerque

The speed limit on I-25 in Albuquerque is 65 mph (105 km/h), except for one 1.5-mile (2.4 km) 55-mile-per-hour (89 km/h) section between Gibson Boulevard and Central Avenue. Through Albuquerque, I-25 is named the Pan American Freeway and there are frequent exits to city streets. A major interchange with I-40 (which is styled as the Coronado Freeway in the city) is named the Big I. It was given an honorable mention by the United States Department of Transportation and the Federal Highway Administration for excellence in urban highway design in 2002.

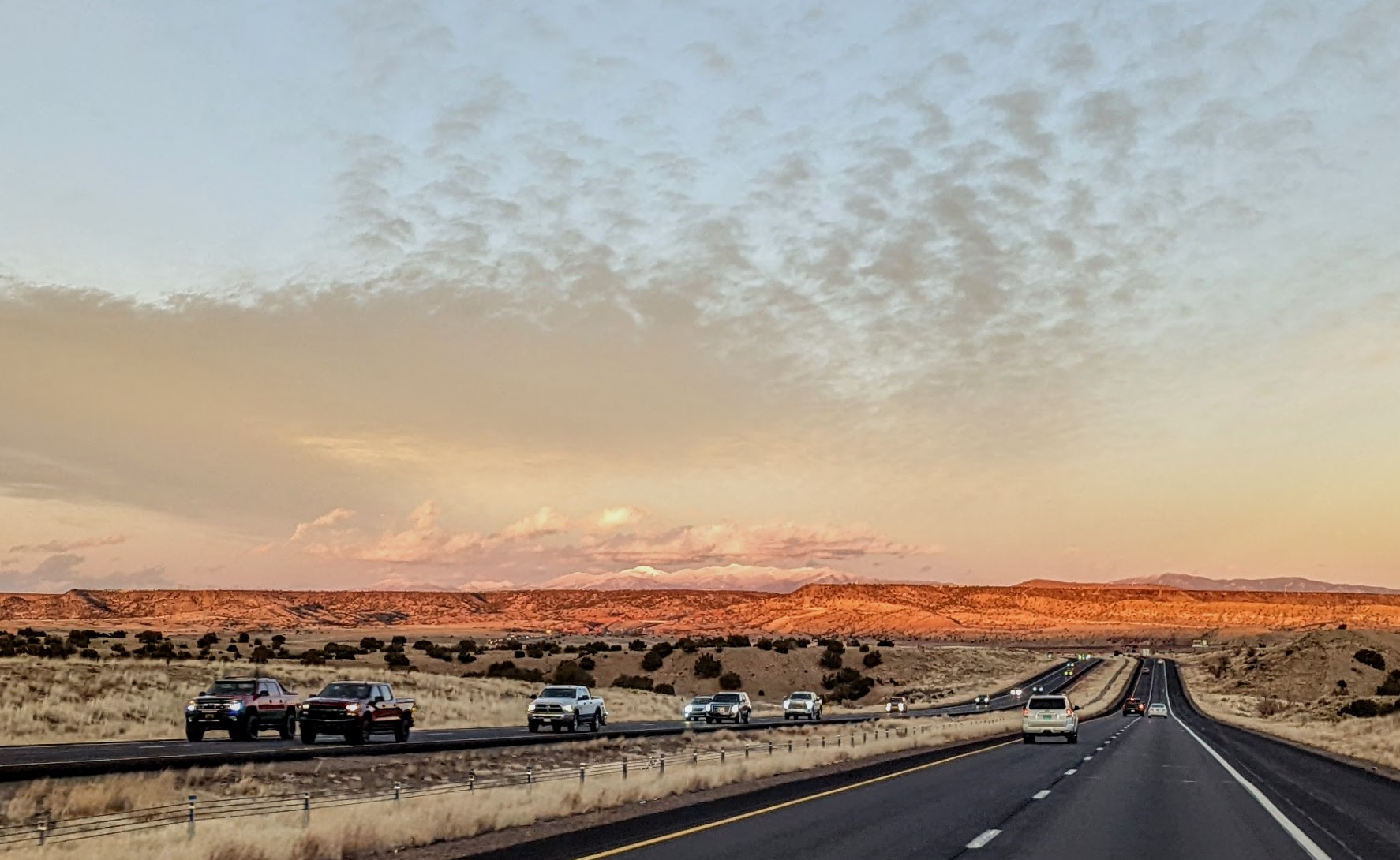
Approaching Santa Fe, New Mexico, at sunset. The Sangre de Cristo Mountains, with snow, are in the background.

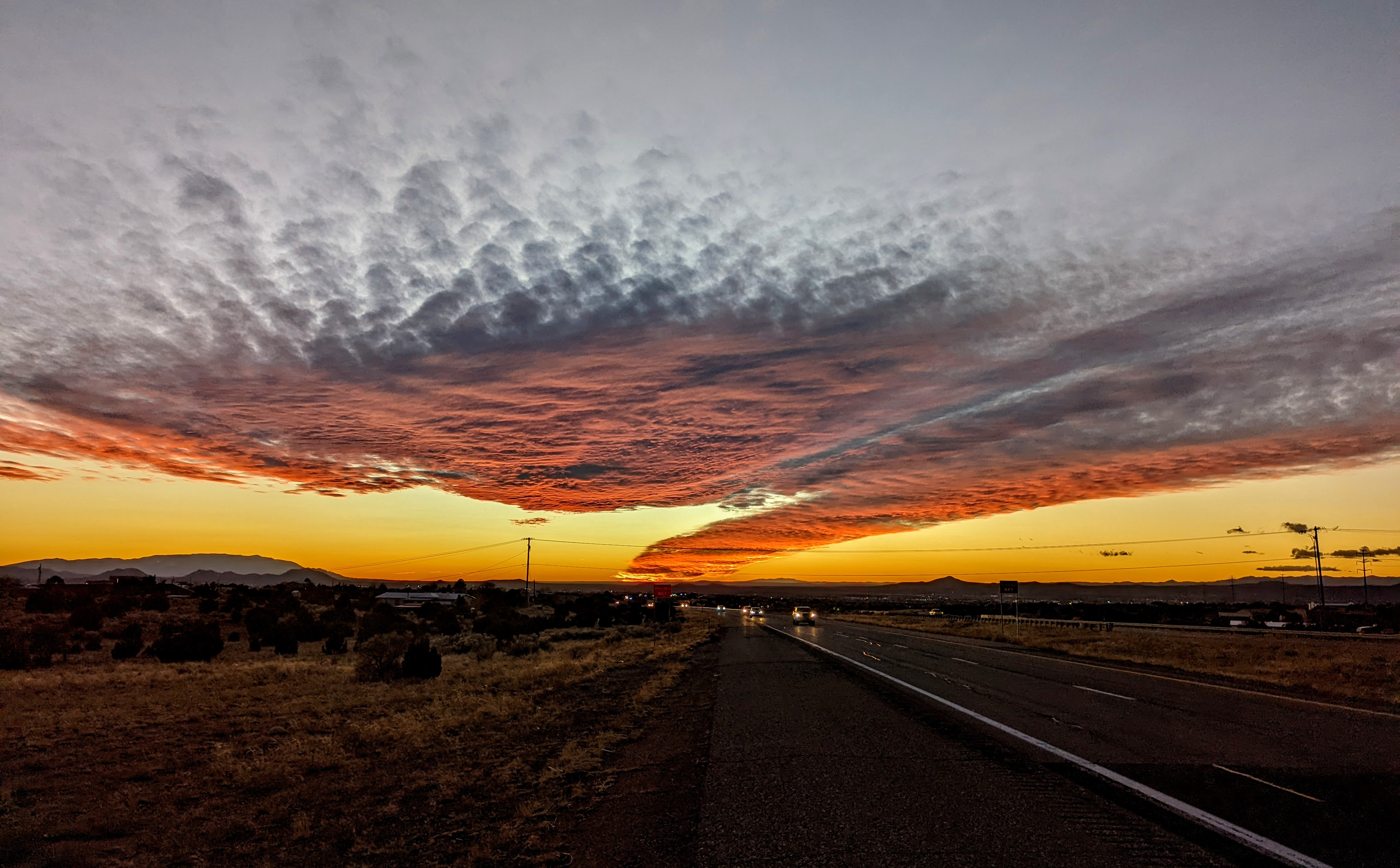
Sunset on I-25 at Santa Fe

Leaving Albuquerque, the 75-mile-per-hour (121 km/h) speed limit resumes as the freeway passes through Sandia Pueblo. After Bernalillo, I-25 passes through four more Indian Reservations (from south to north: the Pueblos of Santa Ana, San Felipe, Kewa, and Cochiti). I-25 turns to the northeast and away from the Rio Grande, alongside which it has run from its southern terminus, as it heads toward Santa Fe. It climbs out of the Rio Grande Valley at a steep hill called La Bajada 11 miles (18 km) southwest of Santa Fe.

Continuing 'northbound' at Santa Fe, I-25 heads southeast for approximately 45 miles (72 km), traveling through the Santa Fe National Forest and crossing Glorieta Pass (7,452 feet (2,271 m)). It turns north again at Blanchard toward Las Vegas. The highway maintains a north and northeast orientation as it leaves New Mexico traversing Raton Pass (7,798 feet (2,377 m)) and enters Colorado. The speed limit through Raton Pass is 65 mph (105 km/h). From Santa Fe to Raton Pass, I-25 approximates part of the route of the Santa Fe Trail. I-25 is 462.124 miles (743.716 km) long in New Mexico.

== Exit list ==
County	Location	mi	km	Exit	Destinations	Notes
Doña Ana	Las Cruces	0.00	0.00		I-10 east (US 85 south / US 180 east) – El Paso	Southern end of US 85 concurrency; national southern terminus; I-10 exit 144; tri-stack interchange; US 85 continues south on I-10/US 180 east to Texas state line
Doña Ana	Las Cruces	0.00	0.00	—	I-10 west (US 180 west) – Deming	Southbound exit and northbound entrance; I-10 exit 144; tri-stack interchange
Doña Ana	Las Cruces	2.27	3.65	1	University Avenue	Access to New Mexico State University
Doña Ana	Las Cruces	4.20	6.76	3	Lohman Avenue	
Doña Ana	Las Cruces	6.91	11.12	6	US 70 / Del Rey Boulevard – Las Cruces, Alamogordo, White Sands National Park, White Sands Missile Range	
Doña Ana	Las Cruces	10.59	17.04	9	NM 320 – Doña Ana	
Doña Ana	Radium Springs	19.82	31.90	19	NM 157 – Radium Springs	Leasburg Dam State Park, Fort Selden State Monument
Doña Ana		33.74	54.30	32	Upham	
Doña Ana	Rincon	36.48	58.71	35	NM 140 west – Rincon	
Doña Ana	Hatch	42.22	67.95	41	NM 26 west to I-10 – Hatch, Deming, Lordsburg	
Sierra	Garfield	52.02	83.72	51	NM 546 – Garfield, Salem	
Sierra	Caballo Lake	60.48	97.33	59	NM 187 – Caballo, Percha State Parks	
Sierra	Caballo	64.75	104.21	63	NM 152 – Hillsboro, Silver City	
Sierra		72.51	116.69	71	Las Palomas	
Sierra	Williamsburg	75.99	122.29	75	I-25 BL north – Truth or Consequences, Williamsburg	
Sierra	Truth or Consequences	80.13	128.96	79	I-25 BL south – Truth or Consequences	
Sierra	Truth or Consequences	84.74	136.38	83	NM 195 (NM 181) – Elephant Butte, Elephant Butte Lake State Park	
Sierra		89.99	144.82	89	NM 181 to NM 52 – Cuchillo, Monticello	Not signed northbound
Sierra		92.66	149.12	92	NM 1 – Mitchell Point	Elephant Butte Lake State Park
Sierra		101.41	163.20	100	NM 1 – Red Rock	
Socorro		116.23	187.05	115	NM 107 – Magdalena, Camino Real International Heritage Center	
Socorro		125.55	202.05	124	San Marcial, Bosque del Apache National Wildlife Refuge	
Socorro	San Antonio	140.33	225.84	139	US 380 east – San Antonio, Carrizozo, Bosque del Apache National Wildlife Refuge	
Socorro	Socorro	148.95	239.71	147	I-25 BL north to US 60 west – Socorro, Magdalena	
Socorro	Socorro	151.47	243.77	150	I-25 BL south / US 60 west – Socorro, Magdalena	Southern end of US 60 concurrency
Socorro	Escondida	153.30	246.71	152	Escondida	
Socorro	Lemitar	157.25	253.07	156	NM 408 – Lemitar	
Socorro		164.08	264.06	163	San Acacia	
Socorro	La Joya	170.97	275.15	169	Sevilleta National Wildlife Refuge	
Socorro		176.34	283.79	175	US 60 east (NM 116) – Bernardo, Mountainair	Northern end of US 60 concurrency
Valencia	Belen	191.37	307.98	190	I-25 BL north – Belen, South Belen	
Valencia	Belen	193.01	310.62	191	Camino del Llano	
Valencia	Belen	197.09	317.19	195	I-25 BL south – Belen	
Valencia	Los Lunas	201.75	324.69	201	Los Lunas Boulevard	Under construction; expected opening in 2029. Currently named Morris Road.
Valencia	Los Lunas	204.42	328.98	203	NM 6 – Los Lunas	
Bernalillo		211.04	339.64	209	NM 317 to NM 45 (Coors Blvd) – Isleta Pueblo	To NM 314 (Isleta Boulevard)
Bernalillo		214.71	345.54	213	NM 314 (Isleta Boulevard)	
Bernalillo	Albuquerque	216.56	348.52	215	NM 47 (Broadway) – Bosque Farms, Peralta	
Bernalillo	Albuquerque	217.10	349.39	217	Mesa Del Sol Boulevard	Proposed interchange for Mesa del Sol
Bernalillo	Albuquerque	218.70	351.96	218	Bobby Foster Road	Proposed interchange for Mesa del Sol
Bernalillo	Albuquerque	221.61	356.65	220	NM 500 (Rio Bravo Boulevard)	
Bernalillo	Albuquerque	223.24	359.27	221	Sunport Boulevard – Albuquerque International Sunport	
Bernalillo	Albuquerque	224.09	360.64	222	Gibson Boulevard – Kirtland Air Force Base	Signed as exits 222A (east) and 222B (west) southbound
Bernalillo	Albuquerque	224.80	361.78	223	Avenida Cesar Chavez	
Bernalillo	Albuquerque	225.45– 225.52	362.83– 362.94	224	Coal Avenue, Lead Avenue, Central Avenue	Northbound access via Oak Street, southbound via Locust Street; northbound exit serves Presbyterian Hospital; Central Avenue not signed southbound; formerly exit 224A (northbound)
Bernalillo	Albuquerque	225.73	363.28	224B	Central Avenue / Dr. Martin Luther King, Jr. Avenue	Permanently closed and removed in September 2022; northbound access was via Oak Street, southbound was via Locust Street; served Lovelace Medical Center - Downtown; Hist. US 66 (Central Avenue) was not signed northbound
Bernalillo	Albuquerque	226.34	364.26	225	Lomas Boulevard, Menaul Boulevard, Candelaria Road – Local traffic	Southbound signed as "Lomas Boulevard" only; serves Heart Hospital of New Mexico and Kindred Hospital Albuquerque
Bernalillo	Albuquerque	227.36	365.90	226A-B	I-40 – Gallup, Santa Rosa	Signed as exits 226A (east) and 226B (west); I-40 exits 159B-C; Big I interchange
Bernalillo	Albuquerque	228.69	368.04	227	Comanche Road, Griegos Road, Candelaria Road, Menaul Boulevard	Griegos Road not signed southbound, Candelaria Road and Menaul Boulevard not signed northbound
Bernalillo	Albuquerque	229.62	369.54	228	Montgomery Boulevard, Montaño Road	Montaño Road is west of I-25, Montgomery Boulevard is east of I-25
Bernalillo	Albuquerque	230.67	371.23	229	Jefferson Street	
Bernalillo	Albuquerque	231.57	372.68	230	San Mateo Boulevard, Osuna Road	Osuna signed northbound only
Bernalillo	Albuquerque	232.09	373.51	231	San Antonio Avenue, Ellison Road, Osuna Road	Osuna signed southbound only
Bernalillo	Albuquerque	233.06	375.07	232	NM 423 (Paseo del Norte)	
Bernalillo	Albuquerque	233.79	376.25	233	NM 528 (Alameda Boulevard)	
Bernalillo	Sandia Pueblo	235.15	378.44	234	NM 556 (Tramway Road, Roy Avenue)	
Sandoval	Bernalillo	241.86	389.24	240	NM 473 (Avenida Bernalillo)	
Sandoval	Bernalillo	243.38	391.68	242	US 550 north / NM 165 east – Placitas, Bernalillo, Rio Rancho	Former NM 44
Sandoval		249.10	400.89	248	NM 315 – Algodones	
Sandoval		253.60	408.13	252	San Felipe Pueblo	
Sandoval		258.73	416.39	257	Budaghers	Mormon Battalion Memorial on west side about a mile south of the exit
Sandoval		260.43	419.12	259	NM 22 – Santo Domingo Pueblo	
Santa Fe		265.96	428.02	264	NM 16 – Cochiti Pueblo	
Santa Fe		268.55	432.19	267	Waldo Canyon Road	
Santa Fe	La Cienega	272.77	438.98	271	CR 50F – La Cienega	
Santa Fe		276.89	445.61	276	NM 599 north (Santa Fe Relief Route) to NM 14 – Madrid, Los Alamos, Española, Taos	Madrid signed northbound only, Española signed southbound only
Santa Fe	Santa Fe	278.75	448.60	278	NM 14 (Cerrillos Road)	
Santa Fe	Santa Fe	283.63	456.46	282	US 84 / US 285 north (St. Francis Drive) / Frontage Road – Santa Fe Plaza, Española, Los Alamos, Taos	Western end of US 84/US 285 concurrency; signed as exits 282A (Frontage Road) and 282B (US 84/US 285) southbound
Santa Fe	Santa Fe	285.14	458.89	284	NM 466 (Old Pecos Trail)	
Santa Fe		291.56	469.22	290	US 285 south (NM 300) – Clines Corners	Eastern end of US 285 concurrency
Santa Fe		295.14	474.98	294	Cañoncito at Apache Canyon	
Santa Fe		298.16	479.84	297	Valencia	
Santa Fe		300.28	483.25	299	NM 50 – Glorieta, Pecos	
San Miguel		308.87	497.08	307	NM 63 – Pecos, Rowe, Pecos National Historic Park	
San Miguel	Sands	321.48	517.37	319	San Jose, San Juan	
San Miguel		324.25	521.83	323	NM 3 south – Villanueva	
San Miguel		331.19	533.00	330	Bernal	
San Miguel		336.50	541.54	335	Tecolote	
San Miguel		340.97	548.74	339	US 84 south – Romeroville, Santa Rosa	Eastern end of US 84 concurrency
San Miguel	Las Vegas	345.00	555.22	343	I-25 BL south / US 85 / NM 329 / NM 283 – Las Vegas	Northern end of unsigned US 85 concurrency; access to NM 283 via frontage road
San Miguel	Las Vegas	347.05	558.52	345	NM 104 (University Avenue) / I-25 BL / NM 65	
San Miguel	Las Vegas	349.09	561.81	347	I-25 BL south to NM 65 / NM 518 / US 85 – Las Vegas, Taos	Sorthern end of unsigned US 85 concurrency
San Miguel		353.29	568.57	352	Airport	Access via NM 250
San Miguel		357.53	575.39	356	Onava	
San Miguel		362.65	583.63	361	No name exit	
Mora	Watrous	365.82	588.73	364	NM 161 to NM 97 – Watrous, Valmora	
Mora	Watrous	367.87	592.03	366	NM 161 to NM 97 – Watrous, Valmora	
Mora	Wagon Mound	389.01	626.05	387	NM 120 – Wagon Mound	
Mora		394.48	634.85	393	Levy	
Colfax		405.82	653.10	404	NM 569 – Colmor	
Colfax	Springer	413.39	665.29	412	To US 56 (US 412) / NM 21 / NM 468 – Springer, Museum	Access via unsigned I-25 BL; serves Santa Fe Trail Museum
Colfax	Springer	415.93	669.37	414	To US 56 (US 412) / NM 21 / NM 468 – Springer, Museum	Access via unsigned I-25 BL; serves Santa Fe Trail Museum
Colfax		420.20	676.25	419	NM 58 west – Cimarron	
Colfax	Maxwell	427.36	687.77	426	NM 505 to NM 445 – Maxwell, Maxwell National Wildlife Refuge	
Colfax		436.50	702.48	435	Tinaja	
Colfax		448.01	721.00	446	US 64 west / Santa Fe Trail Scenic Byway – Taos	Southern end of US 64 concurrency
Colfax	Raton	451.25	726.22	450	I-25 BL north (US 64 east) – Raton	Northern end of US 64 concurrency
Colfax	Raton	452.72	728.58	451	US 87 east / US 64 – Raton, Clayton	Southern end of US 87 concurrency; future northern terminus of I-27
Colfax	Raton	453.84	730.38	452	NM 72 east – Folsom	
Colfax	Raton	455.80	733.54	454	I-25 BL south – Raton	
New Mexico–Colorado line		461.72	743.07	460	Truck weigh station	First southbound exit in New Mexico; exit not signed northbound
New Mexico–Colorado line		461.72	743.07		I-25 north (US 85 / US 87 north) / Santa Fe Trail Scenic Byway – Trinidad, Denver	Continuation into Colorado
1.000 mi = 1.609 km; 1.000 km = 0.621 mi: Concurrency terminus; Incomplete access

== Related routes ==
Interstate 25 Business
- Location: New Mexico

I-25 in New Mexico currently has no auxiliary Interstates but it has six active business routes. The active business routes are located in Williamsburg–Truth or Consequences, Socorro, Belen, Las Vegas, Springer, and Raton. There was one other business route that was located in Santa Fe but was decommissioned.

Interstate 25
Previous state: Terminus	New Mexico	Next state: Colorado

U.S. Route 85
Previous state: Texas	New Mexico	Next state: Colorado
