= North Valley, New Mexico =

- Census-designated place
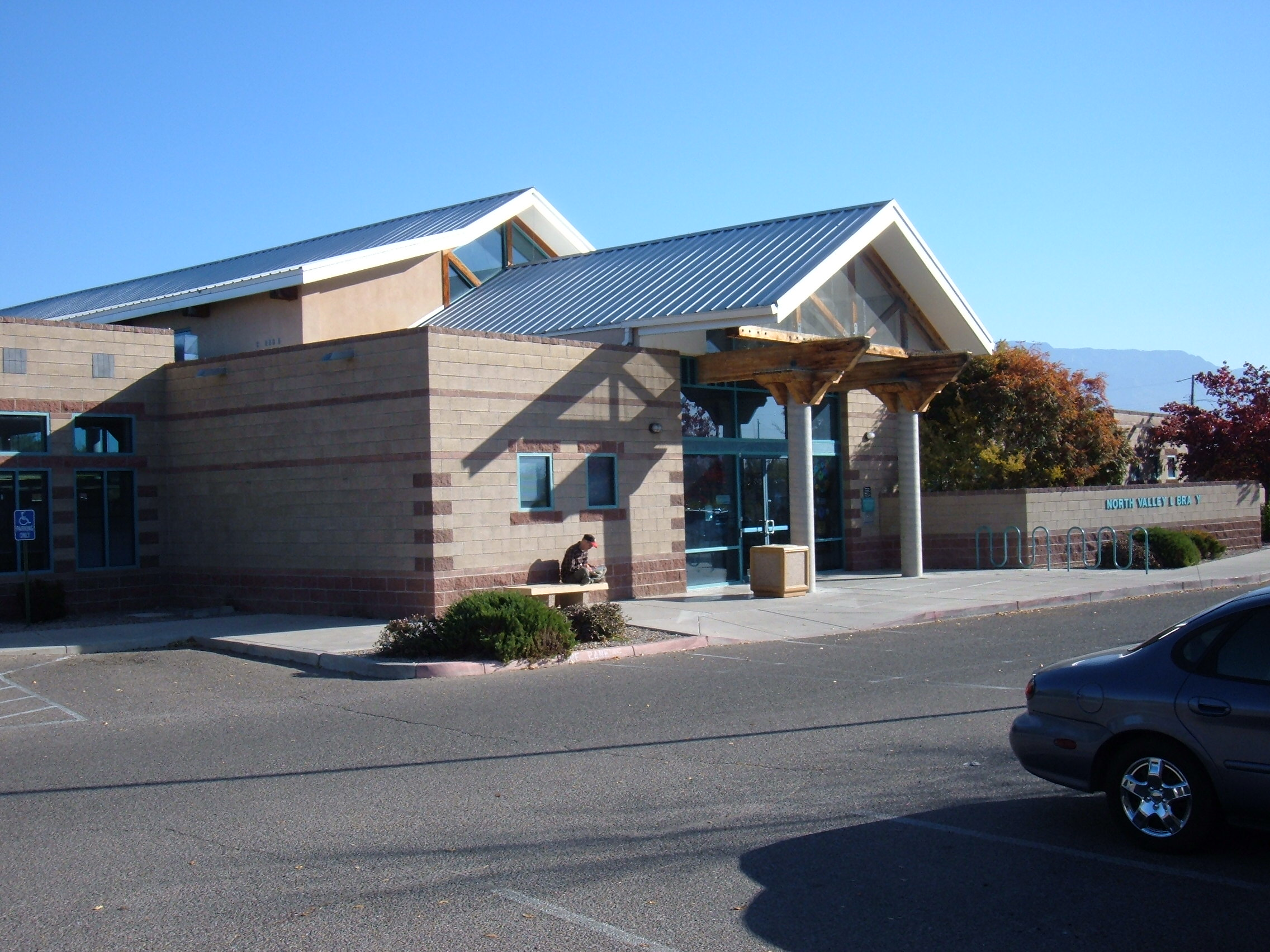
- North Valley Library

- Location of North Valley, New Mexico

- Location in the United States
- Coordinates: 35°10′17″N 106°37′34″W
- Country: United States
- State: New Mexico
- County: Bernalillo

Area
  - Total: 6.97 sq mi (18.06 km^{2})
  - Land: 6.95 sq mi (17.99 km^{2})
  - Water: 0.027 sq mi (0.07 km^{2})
- Elevation: 4,994 ft (1,522 m)

Population (2020)
  - Total: 11,149
  - Density: 1,605.0/sq mi (619.69/km^{2})
- Time zone: UTC−7 (Mountain (MST))
  - Summer (DST): UTC−6 (MDT)
- Area code: 505
- FIPS code: 35-52750
- GNIS feature ID: 2408952

North Valley is a census-designated place (CDP) in Bernalillo County, New Mexico, United States. As of the 2020 census, North Valley had a population of 11,149. It is part of the Albuquerque Metropolitan Statistical Area.

== Geography ==
According to the United States Census Bureau, the CDP has a total area of 7.0 square miles (18.2 km^{2}), of which 0.03 square miles (0.08 km^{2}), or 0.44%, is water.

== Climate ==
North Valley has an arid climate (BSk, depending on the particular scheme of the Köppen climate classification system one uses), With daytime temperature averaging about five degrees warmer than the Albuquerque International Sunport and overnight lows averaging slightly cooler. North Valley has a more of a desert feel especially in the summer months when temperatures often reach 100 °F (38 °C)+. Average annual precipitation is 6.75 inches (171 mm).

Winters are mild with cold nights and warm days. Snowfall is rare, with an average of 3.7 inches (94 mm), and when it does occur it usually melts by the afternoon. Highs are usually in the 40 °F (4 °C) to 60 °F (16 °C) with lows in the 20 °F (−7 °C) and 30 °F (−1 °C).

Spring can be windy at times with blowing dust but pleasant for the most part. Highs are usually in the 60 °F (16 °C) to the 80 °F (27 °C) with lows in 30 °F (−1 °C) to the 50 °F (10 °C).

Summer brings hot conditions with low humidity typical of the desert southwest. Monsoon season usually start in late June to early July and may last until mid to late September, depending on the annual intensity of the moist air from the Gulf of California. Highs are usually in the 90 °F (32 °C) and 100 °F (38 °C) with lows in the 60 °F (16 °C) and 70 °F (21 °C).

Fall brings cooler temperatures and drier conditions. Nights can get chilly at times but are pleasant at others. One can watch the Albuquerque International Balloon Fiesta from their yards from anywhere in the North Valley. Highs are in the 60 °F (16 °C) to the 80 °F (27 °C) with lows in the 30 °F (−1 °C) to 60 °F (16 °C).

Climate data for North Valley, 1958–2010 normals
Month	Jan	Feb	Mar	Apr	May	Jun	Jul	Aug	Sep	Oct	Nov	Dec	Year
Record high °F (°C)	76 (24)	80 (27)	89 (32)	97 (36)	104 (40)	113 (45)	110 (43)	104 (40)	105 (41)	92 (33)	81 (27)	75 (24)	113 (45)
Mean daily maximum °F (°C)	52.3 (11.3)	59.1 (15.1)	66.8 (19.3)	75.6 (24.2)	85.7 (29.8)	96.7 (35.9)	97.3 (36.3)	94.9 (34.9)	89.2 (31.8)	77.2 (25.1)	63.8 (17.7)	52.0 (11.1)	75.9 (24.4)
Mean daily minimum °F (°C)	27.3 (−2.6)	32.4 (0.2)	36.0 (2.2)	44.6 (7.0)	56.8 (13.8)	68.6 (20.3)	72.4 (22.4)	66.3 (19.1)	58.4 (14.7)	45.5 (7.5)	32.8 (0.4)	27.4 (−2.6)	47.4 (8.6)
Record low °F (°C)	−7 (−22)	1 (−17)	9 (−13)	21 (−6)	29 (−2)	42 (6)	42 (6)	48 (9)	28 (−2)	17 (−8)	6 (−14)	−19 (−28)	−19 (−28)
Average precipitation inches (mm)	0.30 (7.6)	0.28 (7.1)	0.33 (8.4)	0.48 (12)	0.55 (14)	0.49 (12)	1.10 (28)	1.33 (34)	0.81 (21)	0.51 (13)	0.27 (6.9)	0.32 (8.1)	6.75 (171)
Average snowfall inches (cm)	0.80 (2.0)	1.70 (4.3)	0.20 (0.51)	0 (0)	0 (0)	0 (0)	0 (0)	0 (0)	0 (0)	0.20 (0.51)	0.20 (0.51)	0.6 (1.5)	3.7 (9.4)
Average precipitation days (≥ 0.01 in)	3.1	2.1	3.2	3.0	4.2	1.4	6.4	7.5	4.2	3.3	2.1	6.6	47.1
Average snowy days (≥ 0.1 in)	0.7	2.0	0.9	0	0	0	0	0	0	0.2	0.7	1.0	5.5
Mean monthly sunshine hours	235.6	226.0	269.7	306.0	347.2	360.0	334.8	313.1	288.0	282.1	234.0	223.2	3,419.7
Source: NOAA (extremes 1958–present), Hong Kong Observatory (sun only, 1961–1990)

== Demographics ==
Historical population
Census	Pop.	Note	%±
2020	11,149		—
U.S. Decennial Census

=== 2020 census ===
As of the 2020 census, North Valley had a population of 11,149. The median age was 48.5 years. 18.7% of residents were under the age of 18 and 24.2% of residents were 65 years of age or older. For every 100 females there were 99.0 males, and for every 100 females age 18 and over there were 97.4 males age 18 and over.

99.9% of residents lived in urban areas, while 0.1% lived in rural areas.

There were 4,549 households in North Valley, of which 24.6% had children under the age of 18 living in them. Of all households, 42.8% were married-couple households, 22.0% were households with a male householder and no spouse or partner present, and 27.4% were households with a female householder and no spouse or partner present. About 28.7% of all households were made up of individuals and 14.4% had someone living alone who was 65 years of age or older.

There were 4,850 housing units, of which 6.2% were vacant. The homeowner vacancy rate was 1.4% and the rental vacancy rate was 7.6%.

Racial composition as of the 2020 census
Race	Number	Percent
White	5,646	50.6%
Black or African American	101	0.9%
American Indian and Alaska Native	404	3.6%
Asian	89	0.8%
Native Hawaiian and Other Pacific Islander	11	0.1%
Some other race	2,240	20.1%
Two or more races	2,658	23.8%
Hispanic or Latino (of any race)	6,583	59.0%

=== 2000 census ===
As of the census of 2000, there were 11,923 people, 4,467 households, and 3,095 families residing in the CDP. The population density was 1,645.3 inhabitants per square mile (635.3/km^{2}). There were 4,772 housing units at an average density of 658.5 per square mile (254.2/km^{2}). The racial makeup of the CDP was 73.62% White, 1.04% African American, 2.91% Native American, 0.41% Asian, 0.06% Pacific Islander, 18.19% from other races, and 3.77% from two or more races. Hispanic or Latino of any race were 56.81% of the population.

There were 4,467 households, out of which 30.0% had children under the age of 18 living with them, 50.1% were married couples living together, 12.8% had a female householder with no husband present, and 30.7% were non-families. 24.7% of all households were made up of individuals, and 8.8% had someone living alone who was 65 years of age or older. The average household size was 2.59 and the average family size was 3.08.

In the CDP, the population was spread out, with 25.6% under the age of 18, 8.3% from 18 to 24, 26.2% from 25 to 44, 25.8% from 45 to 64, and 14.1% who were 65 years of age or older. The median age was 39 years. For every 100 females, there were 99.4 males. For every 100 females age 18 and over, there were 96.7 males.

The median income for a household in the CDP was $39,888, and the median income for a family was $45,129. Males had a median income of $31,948 versus $26,433 for females. The per capita income for the CDP was $19,398. About 8.5% of families and 10.7% of the population were below the poverty line, including 13.5% of those under age 18 and 10.1% of those age 65 or over.

== Education ==
It is zoned to Albuquerque Public Schools.
