= New Mexico State Road 314 =

State highway in New Mexico, United States

State Road 314

Route information
- Maintained by NMDOT
- Length: 18.523 mi (29.810 km)

Major junctions
- South end: I-25 BL in Belen
- NM 6 in Los Lunas; NM 45 in Isleta Village Proper; I-25 / US 85 in Albuquerque
- North end: Isleta Boulevard in Albuquerque

Location
- Country: United States
- State: New Mexico
- Counties: Bernalillo, Valencia

Highway system
- New Mexico State Highway System; Interstate; US; State; Scenic
← NM 313	→ NM 315

State Road 314 (NM 314) is a 18.523-mile-long (29.810 km) state highway in the US state of New Mexico, connecting Belen to I-25 by way of the Isleta Pueblo. The entire route is an old alignment of US 85, and the portion north of Los Lunas is also a historic routing of US 66.

== Route description ==
NM 314 begins at an intersection with Interstate 25 Business just north of Belen. From here it proceeds slightly east of north, generally paralleling the route of the BNSF Railway and the Rio Grande. At Los Lunas, it intersects NM 6, where the original alignment of US 66 turns north. NM 314 continues to the Pueblo of Isleta, where it intersects NM 45 and turns to the northeast. After passing the settlement of Isleta and intersecting NM 147, it turns to the north again before coming to its northern terminus at Interstate 25. The roadway continues towards Albuquerque as Isleta Boulevard, though this is no longer state-maintained.

== Major intersections ==
County	Location	mi	km	Destinations	Notes
Valencia	Belen	0.000	0.000	I-25 BL	Southern terminus; interchange
Valencia	Los Lunas	8.135	13.092	NM 6	
Bernalillo	Isleta Village Proper	14.950	24.060	NM 45 north	Southern terminus of NM 45
Bernalillo	Isleta Village Proper	16.073	25.867	NM 147 east	Western terminus of NM 147
Bernalillo	Albuquerque	18.415– 18.495	29.636– 29.765	I-25 / US 85	I-25 exit 213; interchange
Bernalillo	Albuquerque	18.523	29.810	Isleta Boulevard; To NM 500	Northern terminus; continues north as Isleta Boulevard to NM 500
1.000 mi = 1.609 km; 1.000 km = 0.621 mi
