= National Register of Historic Places listings in Valencia County, New Mexico =

Location of Valencia County in New Mexico

This is a list of the National Register of Historic Places listings in Valencia County, New Mexico.

This is intended to be a complete list of the properties and districts on the National Register of Historic Places in Valencia County, New Mexico, United States. Latitude and longitude coordinates are provided for many National Register properties and districts; these locations may be seen together in a map.

There are 12 properties and districts listed on the National Register in the county. All of the places within the county listed on the National Register are also recorded on the State Register of Cultural Properties.

This National Park Service list is complete through NPS recent listings posted May 1, 2026.

Contents: NRHP in New Mexico by county
Bernalillo – Catron – Chaves – Cibola – Colfax – Curry – De Baca – Doña Ana – Eddy – Grant – Guadalupe – Harding – Hidalgo – Lea – Lincoln – Los Alamos – Luna – McKinley – Mora – Otero – Quay – Rio Arriba – Roosevelt – San Juan – San Miguel – Sandoval – Santa Fe – Sierra – Socorro – Taos – Torrance – Union – Valencia

== Current listings ==
	Name on the Register	Image	Date listed	Location	City or town	Description
1	Atchison, Topeka, and Santa Fe Railroad Depot	Atchison, Topeka, and Santa Fe Railroad Depot	August 1, 1979 (#79001562)	New Mexico State Road 314; 34°47′42″N 106°44′20″W	Los Lunas	Atchison, Topeka & Santa Fe Railroad depot built in 1879, the oldest of its standard design in New Mexico
2	Miguel E. Baca House	Miguel E. Baca House	December 11, 1978 (#78001835)	State Road 47; 34°42′42″N 106°43′49″W	Adelino	
3	Belen City Hall	Belen City Hall	April 29, 2019 (#100003676)	503 Becker Ave. 34°39′37″N 106°46′24″W	Belen	
4	Belen Hotel	Belen Hotel	November 12, 1980 (#80002574)	200 Becker Ave. 34°39′36″N 106°46′08″W	Belen	
5	Felipe Chaves House	Felipe Chaves House	July 4, 1980 (#80002575)	325 Lala St. 34°39′44″N 106°46′38″W	Belen	
6	El Cerro Tome Site	El Cerro Tome Site	July 9, 1996 (#96000739)	0.5 miles east of the junction of State Road 47 and Tome Hill Rd. 34°45′20″N 106°42′19″W	Tome	
7	Belen Harvey House	Belen Harvey House	October 28, 1983 (#83004180)	104 N. 1st St. 34°39′36″N 106°46′02″W	Belen	
8	Los Ojuelos (The Springs)		December 10, 1987 (#87002080)	Address Restricted	Tome	
9	Tranquilino Luna House		April 16, 1975 (#75001175)	Southwest of Los Lunas at the junction of U.S. Route 85 and State Road 6; 34°48′26″N 106°44′08″W	Los Lunas	
10	Otero's 66 Service	Otero's 66 Service	February 13, 2003 (#03000051)	100 W. Main St. 34°48′26″N 106°44′03″W	Los Lunas	
11	Tome Jail	Tome Jail	October 5, 1977 (#77000932)	Tome Plaza; 34°44′26″N 106°43′49″W	Tome	
12	Dr. William Frederick Wittwer House		February 27, 1987 (#87000131)	State Road 6, west of U.S. Route 85; 34°48′29″N 106°44′09″W	Los Lunas	

== See also ==
- List of National Historic Landmarks in New Mexico
- National Register of Historic Places listings in New Mexico
