= List of county courthouses in New Mexico =

This is a list of current and former county courthouses in the U.S. state of New Mexico. Many of the buildings are listed on the National Register of Historic Places or other listings of historic places, as noted.

New Mexico's original nine counties were established in 1852, shortly after the organization of New Mexico Territory. The earliest county courthouses were generally small one- or two-story adobe buildings, often re-purposed homes or commercial buildings. Some counties did not even have a formal courthouse, with the district court (which was only in session a few days a year) renting rooms when necessary to conduct its business. A handful of early courthouses are still standing, including notable examples in Cimarron, Lincoln, and Mesilla.

New Mexico's public buildings began to grow in scale and ambition in the 1880s, spurred by the arrival of the railroad. With skilled workers, modern building materials, and more advanced construction techniques now available, larger and grander county courthouses emulating those in the eastern states were seen as points of civic pride. During the 1880s and 1890s, large brick or stone courthouses, many with elaborate Victorian architecture, were built in 13 counties. The only one of these still standing in its original form is the Old Colfax County Courthouse in Springer, though a few others exist in ruins.

The next wave of courthouse construction occurred between 1934 and 1942, when President Franklin D. Roosevelt's New Deal programs made large amounts of federal funding available for public works projects. Thirteen counties took advantage of New Deal programs to replace their aging railroad-era courthouses, and the Eddy County Courthouse was remodeled. Courthouses from this period often featured Art Deco or Pueblo style architecture, and the majority of them remain in use.

Historically, the county courthouse housed all the administrative and judicial functions of the county government. As county governments have expanded with growing populations, many counties now have much more decentralized facilities. This list includes only buildings currently or formerly used by the New Mexico District Court.

KEY

Courthouses with multiple historic designations are colored according to their highest designation within the following hierarchy.

# Listed on the National Register of Historic Places (NRHP) as a contributing property of a National Historic Landmark District
† Listed individually on the NRHP
‡ Listed as a contributing property of an NRHP Historic District
⁕ Listed individually on the State Register of Cultural Properties (SRCP)
⁑ Listed as a contributing property of an SRCP Historic District

== Current ==
Courthouse	Image	Location	Built	Notes
Bernalillo		Albuquerque; 35°05′27″N 106°39′04″W	2001	
Catron		Reserve; 33°42′45″N 108°45′28″W	1969	
Chaves†⁕		Roswell; 33°23′49″N 104°31′17″W	1911	NRHP-listed (refnum 87000892)
Cibola		Grants; 35°09′46″N 107°49′53″W	2016	
Colfax†⁕		Raton; 36°54′15″N 104°26′26″W	1936	NRHP-listed (refnum 87000882)
Curry†⁕		Clovis; 34°24′19″N 103°12′20″W	1936	NRHP-listed (refnum 87000881)
De Baca†⁕		Fort Sumner; 34°28′20″N 104°14′36″W	1930	NRHP-listed (refnum 87000896)
Doña Ana		Las Cruces; 32°18′57″N 106°46′58″W	2006	Incorporates the 1927 Las Cruces Union High School building
Eddy⁕		Carlsbad; 32°25′15″N 104°13′42″W	1891	Remodeled 1937
Grant‡⁕		Silver City; 32°46′13″N 108°16′51″W	1930	Contributing property in Silver City Historic District
Guadalupe		Santa Rosa; 34°56′31″N 104°41′12″W	1948	
Harding†⁕		Mosquero; 35°46′31″N 103°57′26″W	1922	NRHP-listed (refnum 87000895)
Hidalgo†⁕		Lordsburg; 32°20′53″N 108°42′29″W	1926	NRHP-listed (refnum 87000897)
Lea†⁕		Lovington; 32°56′55″N 103°20′52″W	1936	NRHP-listed (refnum 87000880)
Lincoln		Carrizozo; 33°38′39″N 105°52′30″W	1965	
Los Alamos		Los Alamos; 35°52′52″N 106°18′16″W	2010	
Luna		Deming; 32°15′38″N 107°45′16″W	2008	
McKinley†⁕		Gallup; 35°31′30″N 108°44′32″W	1939	NRHP-listed (refnum 87000879)
Mora		Mora; 35°58′25″N 105°19′58″W	2019	
Otero		Alamogordo; 32°54′01″N 105°57′31″W	1956	
Quay⁕		Tucumcari; 35°10′36″N 103°43′40″W	1939	
Rio Arriba⁕		Tierra Amarilla; 36°41′54″N 106°33′07″W	1918	
Roosevelt†⁕		Portales; 34°11′20″N 103°20′14″W	1938	NRHP-listed (refnum 8001136)
San Juan		Aztec; 36°49′33″N 108°01′19″W	1980	
San Miguel		Las Vegas; 35°35′31″N 105°13′48″W	2006	
Sandoval		Bernalillo; 35°18′29″N 106°35′05″W	2005	
Santa Fe		Santa Fe; 35°41′06″N 105°56′37″W	2013	
Sierra		Truth or Consequences; 33°08′01″N 107°15′00″W	1936	Expanded in 1939
Socorro⁕		Socorro; 34°03′20″N 106°53′36″W	1940	
Taos		Taos; 36°23′49″N 105°34′33″W	2011	
Torrance		Estancia; 34°45′35″N 106°03′45″W	1967	
Union†⁕		Clayton; 36°26′58″N 103°11′16″W	1909	NRHP-listed (refnum 87000891)
Valencia		Los Lunas; 34°47′11″N 106°44′31″W	2008	

== Former ==
Courthouse	Image	Location	Built	Notes
Bernalillo (1886–1926)		Albuquerque; 35°05′39″N 106°40′08″W	1886	Later used by San Felipe School; demolished in 1959.
Bernalillo (1926–2001)		Albuquerque; 35°05′14″N 106°39′06″W	1926	Remodeled in modernist style in 1964. Still houses county offices.
Catron (1921–1969)		Reserve; 33°42′44″N 108°45′28″W	1916	Converted hotel; no longer standing
Chaves (1890–1910)		Roswell; 33°23′49″N 104°31′17″W	1890	Demolished in 1910
Cibola (1987–2016)		Grants; 35°09′15″N 107°51′15″W		School building converted to courthouse in 1987
Colfax (1872–1882)‡⁕		Cimarron; 36°30′17″N 104°55′18″W	1870	Contributing property in Cimarron Historic District
Colfax (1882–1897)†⁕		Springer; 36°21′50″N 104°35′43″W	1882	NRHP-listed (refnum 87000883)
Colfax (1898–1937)		Raton; 36°54′13″N 104°26′33″W	1898	No longer standing
Curry 1910–1936		Clovis; 34°24′19″N 103°12′22″W	1910	Demolished in 1954
Doña Ana (1852–1855)‡		Doña Ana; 32°23′10″N 106°48′57″W	c. 1840	One-story adobe building; contributing property in the Doña Ana Village Historic District.
Doña Ana (1855–1882)#†⁕		Mesilla; 32°16′27″N 106°47′42″W	c. 1850	Contributing property in Mesilla Plaza Historic District
Doña Ana (1882–1883)⁕		Las Cruces; 32°18′26″N 106°46′43″W	1866	Later used as the Amador Hotel
Doña Ana (1883–1938)		Las Cruces; 32°18′42″N 106°47′02″W	1883	Demolished c. 1940
Doña Ana (1938–2006)⁕		Las Cruces; 32°18′23″N 106°46′46″W	1938	PWA project; three-story Pueblo-style building designed by Percy McGee. Currently vacant.
Grant (1883–1930)		Silver City; 32°46′13″N 108°16′50″W	1883	No longer standing
Guadalupe (1893–1903)⁕		Puerto de Luna; 34°49′51″N 104°37′16″W	1893	In ruins
Guadalupe (1909–1948)†⁕		Santa Rosa; 34°56′30″N 104°41′11″W	1909	NRHP-listed (refnum 87000890)
Lea (1917–1936)		Lovington	1917	No longer standing
Lincoln (1869–1880)#‡		Lincoln; 33°29′31″N 105°23′09″W	c. 1869	Contributing property in the Lincoln Historic District
Lincoln (1880–1913)#‡⁕		Lincoln; 33°29′37″N 105°23′27″W	1874	Converted store. Contributing property in the Lincoln Historic District
Lincoln (1913–1965)		Carrizozo	1913	No longer standing
Los Alamos (1956–1967)		Los Alamos	c. 1943	Converted government building
Los Alamos (1967–2008)		Los Alamos; 35°52′53″N 106°18′14″W	1967	Demolished in 2008
Luna (1910–2008)†⁕		Deming; 32°15′44″N 107°45′23″W	1910	NRHP-listed (refnum 77000925). Still houses county administrative offices and probate court.
McKinley (1907–1939)		Gallup	1907	No longer standing
Mora (1861–1889)		Mora	1861	
Mora (1889–1939)		Mora; 35°58′28″N 105°19′54″W	1889	Burned in the 1950s
Mora (1939)		Mora; 35°58′26″N 105°19′55″W	1939	Demolished
Otero (1901–1956)		Alamogordo; 32°54′01″N 105°57′30″W	1901	No longer standing
Quay (1908–1939)		Tucumcari; 35°10′36″N 103°43′41″W	1908	No longer standing
Rio Arriba (1855–1860)†⁕		Los Luceros; 39°07′05″N 106°02′27″W	1712	NRHP-listed (refnum 83004157)
Rio Arriba (1880–1918)		Tierra Amarilla	c. 1880	Converted one-story adobe house; remodeled and expanded to two stories in 1885.
Roosevelt (1904–1937)		Portales	1904	Two-story concrete block building; no longer standing
San Juan (1902–1951)		Aztec; 36°49′16″N 107°59′33″W	1902	No longer standing
San Juan (1951–1980)		Aztec; 36°49′16″N 107°59′32″W	1951	Demolished
San Miguel (1852–1864)		San Miguel del Vado; 35°21′52″N 105°27′06″W	c. 1852	Some foundations still present
San Miguel (1864–1881)		Las Vegas; 35°35′38″N 105°13′38″W	1864	One-story adobe building; no longer standing
San Miguel (1881–1885)‡		Las Vegas; 35°35′33″N 105°13′35″W	1881	Contributing property in the Las Vegas Plaza Historic District
San Miguel (1885–1942)		Las Vegas	1885	Two-story sandstone building designed by E. J. Jenison; demolished.
San Miguel (1942–2006)		Las Vegas; 35°35′30″N 105°13′49″W	1942	Still houses county administrative offices and probate court.
Sandoval (1903–1905)⁕		Corrales; 35°13′48″N 106°36′50″W	c. 1850	Converted house
Sandoval (1905–1926)		Bernalillo		Converted two-story adobe house. Burned in 1926.
Sandoval (1928–2005)		Bernalillo; 35°18′23″N 106°32′55″W	1928	Frontal addition built in 1975. Still houses county offices.
Santa Fe (1886–1909)		Santa Fe; 35°41′15″N 105°56′09″W	1886	Burned in 1909. Parts of the walls and foundation were incorporated into the 1910 courthouse.
Santa Fe (1910–1939)		Santa Fe; 35°41′15″N 105°56′09″W	1910	Two-story building designed by Isaac Hamilton Rapp. Remodeled in the Territorial style and converted to office use; now known as the Coronado Building.
Santa Fe (1939–1975)⁕		Santa Fe; 35°41′19″N 105°56′27″W	1939	Two-story building designed by John Gaw Meem. Still houses county administrative offices and probate court.
Santa Fe (1975–2013)		Santa Fe; 35°41′27″N 105°56′26″W	1937	Converted school building
Sierra (1892–1936)⁑		Hillsboro; 32°55′09″N 107°34′10″W	1892	In ruins
Socorro (1884–1939)		Socorro; 34°03′20″N 106°53′36″W	1884	Demolished in 1939
Taos (1852–1934)		Taos; 36°24′27″N 105°34′28″W	1839	Two-story adobe building; burned in 1934
Taos (1934–1970)‡⁕		Taos; 36°24′27″N 105°34′28″W	1934	Contributing property in Taos Downtown Historic District
Taos (1970–2011)		Taos; 36°23′49″N 105°34′33″W	1970	Demolished
Torrance (1910–1967)		Estancia; 34°45′34″N 106°03′42″W	1910	Demolished in 1967
Union (1895–1908)		Clayton; 36°26′58″N 103°11′16″W	1895	Destroyed by tornado in 1908
Valencia (1852–1872)		Tome	c. 1850	One-story adobe building on north side of Tome plaza; no longer standing
Valencia (1872–1874)		Belen	c. 1870	Converted church
Valencia (1875)		Tome; 34°44′25″N 106°43′51″W	1875	Two-story adobe building; no longer standing. Adjacent jail was built of stone and is still intact.
Valencia (1876–1912)		Los Lunas	1876	Two-story adobe building. Burned in 1912.
Valencia (1913–1960)		Los Lunas	1913	Two-story brick building with attached jail. Demolished in 1962.
Valencia (1960–2008)		Los Lunas; 34°48′08″N 106°44′02″W	1960	Two-story Modernist style building designed by Lawrence Garcia. Still houses county administrative offices and probate court.
