= Grandstand =

Structure for seating spectators

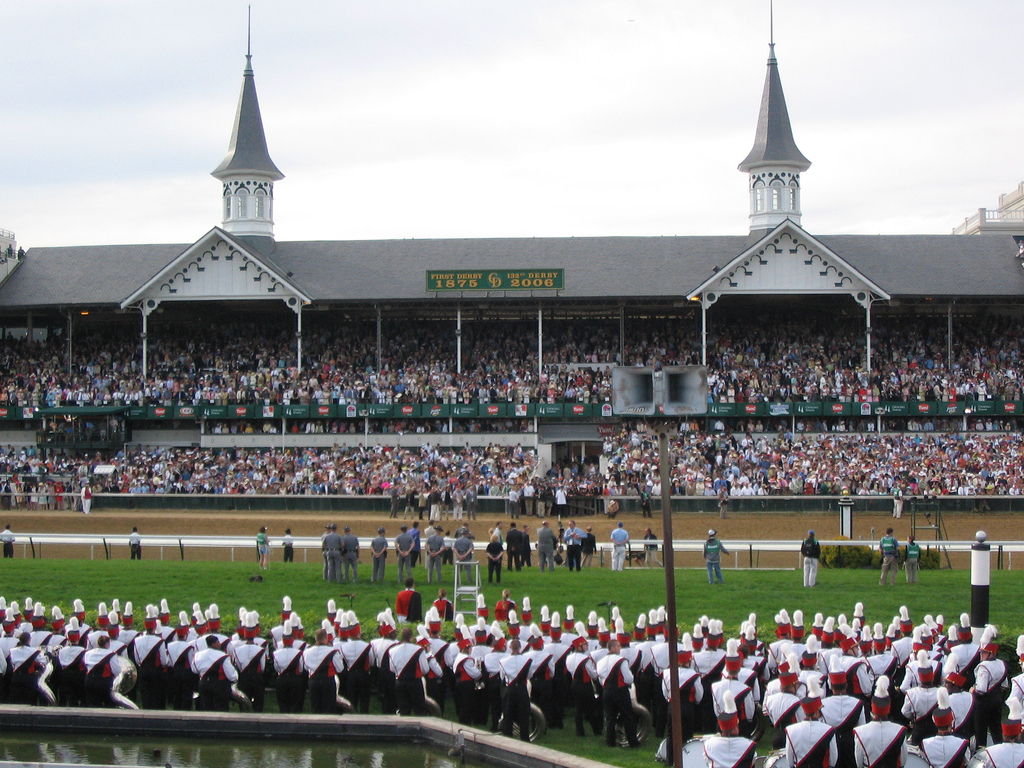
The grandstand at Churchill Downs

A grandstand is a normally permanent structure for seating spectators, typically at sports stadiums and including both auto racing and horse racing. The grandstand is in essence like a single section of a stadium, but differs from a stadium in that it does not wrap all or most of the way around. Grandstands may have basic bench seating, but usually have individual chairs like a stadium. Grandstands are also usually covered with a roof, but are open at the front. They are often multi-tiered.

Grandstands are found at places like Epsom Downs Racecourse and Atlanta Motor Speedway. They may also be found at fairgrounds, circuses, and outdoor arenas used for rodeos.

In Canada and the United States, smaller stands are called bleachers, and are usually far more basic and typically single-tiered (hence the difference from a "grand stand"). Early baseball games were often staged at fairgrounds, and the term "grandstand" came along when standalone baseball parks began to be built. A covered bleacher may be called a "pavilion", also to distinguish from the main "grandstand".

The term grandstanding, from the notion of playing to the people in the grandstands, is often used as a pejorative to describe someone intent on drawing attention to themself.

== Gallery ==
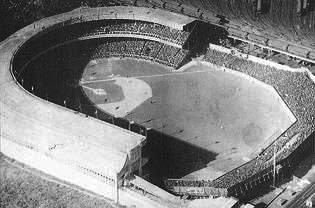
Polo Grounds grandstand and bleachers c. 1922

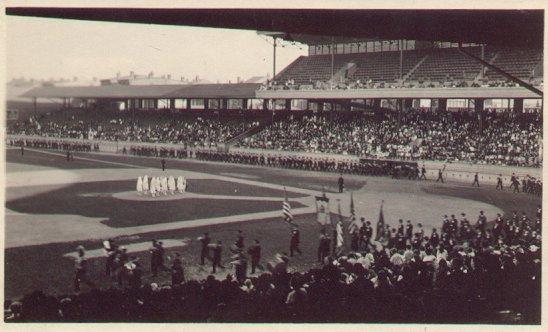
Redland Field pavilion and grandstand c. 1920

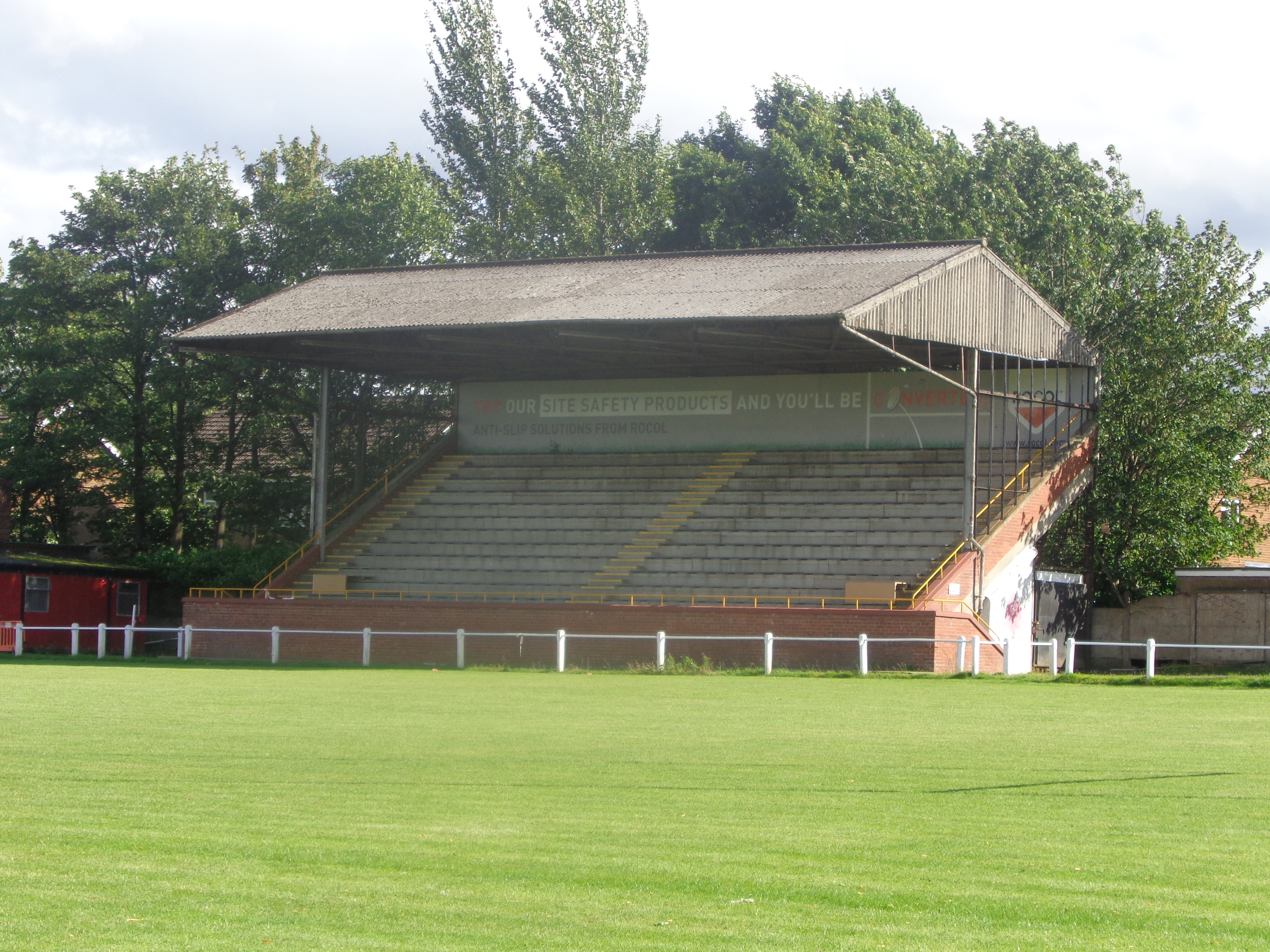
A smaller grandstand at Harrogate Rugby Club

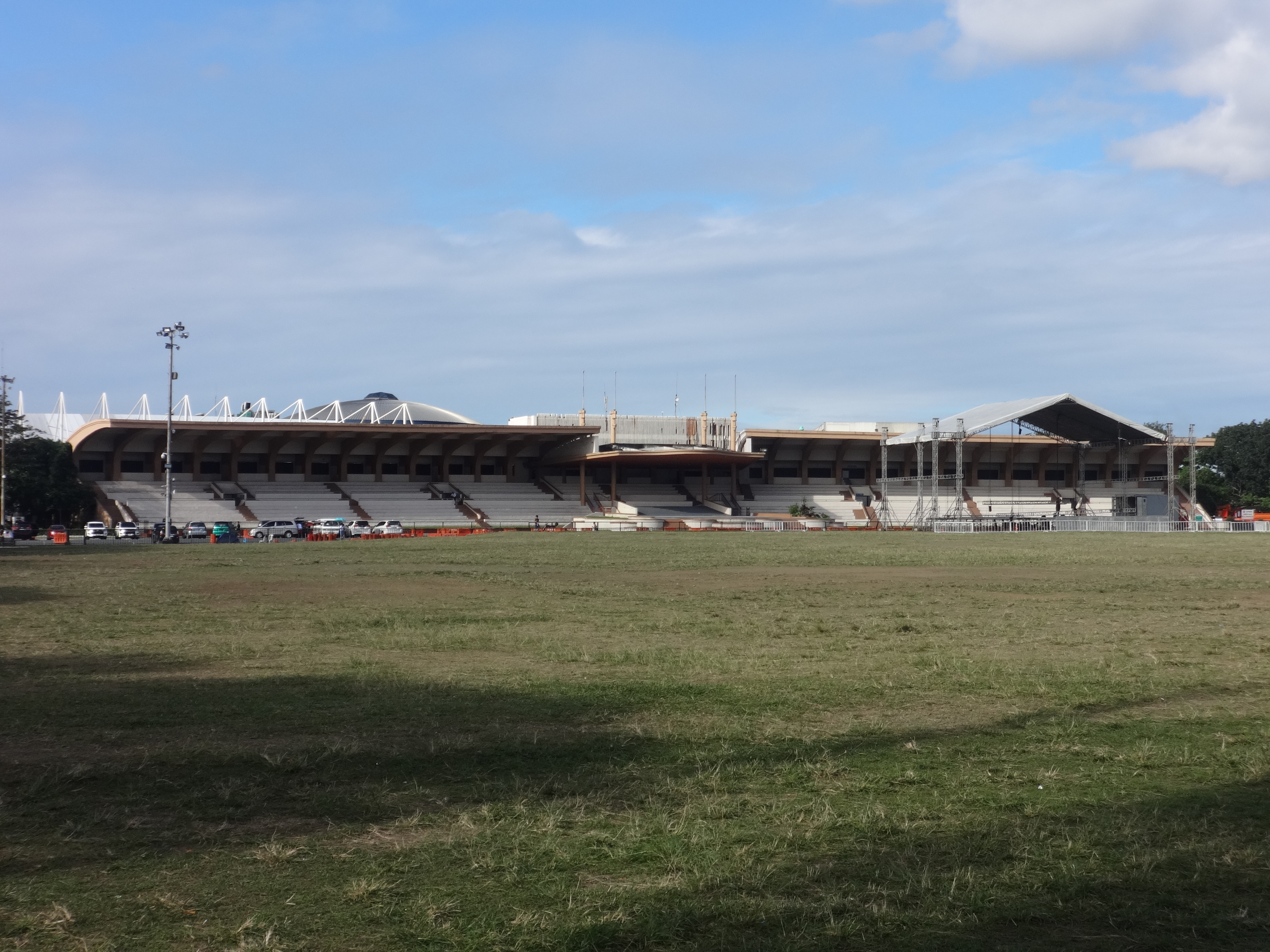
The Quirino Grandstand in Manila, a structure not part of a stadium or any sporting facility.

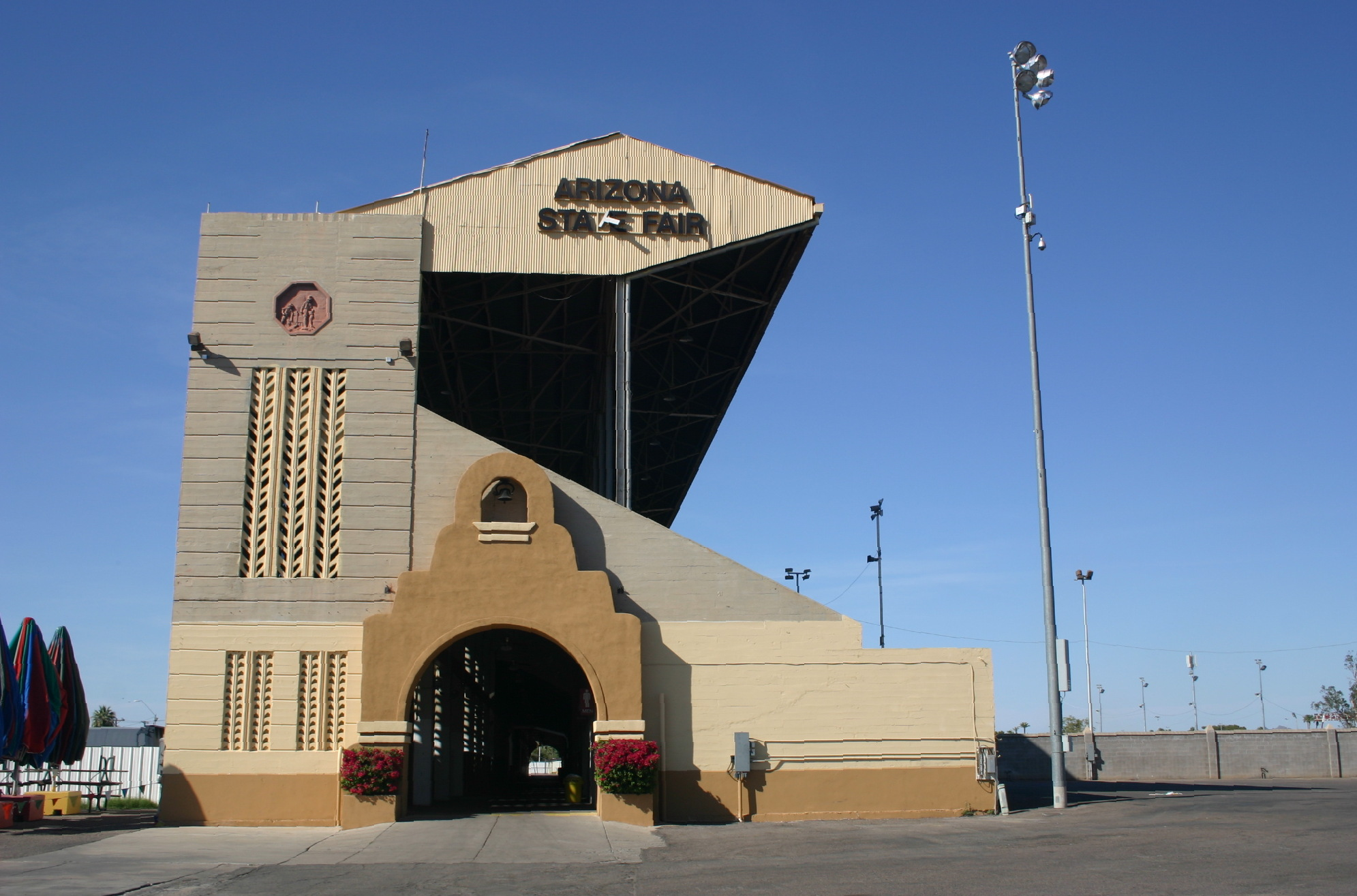
The Pueblo Deco styled grandstand at the Arizona State Fairgrounds in Phoenix, Arizona.

== See also ==
- Baseball park
- Bleacher
