= Rosa Maria Calles =

American dramatist

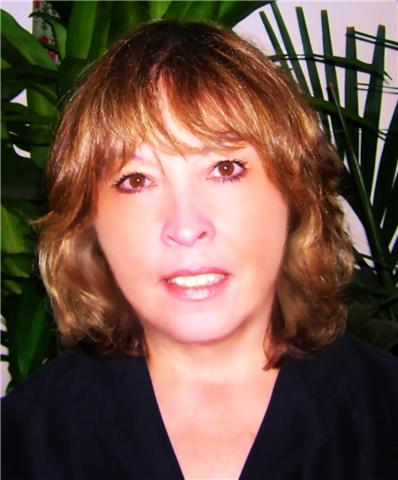
- Born: October 15, 1949; Tome, New Mexico
- Occupations: Visual artist, stage and film writer, director, and producer
- Writing career
- Notable works: Cuento de La Llorona/Tale of the Wailing Woman, The Grey Eminence of Taos, ¡Viva Nuevo México!

Rosa Maria Calles (born October 15, 1949) is a Hispanic American artist, playwright, producer, and director.

== Career ==
=== Writing ===
Calles' writing has been published in La Confluencia Magazine, Fiesta USA by Penguin Books, and the Victorian Gazette.

In 2000, she wrote, directed, and produced Cuento de La Llorona/Tale of the Wailing Woman, a two-act play.

=== Art ===
Calles' work has been shown at the Mexican American Museum in San Francisco, California; San Juan, Puerto Rico, Los Angeles, California; and several other major US cities. Her work is in the permanent collections of the Museum of International Folk Art, the Millicent Rogers Museum, and the Museum of Heritage and Arts all in New Mexico, and the Sacred Arts Museum in Eureka Springs, Arkansas. In 1993 Rosa Maria Calles was selected for inclusion by the Museum of International Folk Art in Santa Fe, New Mexico, to participate in "The Art of the Santera," a traveling show that toured American cities for two years.

== Personal life ==
In 1972, Calles married author Ray John de Aragon with whom she has four children.
