= Pueblo Deco architecture =

Architectural movement

Pueblo Deco is an architectural style in the Southwestern United States popular in the early 20th century. Pueblo Deco fused elements of Art Deco with the region's Pueblo and Territorial architectures, themselves inspired by Pueblo and Territorial Styles. Early Pueblo Deco design was influenced by architect Mary Colter's work, which incorporated Native American elements. The term was popularized by author Carla Breeze, whose 1984 Pueblo Deco: The Art Deco Architecture of the Southwest (written with Marcus Whiffen), and 1990 Pueblo Deco books described the fusion of southwestern motifs with the popular Deco style. Notable examples of buildings incorporating Pueblo Deco elements include the KiMo Theater in Albuquerque, New Mexico and the Arizona Biltmore Hotel in Phoenix, Arizona.

Pueblo Revival style is associated with Art Deco's borrowing of non-Western stylistic elements, principally from Egyptian, Asian and in this case indigenous sources. The style emphasizes applied ornament, often in metalwork, together with extensive tilework and wall murals. Additional structures incorporating Pueblo Deco design include the El Navajo Hotel and the McKinley County Courthouse, both in Gallup, New Mexico.

At the KiMo Theater, this decoration was applied to a modern structure of brick, steel and concrete. Its exterior combines tan stucco with multicolored terracotta ornaments. The decorative program includes Pueblo rain motifs, Navajo directional symbols and birds derived from Acoma Pueblo pottery.

== Gallery ==
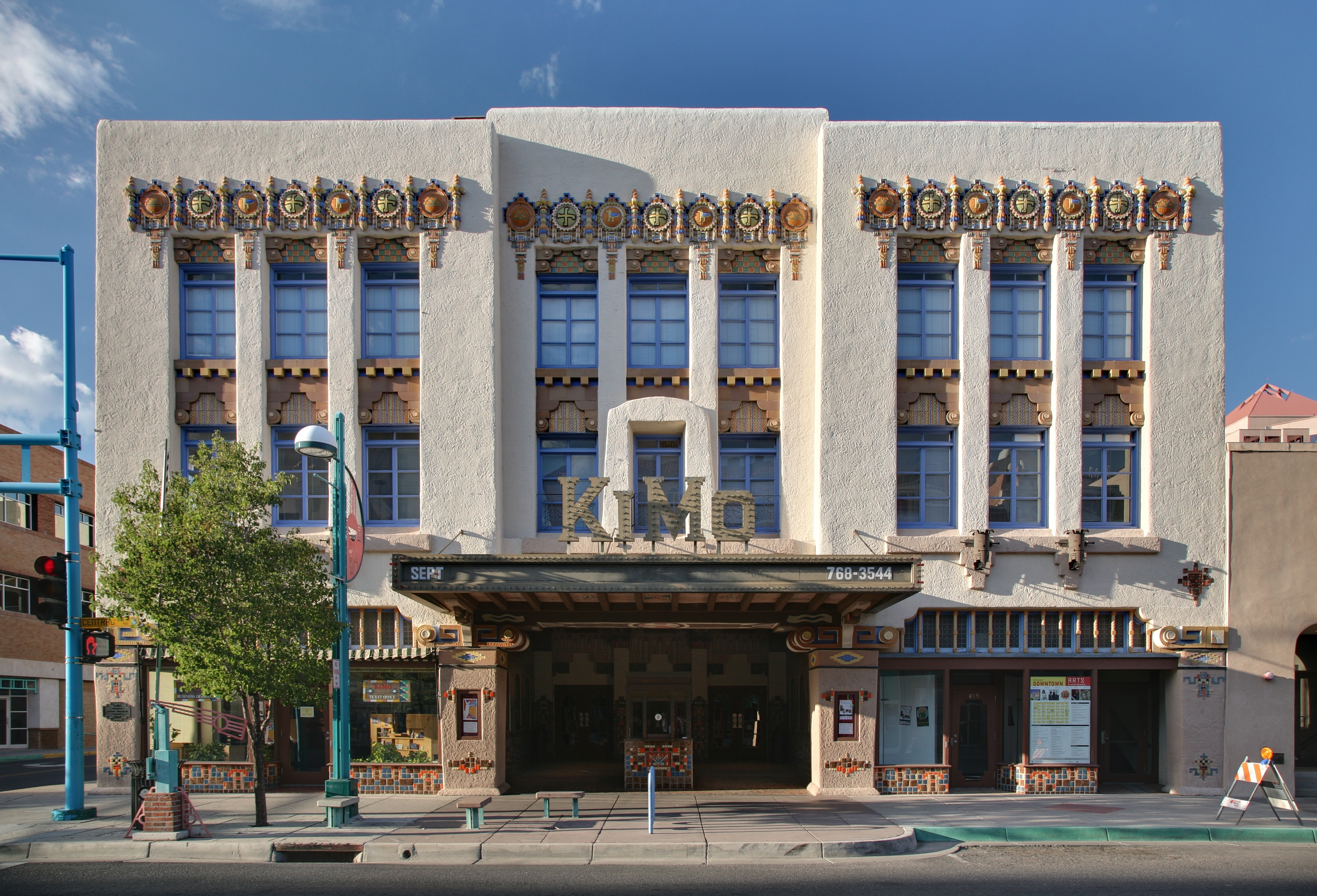
KiMo Theater in Albuquerque, New Mexico (1927)

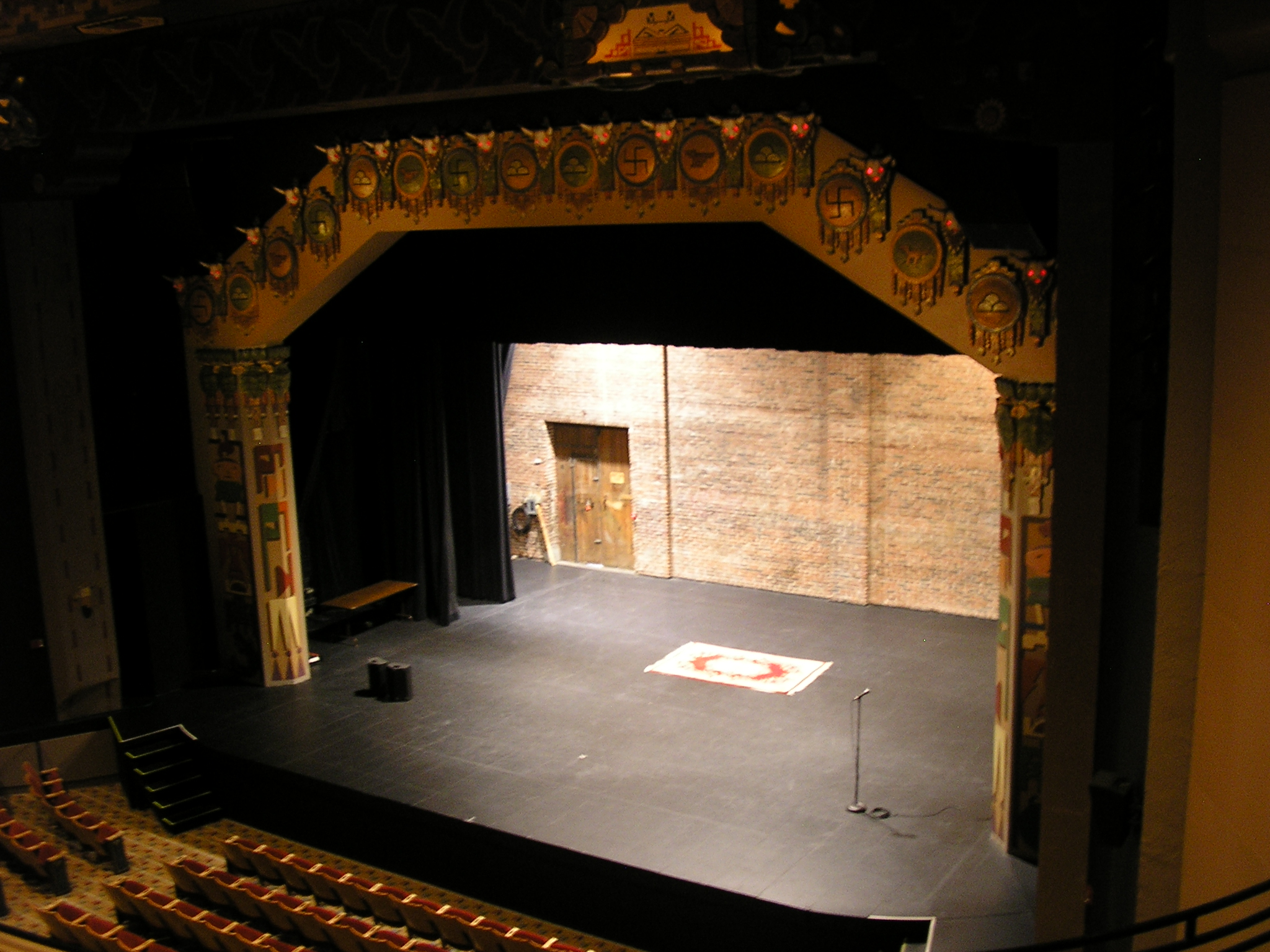
Stage of the KiMo Theater

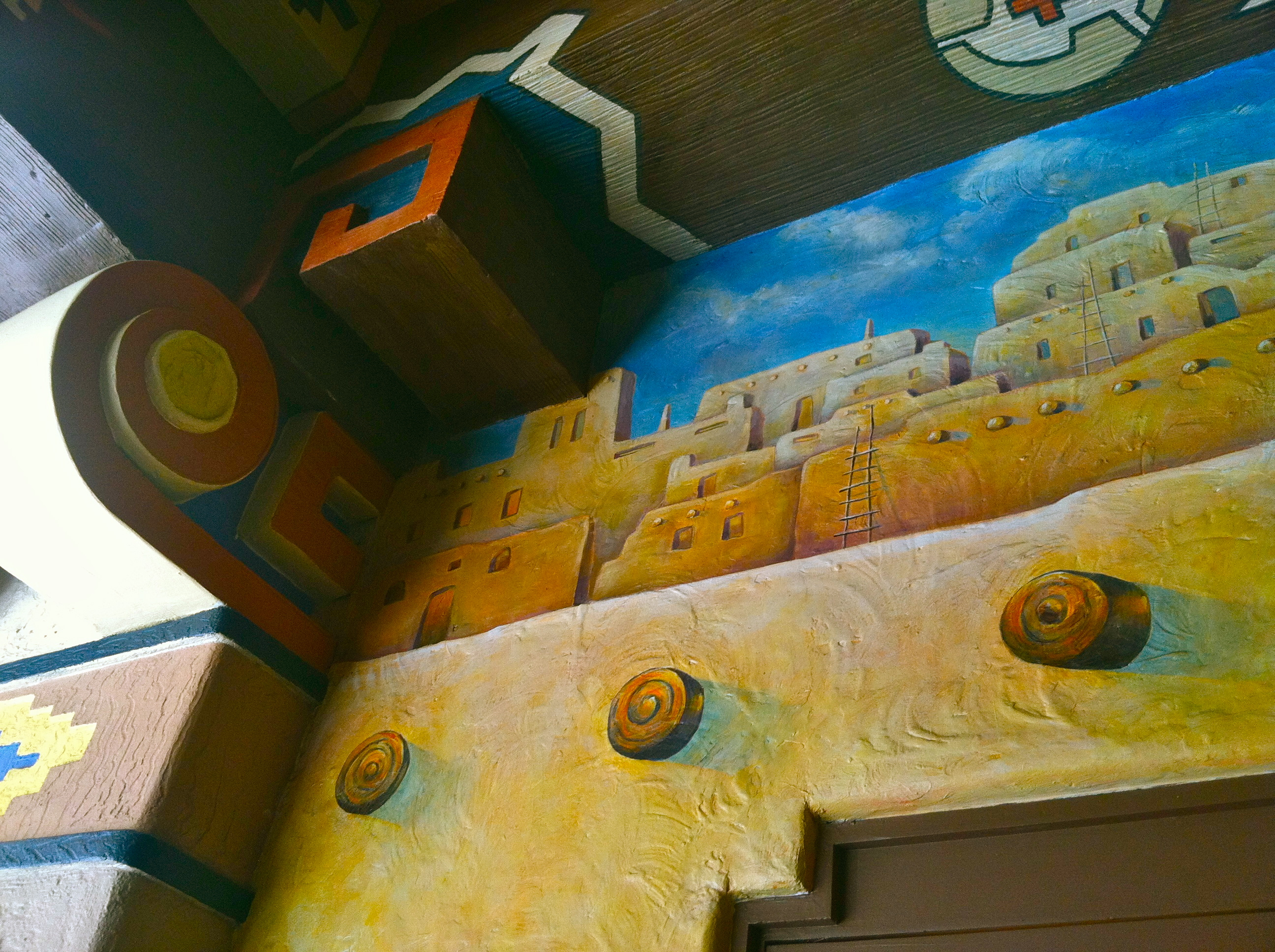
Interior detail of the KiMo Theater

Exterior detail of the KiMo Theater

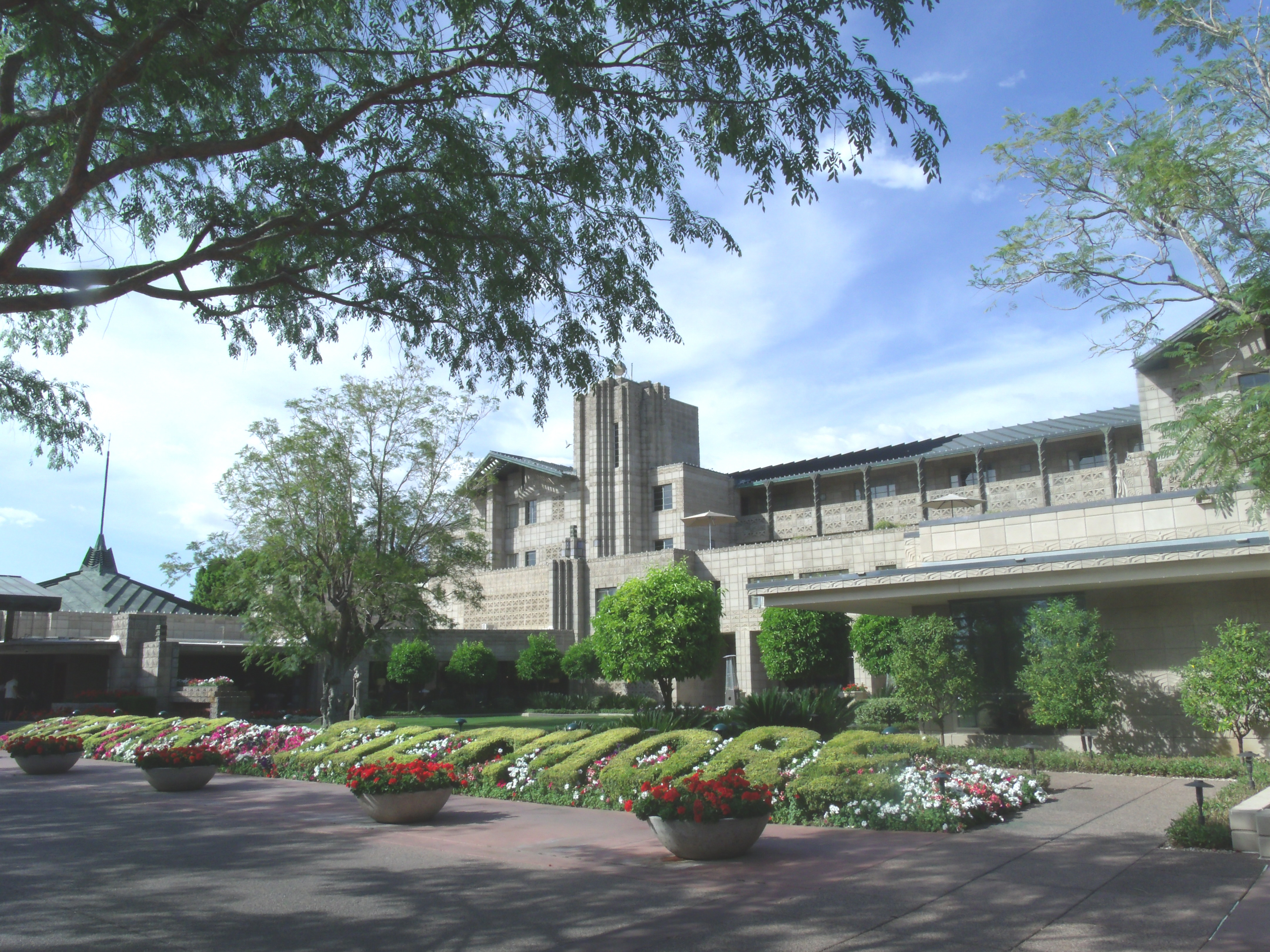
Arizona Biltmore Hotel in Phoenix, Arizona (1929)

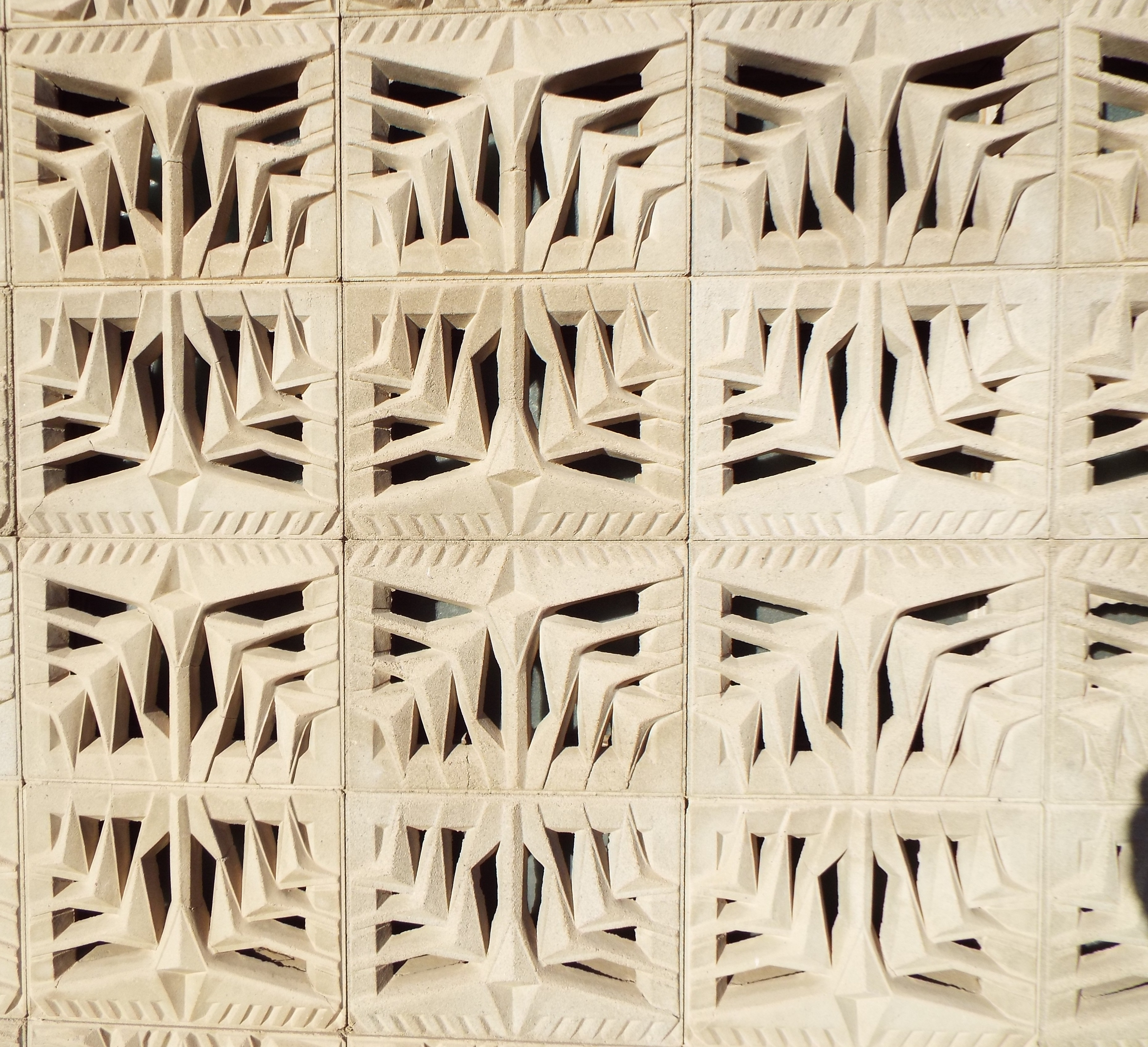
"Biltmore Blocks" of the Arizona Biltmore Hotel.

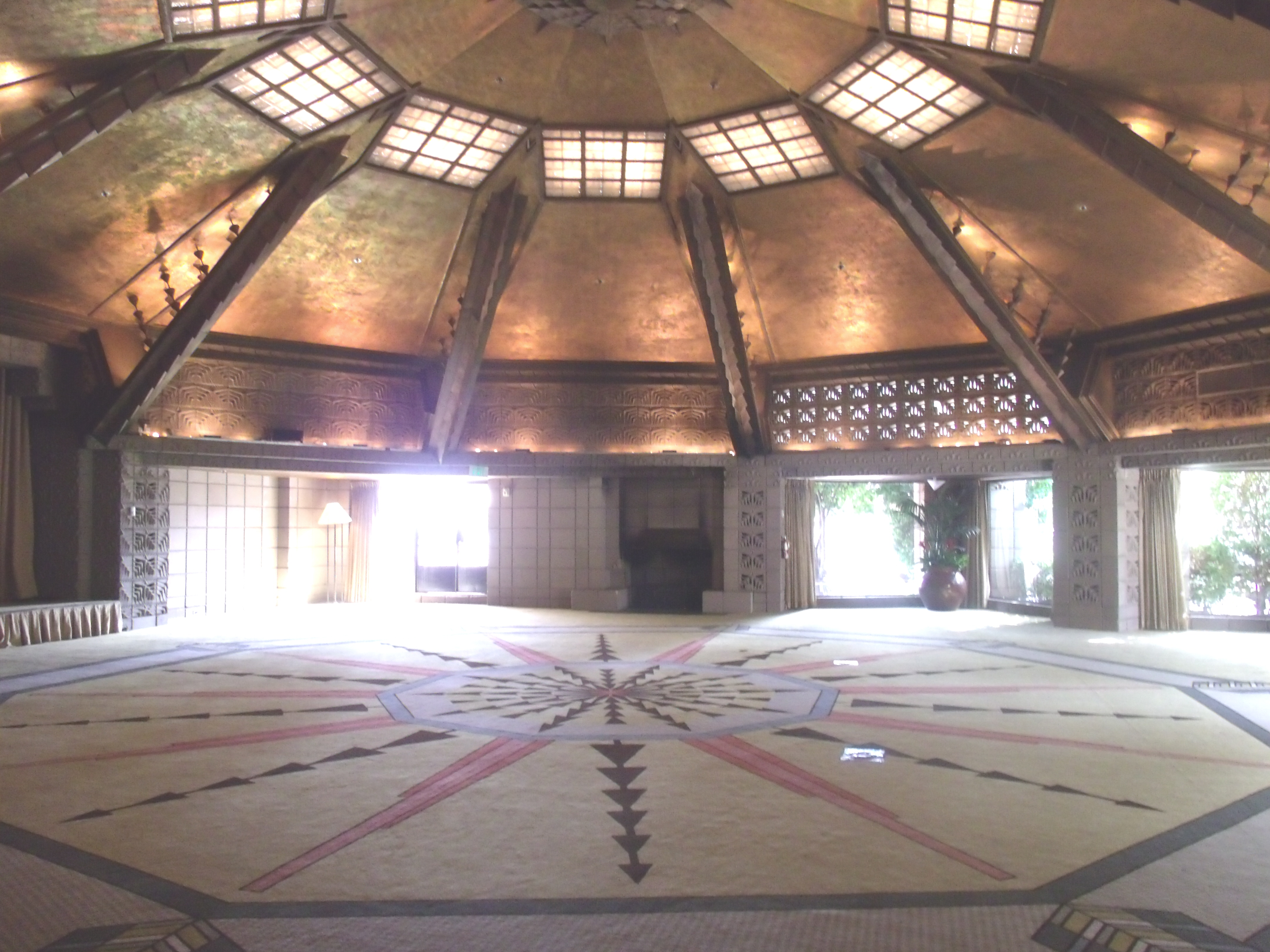
Interior of the Aztec Room in the Arizona Biltmore Hotel.

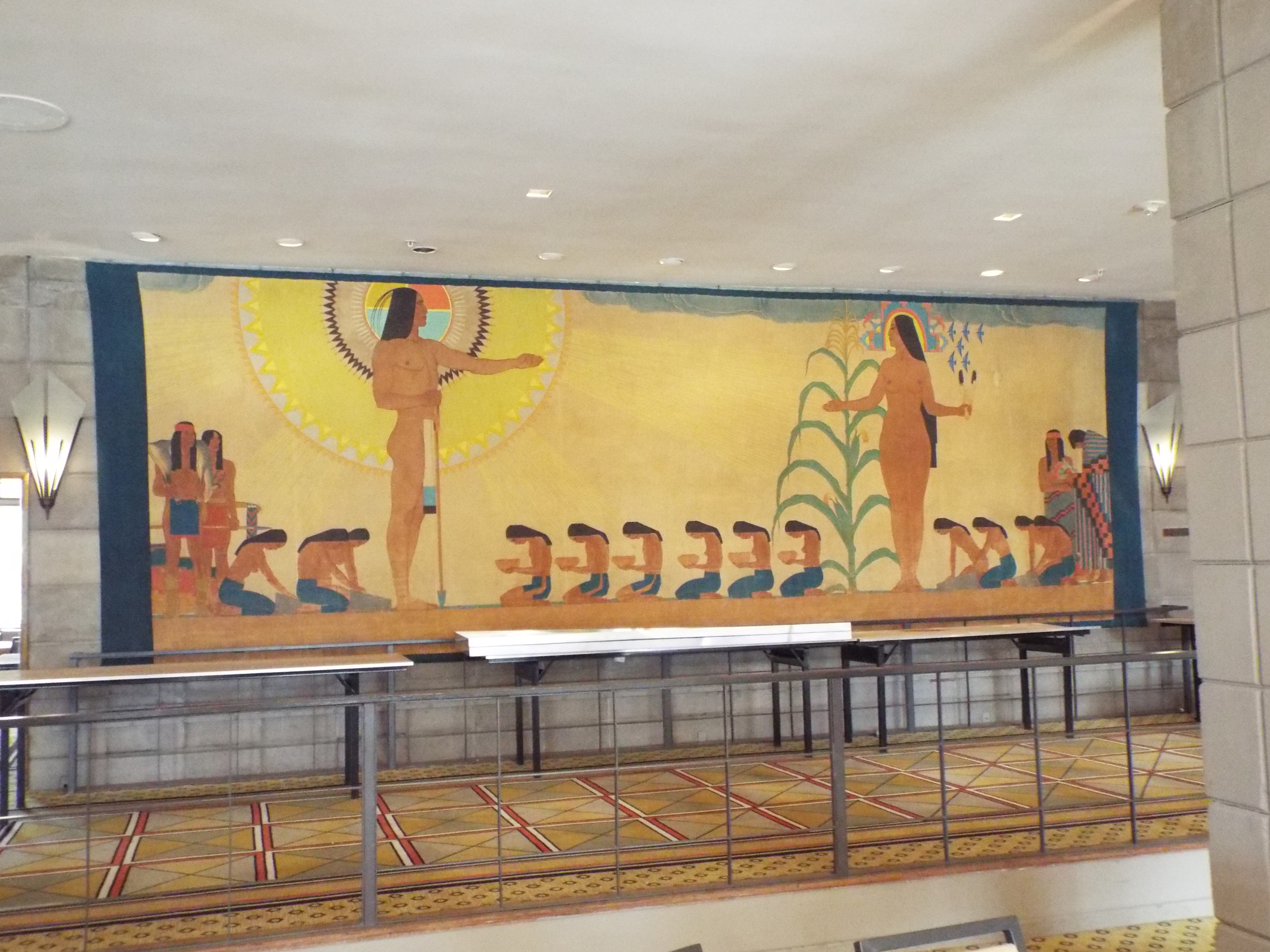
Depiction of the "Legend of the Sun" in the Arizona Biltmore Hotel.

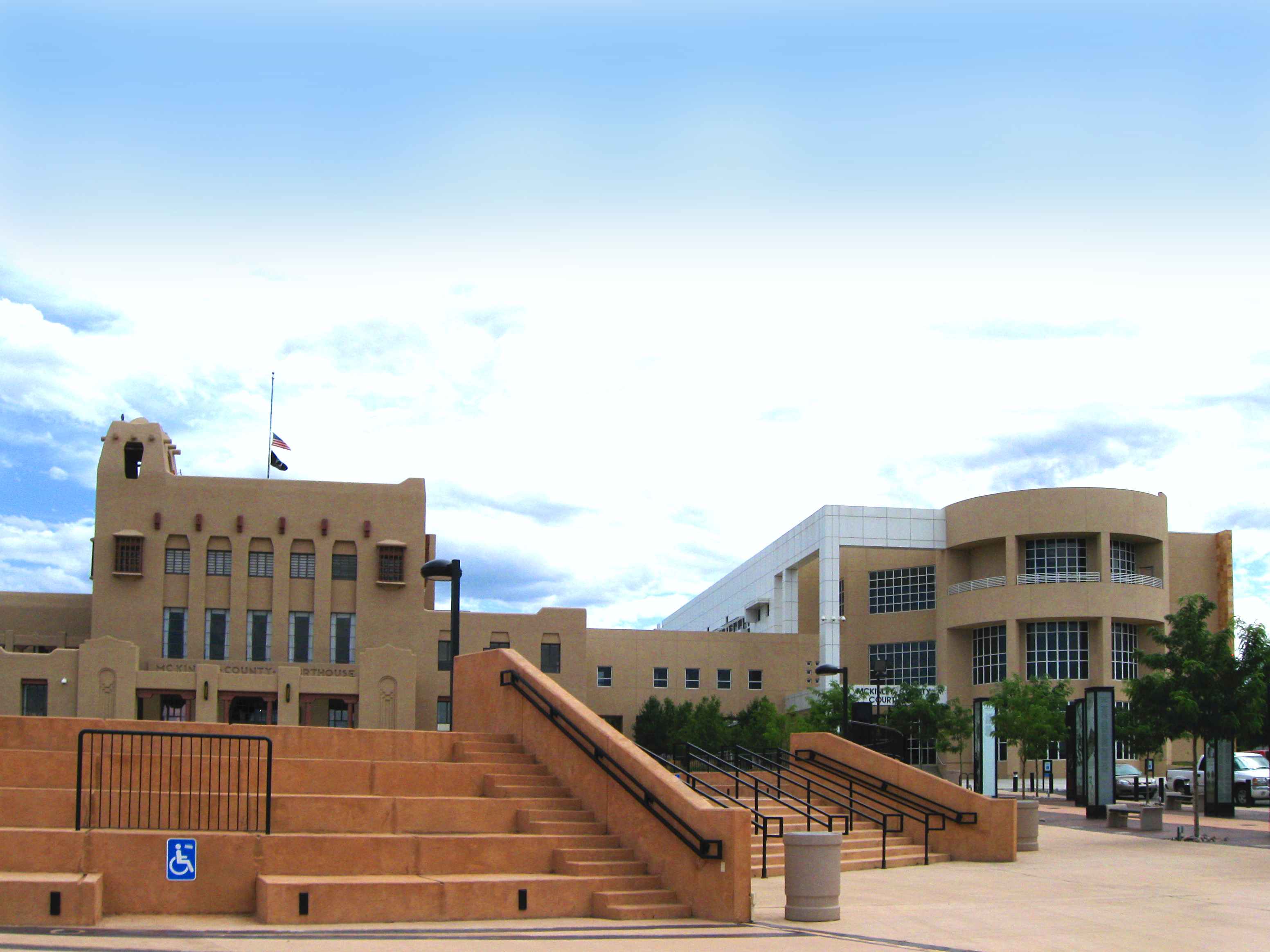
McKinley County Courthouse in Gallup, New Mexico (1938)

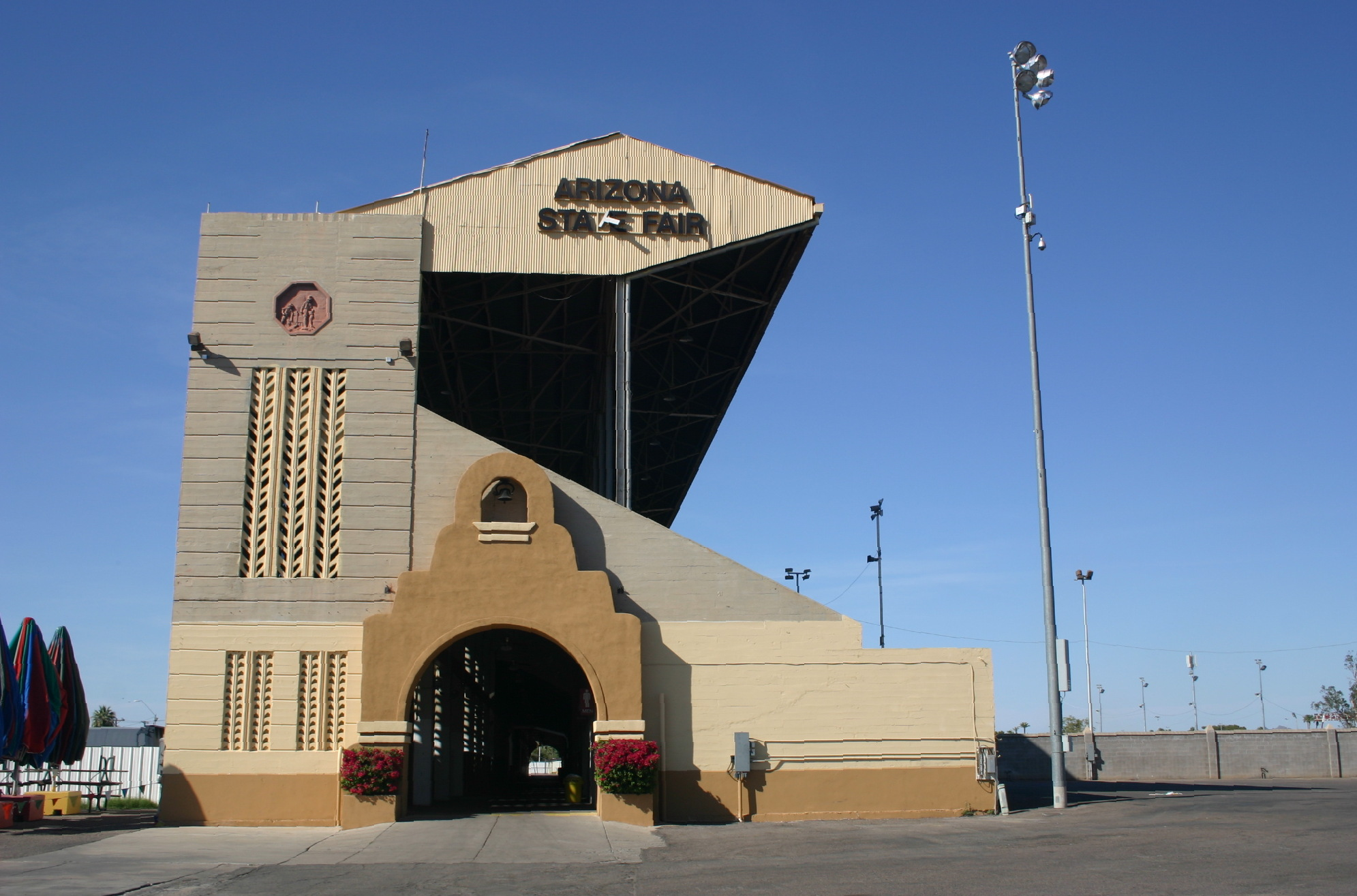
grandstand at the Arizona State Fairgrounds in Phoenix, Arizona (1936)
