= Portales Main Post Office =

- US Post Office--Portales Main
- U.S. National Register of Historic Places
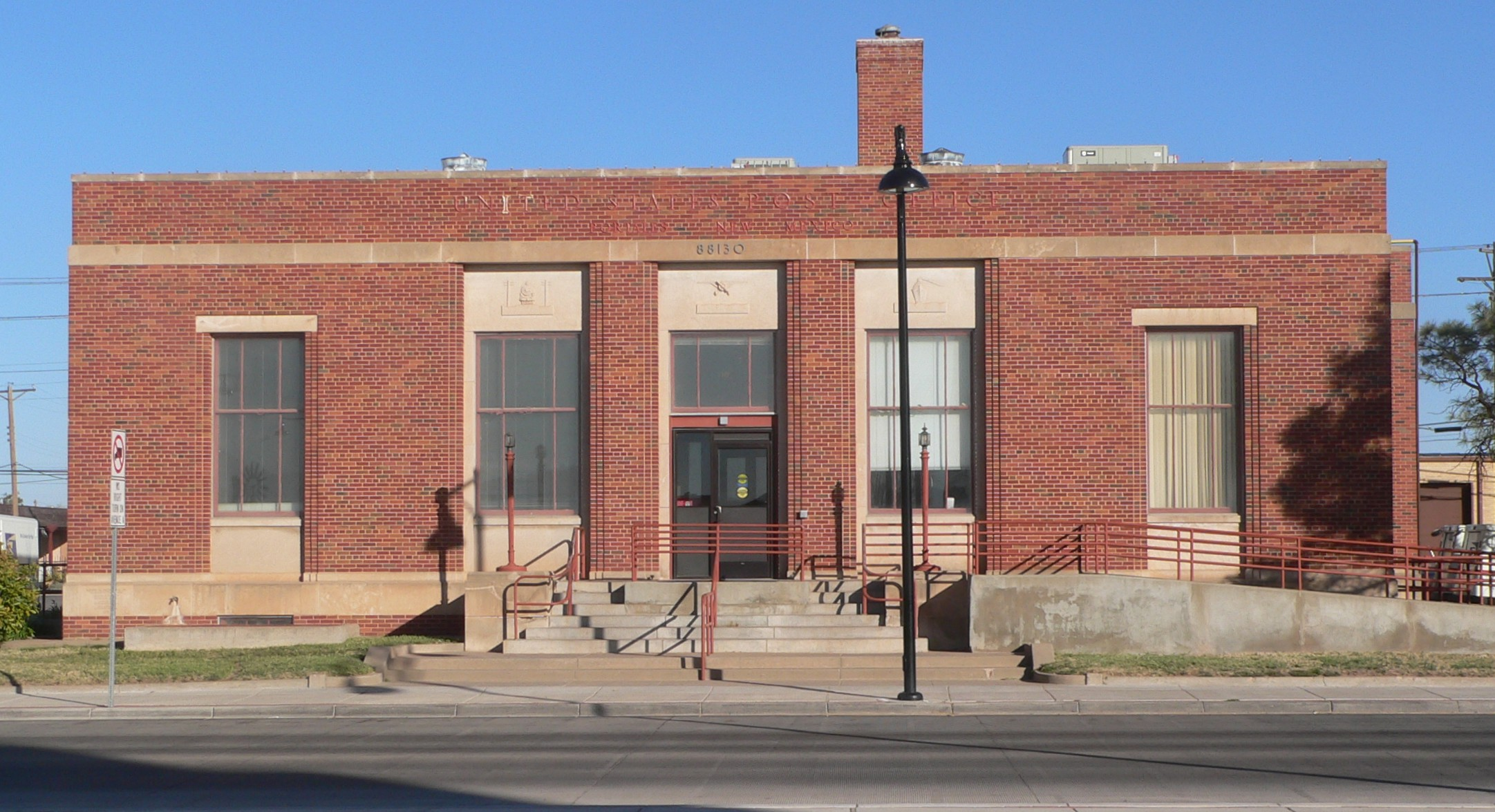

- Location within New Mexico Location within the United States
- Location: 116 W. First St., Portales, New Mexico
- Coordinates: 34.186356°N 103.338118°W
- Area: 0.5 acres (0.20 ha)
- Built: 1937
- Built by: Theodore Van Soelen
- Architect: Louis A. Simon
- Architectural style: Classical Revival
- MPS: US Post Offices in New Mexico MPS
- NRHP reference No.: 90000140
- Added to NRHP: February 23, 1990

The Portales Main Post Office, on W. 1st St. in Portales in Roosevelt County, New Mexico, was built in 1937. It was listed on the National Register of Historic Places in 1990 as US Post Office-Portales Main.

It is a one-story red brick building.

It includes an oil-on-canvas mural by Santa Fe artist Theodore Van Soelen titled "Buffalo Range", executed in 1939 under a New Deal program, the Federal Works Agency's Section of Fine Arts program. The mural is about 5 by 12 feet (1.5 m × 3.7 m).
