= New Mexico State Road 5 =

Former state highway in New Mexico, United States

State Road 5

Route information
- Maintained by NMDOT
- Length: 11 mi (18 km)
- Existed: early 1930s–1988

Major junctions
- West end: Puye Cliff Dwellings
- East end: NM 30 near Santa Clara Pueblo

Location
- Country: United States
- State: New Mexico
- Counties: Rio Arriba

Highway system
- New Mexico State Highway System; Interstate; US; State; Scenic
← NM 4	→ NM 6

State Road 5 (NM 5) was a state highway in the US state of New Mexico. NM 5's western terminus was in Puye, and the eastern terminus was at NM 30 near Santa Clara Pueblo. It was established in the early-1930s and was removed from the state highway system in 1988 and became Indian Route 601.

== Major intersections ==
The entire route is in Santa Clara Pueblo, Rio Arriba County.

mi	km	Destinations	Notes
0	0.0	Puye Cliff Dwellings	
11	18	NM 30	
1.000 mi = 1.609 km; 1.000 km = 0.621 mi
