= Tranquilino Luna House =

- U.S. National Register of Historic Places
- Location within New Mexico Location within the United States
- Location: At the junction of U.S. Route 85 and State Road 6, southwest of Los Lunas, New Mexico
- Coordinates: 34°48′26″N 106°44′08″W
- Area: 0.3 acres (0.12 ha)
- Built: c.1880-85
- Architectural style: Late Victorian, Italianate
- NRHP reference No.: 75001175
- Added to NRHP: April 16, 1975

The Tranquilino Luna House, near Los Lunas, New Mexico, dates from 1882. It was listed on the National Register of Historic Places in 1975.

It is a large Victorian-style house built of adobe terrones (large slabs). Its original entry porch was replaced in early 20th century by a two-story four-column portico.

It was a home of the politically powerful Luna family, descendants of Domingo de Luna, and was deemed "probably the best example of an extant adobe Victorian residence in New Mexico".
