= Theodore Van Soelen =

American artist (1890–1964)

- Born: February 15, 1890; St. Paul, Minnesota
- Died: May 14, 1964 (aged 74); Santa Fe, New Mexico
- Resting place: Rosario Cemetery, Santa Fe, NM
- Education: St. Paul Art Institute; Pennsylvania Academy of Fine Art
- Known for: Western landscapes, portrait painting, murals
- Spouse: Virginia Morrison Carr
- Elected: National Academician

Theodore Van Soelen (1890–1964) was a New Mexico-based artist best known for his Western landscapes and portraits.

Van Soelen was born in 1890 in St. Paul, Minnesota. He studied at the St. Paul Art Institute from 1909 to 1911 and then at the Pennsylvania Academy of the Fine Arts. From that school he won a "Cresson Traveling Scholarship" for study in Europe in 1913 and 1914. After his return a doctor recommended him to move west after a serious case of tuberculosis and pneumonia in 1916. He first settled in Albuquerque, New Mexico before moving to Santa Fe in 1922, and, finally, Tesuque in 1926. He died in Santa Fe in 1964.

== Life and career ==
He made his successful career both in the Eastern and Southwestern parts of the United States. His favorite theme was painting of ranch scenes performed in realistic manner, but he also is known by his landscapes and portraits. For better understanding of the theme he lived in towns and ranches throughout the state of New Mexico and spent a year at San Ysidro's Indian Trading Post. It was in that period that his paintings were exhibited in the Cincinnati Art Museum and obtained a national attention.

He moved to Santa Fe after his marriage to Virginia Carr in 1922. And since 1926 they resided in Tesuque. In 1930s he established a second studio in Cornwall, Connecticut and gave exposure of his paintings in the East. He painted several post office murals, including one at the Portales Main Post Office, on W. 1st St. in Portales in Roosevelt County, New Mexico. He also did murals in the Grant County Courthouse in Silver City, New Mexico, and in the post offices of Waurika, Oklahoma and Livingston, Texas.

The Portales mural is an oil-on-canvas mural titled "Buffalo Range", executed in 1939 under a New Deal program, the Federal Works Agency's Section of Fine Arts program. The mural is about 5 by 12 feet (1.5 m × 3.7 m).

Van Soelen was elected as a member to the National Academy of the US and had his works exhibited in the East museums the likes of the National Academy and the Chicago Art Institute. His works were exhibited at the Carnegie Institute, the Metropolitan Museum of Art, the San Francisco Museum of Art, and Los Angeles County Museum of Art. He was named Honorary Fellow in Fine Arts by the School of American Research in Santa Fe in 1960.
