= Dr. William Frederick Wittwer House =

- U.S. National Register of Historic Places
- Location: NM 6, W of US 85, Los Lunas, New Mexico
- Coordinates: 34°48′29″N 106°44′09″W
- Area: less than one acre
- Built: 1904
- NRHP reference No.: 87000131
- Added to NRHP: February 27, 1987

The Dr. William Frederick Wittwer House, in Los Lunas, New Mexico, was built in 1904. It was listed on the National Register of Historic Places in 1987. It is located on New Mexico State Road 6, just west of U.S. Route 85.

It was home of a medical doctor who served the area for more than 60 years, often as the only doctor there, until his death at age 93, in 1965. His efforts eliminated pellagra in the area, which was previously a problem among the native American and Hispanic population.
