= Miguel E. Baca House =

- U.S. National Register of Historic Places
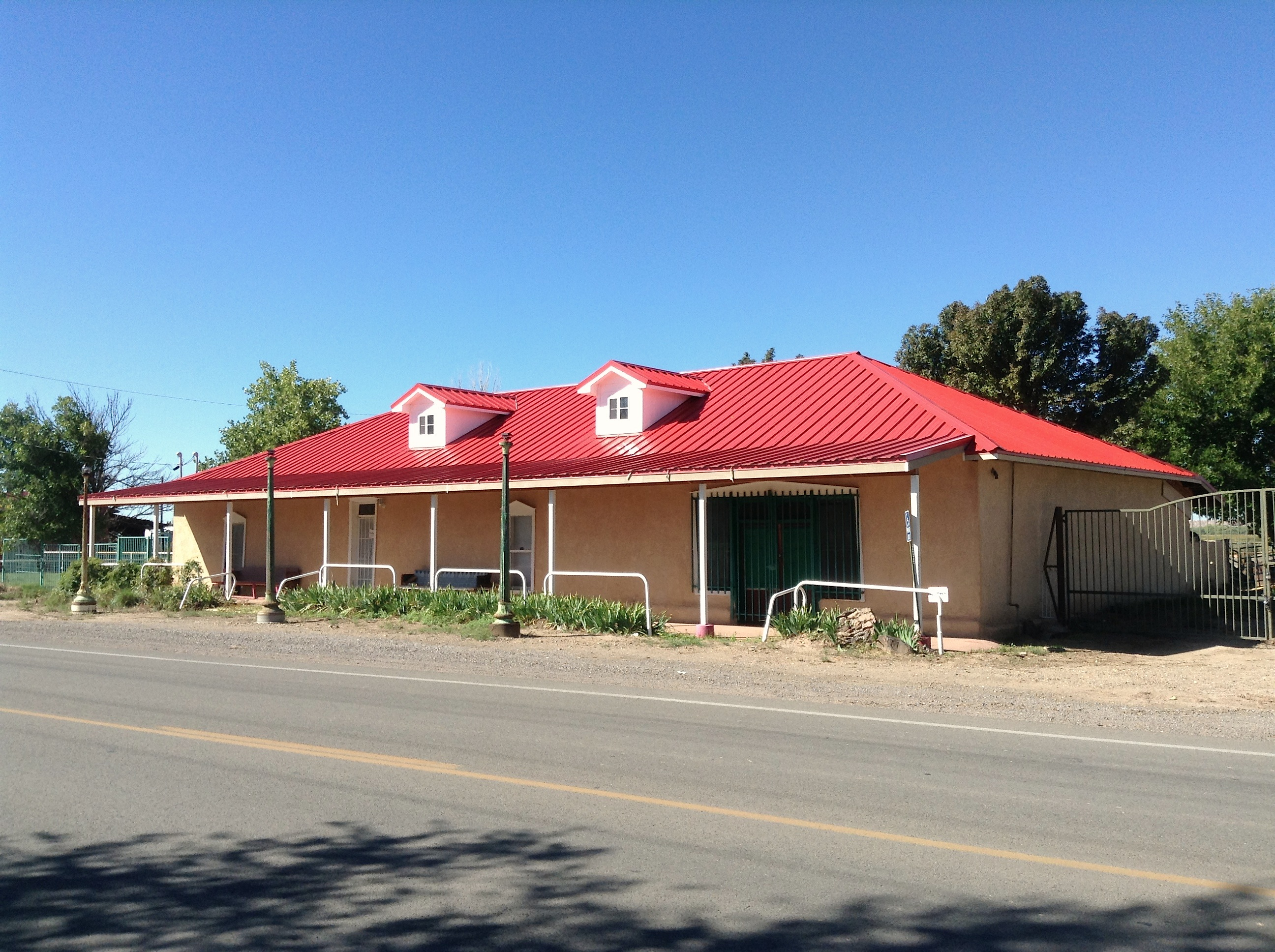

- Location within New Mexico
- Location: NM 47, Adelino, New Mexico
- Coordinates: 34°42′42″N 106°43′49″W
- Area: 0.3 acres (0.12 ha)
- Built: 1895
- NRHP reference No.: 78001835
- Added to NRHP: December 11, 1978

The Miguel E. Baca House, in Adelino, New Mexico on what is now New Mexico State Road 47, was built in 1895. It was listed on the National Register of Historic Places in 1978. The listing included three contributing buildings.

Historic function: Domestic; Agriculture/subsistence; Commerce/trade Historic subfunction: Department Store; Processing; Single Dwelling; Animal Facility Criteria: event, architecture/engineering

The house was built around 1895 and is 80 by 30 feet (24.4 m × 9.1 m) in plan. It was built with 18 inches (0.46 m) thick adobe walls and a flat roof, and it served as Miguel E. Baca's house and business headquarters. He operated a store, saloon and dancehall on the property or nearby.

A hipped roof was added in the 1920s. As of 1978 a concrete foundation had recently been inserted, strengthening the walls.

It is about 2 miles (3.2 km) south of Tome, New Mexico.
