= Luna County Courthouse =

- Luna County Courthouse and Park
- U.S. National Register of Historic Places
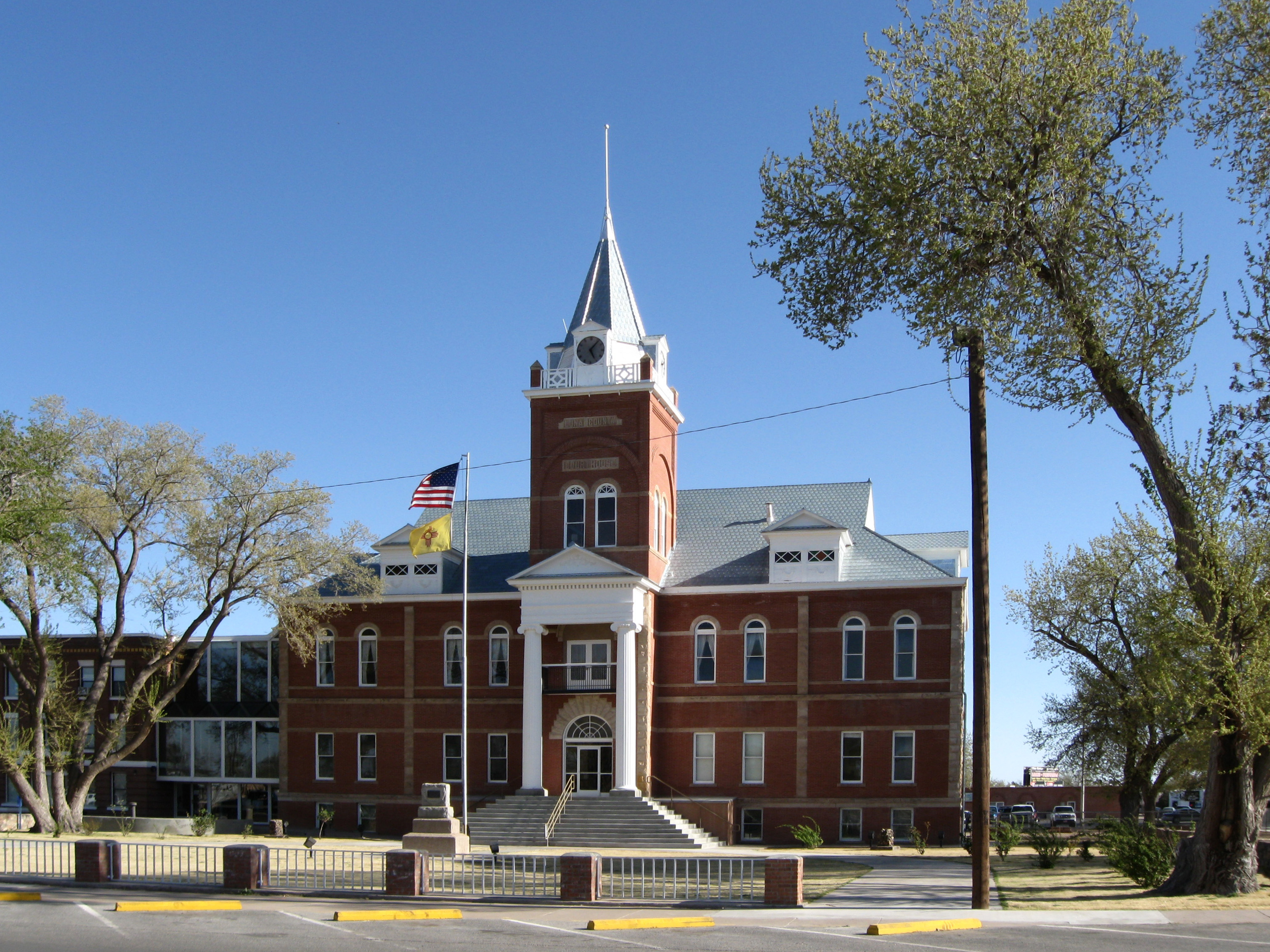

- Location within New Mexico
- Location: 700 S. Silver Ave., Deming, New Mexico
- Coordinates: 32°17′21″N 107°45′24″W
- Area: 6.1 acres (2.5 ha)
- Built: 1910
- Built by: J.C. Huff
- Architect: W.B. Corwin
- Architectural style: Greek Revival
- NRHP reference No.: 77000925
- Added to NRHP: October 5, 1977

The Luna County Courthouse in Deming, New Mexico was listed on the National Register of Historic Places in 1977. The listing included a 6.1 acres (2.5 ha) area, with one contributing building, the 1910-built courthouse.

The courthouse is an "imposing" 100 by 50 feet (30 m × 15 m) red brick building designed by architect W.B. Corwin and built by El Paso builder J.C. Huff. It has a tall clock tower and a Greek Revival portico. The courthouse was expanded by a 20 by 75 feet (6.1 m × 22.9 m) addition on the south side of the building in 1963.

The property includes the Howard War Memorial, a 1921-built granite monument to the memory of Claude Close Howard, the only fatality of Luna County's in World War I. Howard, serving in the machine gun company of the 356th Infantry Regiment was killed in the Saint-Mihiel area in France, on September 24, 1918.
