= Silver City Historic District (New Mexico) =

Historic district in New Mexico, United States

- U.S. National Register of Historic Places
- U.S. Historic district
- NM State Register of Cultural Properties
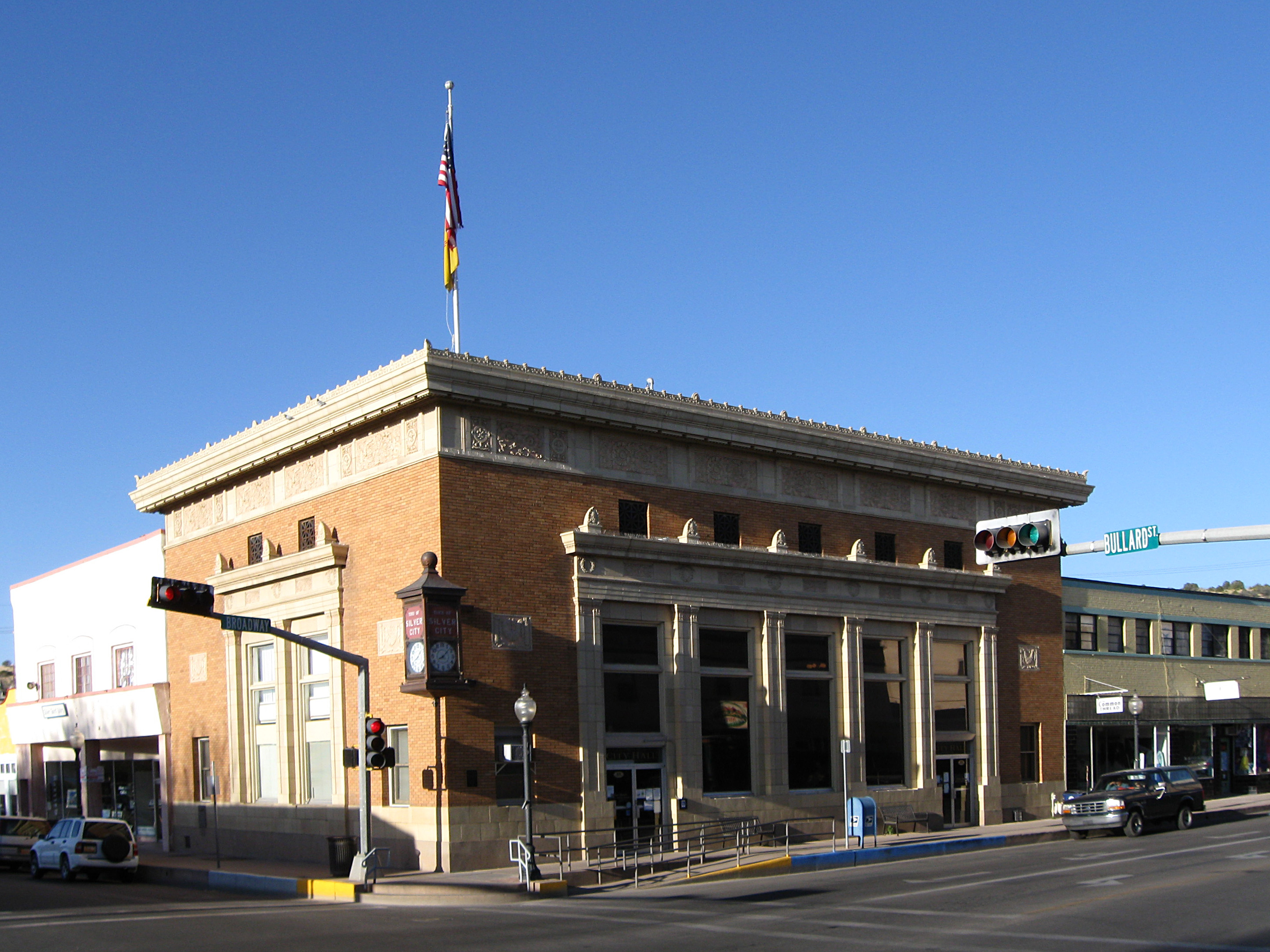
- City Hall, one of the buildings in the district

- Location within New Mexico Location within the United States
- Location: Roughly bounded by Black, College, Hudson, and Spring Sts., Silver City, New Mexico
- Coordinates: 32°46′19″N 108°16′38″W
- Area: 88 acres (36 ha)
- Architect: Multiple
- Architectural style: Classical Revival, Second Empire, Mission/Spanish Revival
- NRHP reference No.: 78001817
- NMSRCP No.: 197

Significant dates
- Added to NRHP: May 23, 1978
- Designated NMSRCP: July 31, 1970

The Silver City Historic District is a historically significant section of downtown Silver City, New Mexico, United States.

== Description ==
Within its boundaries of Black, College, Hudson, and Spring streets are located thirty-eight contributing properties, spread out over an area of 88 acres (36 ha). The properties include some of Silver City's most significant commercial, government, religious, and residential buildings. The commercial area is mainly located along Broadway and Bullard Street; most of the commercial buildings are two-story brick structures, and many feature cast iron storefronts. The Grant County Courthouse, which was designed and built in 1930, is located at the end of Broadway. The houses in the district are also mainly brick, a locally abundant building material; they represent a variety of architectural styles, including a number of Second Empire works. Five churches are included in the district; these include Gothic Revival and Mission Revival designs.

The historic district was added to the National Register of Historic Places in 1978.

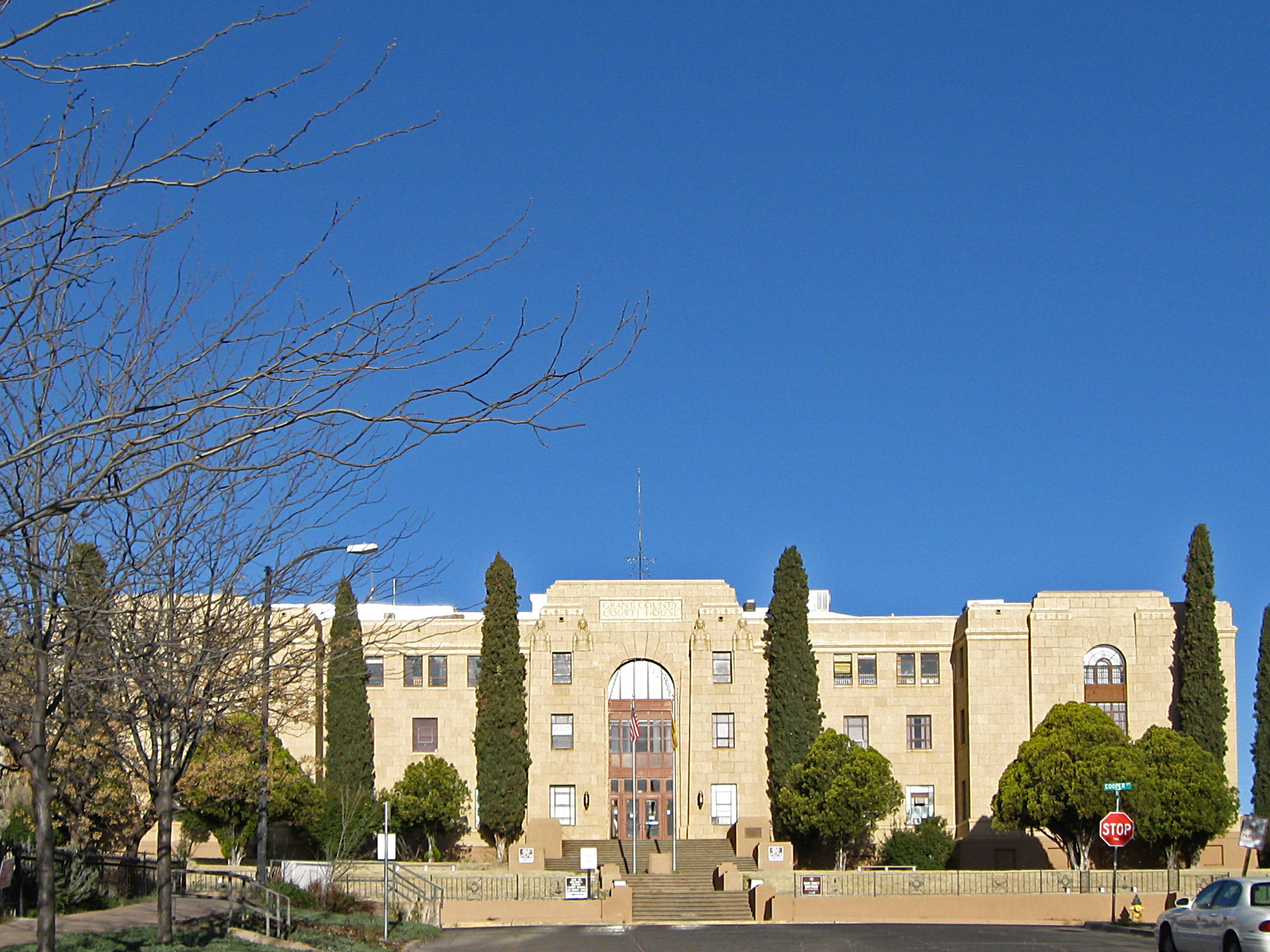
Grant County Courthouse

The Grant County Courthouse, built in 1930, includes a mural by Santa Fe artist Theodore Van Soelen.

== See also ==
- National Register of Historic Places listings in Grant County, New Mexico
