= El Cerro Tome Site =

- U.S. National Register of Historic Places
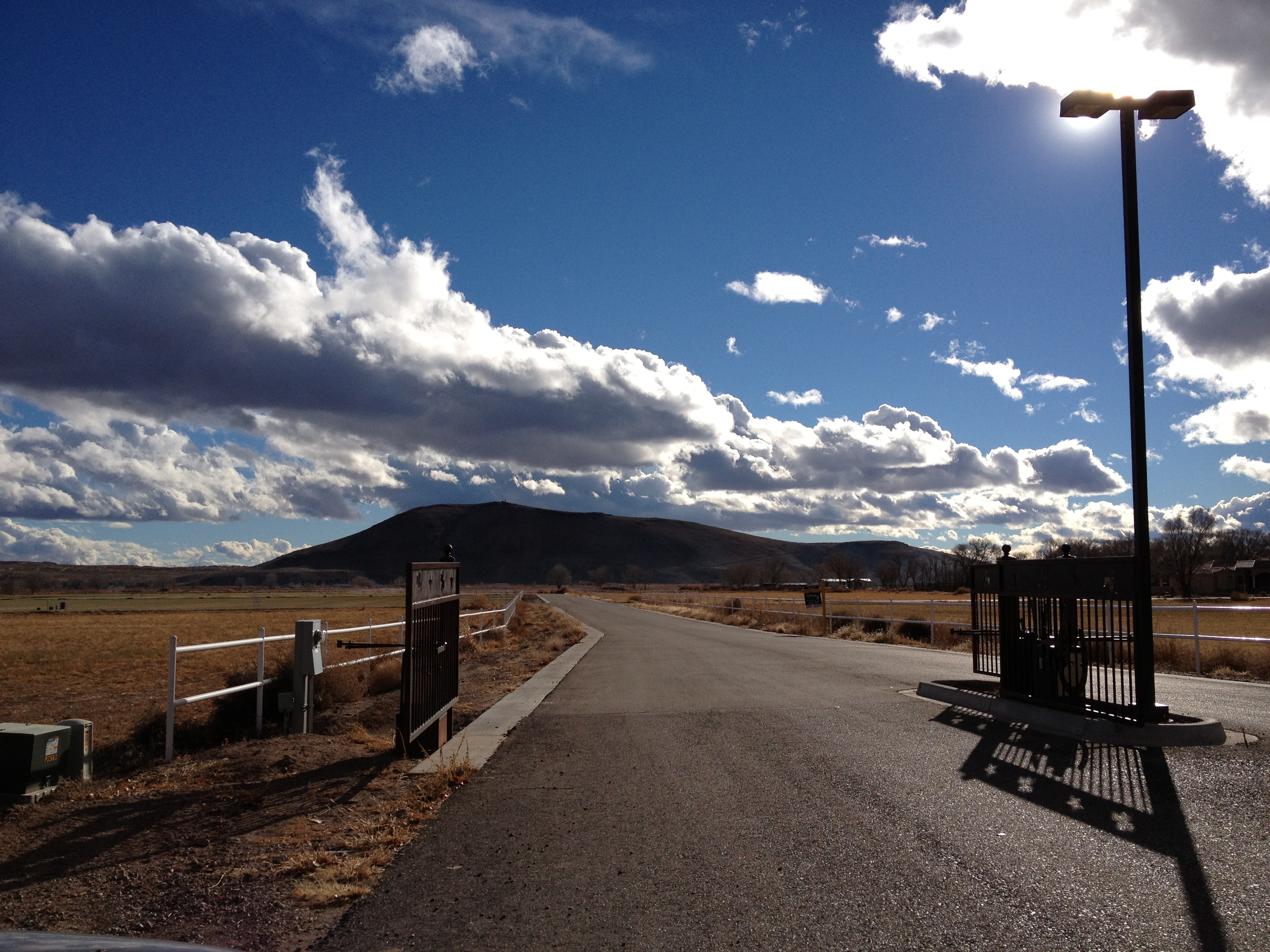
- El Cerro de Tome

- Location within New Mexico
- Nearest city: Tome, New Mexico
- Coordinates: 34°45′20″N 106°42′19″W
- Area: 179 acres (72 ha)
- NRHP reference No.: 96000739
- Added to NRHP: July 9, 1996

The El Cerro Tome Site is a site of petroglyphs and other prehistoric artifacts near Tome, New Mexico which was listed on the National Register of Historic Places in 1996.

It is located about 0.5 miles (0.80 km) east of the junction of New Mexico State Road 47 and Tome Hill Rd.
