= Belen City Hall =

- U.S. National Register of Historic Places
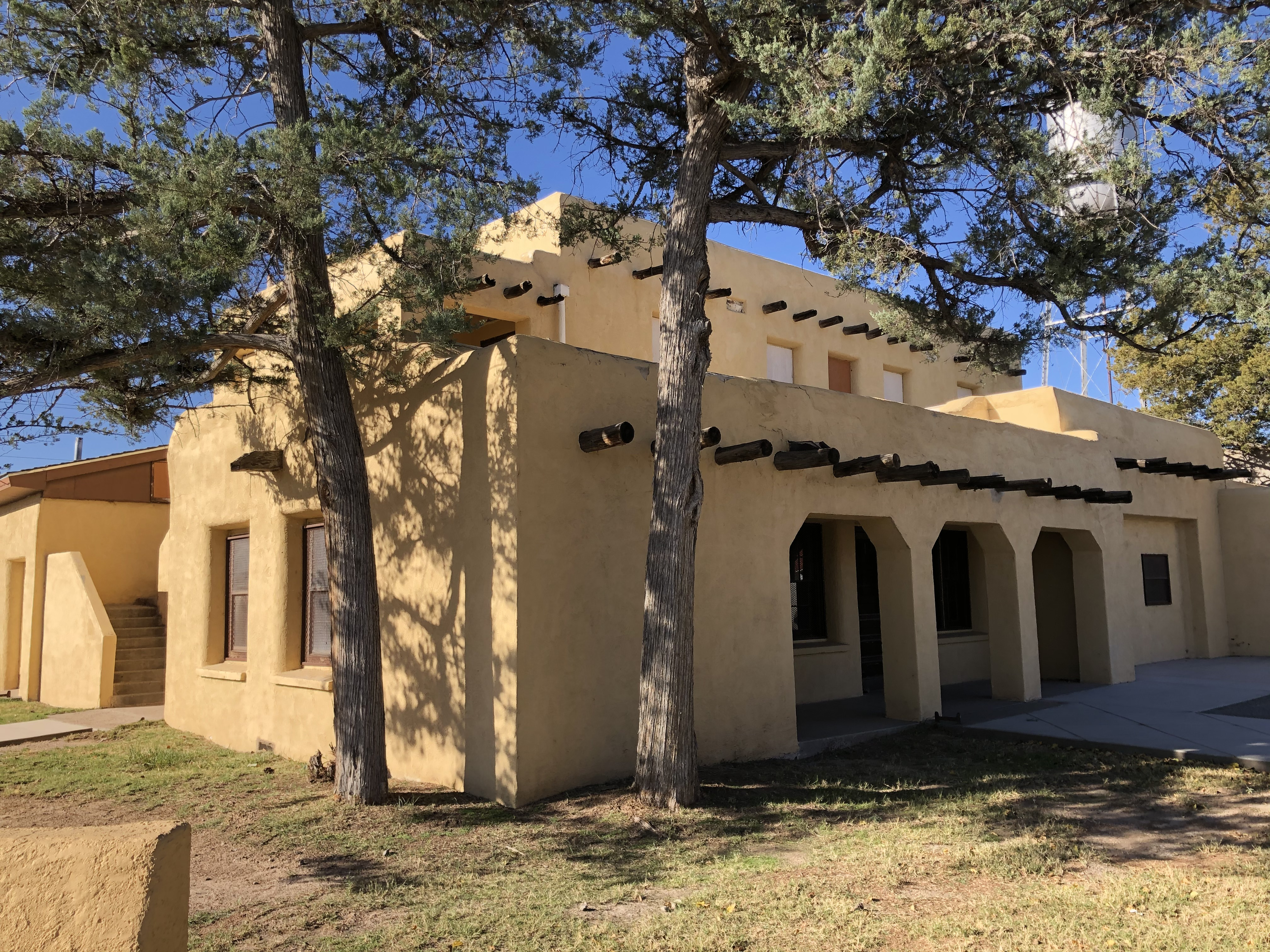

- Location within New Mexico
- Location: 503 Becker Ave, Belen, New Mexico
- Coordinates: 34°39′37″N 106°46′24″W
- Built: 1937
- Architectural style: Pueblo Revival
- NRHP reference No.: 100003676
- Added to NRHP: April 29, 2019

The Belen City Hall, at 503 Becker Ave. in Belen, New Mexico, was listed on the National Register of Historic Places in 2019.

It is also known as Old Belen City Hall.

It was built in 1937 by the Works Progress Administration, using local labor and adobe, and is Pueblo Revival in style.
