= Felipe Chaves House =

- U.S. National Register of Historic Places
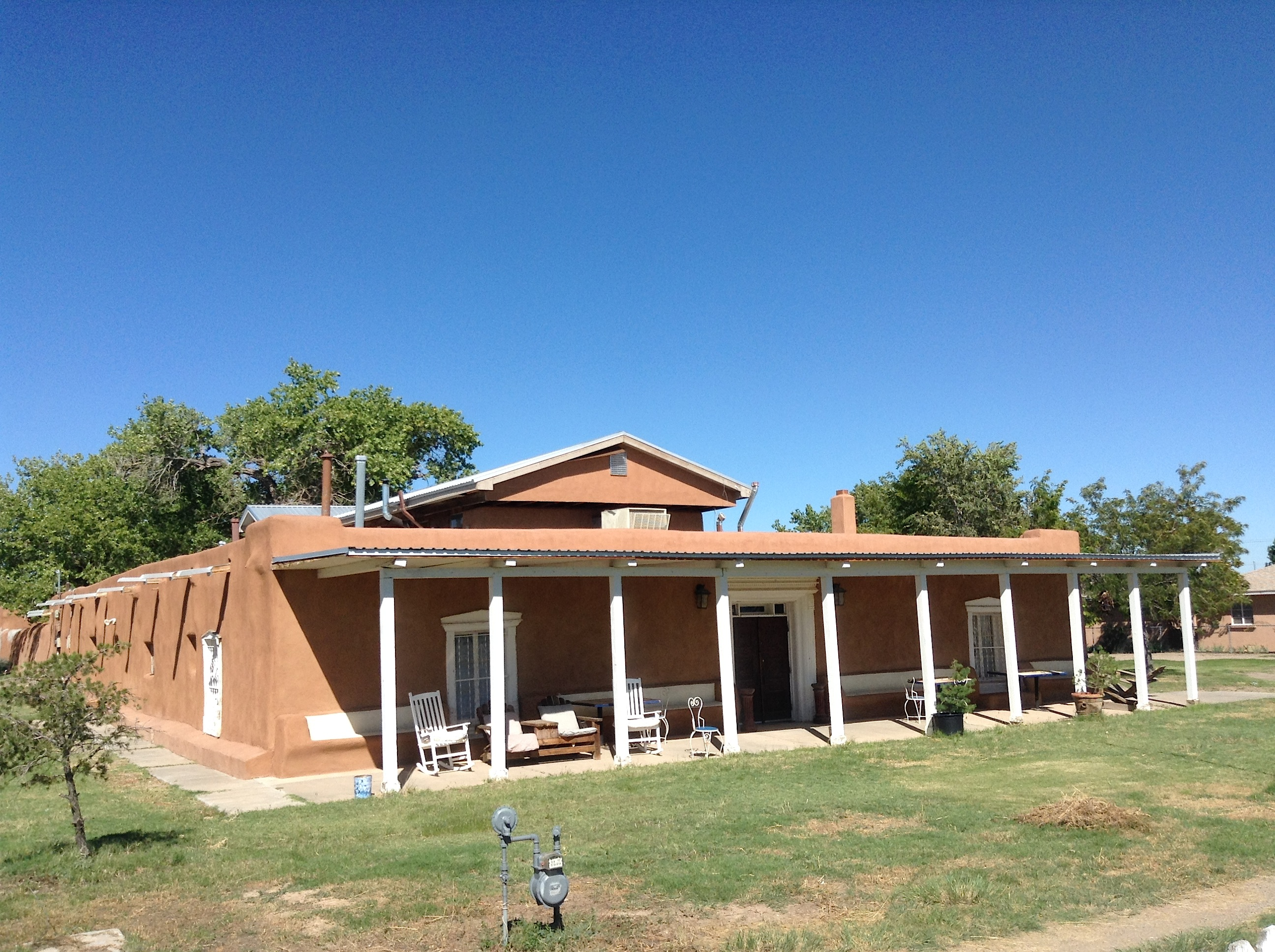

- Location within New Mexico Location within the United States
- Location: 325 Lala St., Belen, New Mexico
- Coordinates: 34°39′44″N 106°46′38″W
- Area: 1.2 acres (0.49 ha)
- Built: 1860
- Architectural style: Territorial Style
- NRHP reference No.: 80002575
- Added to NRHP: July 4, 1980

The Felipe Chaves House, at 325 Lala St. in Belen, New Mexico, was built around 1860. It was listed on the National Register of Historic Places in 1980. The listing included two contributing buildings.

It is a fine example of Territorial Style.
