= Adelino, New Mexico =

- Census-designated place
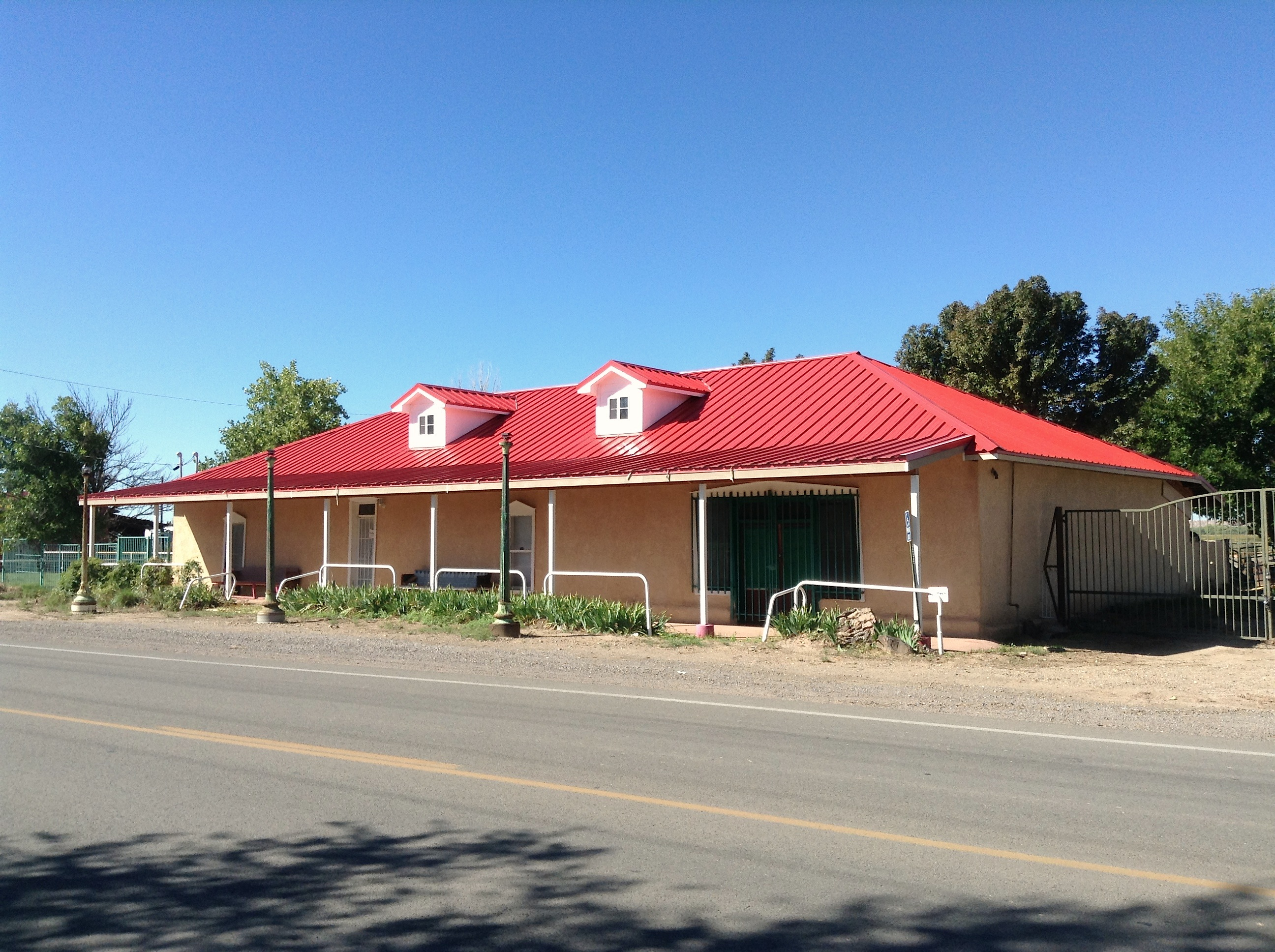
- The historic Miguel E. Baca House in Adelino

- Location within New Mexico
- Coordinates: 34°42′22″N 106°44′25″W
- Country: United States
- State: New Mexico
- County: Valencia

Area
  - Total: 2.98 sq mi (7.73 km^{2})
  - Land: 2.98 sq mi (7.73 km^{2})
  - Water: 0 sq mi (0.00 km^{2})
- Elevation: 4,820 ft (1,470 m)

Population (2020)
  - Total: 735
  - Density: 246/sq mi (95.1/km^{2})
- Time zone: UTC-7 (Mountain (MST))
  - Summer (DST): UTC-6 (MDT)
- Area code: 505
- GNIS feature ID: 2584044

Adelino is a census-designated place in Valencia County, New Mexico, United States. Its population was 783 as of the 2020 census. The Adelino CDP was first made in the 2010 census when it had a population of 823. Prior to 2010, the community was part of the Tome-Adelino CDP.

Adelino contains the historic Miguel E. Baca House, listed on the National Register of Historic Places.

== Demographics ==
Historical population
Census	Pop.	Note	%±
2020	735		—
U.S. Decennial Census

== Education ==
Its school district is Belén Consolidated Schools. Belén High School is the district's comprehensive high school.
