= Tome Jail =

- U.S. National Register of Historic Places
- NM State Register of Cultural Properties
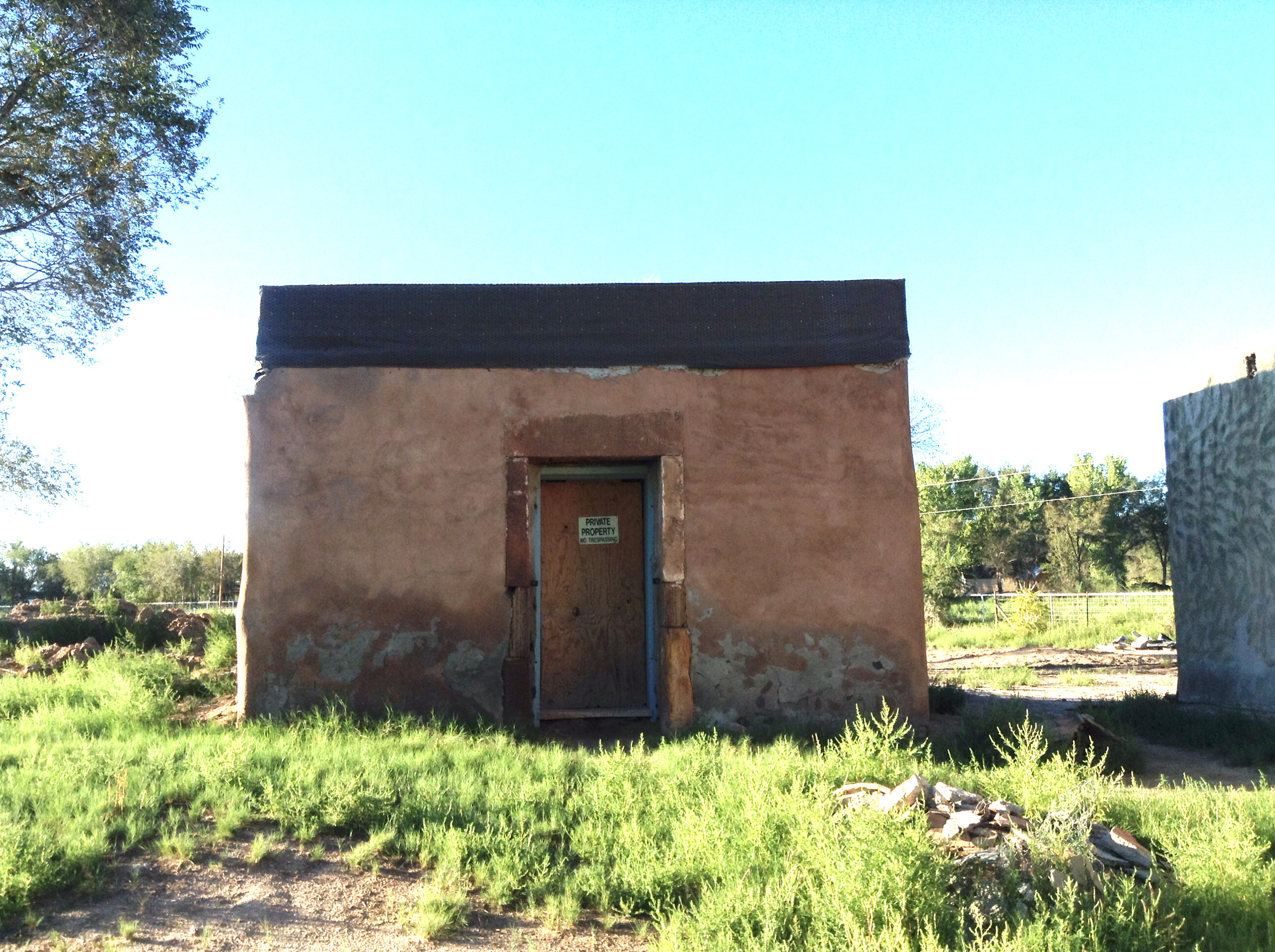
- Tome Jail in 2013

- Location within New Mexico Location within the United States
- Location: Tome Plaza; Tome, New Mexico
- Coordinates: 34°44′26″N 106°43′49″W
- Built: 1875
- NRHP reference No.: 77000932
- NMSRCP No.: 257

Significant dates
- Added to NRHP: October 5, 1977
- Designated NMSRCP: July 5, 1972

Tome Jail is a historic jail building in Tome, New Mexico. It is the only surviving part of the former Valencia County Courthouse, built when the county seat was moved from Belen to Tome in 1875. The courthouse was a two-story adobe building which gradually disappeared due to erosion, but the jail had more durable stone walls and remained standing. Construction of the building was probably authorized by Probate Judge Manuel A. Otero, who was the chief county official at the time and whose name appears in a bilingual inscription carved into the stone lintel.

The building is 15 feet (4.6 m) wide by 25 feet (7.6 m) deep, with plastered stone walls 4 feet (120 cm) thick. It has small windows on the south and west sides, each with a double set of bars set into a wooden frame on the inside and a sandstone frame on the outside. The interior walls and roof are of rough-cut lumber.
