= Tome, New Mexico =

- Census-designated place
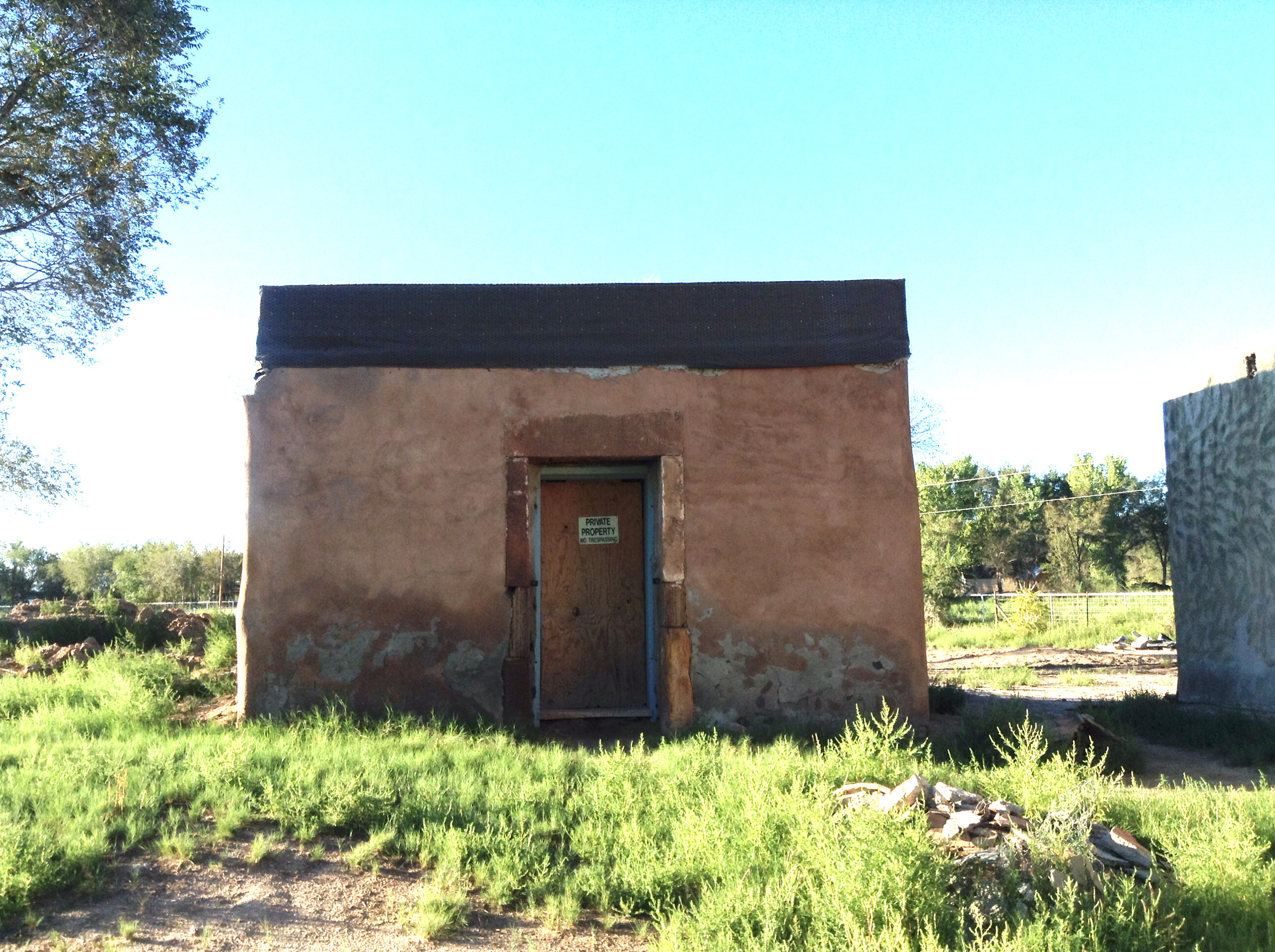
- Historic Tome Jail on the plaza

- Location within New Mexico
- Coordinates: 34°44′37″N 106°43′41″W
- Country: United States
- State: New Mexico
- County: Valencia

Area
  - Total: 5.53 sq mi (14.31 km^{2})
  - Land: 5.53 sq mi (14.31 km^{2})
  - Water: 0 sq mi (0.00 km^{2})
- Elevation: 4,830 ft (1,470 m)

Population (2020)
  - Total: 1,718
  - Density: 311.0/sq mi (120.08/km^{2})
- Time zone: UTC-7 (Mountain (MST))
  - Summer (DST): UTC-6 (MDT)
- ZIP code: 87060
- Area code: 505
- GNIS feature ID: 2633186

Tome (Spanish: Tomé) is an unincorporated village and census-designated place in Valencia County, New Mexico, United States. It is located in the Rio Grande valley near the foot of Tome Hill (El Cerro Tomé), a notable Catholic pilgrimage site. The village lies along New Mexico State Road 47 and is neighbored by Valencia to the north and Adelino to the south. It is the location of the Valencia Campus of the University of New Mexico. Tome has a post office with ZIP code 87060. As of the 2020 census, Tome had a population of 1,718.

The community was established when land abandoned by Tomé Domínguez de Mendoza following the Pueblo Revolt was granted to a new group of settlers in 1739. Once an important town on the Camino Real, it suffered due to Native American attacks and flooding during the 1800s. It was the seat of Valencia County from 1852 to 1872, and again briefly in 1875.

For census purposes, Tome was previously combined with Adelino in the Tome-Adelino census-designated place (CDP). The CDP was split prior to the 2010 Census.

== History ==
Tome was originally part of an encomienda granted to Tomé Domínguez de Mendoza in 1659. During the Pueblo Revolt of 1680, Domínguez fled to El Paso along with the other surviving Spanish settlers, but 38 members of his household were killed. Understandably, he was hesitant to return and remained in El Paso even after the Spanish reconquered New Mexico in 1692.

In 1739, a group of 29 settlers from Albuquerque petitioned to take over the abandoned land. Governor Gaspar Domingo de Mendoza granted the request and conveyed to them the Town of Tome Grant. Like other Spanish colonial towns, Tome had a central plaza surrounded by houses and a church. Although plagued by flooding and Native American attacks, it was a notable waypoint on the Camino Real and was frequently mentioned in travelers' accounts. In 1776, Fray Atanasio Domínguez reported that the town had 727 inhabitants, which made it about the same size as Albuquerque at the time.

In 1821, Mexico gained its independence from Spain. By this point Tome was sizable enough to have its own local government with an alcalde (mayor) and ayuntamiento (legislative council). During the Revolt of 1837, counter-revolutionaries led by Manuel Armijo met at Tome to formulate a plan for retaking Santa Fe. In 1852, now under the control of the United States, Tome was designated the county seat of Valencia County. An account of the town was given by U.S. Attorney William W.H. Davis in 1853 as he traveled the territorial District Court circuit:

Tomé, the county seat of Valencia county, is a village of not more than four hundred inhabitants... In former days it was one of the most prosperous towns in the Rio Abajo, and was the scene of annual festivals... In the course of time, the hostile Nabajos [sic] made descents upon the town, and carried many of the inhabitants into captivity. From this period we may date its decline. The people deserted their houses for a more secure home, the trade fell off, and the religious festivals were no longer celebrated there. The best buildings have tumbled down and gone to decay... Of late years the place is looking up a litle, but it is still dilapidated in appearance.

The county seat was moved to Belen from 1872–4, then back to Tome. In 1875, a new two-story adobe courthouse was built on the plaza with an adjacent stone jail building which is still standing. Despite this brand-new facility, the county seat was moved permanently to Los Lunas the following year. In 1968, the community was divided over whether to sell the land grant, still in force after almost 200 years, to a private developer. Ultimately the land was sold, but the grant was able to reacquire the spiritually significant El Cerro Tome Site in 2013.

== Demographics ==
Historical population
Census	Pop.	Note	%±
2020	1,718		—
U.S. Decennial Census

== Education ==
About half of Tome is in Belen Consolidated Schools and the other half is in Los Lunas Public Schools. Belén High School is the Belén district's comprehensive high school.

== Notable person ==
- Rosa Maria Calles, artist and playwright
