= McKinley County Courthouse =

- U.S. National Register of Historic Places
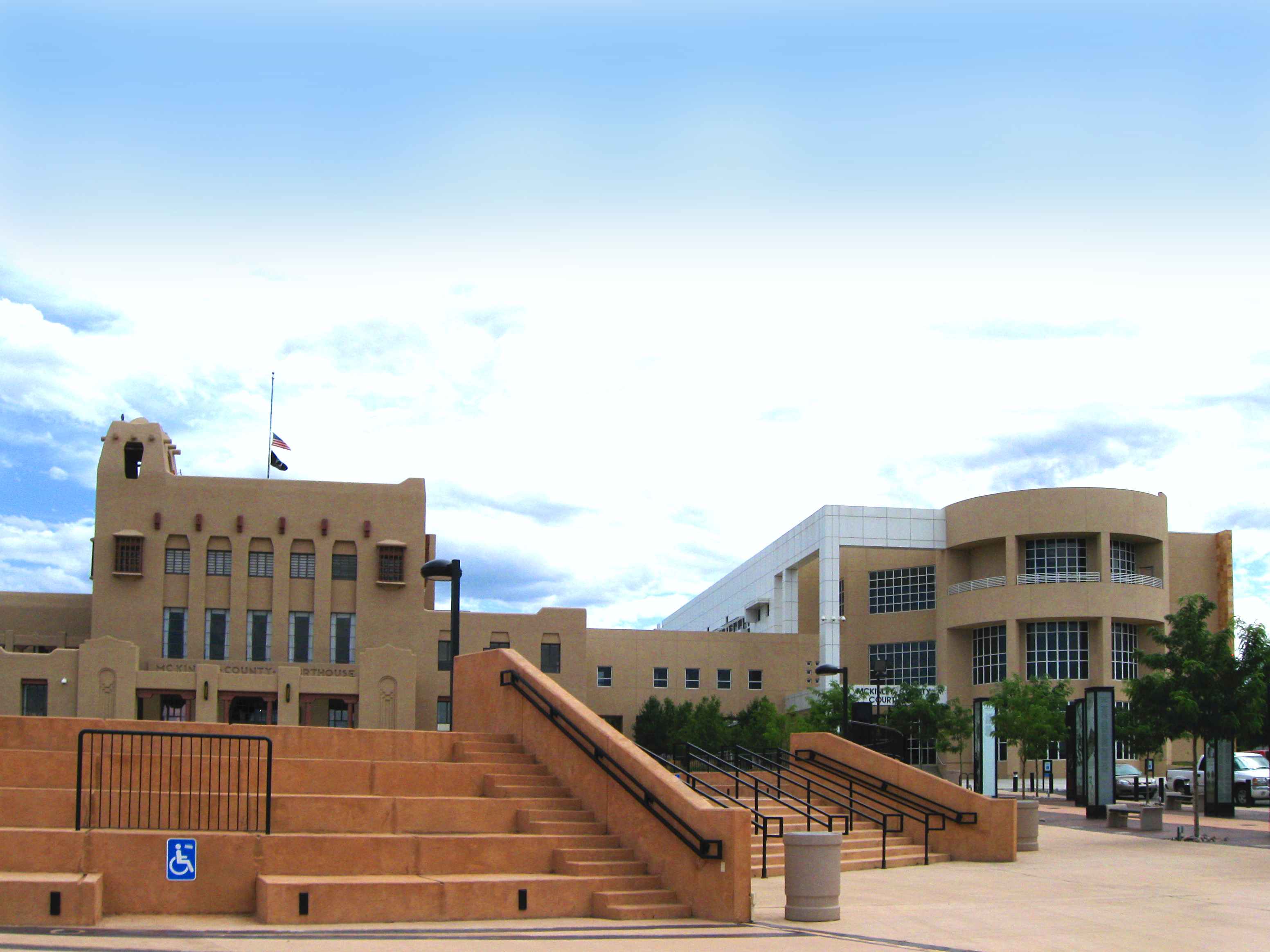

- Location within New Mexico
- Location: 205-209 W. Hill St., Gallup, New Mexico
- Coordinates: 35°31′29″N 108°44′30″W
- Area: 3 acres (1.2 ha)
- Built: 1938-39
- Built by: K.L. House
- Architect: Trost & Trost
- Architectural style: Mission/spanish Revival, Spanish-Pueblo Revival
- MPS: County Courthouses of New Mexico TR
- NRHP reference No.: 87000879
- Added to NRHP: February 15, 1989

The McKinley County Courthouse in Gallup, New Mexico, was built in 1938–39. It was listed on the National Register of Historic Places in 1989.

It was designed by El Paso, Texas, architects Trost & Trost. Its interior includes major works of WPA art.
