= New Mexico State Road 6 =

State highway in New Mexico, United States

State Road 6
- NM 6 highlighted in red

Route information
- Maintained by NMDOT
- Length: 36.360 mi (58.516 km)

Major junctions
- West end: I-40 on the Laguna Indian Reservation
- I-25 / US 85 in Los Lunas NM 314 in Los Lunas NM 263 in Valencia
- East end: NM 47 in Valencia

Location
- Country: United States
- State: New Mexico
- Counties: Cibola, Valencia

Highway system
- New Mexico State Highway System; Interstate; US; State; Scenic
← NM 5	→ NM 7

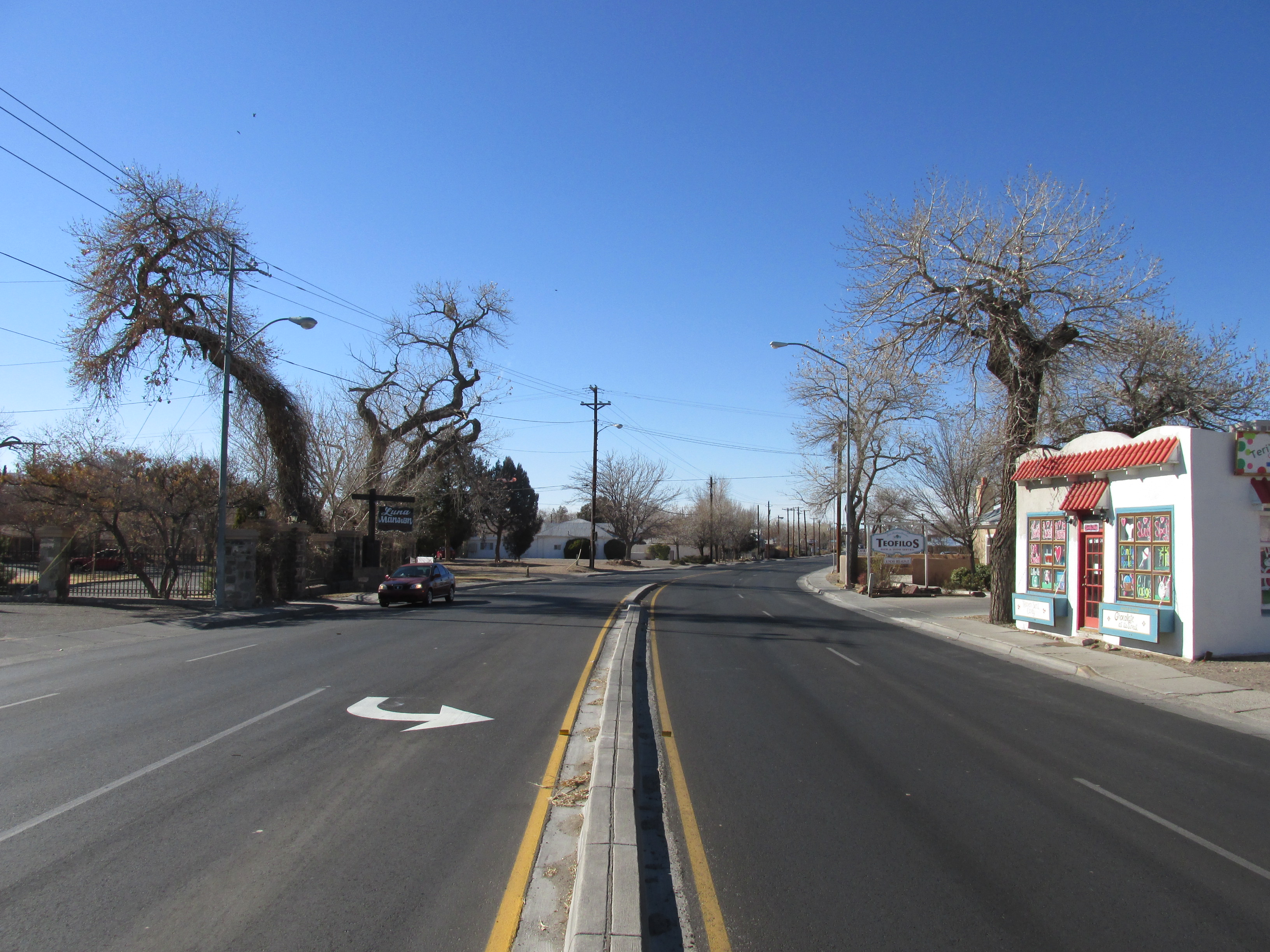
NM 6 westbound in Los Lunas.

New Mexico State Road 6 (NM 6) is an east–west state highway in the state of New Mexico. NM 6's western terminus is at Interstate 40 (I-40) west of Albuquerque, and the eastern terminus is at NM 47 in Los Lunas.

== Route description ==
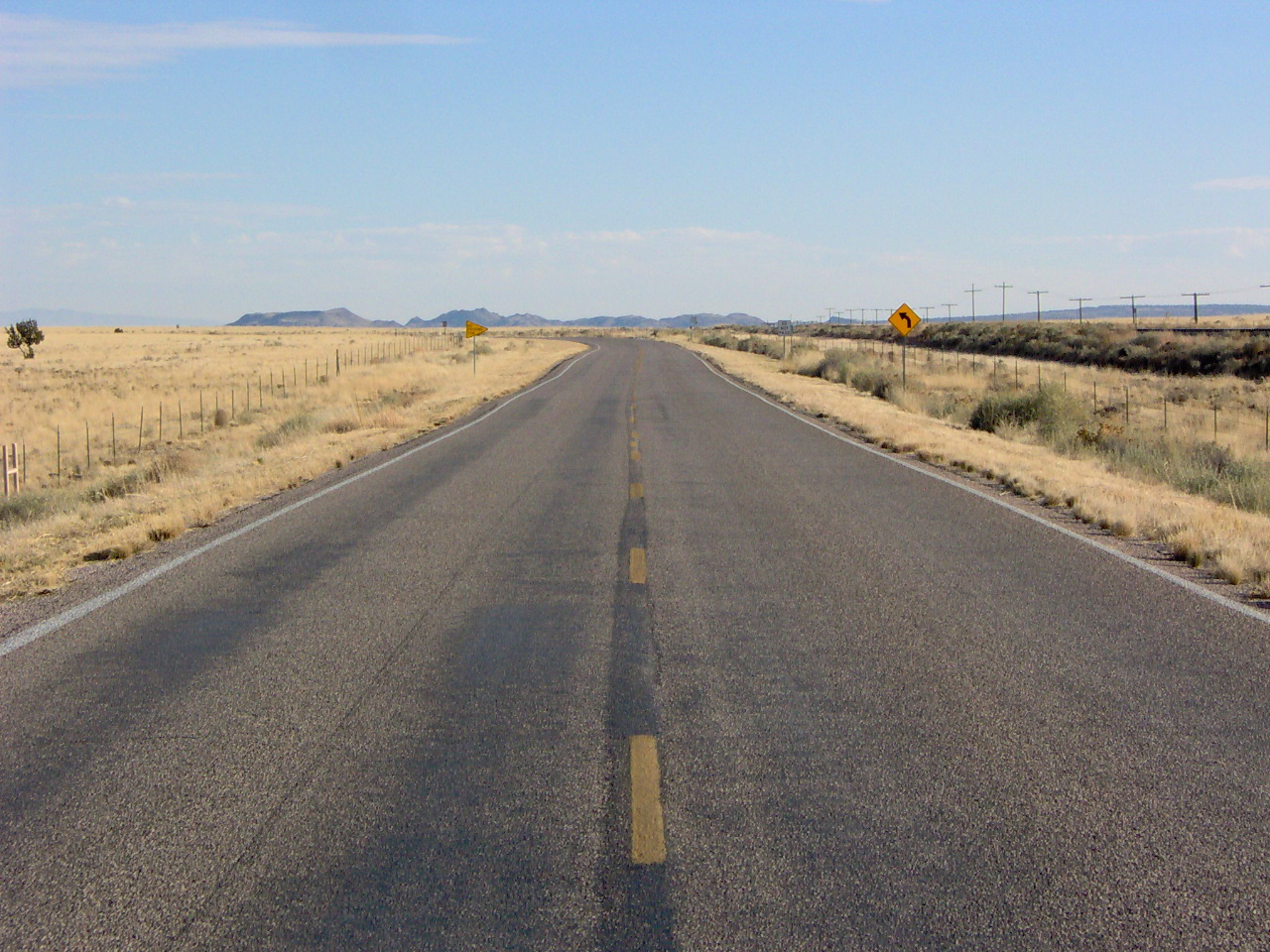
NM 6 by Rio Puerco

NM 6 begins at an intersection with Interstate 40 (I-40) about 30 miles (48 km) west of Albuquerque. The road travels to the southeast and then to the east. It has an interchange with I-25 in Los Lunas. The road passes through the village of Los Lunas as Main Street, crossing the Rio Grande before its eastern terminus at NM 47. Some maps show NM 6 continuing south concurrently with NM 47 through Belen and onward to U.S. Route 60 (US 60). This alignment is not reflected in the state highway log.

== History ==
Much of NM 6 follows the historic alignment of US 66 and is signed as such.

== Major intersections ==
County	Location	mi	km	Destinations	Notes
Cibola	Laguna Indian Reservation	0.000	0.000	I-40 – Albuquerque, Flagstaff, Arizona	Western terminus; exit 126 (I-40)
Valencia	Los Lunas	32.621	52.498	I-25 / US 85 – Las Cruces, Albuquerque	Exit 203 (I-25)
Valencia	Los Lunas	34.364	55.303	NM 314 – Belen, Isleta Pueblo	
Valencia	Valencia	35.890	57.759	NM 263 south (El Cerro Road) – Belen	Northern terminus of NM 263
Valencia	Valencia	36.360	58.516	NM 47 – Belen, Isleta Pueblo	Eastern terminus
1.000 mi = 1.609 km; 1.000 km = 0.621 mi
