= Ladd S. Gordon Waterfowl Complex =

Group of conservation areas

- Interactive map of Ladd S. Gordon Waterfowl Complex
- Nearest town: Bernardo, New Mexico
- Coordinates: 34.353463°N 106.869167°W
- Established: 1957
- Governing body: New Mexico Department of Game & Fish

The Ladd S. Gordon Waterfowl Complex is a group of four conservation areas in New Mexico devoted to assisting birdlife in the region.

== Management areas ==
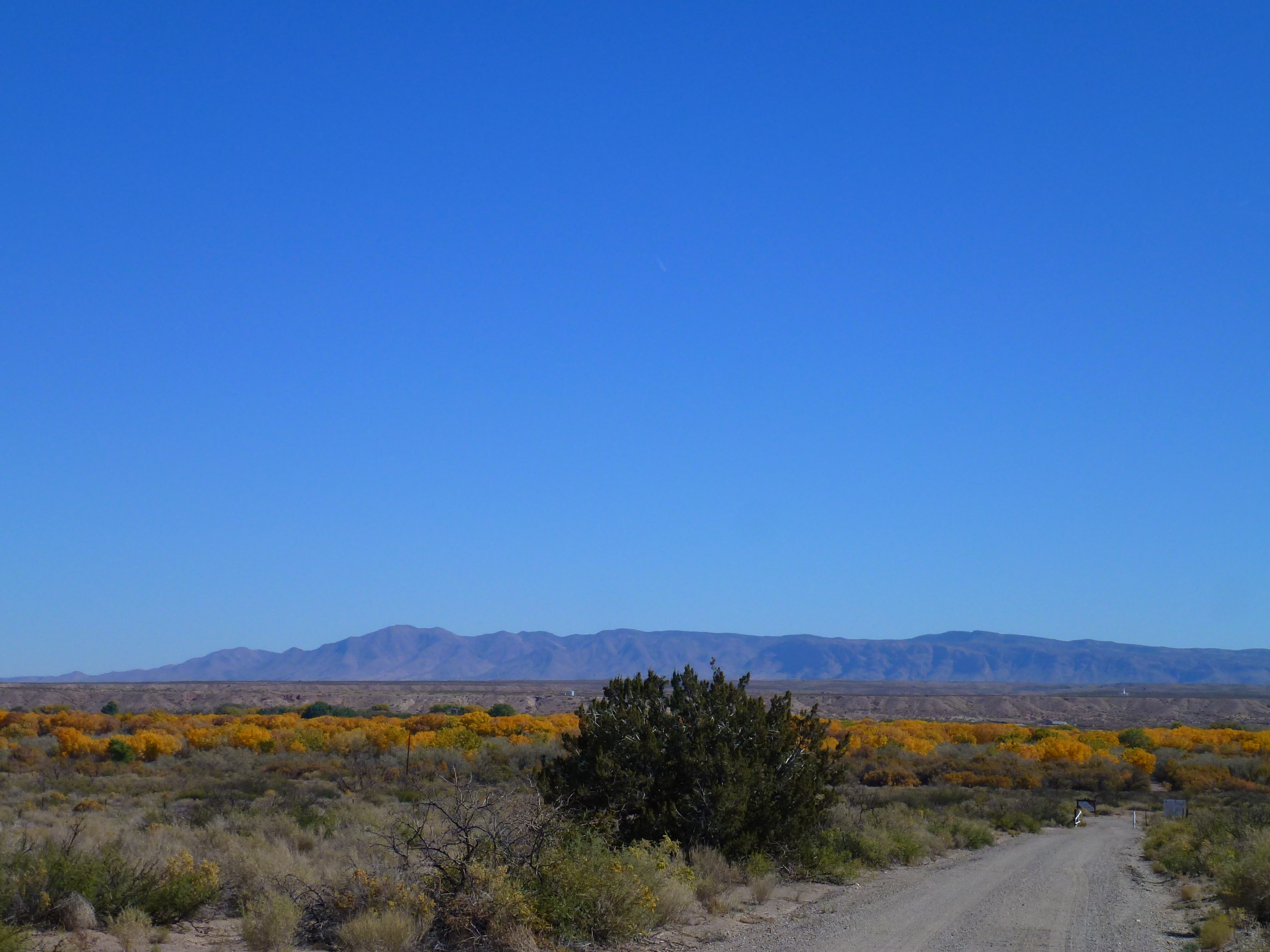
La Joya Wildlife Management Unit

The Ladd S. Gordon Waterfowl Complex contains four wildlife management areas in Valencia and Socorro County, New Mexico, near Bernardo. The largest is La Joya and the second largest is the Bernardo Waterfowl Area (BWA). There are smaller Waterfowl Management Areas (WMAs) at Casa Colorada, (420 acres (170 ha)), and Belen with 230 acres (93 ha), at both of which corn and alfalfa are cultivated to provide food for the birds. The WMAs are supported by sale of hunting and fishing licenses. Along with the Bosque del Apache National Wildlife Refuge to the south, they feed half of the waterbirds that winter in the Middle Rio Grande Basin.

=== La Joya Unit ===
The La Joya Unit, established in 1957, is located at exit 169 on Interstate 25, to the east of the freeway. It covers 3,500 acres (1,400 ha) with many ponds that harbor waterfowl, shorebirds and species from the nearby desert. La Joya contains 600 acres (240 ha) of man-made ponds. As of 2008 La Joya was open for hunting between September and mid-January.

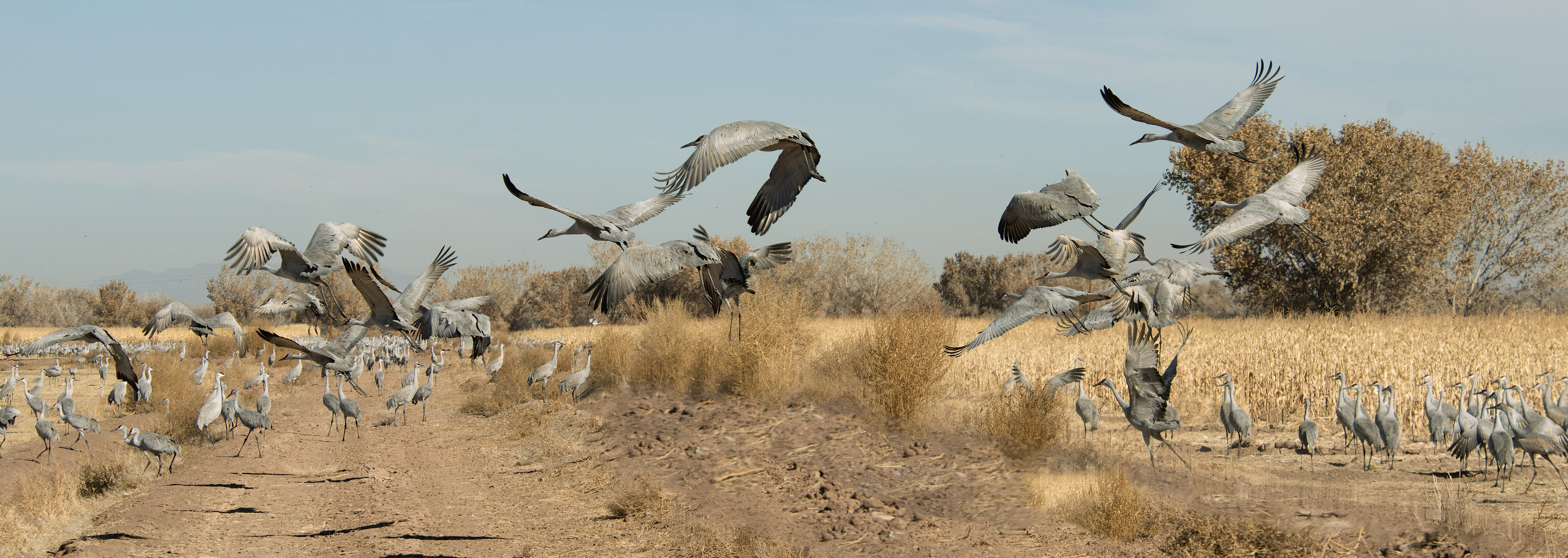
Sandhill Cranes at Bernardo Wildlife Management Area.

=== Bernardo Unit ===
The Bernardo Unit covers 1,700 acres (690 ha), and is designed to provide a winter habitat for waterfowl and sandhill cranes. It is located to the east of I-25 on U.S. 60. Each year corn, alfalfa, winter wheat and milo are grown on about 450 acres (180 ha) to provide food, and in the fall several fields are flooded to provide resting areas. The unit has a 3 miles (4.8 km) tour loop, with three elevated observation platforms. More than 25,000 snow geese and 12,000 sandhill cranes winter in the Middle Rio Grande, and Bernardo is an important resting and feeding point. Other wildlife include mule deer, coyotes, raccoons, pheasants, hawks, owls, quail, songbirds, different species of duck and occasional bald eagles.

== Ladd S. Gordon ==
Ladd S. Gordon was a graduate of the University of New Mexico who began working with the Department of Game and Fish as a biologist and conservation officer, and became Director from 1963 until 1975. Gordon, who died in 1991, was known for a pragmatic approach to combining theory with practical experience in game management, and for allowing new approaches but monitoring them carefully to find ways to adapt, improve or eliminate them. He initiated a policy of holding public hearings on game management issues, and was successful in ensuring that legislature favorable to his department got passed. After his death, the department established the Ladd S. Gordon Memorial Scholarship for graduate students in his honor.

The Tucumcari State Wildlife Area, home of Tucumcari Lake, was formerly known as the Ladd S. Gordon State Wildlife Area. It is to the east of Tucumcari and is frequented by wintering ducks from mid-October, and by geese from mid-November.
