= New Mexico Department of Game and Fish =

Agency overview
- Formed: 1903
- Agency executive: Mike Sloane, Director
- Website: wildlife.dgf.nm.gov

The New Mexico Department of Game and Fish (NMDGF) is a state-level government department within the New Mexico Governor's Cabinet that is responsible for maintaining wildlife and fish in the state. The NMDGF undertakes protection, conservation and propagation, and regulates the use of game and fish to ensure there is an adequate supply for recreation and food.

== History ==
The New Mexico Territorial Legislature created a predecessor to the game department in 1903. Upon New Mexico's statehood in 1912, the newly formed New Mexico Legislature formally created the Department of Game and Fish, and in 1921, the Legislature created a three-member commission to manage the department. In 2025, a bill set in motion various changes including changing the name to Department of Wildlife in 2026.

== Organization ==
A seven-member body appointed by the governor, the State Game Commission authorizes regulations and the department implements and enforces them. Not more than four members can be from the same political party. Five of the members represent different geographical areas of the state. The other two members are appointed “at large.” At least one member of the commission shall represent agricultural interests. One member represents conservation interests. The commission hires the director of the Department of Game and Fish and also has the power to fire the director. The NMDGF applies regulations on all land in New Mexico, whether federal, state or privately owned, other than Indian land. On many Pueblo lands and reservations, Game and Fish staff work with the people responsible for wildlife management.

Fishing and hunting license fees and taxes on fishing and hunting goods such as rod, reels and rifles provide a large part of the department's funding. However, major capital programs may be funded by the legislature. Starting in 1991, Game and Fish started to implement the Sikes Act, under which anglers who use public land that is managed by the United States Forest Service or the Bureau of Land Management must buy a Habitat Improvement Validation. Funds from this sources are used, as the name implies, to fund habitat improvements.

In 2011, a bill was being considered for eliminating the State Game Commission and merging the New Mexico Department of Game and Fish into the New Mexico Energy, Minerals and Natural Resources Department.

== Hunting ==
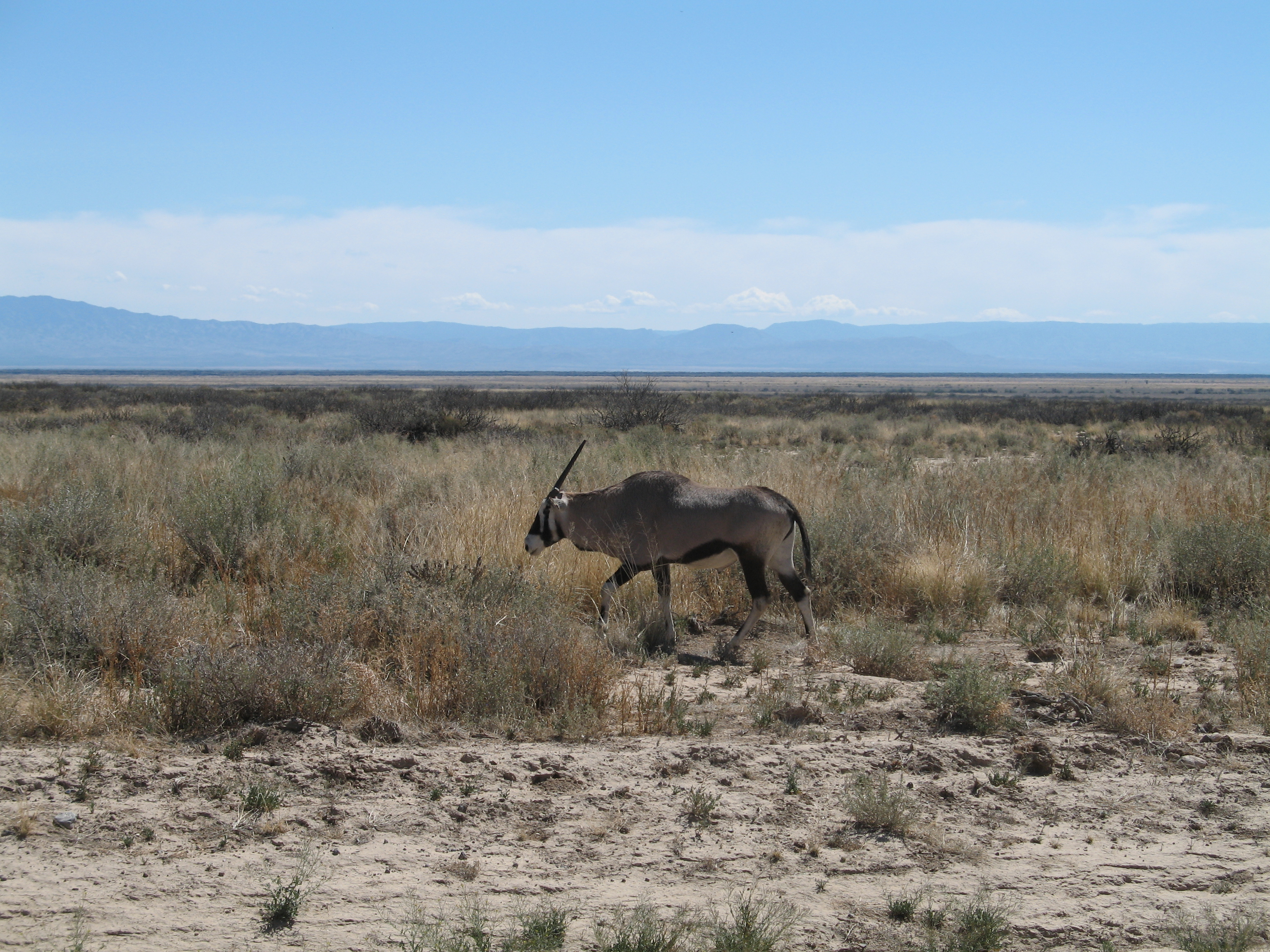
Gemsbok in the White Sands Missile Range in New Mexico

At the suggestion of big-game hunter Frank C. Hibben, between 1969 and 1977 the Department of Game and Fish introduced 93 captive bred Oryx into the White Sands Missile Range, intending them to be hunted for sport. It was assumed that they would remain in the Tularosa Basin and that mountain lions would control their numbers. These assumptions were incorrect. The oryx found the environment ideal and rapidly increased in numbers, as of 2012 reaching between 3,000 and 6,000 animals, and spread into the White Sands National Monument and private lands where public hunting is not allowed. Despite several hundred being taken every year, numbers continue to expand. As of 2001, oryx had been spotted as far apart as sixty miles south of Albuquerque, and West Texas. The department has undertaken an expensive program to fence the White Sands National Monument and then remove all the oryx from the park.

In 1977, Game and Fish began arresting non-Indian hunters for illegal possession of game that was taken from the Mescalero reservation in accordance with tribal laws, since this was not in compliance with state law. The tribe filed suit, and the case went to the Supreme Court, which ruled unanimously in favor of the Mescaleros. Reasons included the argument that giving Game and Fish authority would "nullify the Tribe's unquestioned authority to regulate the use of its resources by members and nonmembers".

== Fishing ==
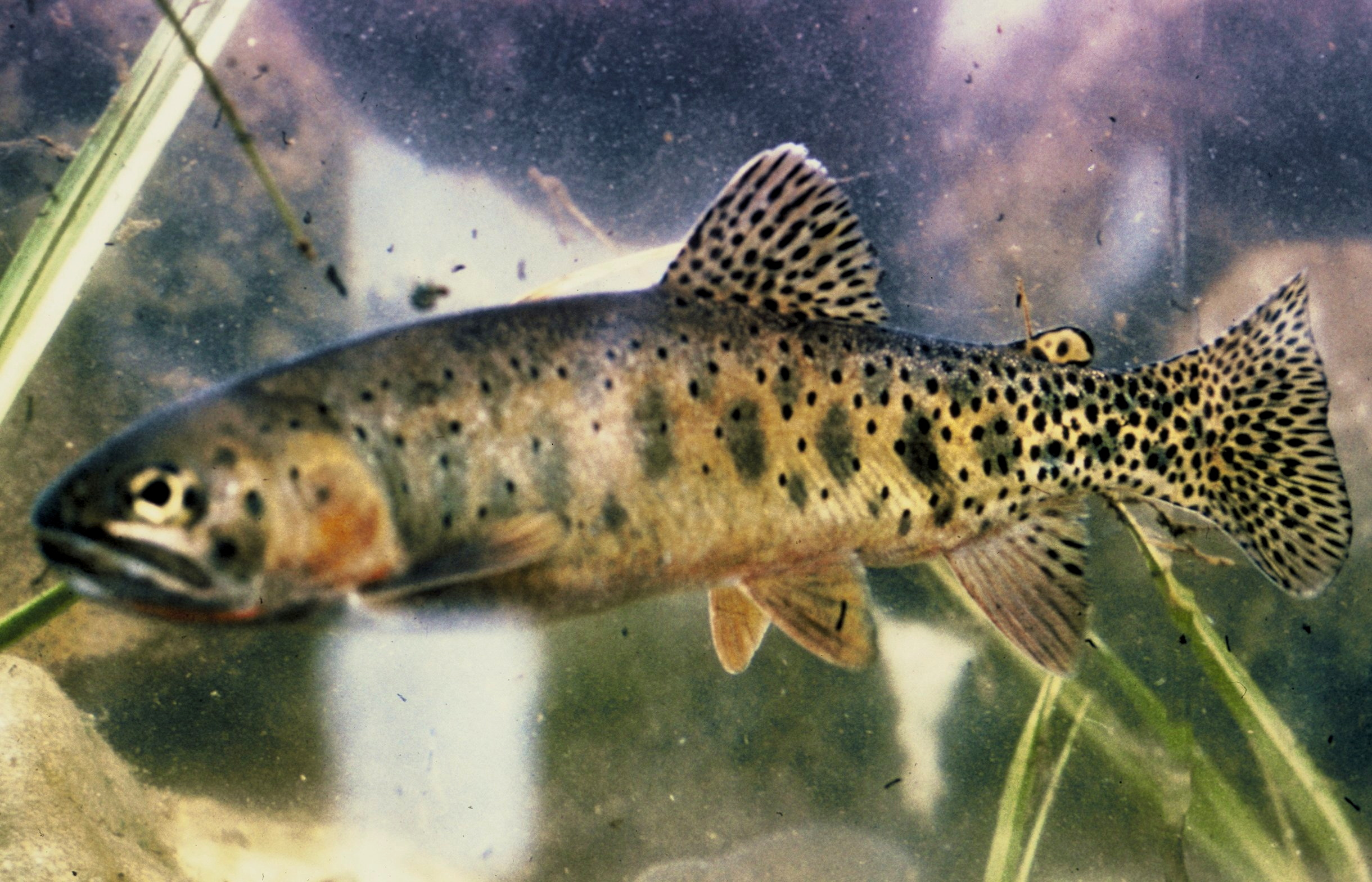
Rio Grande cutthroat trout, a species endemic to the Albuquerque Basin that may be under threat

In 1955 the Department of Game and Fish created Clayton Lake in Clayton Lake State Park as a fishing lake and winter waterfowl resting area. The department assists in managing Fenton Lake State Park and Eagle Nest Lake State Park. The Carson National Forest is operated by the United States Department of Agriculture - Forestry Service. The Department of Game and Fish Department works with the forest personnel to maintain the wildlife habitat and to stock the many lakes and the four hundred miles of mountain streams with native trout.

As of 1989, the Fish Management Division operated six hatcheries: Glenwood Hatchery, Lisboa Springs Hatchery, Parkview Hatchery, Red River Hatchery, Seven Springs Hatchery and Rock Lake Hatchery. The last hatches walleye while the others hatch trout or kokanee. The discovery of whirling disease, Myxobolus cerebralis, in the early 1990s had a devastating effect, since some fish from five of the six hatcheries tested positive, and Game and Fish decided they should not stock any fish from hatcheries with known diseases. The hatcheries were rebuilt with the most recent one being Los Ojos Fish Hatchery and it being finished in 2009 after a whirling disease outbreak in 2004.

== Other activities ==
The Department of Game and Fish operates the Ladd S. Gordon Waterfowl Complex, a group of four conservation area in New Mexico devoted to assisting birdlife in the region with Waterfowl Management Areas at La Joya, Bernardo, Casa Colorada, and Belen.

Game and Fish has developed the Biota Information System of New Mexico (BISON-M) in collaboration with other agencies, which holds information on all vertebrate and many invertebrate species of wildlife found in New Mexico and Arizona, including all threatened, endangered and sensitive species.

== See also ==
- List of law enforcement agencies in New Mexico
- List of state and territorial fish and wildlife management agencies in the United States
