= Allsup =

Allsup may refer to:

== Businesses ==
- Allsup's, an American convenience store chain
- Allsup LLC, a National Social Security Disability Representative

== People with the surname ==
- James Allsup (born 1995), American antisemitic white supremacist
- Lynne Allsup (1949–2023), American former swimmer, 1964 Olympic participant
- Michael Allsup (born 1947), American guitarist
- Tommy Allsup (1931–2017), American rockabilly musician

== Places ==
- Mount Allsup, a mountain in Antarctica
