= Madrone, New Mexico =

- census-designated place
- Location within New Mexico
- Coordinates: 34°34′55″N 106°44′20″W
- Country: United States
- State: New Mexico
- County: Valencia

Area
  - Total: 3.08 sq mi (7.97 km^{2})
  - Land: 3.08 sq mi (7.97 km^{2})
  - Water: 0 sq mi (0.00 km^{2})
- Elevation: 4,905 ft (1,495 m)

Population (2020)
  - Total: 621
  - Density: 201.8/sq mi (77.91/km^{2})
- Time zone: UTC-7 (Mountain (MST))
  - Summer (DST): UTC-6 (MDT)
- Area code: 505
- GNIS feature ID: 2584151

Madrone is a census-designated place in Valencia County, New Mexico, United States. As of the 2020 census, Madrone had a population of 621. New Mexico State Road 304 passes through the community.

== Geography ==
According to the U.S. Census Bureau, the community has an area of 3.080 square miles (7.98 km^{2}), all land.

== Demographics ==
Historical population
Census	Pop.	Note	%±
2020	621		—
U.S. Decennial Census

== Education ==
Its school district is Belén Consolidated Schools. Belén High School is the district's comprehensive high school.
