= Belén High School =

Coordinates: 34°39′39″N 106°47′31″W

Belen High School

Location
- 1619 W Delgado Ave; Belen, NM 87002; United States

Information
- School type: Public, High School
- Motto: "Loyal and True"
- Established: 1916
- Locale: Valencia County
- School district: Belén Consolidated Schools
- NCES School ID: 350018000140
- Principal: Sonia Lawson
- Faculty: 68
- Teaching staff: 49.50 (FTE)
- Grades: 9–12
- Enrollment: 1,044 (2023–2024)
- Student to teacher ratio: 21.09
- Campus: 30-acre (0.12 km^{2}) Rural Fringe
- Colors: Maroon, white, and gold
- Athletics: Dance, cross country, football, volleyball, basketball, wrestling, track and field, baseball, softball, golf, swimming, and tennis
- Athletics conference: NMAA District 6-AAAAA
- Mascot: Eagles
- Website: www.beleneagles.org/o/bhs

Belén High School (BHS) is a public high school located in Belen, Valencia County, New Mexico. Part of Belén Consolidated Schools, it was established in 1916 as the first public high school in Valencia County.

== Attendance zone ==
Within Valencia County, in addition to the vast majority of Belen, the district (and therefore the school's attendance boundary) includes the municipality of Rio Communities and the census-designated places of Adelino, Casa Colorada, Jarales, Madrone, Pueblitos, and Sausal. It also includes about half of Tome, and portions of Las Maravillas and Los Chavez. The district also includes a section of Socorro County, where it includes Abeytas, La Joya, Las Nutrias, and Veguita.

== Athletics ==
Until 2014, all of Belen's varsity sports teams competed in Class 4A of the NMAA's District 6. Since 2015, Belen has competed in Class 5A due to a shift in student enrollment.

- Fall - Cheerleading, Boys and Girls Cross Country, Football, Boys and Girls Soccer, Boys and Girls Volleyball
- Winter - Boys and Girls Basketball, Cheerleading, Boys and Girls Swimming and Diving, Wrestling
- Spring - Cheerleading, Baseball, Boys and Girls Golf, Boys and Girls Outdoor Track and Field, Softball, and Boys and Girls Tennis

=== Basketball ===
In spring 2009, the boys and girls basketball teams both reached District 6-4A championship games and played state tournament games at the historic Pit. The basketball team won its first district title since 1995, and the girls golf team had two players among the top five individuals and was fifth as a team at the state championships. The Belen boys basketball team won the 2017 NMAA Class 5A State Championship against Española Valley High School.

=== Cross Country ===
In November 2007, a girls cross country team composed of only underclassmen won the Class 4A state team title, which was Belen's first cross country team championship. From 2011 to 2014, the boys cross country team won four consecutive district championships. At the state level, Belen boys took 3rd place in the Class 4A state championship in both 2003 and 2012.

In fall 2009, the boys and girls cross country teams both won District 6-4A team titles, with the boys fourth at state and the girls winning the third-place state trophy in Class 4A.

=== Football ===
In fall 2008, the Belen eagle football team finished the season 10-2, won the District 6-4A championship, beat rival Los Lunas for the first time since 1997, and its only losses were to the state finalist Aztec.

=== Soccer ===
The boys soccer team won 15 matches and went 1-1 in the state tournament, losing 3-2 to the eventual champion Farmington in the state quarter finals. The Belen football team ended 12-1, losing 28-21 to Goddard in the first high school state championship game played within Valencia County in that sport.

=== Softball ===
In spring 2008, the softball team won only its second district title in 13 seasons, going 13-2 in District 5-4A games. The baseball team was second in 5-4A and reached the Class 4A state quarterfinals. Both the baseball and softball teams also won two state tournament games.

=== Track and Field ===
The boys medley relay team won first place at the 2008 Class 4A track and field championships. In the same year, athlete Aleona Reyes won first place in the 800 metres with a time of 2:19.86.

=== Wrestling ===
From 2003 to 2008, the wrestling team won six straight Class 4A state championships. After being reclassified to Class 5A in 2015, the team went on to win additional state championships in 2016 and 2017.

== Academic competitions ==
The school has had some success in academic competitions at both the state and national levels (see United States Academic Decathlon). It was third at the New Mexico regional competition and won medals in mathematics, economics, essay, interview, music and language/literature, as well as the gold medal in Super Quiz. The Academic Decathlon team will compete at the state competition in hopes of going to nationals for the first time in six years.

== Alumni ==
Notable alumni include:

- Gloria Castillo, stage and motion picture actress
- Mike Nesbitt, former punter for the New Orleans Saints and Minnesota Vikings
- Michael S. Sanchez, member of the New Mexico Senate from 1993 to 2016
- Gregory Baca, member of the New Mexico Senate since January 2017
- Antoinette Sedillo Lopez, member of the New Mexico Senate since January 2019
- Joshua A. Sanchez, member of the New Mexico Senate since January 2021
- Mirage Amuro, drag performer
