= Las Nutrias, New Mexico =

- Unincorporated community
- Location within New Mexico
- Coordinates: 34°28′11″N 106°46′15″W
- Country: United States
- State: New Mexico
- County: Socorro

Area
  - Total: 0.97 sq mi (2.50 km^{2})
  - Land: 0.97 sq mi (2.50 km^{2})
  - Water: 0 sq mi (0.00 km^{2})
- Elevation: 4,767 ft (1,453 m)

Population (2020)
  - Total: 119
  - Density: 123.2/sq mi (47.57/km^{2})
- Time zone: UTC-7 (Mountain (MST))
  - Summer (DST): UTC-6 (MDT)
- Area code: 575
- GNIS feature ID: 2584134

Las Nutrias is an unincorporated community and census-designated place in Socorro County, New Mexico, United States. As of the 2020 census, Las Nutrias had a population of 119. New Mexico State Road 304 passes through the community.

== Geography ==
According to the U.S. Census Bureau, the community has an area of 0.966 square miles (2.50 km^{2}), all land.

== Demographics ==
Historical population
Census	Pop.	Note	%±
2020	119		—
U.S. Decennial Census

== Education ==
Its school district is Belén Consolidated Schools. Belén High School is the district's comprehensive high school.

== Gallery ==
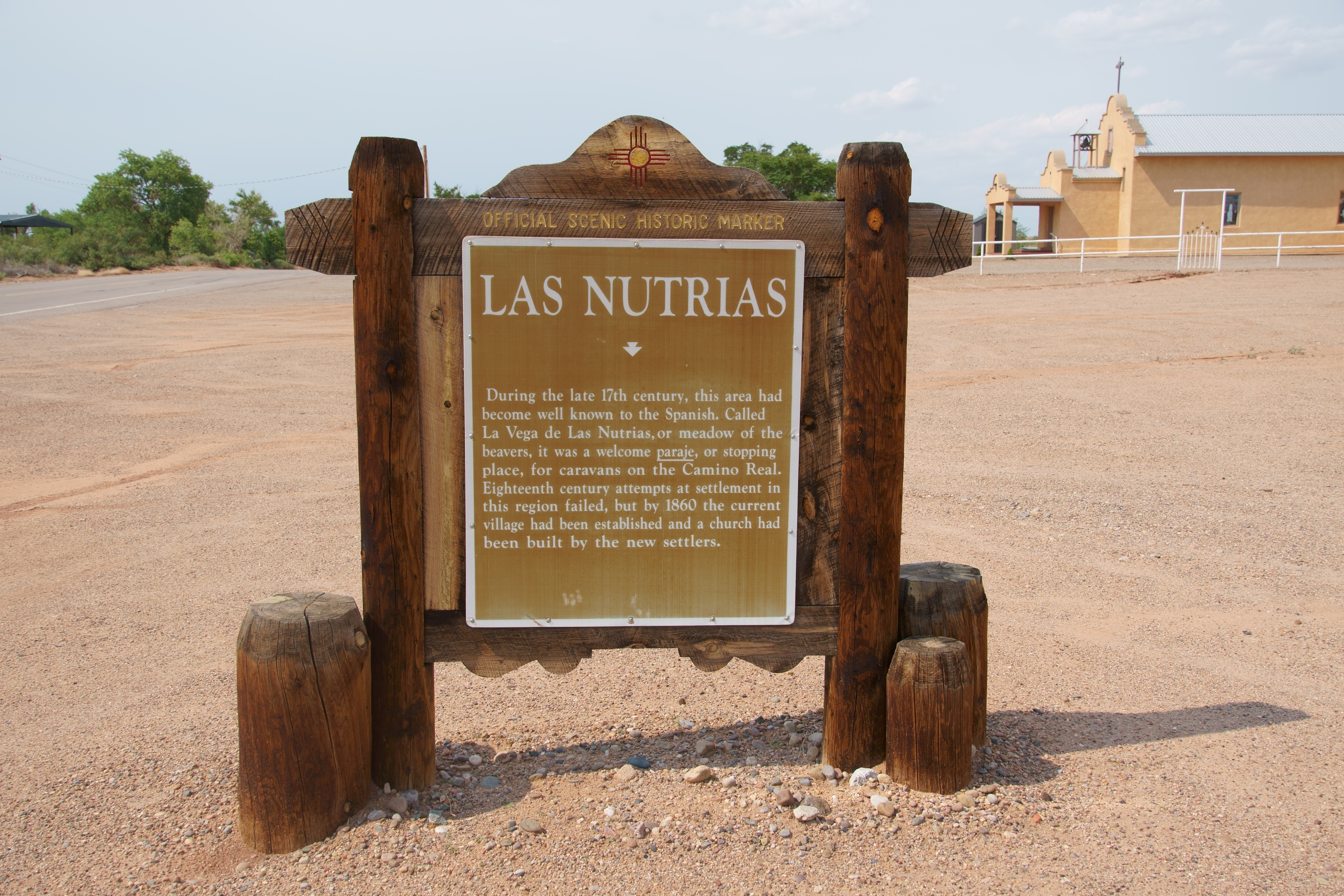
Official Scenic Historic Marker
