= New Mexico State Road 109 =

State highway in New Mexico, United States

State Road 109
- Jarales Rd

Route information
- Maintained by NMDOT
- Length: 7.757 mi (12.484 km)

Major junctions
- South end: NM 346 near Bosque
- North end: NM 309 near Belen

Location
- Country: United States
- State: New Mexico
- Counties: Valencia

Highway system
- New Mexico State Highway System; Interstate; US; State; Scenic
← NM 108	→ NM 110

State Road 109 (NM 109), also known as Jarales Rd, is a state highway in the US state of New Mexico. Its total length is approximately 7.75 miles (12.47 km). NM 109's southern terminus is at NM 346 southeast of Bosque, and the northern terminus is at NM 309 near Belen.

== Future ==
The at grade crossing with the BNSF railway is to be converted to a grade separated crossing. Construction is expected to begin in December 2021.

== Major intersections ==
The entire route is in Valencia County.

Location	mi	km	Destinations	Notes
Bosque	0.000	0.000	NM 346	Southern terminus
Belen	7.757	12.484	NM 309	Northern terminus
1.000 mi = 1.609 km; 1.000 km = 0.621 mi
