= Pueblitos, New Mexico =

- census-designated place
- Location within New Mexico
- Coordinates: 34°37′23″N 106°46′45″W
- Country: United States
- State: New Mexico
- County: Valencia

Area
  - Total: 2.13 sq mi (5.52 km^{2})
  - Land: 2.13 sq mi (5.51 km^{2})
  - Water: 0.0039 sq mi (0.01 km^{2})
- Elevation: 4,800 ft (1,500 m)

Population (2020)
  - Total: 540
  - Density: 253.9/sq mi (98.04/km^{2})
- Time zone: UTC-7 (Mountain (MST))
  - Summer (DST): UTC-6 (MDT)
- Area code: 505
- GNIS feature ID: 2584186

Pueblitos is a census-designated place in Valencia County, New Mexico, United States. As of the 2020 census, Pueblitos had a population of 540. New Mexico State Road 116 passes through the community.

== Geography ==
According to the U.S. Census Bureau, the community has an area of 2.140 square miles (5.54 km^{2}); 2.138 square miles (5.54 km^{2}) is land, and 0.002 square miles (0.0052 km^{2}) is water.

== Demographics ==
Historical population
Census	Pop.	Note	%±
2020	540		—
U.S. Decennial Census

== Education ==
Its school district is Belén Consolidated Schools. Belén High School is the district's comprehensive high school.
