= New Mexico State Road 346 =

State highway in New Mexico, United States

State Road 346

Route information
- Maintained by NMDOT
- Length: 2.710 mi (4.361 km)

Major junctions
- West end: NM 116 in Bosque
- East end: NM 304 near Veguita

Location
- Country: United States
- State: New Mexico
- Counties: Valencia

Highway system
- New Mexico State Highway System; Interstate; US; State; Scenic
← NM 345	→ NM 347

State Road 346 (NM 346) is a 2.7-mile-long (4.3 km) state highway in the US state of New Mexico. NM 519's western terminus is at NM 116 in Bosque, and the eastern terminus is at NM 304 north of Veguita.

== Major intersections ==
The entire route is in Valencia County.

Location	mi	km	Destinations	Notes
Bosque	0.000	0.000	NM 116	Western terminus
	0.833	1.341	NM 109 north	Southern terminus of NM 109
	2.710	4.361	NM 304	Eastern terminus
1.000 mi = 1.609 km; 1.000 km = 0.621 mi
