= Belén Consolidated Schools =

School district in New Mexico, United States

Belén Consolidated Schools is a school district headquartered in Belen, New Mexico, US.

Within Valencia County, in addition to the vast majority of Belen, the district includes the municipality of Rio Communities and the census-designated places of Adelino, Casa Colorada, Jarales, Madrone, Pueblitos, and Sausal. It also includes about half of Tome, and portions of Las Maravillas and Los Chavez. The district also includes a section of Socorro County, where it includes Abeytas, La Joya, Las Nutrias, and Veguita.

== History ==
By 2022 the district joined a co-op with other districts to make purchasing of supplies easier.

In 2022 the district reached an agreement with the city of Belen to jointly fund a school police officer.

== Schools ==
Secondary schools

- Belén High School
- Belen Middle School
- Infinity High School

Elementary schools

- Central Elementary School
- Dennis Chavez Elementary School
- La Merced Elementary School
- La Promesa Elementary School
- Rio Grande Elementary School
- Gil Sanchez Elementary School
- Belén Family School
