= Department of Fish and Game =

Department of Fish and Game may refer to:

- Alaska Department of Fish and Game
- California Department of Fish and Wildlife (formerly California Department of Fish and Game)
- New Mexico Department of Game and Fish
- Idaho Department of Fish and Game
