= New Mexico State Road 309 =

State highway in New Mexico, United States

State Road 309

Route information
- Maintained by NMDOT
- Length: 2.432 mi (3.914 km)

Major junctions
- West end: I-25 BL in Belen
- East end: NM 47 near Belen

Location
- Country: United States
- State: New Mexico
- Counties: Valencia

Highway system
- New Mexico State Highway System; Interstate; US; State; Scenic
← NM 305	→ NM 311

State Road 309 (NM 309) is a 2.4-mile-long (3.9 km) state highway in the US state of New Mexico. NM 309's western terminus is at Interstate 25 Business (I-25 Bus.) in Belen, and the eastern terminus is at NM 47 east of Belen.

== Major intersections ==
The entire route is in Valencia County.

Location	mi	km	Destinations	Notes
Belen	0.000	0.000	I-25 BL	Western terminus
Belen	0.905	1.456	NM 109 south	Northern terminus of NM 109
	2.432	3.914	NM 47	Eastern terminus
1.000 mi = 1.609 km; 1.000 km = 0.621 mi
