= Sausal, New Mexico =

- Census-designated place
- Location within New Mexico
- Coordinates: 34°40′51″N 106°45′26″W
- Country: United States
- State: New Mexico
- County: Valencia

Area
  - Total: 2.25 sq mi (5.82 km^{2})
  - Land: 2.25 sq mi (5.82 km^{2})
  - Water: 0 sq mi (0.00 km^{2})
- Elevation: 4,813 ft (1,467 m)

Population (2020)
  - Total: 858
  - Density: 381.9/sq mi (147.46/km^{2})
- Time zone: UTC-7 (Mountain (MST))
  - Summer (DST): UTC-6 (MDT)
- GNIS feature ID: 2584215

Sausal is a census-designated place in Valencia County, New Mexico, United States. As of the 2020 census, Sausal had a population of 858.

== Geography ==
According to the United States Census Bureau, Sausal has a total area of 5.91 square kilometers, all land.

== Demographics ==
Historical population
| Census | Pop. | Note | %± |
|---|---|---|---|
| 2020 | 858 | | — |
U.S. Decennial Census

According to the 2010 census, 1,056 people were living in Sausal. The population density was 178.67 inhabitants per square kilometer. Of the 1,056 inhabitants, Sausal was composed by 79.92% White, 0.38% were African American, 3.31% were Native American, 0.76% were Asian, 0.19% were Pacific Islanders, 11.74% were of other races and 3.69% from two or more races. Of the total population 61.74% were Hispanic or Latino of any race.

== Education ==
Its school district is Belén Consolidated Schools. Belén High School is the district's comprehensive high school.
