= Rio Communities, New Mexico =

- City
- Location of Rio Communities, New Mexico

- Location in the United States
- Coordinates: 34°38′31″N 106°43′20″W
- Country: United States
- State: New Mexico
- County: Valencia
- Established: May 16, 2013

Government
  - Mayor: Joshua Ramsell
  - Council Members: Lawrence Gordon, Peggy Gutjahr, Art Apodaca, Jim Winters
  - Municipal Judge: H. Noelle Chavez

Area
  - Total: 7.70 sq mi (19.95 km^{2})
  - Land: 7.70 sq mi (19.93 km^{2})
  - Water: 0.0077 sq mi (0.02 km^{2})
- Elevation: 4,944 ft (1,507 m)

Population (2020)
  - Total: 4,926
  - Density: 640/sq mi (247.2/km^{2})
- Time zone: UTC-7 (Mountain (MST))
  - Summer (DST): UTC-6 (MDT)
- Area code: 505
- FIPS code: 35-63145
- GNIS feature ID: 2771703
- Website: riocommunities.net

Rio Communities is a city in Valencia County, New Mexico, United States. Prior to its incorporation on May 16, 2013, it was a census-designated place (CDP). As of the 2020 census, Rio Communities had a population of 4,926.

Rio Communities was developed by the Horizon Corporation, who sold undeveloped land. The Federal Trade Commission eventually ordered Horizon to pay money to the buyers due to false and misleading ads.

== Geography ==
According to the United States Census Bureau, the CDP has a total area of 6.1 square miles (16 km^{2}), all land.

== Demographics ==
Historical population
Census	Pop.	Note	%±
2020	4,926		—
U.S. Decennial Census

=== 2020 census ===
As of the 2020 census, Rio Communities had a population of 4,926. The median age was 45.9 years. 21.1% of residents were under the age of 18 and 25.7% of residents were 65 years of age or older. For every 100 females there were 89.8 males, and for every 100 females age 18 and over there were 86.3 males age 18 and over.

85.0% of residents lived in urban areas, while 15.0% lived in rural areas.

There were 2,017 households in Rio Communities, of which 28.6% had children under the age of 18 living in them. Of all households, 42.8% were married-couple households, 19.5% were households with a male householder and no spouse or partner present, and 30.8% were households with a female householder and no spouse or partner present. About 28.8% of all households were made up of individuals and 16.2% had someone living alone who was 65 years of age or older.

There were 2,160 housing units, of which 6.6% were vacant. The homeowner vacancy rate was 2.2% and the rental vacancy rate was 7.8%.

Racial composition as of the 2020 census
Race	Number	Percent
White	3,015	61.2%
Black or African American	90	1.8%
American Indian and Alaska Native	120	2.4%
Asian	26	0.5%
Native Hawaiian and Other Pacific Islander	8	0.2%
Some other race	719	14.6%
Two or more races	948	19.2%
Hispanic or Latino (of any race)	2,628	53.3%

=== 2010 census ===
As of the 2010 census, there were 4,723 people, 1,996 households, and 1,318 families residing in the CDP. There were 2,221 housing units. The racial makeup of the CDP was 83.4% White, 46.2% Hispanic or Latino, 2.3% African American, 1.7% were Native American, 0.5% Asian, 9.1% from other races, and 3% from two or more races.

There were 1,996 households, out of which 24.5% had children under the age of 18 living with them, 49.3% were married couples living together, 4.9% had a male householder with no wife present, 11.8% had a female householder with no husband present, and 34% were non-families. 29.4% of all households were made up of individuals, and 15.4% had someone living alone who was 65 years of age or older. The average household size was 2.37 and the average family size was 2.9.

In the CDP the population was spread out, with 25.3% under the age of 20, 4.6% from 20 to 24, 18.4% from 25 to 44, 28.2% from 45 to 64, and 23.5% who were 65 years of age or older. The median age was 44.8 years. For every 100 females, there were 89.6 males.

The median income for a household in the CDP was $33,125, and the median income for a family was $39,205. Males had a median income of $29,755 versus $26,985 for females. The per capita income for the CDP was $18,260. About 5.3% of families and 7.4% of the population were below the poverty line, including 8.1% of those under age 18 and 5.8% of those age 65 or over.

== Businesses ==
Major Businesses in Rio Communities include one convenience store, Allsup's; the 18-hole Tierra del Sol Golf Course; a Dollar General and two restaurants, Tierra del Sol, and the Longbow.

== Government ==
The city government is elected for four year terms with the Mayor, two Councilors, and the Municipal Judge off cycle by two years from the remaining two Councilors. The last Mayoral election was held in March 2018.

City Hall is located at 360 Rio Communities Blvd and the principle contact number is 505-861-6803. The City Council meets twice monthly, on the second and fourth Tuesday of each month, at 6:00pm at City Hall.

== Education ==
Its school district is Belén Consolidated Schools. Belén High School is the district's comprehensive high school.
