= New Mexico State Road 115 =

State highway in New Mexico, United States

State Road 115
- NM 115 highlighted in red

Route information
- Maintained by NMDOT
- Length: 3.457 mi (5.564 km)

Major junctions
- West end: US 84 near Cebolla
- East end: CR 455

Location
- Country: United States
- State: New Mexico
- Counties: Rio Arriba

Highway system
- New Mexico State Highway System; Interstate; US; State; Scenic
← NM 114	→ NM 116

State Road 115 (NM 115) is a 3.457-mile-long (5.564 km) state highway in the US state of New Mexico. NM 115's eastern terminus is at County Route 455 (CR 455), and the western terminus is at U.S. Route 84 (US 84) south of Cebolla.

== Major intersections ==
The entire route is in Rio Arriba County.

Location	mi	km	Destinations	Notes
	0.000	0.000	US 84	Western terminus
	3.457	5.564	CR 455	Eastern terminus
1.000 mi = 1.609 km; 1.000 km = 0.621 mi
