= Los Chavez, New Mexico =

- CDP
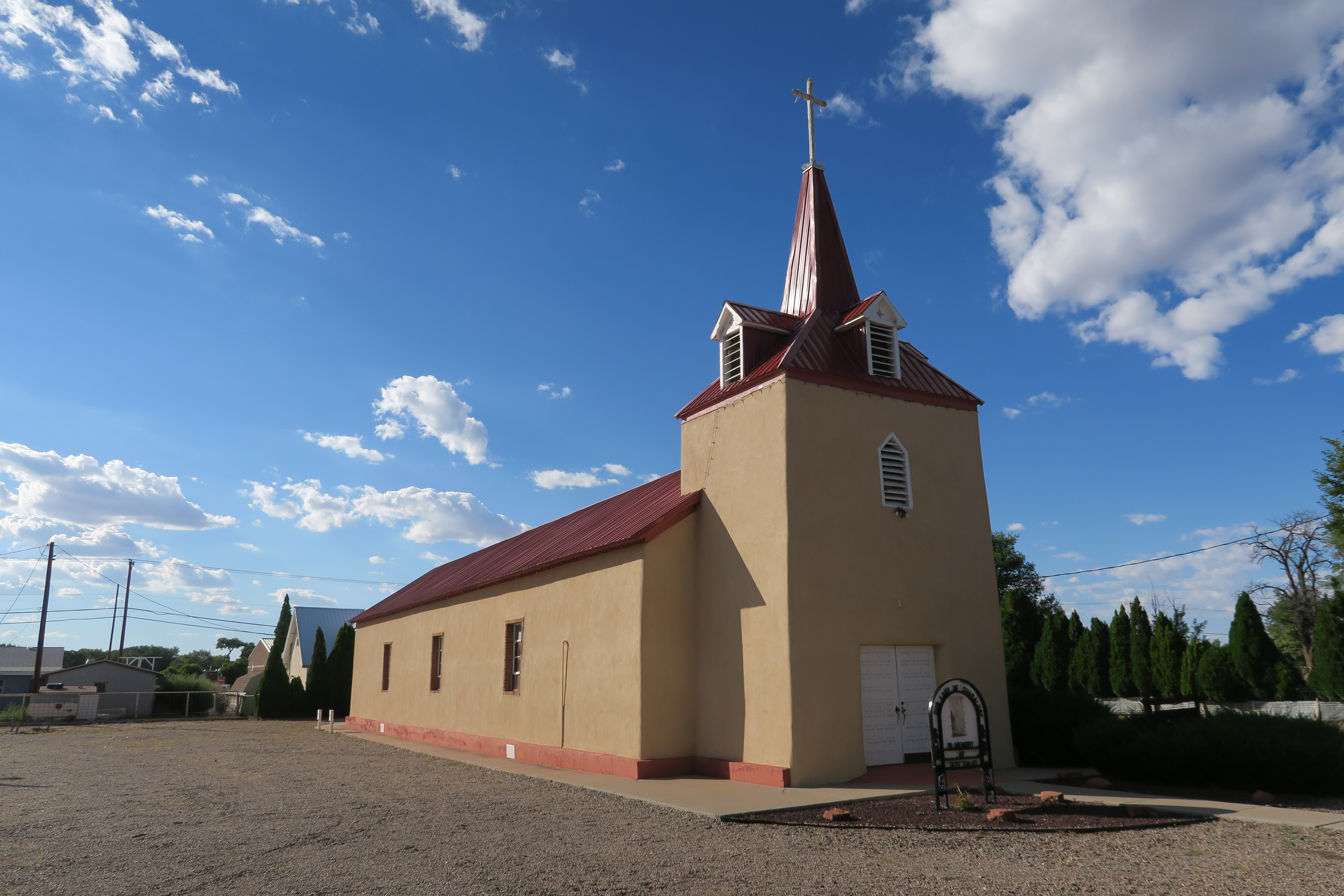
- Our Lady of Guadalupe Mission

- Location of Los Chavez, New Mexico

- Location in the United States
- Coordinates: 34°43′33″N 106°45′26″W
- Country: United States
- State: New Mexico
- County: Valencia

Area
  - Total: 11.44 sq mi (29.64 km^{2})
  - Land: 11.44 sq mi (29.64 km^{2})
  - Water: 0 sq mi (0.00 km^{2})
- Elevation: 4,823 ft (1,470 m)

Population (2020)
  - Total: 4,997
  - Density: 436.6/sq mi (168.59/km^{2})
- Time zone: UTC-7 (Mountain (MST))
  - Summer (DST): UTC-6 (MDT)
- Area code: 505
- FIPS code: 35-42740
- GNIS feature ID: 0930475

Los Chavez is a census-designated place (CDP) in Valencia County, New Mexico. The population was 5,033 at the time of the 2000 census. It is part of the Albuquerque Metropolitan Statistical Area.

== History ==
The settlement of Los Chavez, on the west bank of the Río Grande, dates to a 1738 grant to Nicolás Durán y Chávez from Atrisco. In 1790, it consisted of six plazas (Julyan 1996:78; Espinosa and Chávez 1967:41- 43). It was included in the 1802 census (Olmsted 1981:139-140). In the autumn of 1847, a unit of the U.S. Army traveled south along the west bank of the Río Grande. Philip Gooch Ferguson reported that “the road most generally traveled” was on the east bank, but the west side of the river was better for water. Ferguson mentioned camping near a small town named “Plaza Chavez” (Bieber 1936:326-328).

== Geography ==
According to the United States Census Bureau, the CDP has a total area of 10.2 square miles (26 km^{2}), all land.

== Demographics ==
Historical population
Census	Pop.	Note	%±
2020	4,997		—
U.S. Decennial Census

As of the census of 2000, there were 5,033 people, 1,764 households, and 1,365 families residing in the CDP. The population density was 491.7 inhabitants per square mile (189.8/km^{2}). There were 1,888 housing units at an average density of 184.4 units per square mile (71.2 units/km^{2}). The racial makeup of the CDP was 66.42% White, 0.60% African American, 1.27% Native American, 0.20% Asian, 0.02% Pacific Islander, 26.43% from other races, and 5.07% from two or more races. Hispanic or Latino of any race were 54.10% of the population.

There were 1,764 households, out of which 40.1% had children under the age of 18 living with them, 58.7% were married couples living together, 13.2% had a female householder with no husband present, and 22.6% were non-families. 17.2% of all households were made up of individuals, and 5.4% had someone living alone who was 65 years of age or older. The average household size was 2.85 and the average family size was 3.21.

In the CDP, the population was spread out, with 30.0% under the age of 18, 7.4% from 18 to 24, 30.5% from 25 to 44, 23.5% from 45 to 64, and 8.6% who were 65 years of age or older. The median age was 35 years. For every 100 females, there were 99.6 males. For every 100 females age 18 and over, there were 95.4 males.

The median income for a household in the CDP was $38,228, and the median income for a family was $40,896. Males had a median income of $32,278 versus $22,537 for females. The per capita income for the CDP was $16,092. About 13.1% of families and 15.8% of the population were below the poverty line, including 20.3% of those under age 18 and 12.7% of those age 65 or over.

== Education ==
The majority of Los Chavez is in Belen Consolidated Schools, while a portion is in Los Lunas Public Schools. Belén High School is the Belén district's comprehensive high school.

== Notable people ==
- Dennis Chávez, member of the U.S. House of Representatives and U.S. Senate
- Antoinette Sedillo Lopez, attorney and member of the New Mexico Senate
