= Bosque, New Mexico =

- Unincorporated community
- Location within New Mexico
- Coordinates: 34°33′36″N 106°47′21″W
- Country: United States
- State: New Mexico
- County: Valencia
- Elevation: 4,780 ft (1,460 m)
- Time zone: UTC-7 (Mountain (MST))
  - Summer (DST): UTC-6 (MDT)
- ZIP code: 87006
- Area code: 505
- GNIS feature ID: 899545

Bosque is an unincorporated community in Valencia County, New Mexico, United States. Bosque is located at the junction of New Mexico State Road 116 and New Mexico State Road 346 7.1 miles (11.4 km) south of Belen. Bosque has a post office with ZIP code 87006. It was named for its location in the bosque of the Rio Grande valley. The town has been settled since 1750, when several Hispanicized tribes farmed here.
