= Jarales, New Mexico =

- CDP
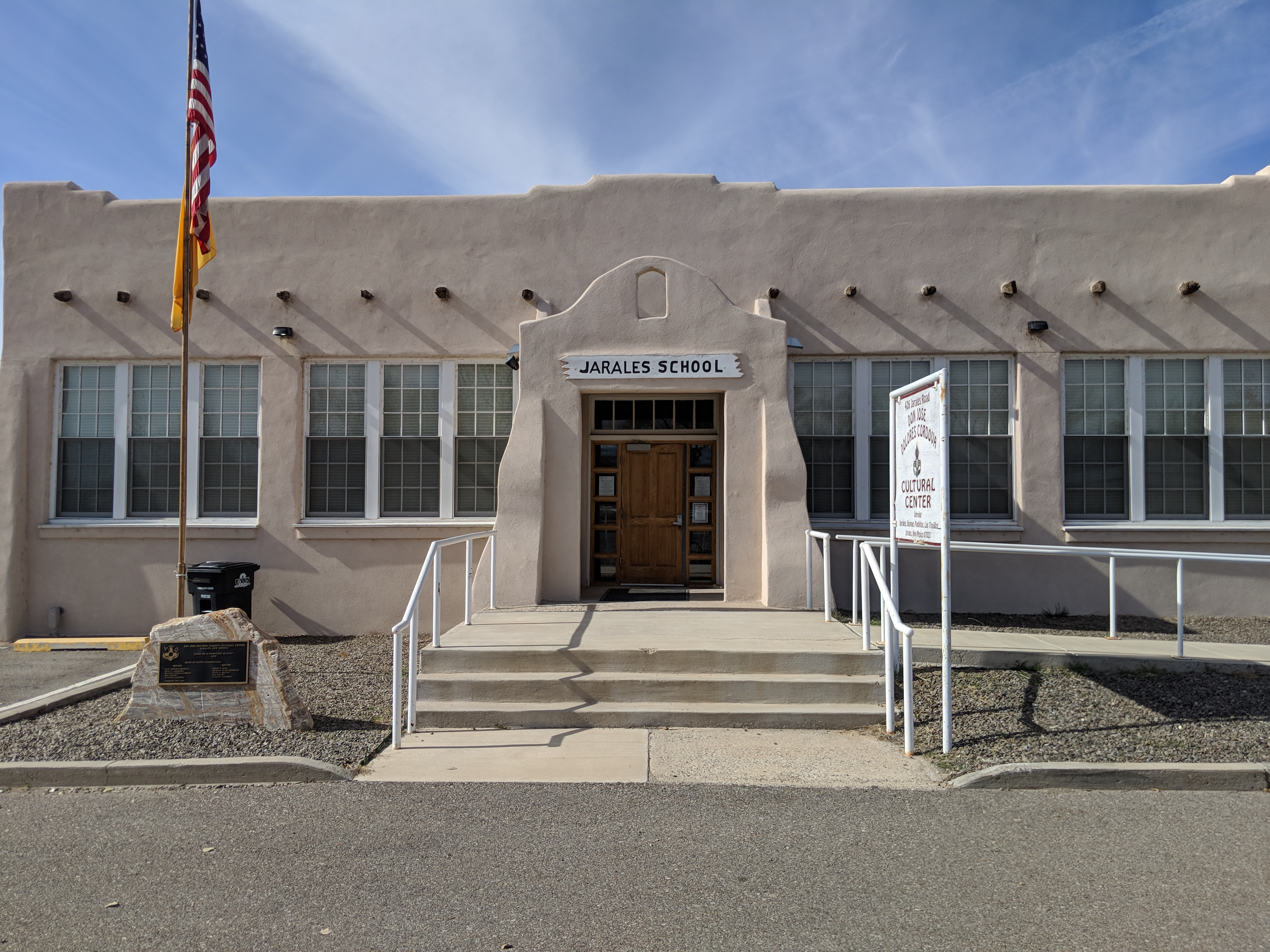
- Jarales School

- Location of Jarales, New Mexico

- Location in the United States
- Coordinates: 34°37′50″N 106°45′24″W
- Country: United States
- State: New Mexico
- County: Valencia

Area
  - Total: 8.72 sq mi (22.58 km^{2})
  - Land: 8.72 sq mi (22.58 km^{2})
  - Water: 0 sq mi (0.00 km^{2})
- Elevation: 4,790 ft (1,460 m)

Population (2020)
  - Total: 2,042
  - Density: 234.3/sq mi (90.45/km^{2})
- Time zone: UTC-7 (Mountain (MST))
  - Summer (DST): UTC-6 (MDT)
- ZIP code: 87023
- Area code: 505
- FIPS code: 35-35110
- GNIS feature ID: 2408439

Jarales is a census-designated place (CDP) in Valencia County, New Mexico, United States. As of the 2020 census, Jarales had a population of 2,042. It is part of the Albuquerque Metropolitan Statistical Area.

== Geography ==
According to the United States Census Bureau, the CDP has a total area of 8.7 square miles (23 km^{2}), all land.

== Demographics ==
Historical population
Census	Pop.	Note	%±
2020	2,042		—
U.S. Decennial Census

=== 2020 census ===
As of the 2020 census, Jarales had a population of 2,042. The median age was 46.4 years. 20.5% of residents were under the age of 18 and 21.7% of residents were 65 years of age or older. For every 100 females there were 110.7 males, and for every 100 females age 18 and over there were 104.4 males age 18 and over.

30.6% of residents lived in urban areas, while 69.4% lived in rural areas.

There were 800 households in Jarales, of which 32.1% had children under the age of 18 living in them. Of all households, 53.6% were married-couple households, 20.1% were households with a male householder and no spouse or partner present, and 19.0% were households with a female householder and no spouse or partner present. About 19.9% of all households were made up of individuals and 11.4% had someone living alone who was 65 years of age or older.

There were 870 housing units, of which 8.0% were vacant. The homeowner vacancy rate was 1.3% and the rental vacancy rate was 10.5%.

Racial composition as of the 2020 census
Race	Number	Percent
White	1,101	53.9%
Black or African American	21	1.0%
American Indian and Alaska Native	31	1.5%
Asian	5	0.2%
Native Hawaiian and Other Pacific Islander	0	0.0%
Some other race	437	21.4%
Two or more races	447	21.9%
Hispanic or Latino (of any race)	1,372	67.2%

=== 2000 census ===
As of the census of 2000, there were 1,434 people, 505 households, and 394 families residing in the CDP. The population density was 250.1 inhabitants per square mile (96.6/km^{2}). There were 534 housing units at an average density of 93.1 per square mile (35.9/km^{2}). The racial makeup of the CDP was 68.83% White, 0.63% African American, 0.91% Native American, 0.28% Asian, 25.52% from other races, and 3.84% from two or more races. Hispanic or Latino of any race were 64.57% of the population.

There were 505 households, out of which 35.8% had children under the age of 18 living with them, 61.2% were married couples living together, 9.9% had a female householder with no husband present, and 21.8% were non-families. 17.2% of all households were made up of individuals, and 6.3% had someone living alone who was 65 years of age or older. The average household size was 2.84 and the average family size was 3.20.

In the CDP, the population was spread out, with 29.4% under the age of 18, 7.3% from 18 to 24, 29.0% from 25 to 44, 24.5% from 45 to 64, and 9.8% who were 65 years of age or older. The median age was 35 years. For every 100 females, there were 99.2 males. For every 100 females age 18 and over, there were 99.2 males.

The median income for a household in the CDP was $26,897, and the median income for a family was $34,464. Males had a median income of $26,813 versus $15,909 for females. The per capita income for the CDP was $12,561. About 9.5% of families and 13.9% of the population were below the poverty line, including 15.9% of those under age 18 and 15.7% of those age 65 or over.

== Education ==
Its school district is Belén Consolidated Schools. Belén High School is the district's comprehensive high school.
