= New Mexico State Road 347 =

Highway in New Mexico

State Road 347
- Paseo del Volcan
- NM 347 highlighted in red

Route information
- Maintained by NMDOT
- Length: 7.142 mi (11.494 km)
- Existed: 2010–present

Major junctions
- South end: Unser Boulevard in Rio Rancho
- North end: US 550 in Rio Rancho

Location
- Country: United States
- State: New Mexico
- Counties: Sandoval

Highway system
- New Mexico State Highway System; Interstate; US; State; Scenic
← NM 346	→ NM 348

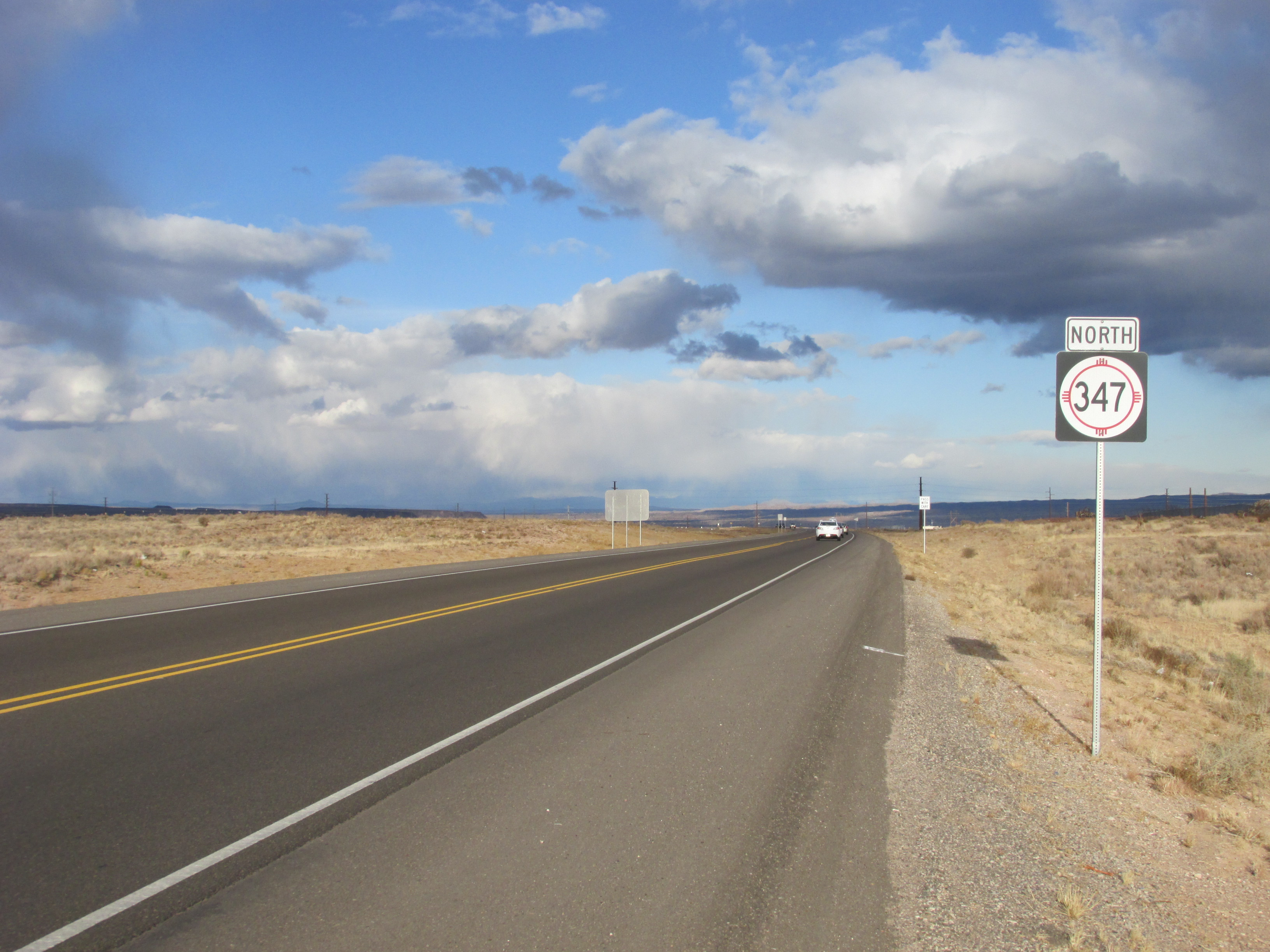
NM 347 northbound

New Mexico State Road 347 (NM 347) is a partially completed highway in New Mexico. It currently runs along Paseo del Volcan between Unser Boulevard and US-550 in Rio Rancho for 7.1 miles. NM-347 is planned to stretch around Rio Rancho and back into Albuquerque to connect with Interstate 40, providing full access for the far west side of the Albuquerque metro.

Currently a 2-lane road, NM 347 right-of-way is 150 feet wide to accommodate expansion to a freeway, should future growth and traffic demand necessitate the construction of a freeway along the Paseo del Volcan corridor.

== History ==
An environmental impact statement for the Paseo del Volcan project was approved in August 2001 by the Federal Highway Administration (FHWA). Phase 1 of the project, a 3.9-mile (6.3 km) segment between Unser Blvd. and Iris Road was completed in October 2006. The road was designated as State Road 347 between I-40 and US 550 in August 2010. The Phase 2 extension 3.4 miles (5.5 km) eastward to US 550 was opened to traffic in February 2011. Land acquisition is currently in progress for a further extension westward from Unser Blvd. to Rainbow Blvd. In July 2011, a street west of Albuquerque also known as Paseo del Volcan was renamed Atrisco Vista Blvd. to avoid a naming conflict. Atrisco Vista Blvd. intersects I-40 at Exit 149 only 1.5 miles (2.4 km) east of the proposed interchange with NM 347. Interchange construction at I-40 will be Phase 3 of the project and awaits acquisition of individual private parcels along the Interstate.

Long-range planning anticipates the roadway requiring up to five additional lanes by 2035. Extending the road to link to I-25 on both the north and south ends to create a western bypass in metropolitan Albuquerque is also being planned.

== Major intersections ==
The following only represents the roadway as completed and open to traffic. The entire route is in Rio Rancho, Sandoval County.

mi	km	Destinations	Notes
0.00	0.00	Unser Boulevard – Albuquerque	Current southern terminus
7.14	11.49	US 550 – Bernalillo, Cuba	Northern terminus
1.000 mi = 1.609 km; 1.000 km = 0.621 mi
