= Veguita, New Mexico =

- Census-designated place
- Location within New Mexico
- Coordinates: 34°30′53″N 106°46′04″W
- Country: United States
- State: New Mexico
- County: Socorro

Area
  - Total: 0.84 sq mi (2.17 km^{2})
  - Land: 0.84 sq mi (2.17 km^{2})
  - Water: 0 sq mi (0.00 km^{2})
- Elevation: 4,771 ft (1,454 m)

Population (2020)
  - Total: 219
  - Density: 262/sq mi (101.1/km^{2})
- Time zone: UTC-7 (Mountain (MST))
  - Summer (DST): UTC-6 (MDT)
- ZIP code: 87062
- Area code: 575
- GNIS feature ID: 2584230

Veguita is a census-designated place in Socorro County, New Mexico, United States. As of the 2020 census, Veguita had a population of 219. Veguita has a post office with ZIP code 87062. New Mexico State Road 304 passes through the community.

One community fixture is "Veguita Trading Post" which has a fueling station, and provides commodities. In 2015, the Veguita community welcomed KVNM-LP 101.1 FM, one of two low power FM Radio Stations in Socorro County.

Veguita has two independent Christian churches, Chihuahua Bible Chapel, and Iglesia Evangelica "Camino De Fe", which share facilities on Carlos Martinez Road. There also is the Mission Church of the Catholic Diocese. Veguita is the home of iDea Ministries, which is the owner-operator of KVNM-LP 101.1 FM, and produces "Jazz, Power, & The Glory!".

== Demographics ==
Historical population
Census	Pop.	Note	%±
2020	219		—
U.S. Decennial Census

== Education ==
Its school district is Belén Consolidated Schools. Belén High School is the district's comprehensive high school.
