= Las Maravillas, New Mexico =

- Census-designated place
- Location within New Mexico
- Coordinates: 34°44′02″N 106°40′08″W
- Country: United States
- State: New Mexico
- County: Valencia

Area
  - Total: 1.01 sq mi (2.62 km^{2})
  - Land: 1.01 sq mi (2.61 km^{2})
  - Water: 0 sq mi (0.00 km^{2})
- Elevation: 5,013 ft (1,528 m)

Population (2020)
  - Total: 1,604
  - Density: 1,588.8/sq mi (613.44/km^{2})
- Time zone: UTC-7 (Mountain (MST))
  - Summer (DST): UTC-6 (MDT)
- GNIS feature ID: 2584133

Las Maravillas is a census-designated place in Valencia County, New Mexico, United States. As of the 2020 census, Las Maravillas had a population of 1,604.

== Geography ==
According to the United States Census Bureau, Las Maravillas has a total area of 1.02 square miles (2.6 km^{2}), of which 0.0039 square miles (0.010 km^{2}) is water.

== Demographics ==
Historical population
| Census | Pop. | Note | %± |
|---|---|---|---|
| 2020 | 1,604 | | — |
U.S. Decennial Census

According to the 2010 census, 1628 people were living in Las Maravillas. The population density was 615.04 inhabitants per km^{2}. Of the 1628 inhabitants, Las Maravillas was composed by 79.48% White, 1.04% were African American, 2.33% were Native American, 0.61% were Asian, 0.31% were Pacific Islanders, 11.3% were of other races and 4.91% from two or more races. Of the total population 47.79% were Hispanic or Latino of any race.

== Education ==
The majority of Las Maravillas is in Los Lunas Public Schools, while a portion is in Belen Consolidated Schools. Belén High School is the Belén district's comprehensive high school.
