= Abeytas, New Mexico =

- Census-designated place
- Location within New Mexico
- Coordinates: 34°27′55″N 106°48′50″W
- Country: United States
- State: New Mexico
- County: Socorro

Area
  - Total: 1.23 sq mi (3.19 km^{2})
  - Land: 1.23 sq mi (3.19 km^{2})
  - Water: 0 sq mi (0.00 km^{2})
- Elevation: 4,744 ft (1,446 m)

Population (2020)
  - Total: 45
  - Density: 36.5/sq mi (14.09/km^{2})
- Time zone: UTC-7 (Mountain (MST))
  - Summer (DST): UTC-6 (MDT)
- ZIP code: 87006
- Area code: 575
- GNIS feature ID: 2584042

Abeytas is a census-designated place in Socorro County, New Mexico, United States. As of the 2020 census, Abeytas had a population of 45. In 1950 it had a population of 10.

== Demographics ==
Historical population
Census	Pop.	Note	%±
2020	45		—
U.S. Decennial Census

== Education ==
Its school district is Belén Consolidated Schools. Belén High School is the district's comprehensive high school.
