= Allsup LLC =

Allsup LLC based in Belleville, Illinois, near St. Louis, provides Social Security disability, veterans disability appeal, disability financial solutions, return to work, and healthcare benefits services for individuals, their employers and insurance carriers.

== History ==
Jim (James) Allsup founded the company as Allsup & Associates in 1984 to "help people with disabilities collect the insurance benefits they paid for" by assisting individuals with disabilities in securing Social Security disability benefits. Jim has testified before Congress multiple times in the legislative clarification of the 1993 Omnibus Budget Reconciliation Act, which mandated that Medicare become the primary payer for non-working employees with disabilities.

In the U.S. House Committee on Ways and Means Social Security Subcommittee hearings in the summer of 1995, Jim proposed, with two associates, the creation of a return-to-work pilot program that was a catalyst for the 1999 legislation creating the Ticket to Work Program.

CEO Jim Allsup published a book on the SSDI application process in 2018.

== Other services ==
Allsup Employment Services (AES) is a subsidiary established in 2014 to operate as a Social Security Administration-authorized Employment Network. The division assists beneficiaries of SSDI in returning to the workforce through the Ticket to Work program.

AES provides vocational rehabilitation services, including the development of individual work plans and guidance on earnings reporting to protect disability benefits during the transition to employment. The division operates as a national network facilitating job market reentry for specific demographics, including older adults and individuals recovering from critical illnesses.

== Award ==
Allsup was named the USA Today Top Workplaces in 2024 and 2025.

The company was recognized in 2024 as one of the top 10 largest veteran-owned businesses in the St. Louis metropolitan area.

Allsup was selected as an International Better Business Bureau Finalist in 2010.
