= Bernardo, New Mexico =

- Unincorporated community
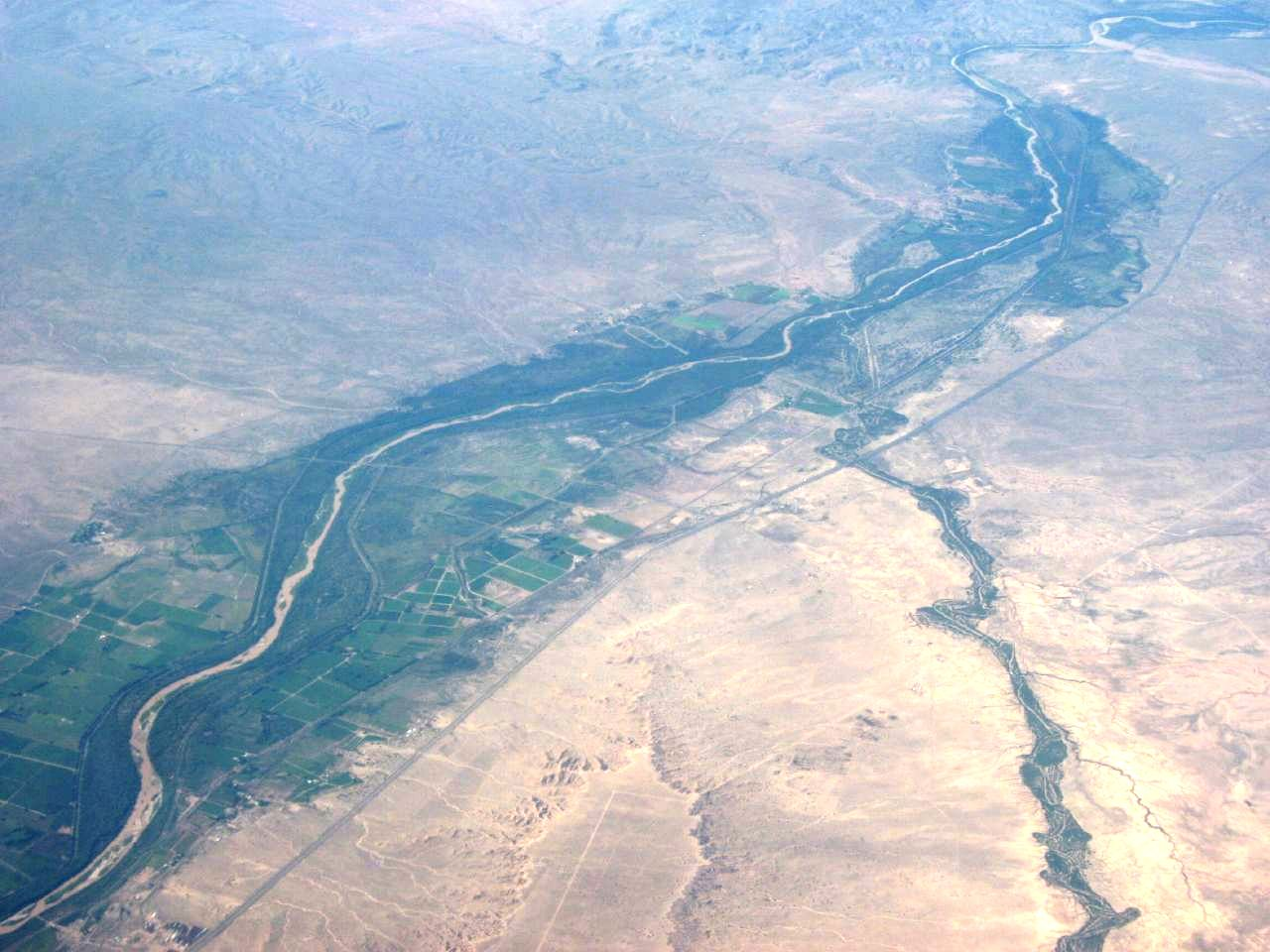
- Rio Grande and Interstate 25 passing through Bernardo and Contreras, New Mexico. View from the northwest. Rio Puerco flowing toward the Rio Grande from the west.
- Interactive map of Bernardo, New Mexico
- Coordinates: 34°25′07″N 106°50′01″W
- Country: United States
- State: New Mexico
- County: Socorro
- Elevation: 4,741 ft (1,445 m)
- Time zone: UTC-7 (Mountain (MST))
  - Summer (DST): UTC-6 (MDT)
- Area code: 505
- GNIS feature ID: 923560

Bernardo is an unincorporated community in Socorro County, New Mexico, United States, at the northern junction of US 60 and Interstate 25. Bernardo was named, circa 1902, after a friend of John Becker, a leading merchant in nearby Belen. The main point of interest is the nearby Bernardo Wildlife Management Area, visited by large flocks of sandhill cranes and other birds.

== Location ==
Bernardo is situated in the Albuquerque Basin on the west bank of the Rio Grande, just north and upstream from that river's confluence with the Rio Puerco. There is an RV park and Horse Motel on the west side of I-25, across from the Waterfowl Management Area, on the old Route 66. The landscape in the area consists of cultivated fields, grassland, marshland and ephemeral river. Ladron Peak is just to the west and Bernardo State Game Refuge is just east of the settlement. Collectors of rocks and minerals may find petrified and opalized wood on east side of the Rio Grande near the route 60 bridge. Seven miles east of the Bernardo interchange is Micah Village, an intentional community.

== Waterways ==
The United States Geological Survey operates a gauging station on the Rio Puerco near Bernardo. It routinely measures sediment concentrations of more than 600,000ppm, and over fifty years has measured an average of 113,000ppm, making Rio Puerco the fourth most sediment-laden river on Earth. During drought periods, the Rio Puerco may dry up almost completely. A conveyance channel of the Rio Grande runs past Bernardo. In March 2007 the U.S. Senate set aside ten million dollars for flood damage repairs to levees in the region, including the levee between Abeytas and Bernardo.

== Birdlife ==
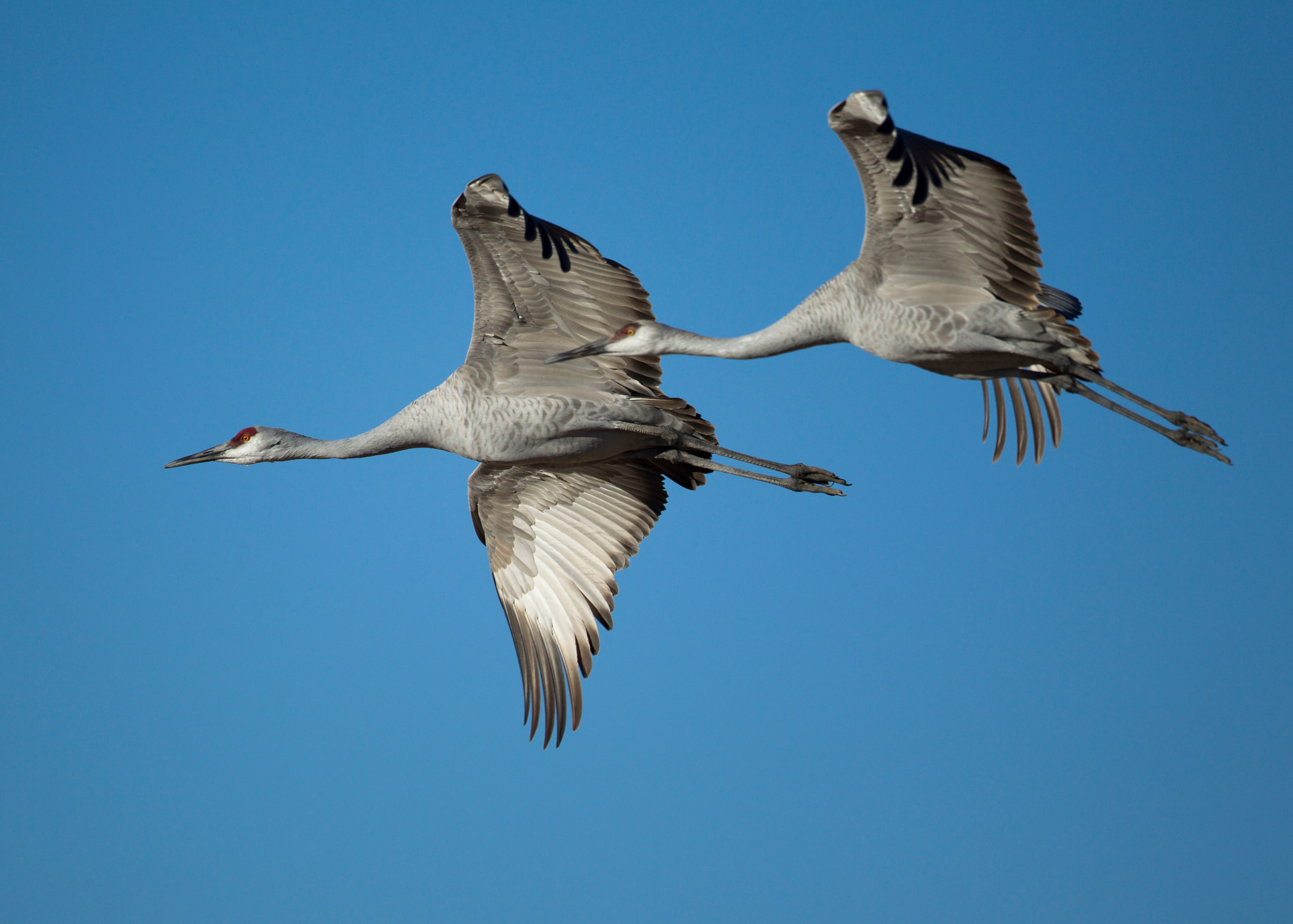
Sandhill cranes at nearby Bosque del Apache National Wildlife Refuge

The New Mexico Department of Water Game and Fish manages the Bernardo Wildlife Management Area, a unit of the Ladd S. Gordon Waterfowl Complex. It covers 1,700 acres (690 ha) that have been set aside to provide a winter habitat for waterfowl such as ducks and geese and for sandhill cranes. A flock containing as many as 5,000 cranes may congregate at one time in the area. There are three observation decks along a 2.8 miles (4.5 km) dirt road near the Rio Grande. A separate 3 miles (4.8 km) loop goes through some of the huge, undeveloped area of grasslands along a deep channel of the Rio Puerco.

Fields of parched corn and of alfalfa are planted to provide bird food. The birds are wary of predators such as coyotes who may lurk in the standing corn, but sections are pulled down for them so they can eat in safety. In the winter some of the fields may be flooded, or there may be ponds where the cranes roost for safety. Mule deer sometimes share the fields with the birds.

== Climate ==
According to the Köppen Climate Classification system, Bernardo has a cold semi-arid climate, abbreviated "BSk" on climate maps. The hottest temperature recorded in Bernardo was 113 °F (45.0 °C) on June 26, 1994, while the coldest temperature recorded was −20 °F (−28.9 °C) on January 8, 1971.

Climate data for Bernardo, New Mexico, 1991–2020 normals, extremes 1962–2025
Month	Jan	Feb	Mar	Apr	May	Jun	Jul	Aug	Sep	Oct	Nov	Dec	Year
Record high °F (°C)	71 (22)	79 (26)	89 (32)	96 (36)	103 (39)	113 (45)	111 (44)	109 (43)	103 (39)	96 (36)	83 (28)	75 (24)	113 (45)
Mean daily maximum °F (°C)	52.6 (11.4)	59.3 (15.2)	68.2 (20.1)	76.1 (24.5)	84.6 (29.2)	94.0 (34.4)	94.6 (34.8)	92.1 (33.4)	86.0 (30.0)	75.3 (24.1)	62.2 (16.8)	51.3 (10.7)	74.7 (23.7)
Daily mean °F (°C)	35.6 (2.0)	41.5 (5.3)	49.5 (9.7)	56.7 (13.7)	65.2 (18.4)	74.5 (23.6)	77.9 (25.5)	75.8 (24.3)	68.6 (20.3)	56.9 (13.8)	44.0 (6.7)	35.3 (1.8)	56.8 (13.8)
Mean daily minimum °F (°C)	18.6 (−7.4)	23.7 (−4.6)	30.8 (−0.7)	37.4 (3.0)	45.8 (7.7)	55.0 (12.8)	61.1 (16.2)	59.5 (15.3)	51.1 (10.6)	38.5 (3.6)	25.7 (−3.5)	19.3 (−7.1)	38.9 (3.8)
Record low °F (°C)	−20 (−29)	−7 (−22)	−3 (−19)	7 (−14)	10 (−12)	24 (−4)	40 (4)	34 (1)	24 (−4)	7 (−14)	−3 (−19)	−9 (−23)	−20 (−29)
Average precipitation inches (mm)	0.18 (4.6)	0.36 (9.1)	0.47 (12)	0.27 (6.9)	0.52 (13)	0.60 (15)	1.78 (45)	1.21 (31)	1.05 (27)	0.72 (18)	0.43 (11)	0.61 (15)	8.20 (208)
Average snowfall inches (cm)	1.4 (3.6)	0.3 (0.76)	0.4 (1.0)	0.0 (0.0)	0.0 (0.0)	0.0 (0.0)	0.0 (0.0)	0.0 (0.0)	0.0 (0.0)	0.4 (1.0)	0.4 (1.0)	1.8 (4.6)	4.7 (11.96)
Average precipitation days (≥ 0.01 in)	2.2	2.8	2.5	1.7	2.6	2.5	5.8	6.3	4.4	3.6	1.9	2.6	38.9
Average snowy days (≥ 0.1 in)	0.8	0.4	0.2	0.0	0.0	0.0	0.0	0.0	0.0	0.2	0.2	0.9	2.7
Source 1: NOAA
Source 2: xmACIS2
