= New Mexico State Road 304 =

State highway in New Mexico, United States

State Road 304

Route information
- Maintained by NMDOT
- Length: 23.284 mi (37.472 km)

Major junctions
- Southern end: Calle De Centro Street in La Joya
- US 60
- Northern end: NM 47 in Rio Communities

Location
- Country: United States
- State: New Mexico
- Counties: Socorro, Valencia

Highway system
- New Mexico State Highway System; Interstate; US; State; Scenic
← NM 303	→ NM 305

State Road 304 (NM 304) is a 23.3-mile-long (37.5 km) state highway in the US state of New Mexico. NM 304's northern terminus is at NM 47 in Rio Communities, and the southern terminus is at Calle De Centro Street in La Joya.

== Major intersections ==
County	Location	mi	km	Destinations	Notes
Socorro	La Joya	0.000	0.000	Calle De Centro Street	Southern terminus
Socorro		6.660	10.718	US 60	
Valencia		15.580	25.074	NM 346 west	Eastern terminus of NM 346
Valencia	Rio Communities	23.284	37.472	NM 47	Northern terminus
1.000 mi = 1.609 km; 1.000 km = 0.621 mi
