= New Mexico State Road 116 =

State highway in New Mexico, United States

State Road 116

Route information
- Maintained by NMDOT
- Length: 15.792 mi (25.415 km)

Major junctions
- South end: US 60 in Bernardo
- North end: I-25 BL near Belen

Location
- Country: United States
- State: New Mexico
- Counties: Socorro, Valencia

Highway system
- New Mexico State Highway System; Interstate; US; State; Scenic
← NM 115	→ NM 117

State Road 116 (NM 116) is a 15.792 miles (25.415 km) long state highway in the US state of New Mexico. NM 116's northern terminus is at I-25 Bus. south of Belen, and the southern terminus is in Bernardo at U.S. Route 60 (US 60).

== Major intersections ==
County	Location	mi	km	Destinations	Notes
Socorro	Bernardo	0.000	0.000	US 60	Southern terminus
Valencia		10.292	16.563	NM 346 east	Western terminus of NM 346
Valencia		15.792	25.415	I-25 BL to I-25	Northern terminus
1.000 mi = 1.609 km; 1.000 km = 0.621 mi
