= Casa Colorada =

Colonial house in Santiago, Chile

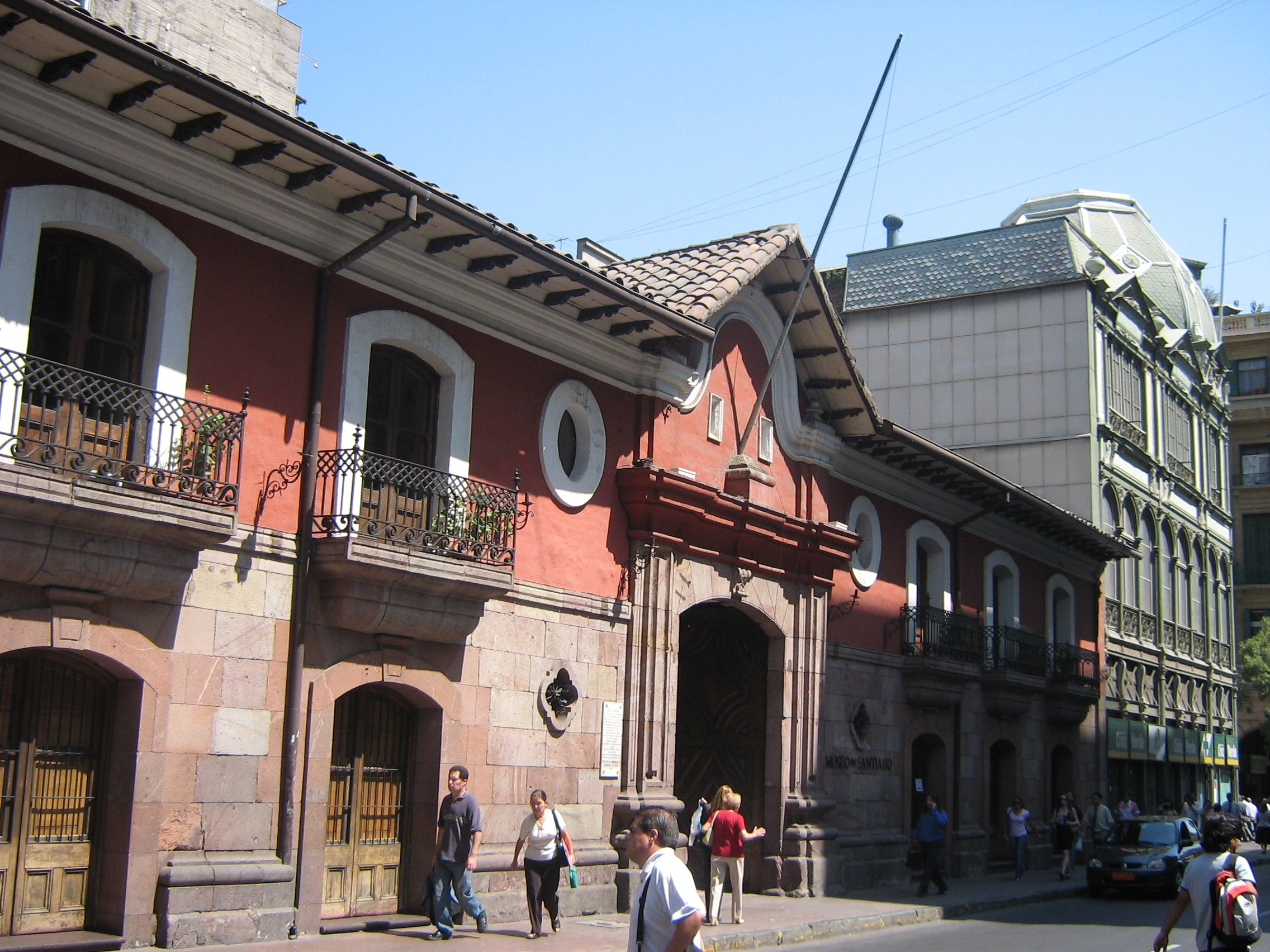
- Casa Colorada

- Location within Chile

General information
- Status: Completed
- Coordinates: 33°26′19″S 70°38′57″W
- Completed: 1769

Casa Colorada (English: Red House) is a colonial house located in Santiago, Chile. It was built in 1769, by Joseph de la Vega for Mateo de Toro Zambrano, then transferred to the Irarrazaval Family and currently houses the Museo de Santiago (English: Museum of Santiago). The house has a clay-tiled roof, balconied windows, and deep-red walls, and consists of two storeys.

Visitors walk through the homes two large patios to get the Museo de Santiago, which occupies five of Casa Colorada's rooms. The museum explores Santiago's history from the Pre-Columbian era to contemporary times.
