= Allsup's =

Convenience store retail chain

- Type: Subsidiary
- Industry: Retail (convenience stores)
- Founded: Roswell, New Mexico (1956; 70 years ago, as "Lonnie's Drive-In Grocery")
- Headquarters: Fort Worth, Texas, United States
- Number of locations: 430
- Parent: Yesway
- Website: www.allsups.com

Allsup's Convenience Stores, Inc. is a privately owned chain of convenience stores with over 400 locations, mostly in New Mexico, West Texas, and Oklahoma. It is a 24-hour chain selling fuel under the Shell, DK, Alon, ConocoPhillips, Exxon, Valero, and "Allsup's On the Go" brands. It also sells traditional convenience store items and prepared food items, and is particularly noted for their world famous burritos and chimichangas. The company's main competitors are Circle K and 7-Eleven/Stripes.

== History ==
The original concept was established by Lonnie and Barbara Allsup in Roswell, New Mexico, in 1956, as Lonnie's Drive-In Grocery. Lonnie, a veteran of the United States Air Force who served in the Korean War, expanded the business into a small chain and sold it to 7-Eleven in 1963. With the earnings of that sale, the Allsup family relocated to Clovis, New Mexico, and began the Allsup's convenience store chain.

Allsup's is known for being the first company to introduce self-serve gas pumps. It is ranked as New Mexico's #1 privately owned corporation, and is the largest convenience store chain in the state.

The original founder, Lonnie Allsup, died in January 2018.

== Purchase by Yesway ==
On October 8, 2019, Yesway entered into a definitive agreement to purchase Allsup's Convenience Stores Inc. Yesway officially acquired Allsup's convenience stores in November 2019. "All of us at Yesway are excited to be joining together with Allsup's, one of the most iconic and adored convenience-store chains in the country," stated Tom Trkla, chairman and CEO of Yesway. Yesway is owned by the investment firm Brookwood.

Allsup's underwent changes after the purchase, such as introducing Yesway mugs, cups, and other merchandise. Yesway also introduced Yesway branded chocolate bars and other candies.

In 2020, the home office was relocated from Clovis, New Mexico to Fort Worth, Texas.
