= Casa Colorada, New Mexico =

- CDP
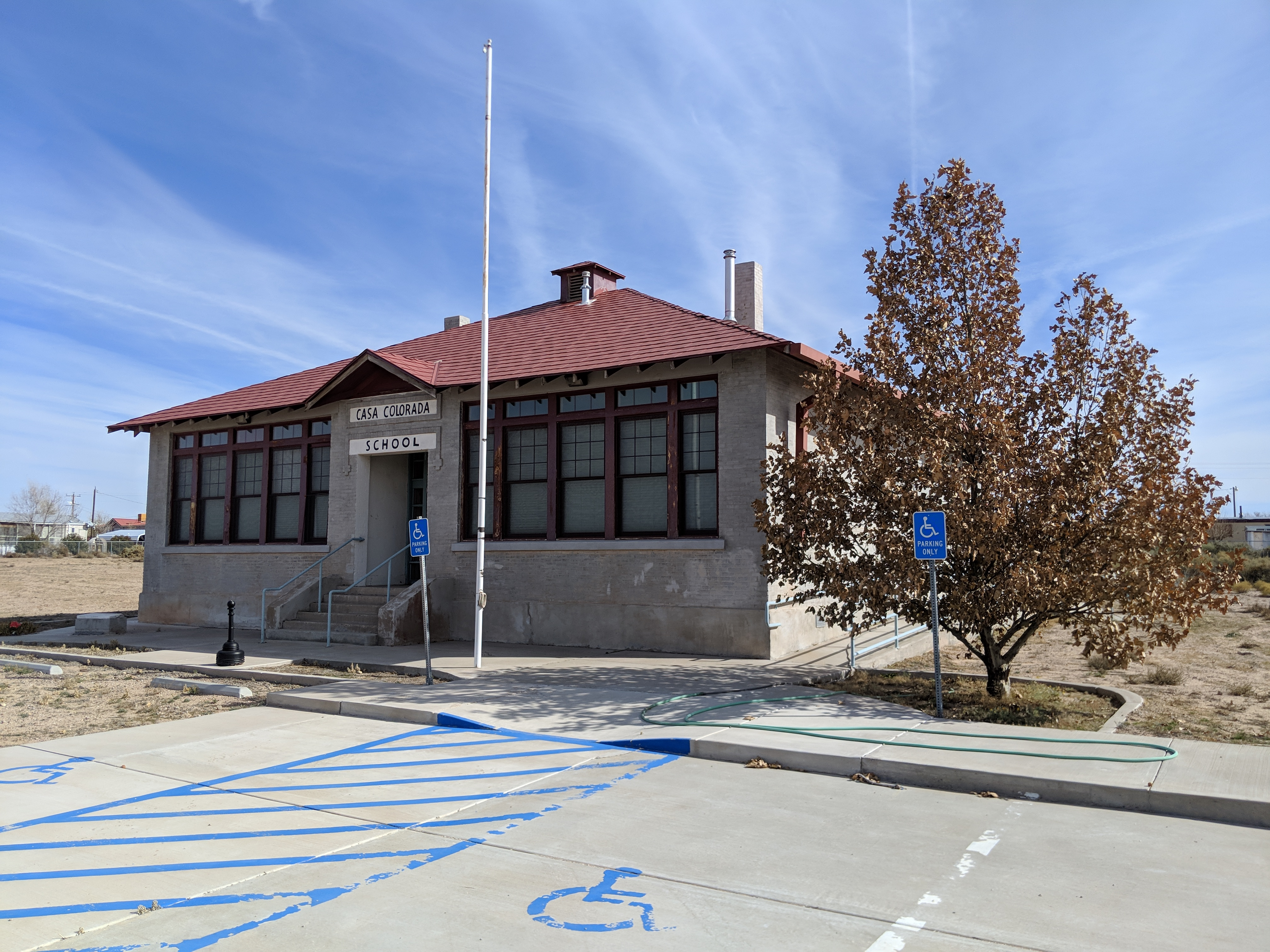
- Casa Colorada School

- Location of Casa Colorada, New Mexico

- Location in the United States
- Coordinates: 34°33′12″N 106°44′48″W
- Country: United States
- State: New Mexico
- County: Valencia

Area
  - Total: 5.53 sq mi (14.31 km^{2})
  - Land: 5.52 sq mi (14.29 km^{2})
  - Water: 0.0077 sq mi (0.02 km^{2})
- Elevation: 4,853 ft (1,479 m)

Population (2020)
  - Total: 279
  - Density: 50.6/sq mi (19.52/km^{2})
- Time zone: UTC-7 (Mountain (MST))
  - Summer (DST): UTC-6 (MDT)
- Area code: 505
- FIPS code: 35-12786
- GNIS feature ID: 2407977

Casa Colorada is a census-designated place (CDP) in Valencia County, New Mexico, United States. As of the 2020 census, Casa Colorada had a population of 279. It is part of the Albuquerque Metropolitan Statistical Area.

== Geography ==
According to the United States Census Bureau, the CDP has a total area of 5.6 square miles (15 km^{2}), all land.

== Demographics ==
Historical population
Census	Pop.	Note	%±
2020	279		—
U.S. Decennial Census

As of the census of 2000, there were 56 people, 20 households, and 16 families residing in the CDP. The population density was 164.6 inhabitants per square mile (63.6/km^{2}). There were 21 housing units at an average density of 61.7 per square mile (23.8/km^{2}). The racial makeup of the CDP was 60.71% White, 1.79% Native American, 25.00% from other races, and 12.50% from two or more races. Hispanic or Latino of any race were 73.21% of the population.

There were 20 households, out of which 40.0% had children under the age of 18 living with them, 80.0% were married couples living together, and 20.0% were non-families. 20.0% of all households were made up of individuals, and 10.0% had someone living alone who was 65 years of age or older. The average household size was 2.80 and the average family size was 3.25.

In the CDP, the population was spread out, with 25.0% under the age of 18, 10.7% from 18 to 24, 21.4% from 25 to 44, 30.4% from 45 to 64, and 12.5% who were 65 years of age or older. The median age was 42 years. For every 100 females, there were 115.4 males. For every 100 females age 18 and over, there were 110.0 males.

The median income for a household in the CDP was $16,750, and the median income for a family was $40,208. Males had a median income of $21,250 versus $21,250 for females. The per capita income for the CDP was $7,059. There were 45.5% of families and 41.2% of the population living below the poverty line, including 55.0% of under eighteens and none of those over 64.

== History ==
Although Casa Colorado may have been a seventeenth-century landmark, it did not begin its existence as a community until early in the nineteenth century.

On May 19, 1760, after coming to Sevilleta, Bishop Tamarón passed the ruins of “the house they called Colorada,” and from that point on they began to see pens of ewes, corrals, and small houses (Adams 1953:201). Casa Colorada is also mentioned in the Kendall Journal. Whereas it may have been in ruins in 1760, by 1841 it was a small community. The area is a well known Land Grant.

The modern settlement for the town of Casa Colorada was born of a petition for a community grant in 1823. The grant may not have been confirmed at that time but the town continued in existence (Bowden 1969:II, 205). Testimony in the adjudication of the grant before the Surveyor General confirmed that the town was built in 1822 or 1823 in the place already known by the name Casa Colorado (Town of Casa Colorado Grant:12). It was included in lists of New Mexico towns in 1833 and 1840 (Bloom 1913:14; Carroll and Haggard 1942:93).

Wislizenus only referred to the nearby sand hills and the location of “Casas Coloradas,” six miles south of Tomé, when he camped there on 22 July 1846 (Wislizenus 1848:35). Later in the same year Abert commented on some large ponds north of town which were filled with water birds. His party had reached the Río Grande near there after descending from Abó Pass (Abert 1962:117-118).

In 1855, W.W.H. Davis observed that at Casa Colorada his party “struck a young desert, an excellent pocket edition of the great African Zahara, over which we journeyed for about four miles.” Through the area north of “La Hoya” the sand made travel difficult and the land barren with the exception of “occasional small patches in some of the valleys close to the river” (Davis 1938:200).

In the 1920s the local Post Office was given the name “Turn” because there was a turn in the road at Casa Colorada and that name has since appeared on many maps but the original name is still in general use (Julyan 1996:67).

== Education ==
Casa Colorada's school was an old, abandoned schoolhouse in the community of Casa Colorada, New Mexico. The building, once an active part of the community, now stands abandoned.

== Gallery ==
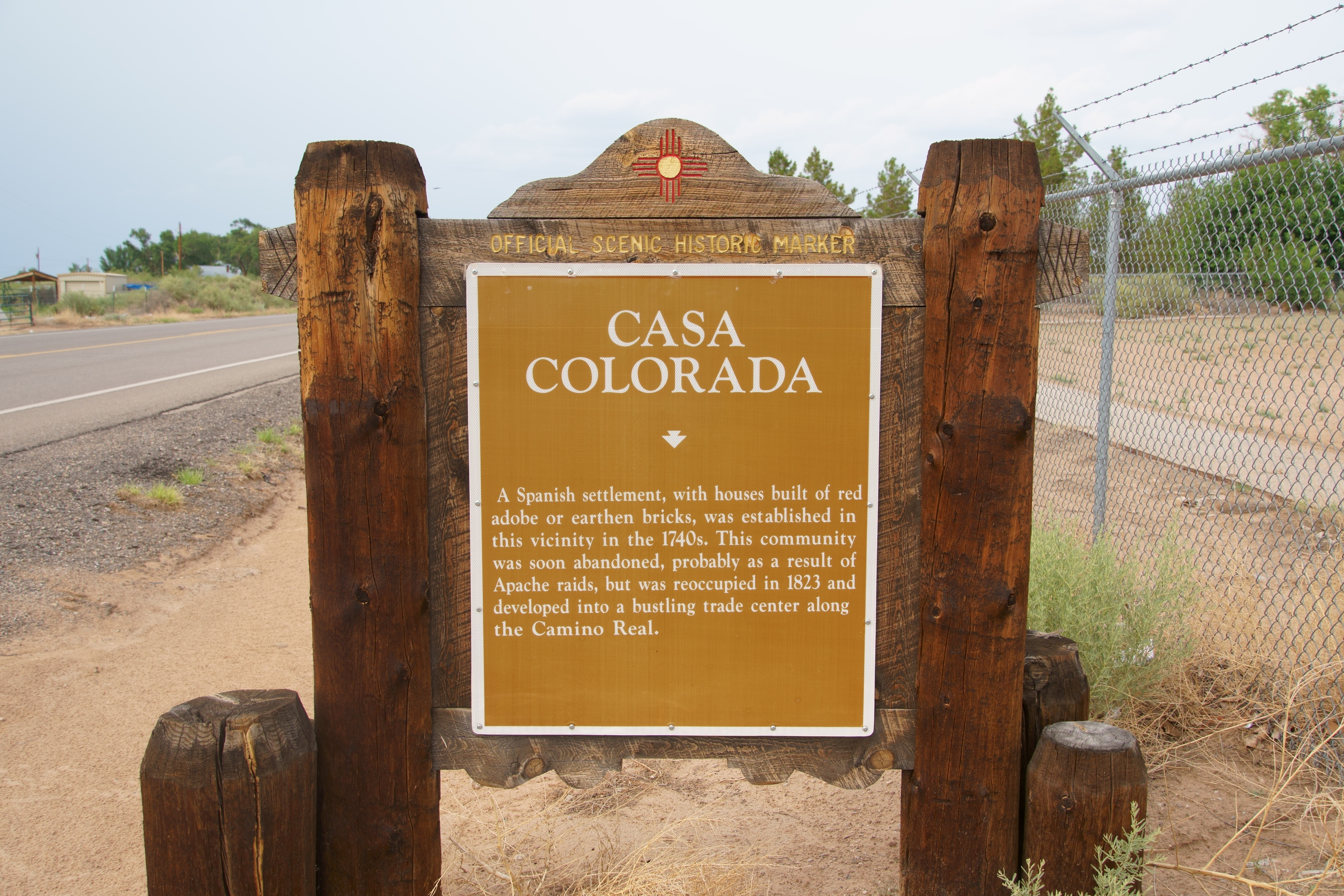
Official Scenic Historic Marker for Casa Colorada, NM
