= La Joya, New Mexico =

- Census-designated place
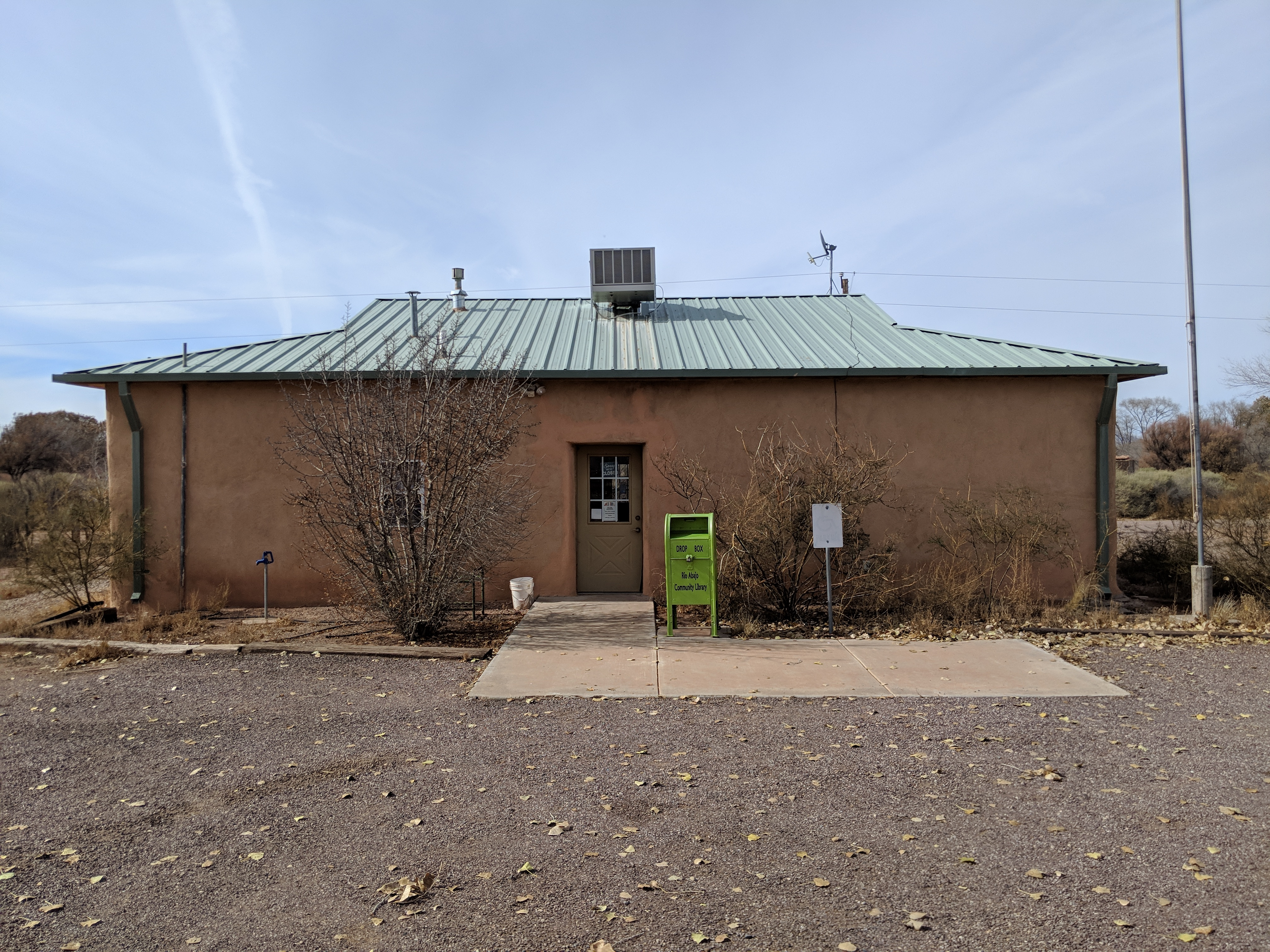
- La Joya Community Center

- Location within New Mexico
- Coordinates: 34°20′42″N 106°50′48″W
- Country: United States
- State: New Mexico
- County: Socorro

Area
  - Total: 0.94 sq mi (2.43 km^{2})
  - Land: 0.94 sq mi (2.43 km^{2})
  - Water: 0 sq mi (0.00 km^{2})
- Elevation: 4,725 ft (1,440 m)

Population (2020)
  - Total: 80
  - Density: 85.3/sq mi (32.95/km^{2})
- Time zone: UTC-7 (Mountain (MST))
  - Summer (DST): UTC-6 (MDT)
- ZIP code: 87028
- Area code: 505
- GNIS feature ID: 2584125

La Joya is a census-designated place in Socorro County, New Mexico, United States. The community is located on the east bank of the Rio Grande, 20 miles (32 km) north of Socorro. As of the 2020 census, La Joya had a population of 80. La Joya has a post office with ZIP code 87028, which opened on February 28, 1883.

== History ==
La Joya was settled in 1598 by the Piro Indians, who built a pueblo at the site.

== Demographics ==
Historical population
| Census | Pop. | Note | %± |
|---|---|---|---|
| 2020 | 80 | | — |
U.S. Decennial Census

== Education ==
Its school district is Belén Consolidated Schools. Belén High School is the district's comprehensive high school.
