= U.S. Route 285 in New Mexico =

Section of U.S. Highway in New Mexico, United States

U.S. Highway 285
- US 285 highlighted in red

Route information
- Auxiliary route of US 85
- Maintained by NMDOT
- Length: 407.0 mi (655.0 km)
- Existed: 1934–present

Major junctions
- South end: US 285 at the Texas state line near Orla, TX
- US 62 / US 180 in Carlsbad; US 82 in Artesia; US 70 / US 380 in Roswell; US 54 / US 60 near Vaughn; I-40 in Clines Corners; I-25 / US 84 / US 85 in Santa Fe; US 64 in Tres Piedras
- North end: US 285 at the Colorado state line near Antonito, CO

Location
- Country: United States
- State: New Mexico
- Counties: Eddy, Chaves, De Baca, Lincoln, Guadalupe, Torrance, San Miguel, Santa Fe, Rio Arriba, Taos

Highway system
- United States Numbered Highway System; List; Special; Divided; New Mexico State Highway System; Interstate; US; State; Scenic
← NM 284	→ NM 286

U.S. Route 285 (US 285) is a north–south U.S. highway that runs from Sanderson, TX to Denver, CO. US 285 enters the state of New Mexico from Texas, into Eddy County, NM just south of Loving. The highway runs through the major cities of Carlsbad, Roswell, and Santa Fe. The highway exits the state into Colorado approximately 25 miles north of Tres Piedras. The Pecos River runs adjacent to the vast stretch of highway, yet breaks away in Northern New Mexico, before entering Colorado.

== Route description ==
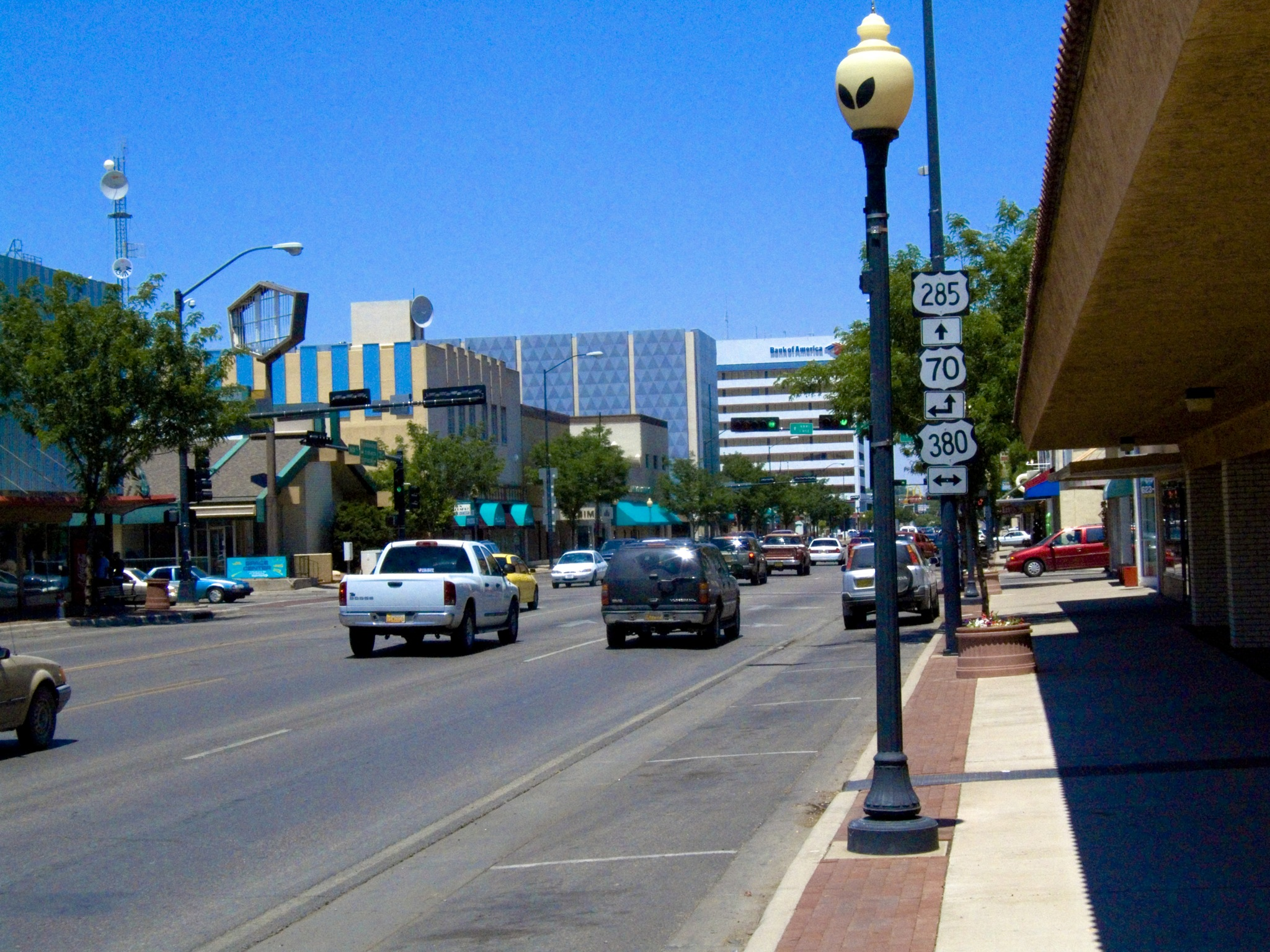
US 285 at the intersection of US 70 and US 380 in Roswell.

US 285 enters New Mexico signed as the Pecos Highway approximately 23 miles south of Loving. As US 285 traverses north it, passes through the towns of Carlsbad, Artesia, and Roswell. In Carlsbad, US 285 runs concurrently with US 62 and US 180 through the south end of town before splitting downtown. In Artesia, the route intersects with US 82. In Roswell, the route intersects with US 70 and US 380, having a short concurrency with US 70.

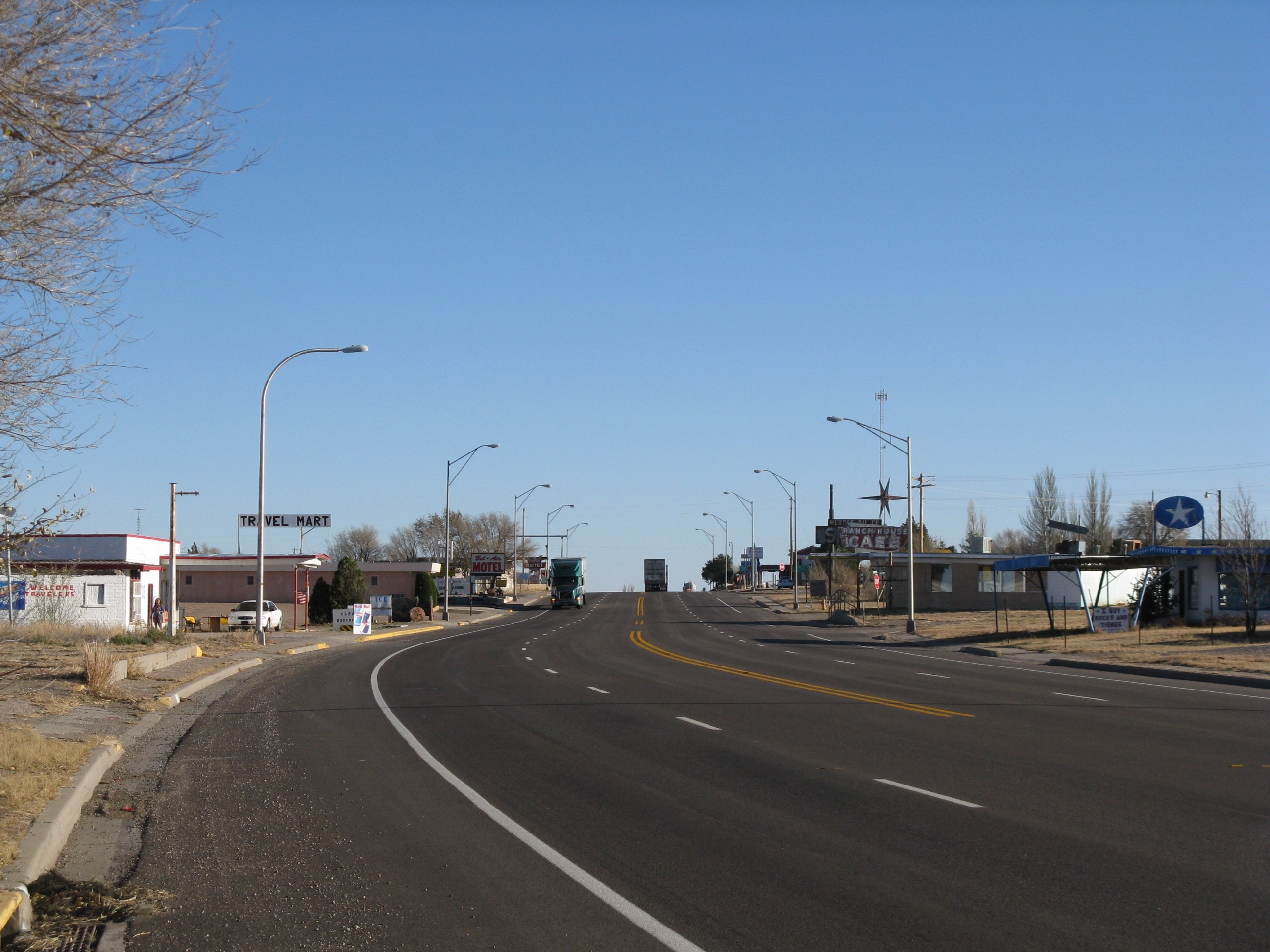
US 54, US 60 and US 285 in Vaughn.

The route next heads northwest to Vaughn, where it has a brief concurrency with US 54 and US 60 through the town, US 60 continues with US 285 until Encino. The route then continues northwest and junctioning with Interstate 40 (I-40) at Clines Corners.

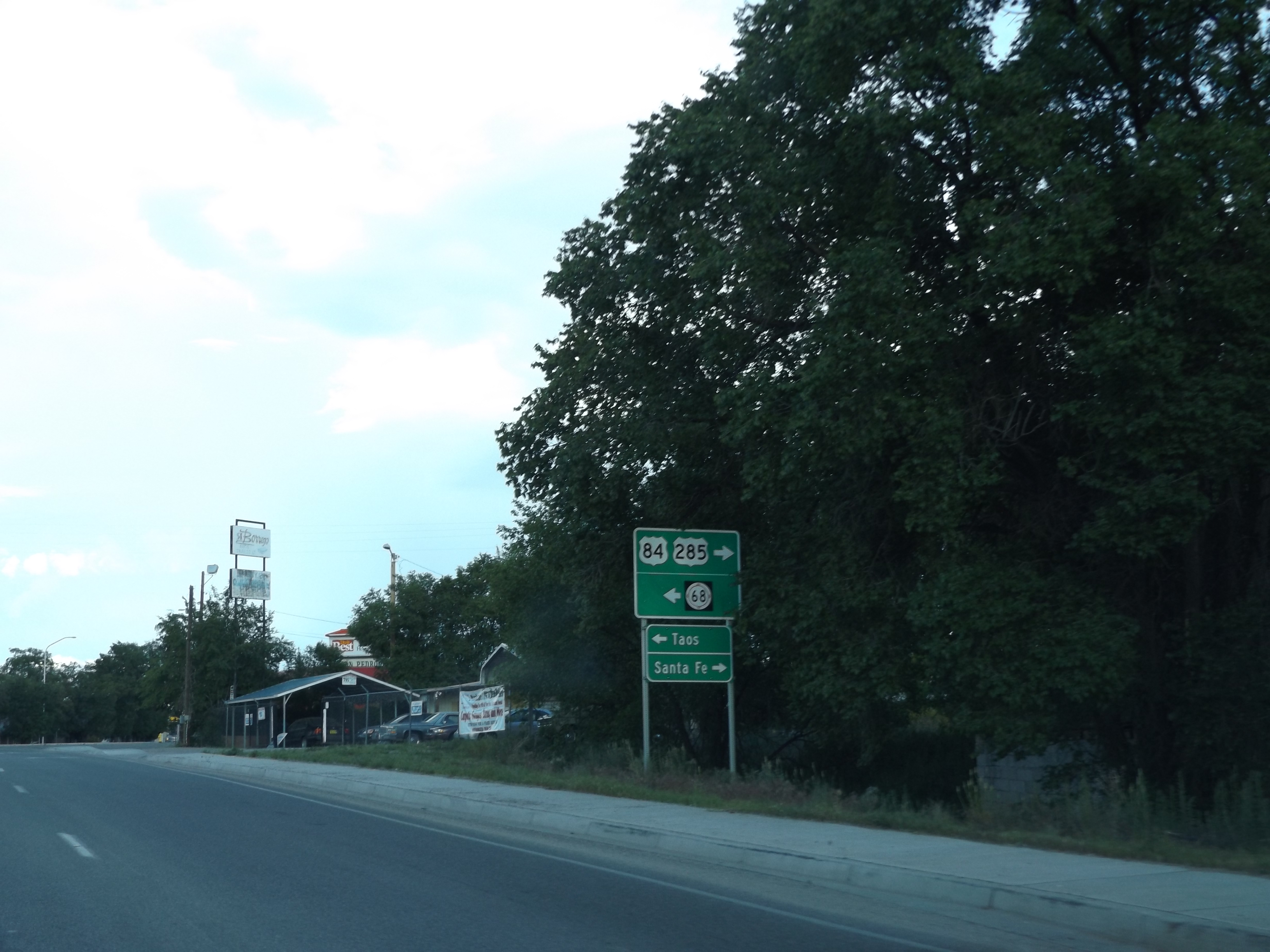
US 285 and US 84 approaching the intersection with NM 68

Heading north out of Clines Corners, the route continues towards the state capital. At the outskirts of Santa Fe, the route becomes concurrent with Interstate 25, US 84, and its unsigned parent US 85 for several miles heading west through the foothills of the Sangre De Cristo Mountains to Santa Fe. After exiting I-25, US 84/US 285 follows Saint Francis Drive through Santa Fe. The route continues north to Española and Chamita, where the concurrency with US 84 ends in Chili. The route then traverses the Carson National Forest, where US 285 now makes a long climb up to the Colorado Plateau, passing through Ojo Caliente as it ascends to the San Luis Valley. After crossing US 64, the highway passes through the village of Tres Piedras, New Mexico at the south end of the valley, then proceeds north to the Colorado border near the Rio Grande del Norte National Monument.

== Major intersections ==
County	Location	mi	km	Exit	Destinations	Notes
Eddy		0.00	0.00		US 285 south – Pecos	Continuation into Texas
Eddy	Loving	21.1	34.0		NM 387 north	Southern terminus of NM 387
Eddy		23.4	37.7		NM 31 north – Hobbs	Southern terminus of NM 31
Eddy		27.3	43.9		NM 216 north (Grandi Road)	Southern terminus of NM 216
Eddy	Carlsbad	31.3	50.4		US 62 / US 180 west – El Paso	South end of US 62/US 180 overlap
Eddy	Carlsbad	32.0	51.5		NM 216 south (Wood Avenue)	Northern terminus of NM 216
Eddy	Carlsbad	32.6	52.5		Plaza Street	Interchange; southbound exit only via San Jose Boulevard
Eddy	Carlsbad	33.1	53.3		NM 524 west (Lea Street)	Eastern terminus of NM 524
Eddy	Carlsbad	33.3	53.6		US 62 / US 180 east – Hobbs	North end of US 62/US 180 overlap
Eddy		41.6	66.9		NM 524 east – Carlsbad	Western terminus of NM 524
Eddy		45.7	73.5		NM 137 south – Queen	Northern terminus of NM 137
Eddy		55.1	88.7		NM 381 east – Brantley Lake	Western terminus of NM 381
Eddy		63.4	102.0		NM 229 north (Four Dinkus Road)	Southern terminus of NM 229
Eddy	Atoka	64.4	103.6		NM 335 east	Western terminus of NM 335
Eddy	Artesia	69.4	111.7		US 82 (Main Street) – Alamogordo, Lovington	
Eddy	Artesia	70.4	113.3		NM 357 east	Western terminus of NM 357
Eddy	Artesia	71.4	114.9		NM 229 south (Mill Road)	Northern terminus of NM 229
Eddy		72.1	116.0		NM 2 north (Lake Arthur Highway) – Hagerman, Dexter	Southern terminus of NM 2
Eddy		77.2	124.2		NM 350	
Eddy–Chaves county line		78.6	126.5		NM 438	
Chaves		86.7	139.5		NM 13 west	Eastern terminus of NM 13
Chaves		102.1	164.3		NM 2 south (Yakima Road) – Dexter, Hagerman	Northern terminus of NM 2
Chaves		105.1	169.1		US 285 Truck north (Relief Route) to US 380 west / US 70 – Roswell International Air Center	Southern terminus of US 285 Truck (Relief Rte.)
Chaves	Roswell	109.7	176.5		US 70 west / US 380 – Mescalero, Capitan, Tatum	South end of US 70 overlap
Chaves	Roswell	113.7	183.0		NM 246 west	Eastern terminus of NM 246
Chaves		115.0	185.1		US 70 east (Clovis Highway) / US 70 Truck west / US 285 Truck south (Relief Route) – Portales, Ruidoso	Interchange; north end of US 70 overlap; US 70 exit B, US 70 Truck exit A; eastern terminus of US 70 Truck, northern terminus of US 285 Truck (Relief Rte.)
Chaves		146.8	236.3		NM 20 north – Fort Sumner	Southern terminus of NM 20
De Baca		166.3	267.6		NM 247 west – Corona	Eastern terminus of NM 247
Lincoln	No major junctions					
Guadalupe		204.7	329.4		US 54 / US 60 east – Santa Rosa, Fort Sumner	South end of US 54/US 60 overlap
Guadalupe		208.6	335.7		US 54 west – Alamogordo, Carrizozo	North end of US 54 overlap
Torrance	Encino	222.2	357.6		NM 3 – Duran, Villanueva	
Torrance	Encino	222.7	358.4		US 60 west – Willard	North end of US 60 overlap
Torrance	Clines Corners	249.4	401.4		I-40 – Albuquerque, Santa Rosa	I-40 exit 218
San Miguel	No major junctions					
Santa Fe		265.7	427.6		NM 34 north – Pecos	Southern terminus of NM 34
Santa Fe		284.0	457.1		NM 41 south – Moriarty	Northern terminus of NM 41
Santa Fe	Eldorado at Santa Fe	290.7	467.8		I-25 north (US 85 north / US 84 east) – Las Vegas	South end of I-25/US 84/US 85 overlap; I-25 exit 290
Santa Fe	Santa Fe	297.1	478.1	284	NM 466 (Old Pecos Trail)	Exit number follows I-25
Santa Fe	Santa Fe	298.4	480.2		I-25 south (US 85 south) – Albuquerque	North end of I-25/US 85 overlap; I-25 exit 282
Santa Fe	Santa Fe	300.0	482.8		NM 466 (St. Michaels Drive) – Santa Fe University of Art and Design	Interchange; serves CHRISTUS St. Vincent Regional Medical Center
Santa Fe	Santa Fe	301.6	485.4		NM 14 south (Cerrillos Road)	Northern terminus of NM 14
Santa Fe	Santa Fe	302.5	486.8		NM 475 east (Paseo de Peralta) – State Capitol	Western terminus of NM 475
Santa Fe	Santa Fe	303.2	488.0		Downtown Plaza	Interchange; southbound exit and northbound entrance
Santa Fe	Santa Fe	303.8	488.9	166	NM 599 south (Santa Fe Relief Route)	Northern terminus of NM 599; south end of freeway; no exit number northbound
Santa Fe	Santa Fe–Tesuque line	306.2	492.8	168	CR 73 north / Opera Drive / Avenida Monte Sereno – Tesuque Village	Southern terminus of CR 73
Santa Fe	Tesuque–Tesuque Pueblo line	308.1	495.8	171	Flea Market Road	
Santa Fe	Tesuque Pueblo	309.2	497.6	172	CR 73 south – Tesuque	Northern terminus of CR 73
Santa Fe		312.3	502.6	175	Camel Rock Road	
Santa Fe	Cuyamungue	313.9	505.2	176	Cuyamungue	
Santa Fe	Cuyamungue	315.3	507.4	177	To CR 89B / CR 89D / Buffalo Thunder Road	North end of freeway
Santa Fe	Pojoaque	317.8	511.4		NM 502 west – Los Alamos	Eastern terminus of NM 502; interchange
Santa Fe	Pojoaque	318.5	512.6		NM 503 east – Cundiyo	Western terminus of NM 503
Santa Fe		320.4	515.6	183	Frontage Road	Interchange
Santa Fe	Sombrillo–Española line	324.5	522.2		NM 399 south / NM 106 north – Sombrillo	Northern terminus of NM 399, southern terminus of NM 106
Rio Arriba	Española	326.1	524.8		NM 68 north (Riverside Drive)	Southern terminus of NM 68
Rio Arriba	Española	326.9	526.1		NM 30 south – Los Alamos	Northern terminus of NM 30
Rio Arriba	Española	328.3	528.3		NM 584 east (Fairview Lane)	Western terminus of NM 584
Rio Arriba		333.3	536.4		NM 74 east	Western terminus of NM 74
Rio Arriba		334.9	539.0		US 84 west – Tierra Amarilla	North end of US 84 overlap
Taos	Ojo Caliente	351.3	565.4		NM 414 north	Southern terminus of NM 414
Taos		353.0	568.1		NM 111 north – La Madera	Southern terminus of NM 111
Taos		361.9	582.4		NM 567 east – Carson	Western terminus of NM 567
Taos	Tres Piedras	382.3	615.3		US 64 – Tierra Amarilla, Taos	
Taos		407.0	655.0		US 285 north – Antonito, Alamosa	Continuation into Colorado
1.000 mi = 1.609 km; 1.000 km = 0.621 mi: Concurrency terminus; Incomplete access

== Roswell truck route ==
U.S. Highway 285 Truck
- Location: Roswell, New Mexico

== Gallery ==
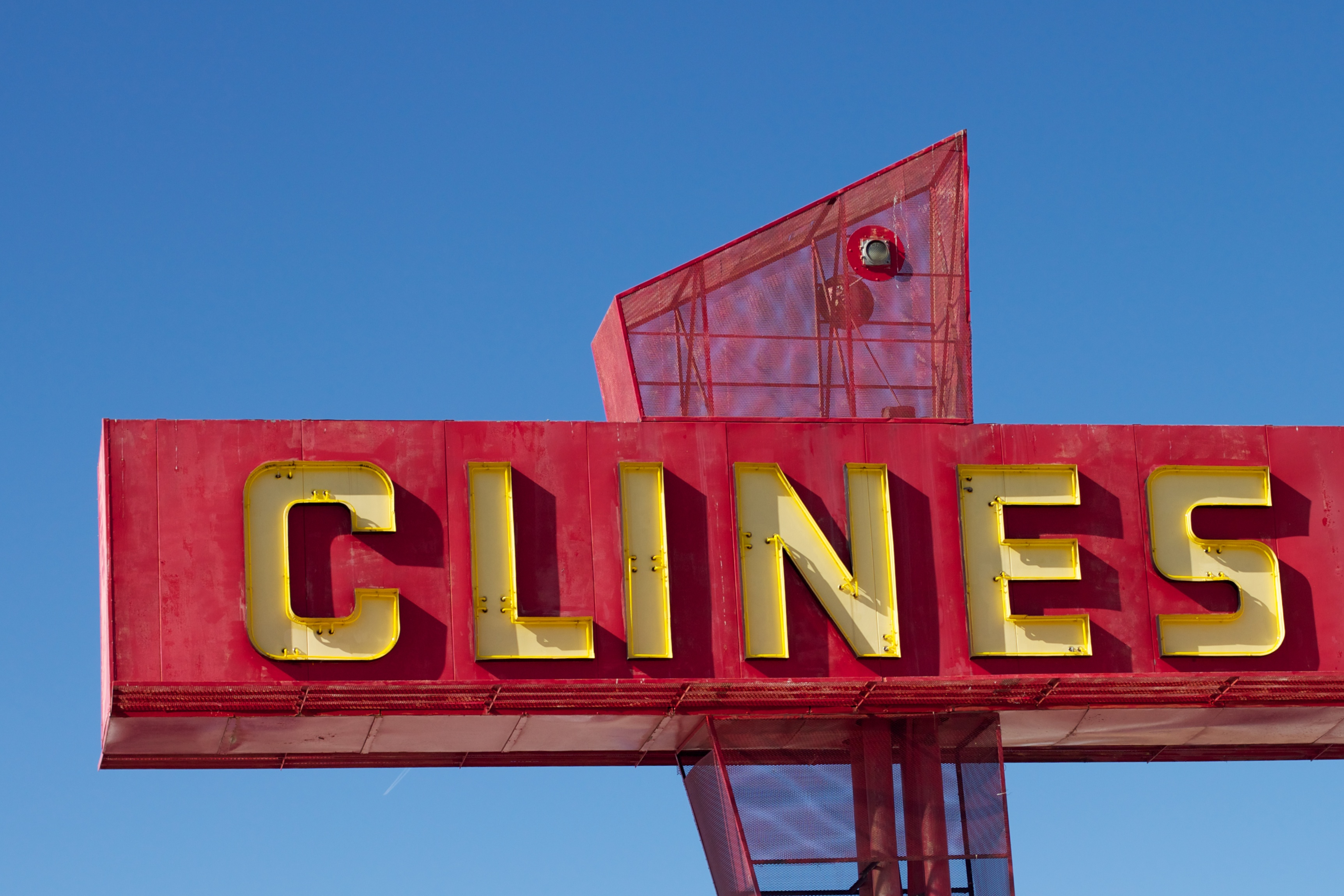
Clines Corners, at the junction of US-285 and I-40, south of Santa Fe

U.S. Route 285
Previous state: Texas	New Mexico	Next state: Colorado
