= New Mexico State Road 2 =

State highway in New Mexico, US

State Road 2
- NM 2 highlighted in red

Route information
- Maintained by NMDOT
- Length: 32.859 mi (52.881 km)

Major junctions
- South end: US 285 near Artesia
- NM 249 in Hagerman; NM 256 near Roswell
- North end: US 285 near Roswell

Location
- Country: United States
- State: New Mexico
- Counties: Eddy, Chaves

Highway system
- New Mexico State Highway System; Interstate; US; State; Scenic
← NM 1	→ NM 3

New Mexico State Road 2 (NM 2) is a state highway in the state of New Mexico. It travels southeast from U.S. Route 285 (US 285), outside of Roswell, New Mexico, passing through Midway. While in Dexter, it turns right as Old Dexter Highway and passes through Greenfield, Hagerman, and Lake Arthur, before ending back at US 285.

== History ==
1926 specification shield for Route 2 and later State Road 2.

Later shield for NM 2, until its replacement by US 285 in the mid 1930s.

Prior to 1927, the Route 2 designation had been applied to a highway from the Texas state line near Carlsbad to Route 1 in Santa Fe. After 1927, State Road 2 ran from the Texas line southeast of Malaga to the Colorado border northeast of Chama. This newer routing replaced the original Route 8 between Santa Fe and Española and Route 36 from Española to Colorado. NM 2 was approximately 425 miles long. In the mid 1930s, it was decommissioned and replaced by US 285. In the early 1950s, US 285 was rerouted south of Roswell. NM 2 was recommissioned along the older routing. US 285 was rerouted again between Roswell and Artesia in the mid 1960s. The older routing was at first designated US 285 Alternate, but was renumbered as an extension of NM 2 by the 1970s. Part of the original US 285 re-alignment south of Roswell was cut off by the mid 1960s extension north of Artesia. This cutoff became a spur of NM 2. During the 1988 Renumbering, NM 2 was truncated. The route north of the spur was renumbered as NM 256 and mainline NM 2 was extended over the spur.

== Major intersections ==
County	Location	mi	km	Destinations	Notes
Eddy		0.000	0.000	US 285 (Roswell Highway) – Artesia, Roswell	Southern terminus
Eddy		5.993	9.645	NM 438 west (East Pearson Road)	Eastern terminus of NM 438
Chaves	Lake Arthur	8.822	14.198	Eleventh Street	Western terminus of former NM 507
Chaves		9.097	14.640	Pueblo Road	Eastern terminus of former NM 557
Chaves	Hagerman	16.412	26.413	East Morgan Street	Eastern terminus of former NM 558
Chaves	Hagerman	16.663	26.816	NM 249 east (East Aberdeen Street) – Maljamar	Western terminus of NM 249
Chaves		18.422	29.647	East Chickasaw Road	Southern terminus of former NM 340
Chaves	Dexter	22.860	36.790	South Lincoln Avenue	Northern terminus of former NM 339
Chaves	Dexter	23.057	37.107	NM 190 east (First Street)	Western terminus of NM 190
Chaves		23.918	38.492	Cherokee Road, East Shawnee Road	Northern terminus of former NM 340, eastern terminus of former NM 560
Chaves		31.058	49.983	NM 256 north (Old Dexter Highway)	Southern terminus of NM 256
Chaves		32.859	52.881	US 285 (Southeast Main Street) – Artesia, Roswell	Northern terminus
1.000 mi = 1.609 km; 1.000 km = 0.621 mi
