= Pastura =

Pastura can refer to:

- Pastura, New Mexico
- Antonio del Massaro, or Antonio da Viterbo, nicknamed il Pastura (ca. 1450–1516), an Italian painter.
- Pastura Bay, a bay on Pag, Croatia
