= New Mexico State Road 172 =

State highway in New Mexico, United States

State Road 172

Route information
- Maintained by NMDOT
- Length: 28.189 mi (45.366 km)

Major junctions
- South end: NM 249 near Maljamar
- North end: US 380 near Roswell

Location
- Country: United States
- State: New Mexico
- Counties: Chaves

Highway system
- New Mexico State Highway System; Interstate; US; State; Scenic
← NM 171	→ NM 173

State Road 172 (NM 172) is a 28.189-mile-long (45.366 km) state highway in the US state of New Mexico. NM 172's southern terminus is at NM 249 north of Maljamar, and the northern terminus is at U.S. Route 380 (US 380) east of Roswell.

== Major intersections ==
The entire route is in Chaves County.

Location	mi	km	Destinations	Notes
	0.000	0.000	NM 249	Southern terminus
	28.189	45.366	US 380	Northern terminus
1.000 mi = 1.609 km; 1.000 km = 0.621 mi
