= New Mexico State Road 219 =

State highway in New Mexico, United States

State Road 219

Route information
- Maintained by NMDOT
- Length: 15.213 mi (24.483 km)

Major junctions
- South end: US 54 in Pastura
- North end: I-40 / US 84 at Vegas Junction

Location
- Country: United States
- State: New Mexico
- Counties: Guadalupe

Highway system
- New Mexico State Highway System; Interstate; US; State; Scenic
← NM 218	→ NM 220

State Road 219 (NM 219) is a 15.213-mile-long (24.483 km) state highway in the US state of New Mexico. NM 219's southern terminus is at U.S. Route 54 (US 54) in Pastura, and the northern terminus is at Interstate 40 (I-40) and US 84 north of Pastura.

== Major intersections ==
The entire route is in Guadalupe County.

Location	mi	km	Destinations	Notes
Pastura	0.000	0.000	US 54	Southern terminus
Vegas Junction	15.213	24.483	I-40 / US 84	Northern terminus
1.000 mi = 1.609 km; 1.000 km = 0.621 mi
