= New Mexico State Road 502 =

State highway in New Mexico, United States

State Road 502
- NM 502 highlighted in red

Route information
- Maintained by NMDOT
- Length: 18.301 mi (29.453 km)

Major junctions
- West end: NM 501 in Los Alamos
- NM 30 in San Ildefonso Pueblo
- East end: US 84 / US 285 in Pojoaque

Location
- Country: United States
- State: New Mexico
- Counties: Los Alamos, Santa Fe

Highway system
- New Mexico State Highway System; Interstate; US; State; Scenic
← NM 501	→ NM 503

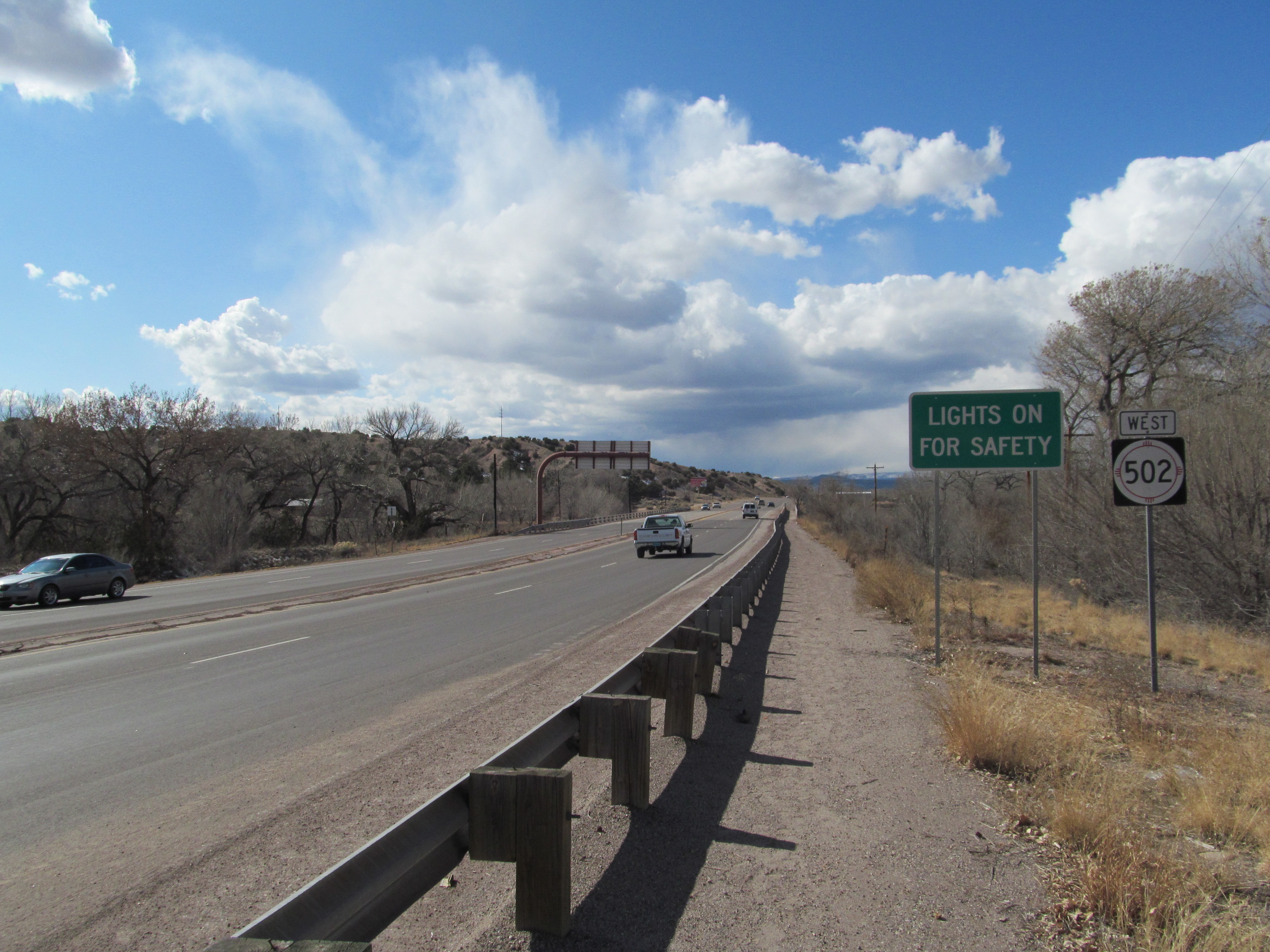
Westbound in Pojoqaue

New Mexico State Road 502 (NM 502) is a 18.301-mile-long (29.453 km) state highway in New Mexico, United States of America. It is notable as the main access route to Los Alamos National Laboratory (LANL), Bandelier National Monument, Valles Caldera National Preserve, Jemez Mountains, and town of Los Alamos.

== Route description ==
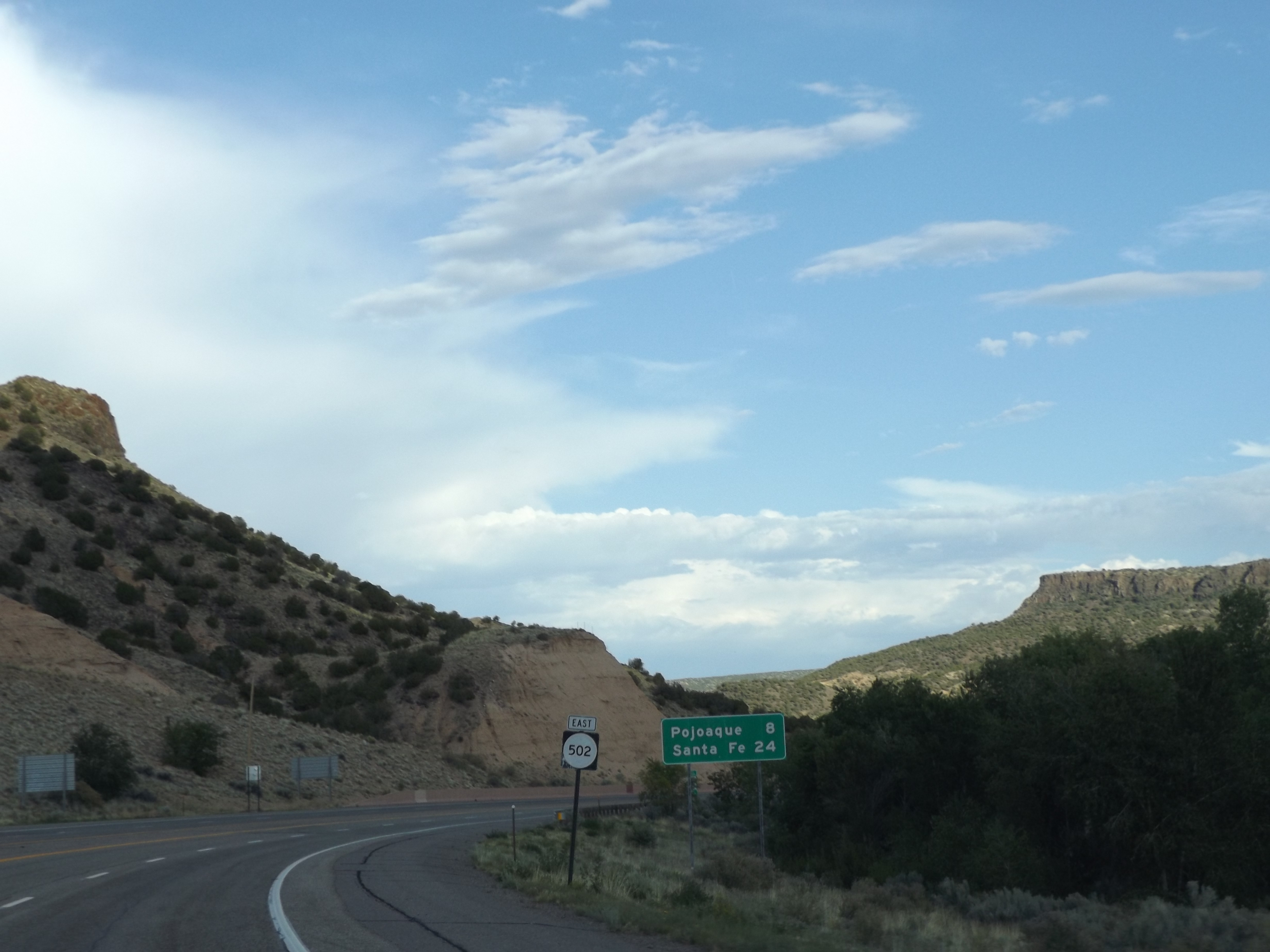
NM 502 eastbound just east of the junction with NM 30

The route is paved for its entire length, in contrast to some other state highways in northern New Mexico. NM 502 begins at its western terminus at NM 501 and heads due east through Los Alamos as Trinity Drive. It also begins as a four-lane road heading through town. As it exits town, it narrows down to two lanes and it then passes by the Los Alamos Airport, running parallel with its runway. It then reaches a junction with NM 4 at an interchange before continuing east with five lanes through the spectacular canyon/mesa country of the Pajarito Plateau. The highway then reaches another junction with NM 30 that goes north to Santa Clara Pueblo and Española. The route becomes a four-lane road and then crosses over the Rio Grande beside the historic Otowi Bridge. The route then passes south of San Ildefonso Pueblo and through El Rancho before reaching its eastern terminus at a single-point urban interchange (SPUI) at U.S. Route 84 (US 84) and US 285 in Pojoaque. The total length is about 18 miles (29 km). NM 502 was formally continuous with NM 501, which continues east from another junction with NM 4 to Los Alamos in the foothills of the Jemez Mountains. NM 502 has been a designated "safety corridor" for most of its length since November 2005, with speed limits restricted to 55 miles per hour (89 km/h) maximum, and lower through the towns and on the steep curves near the intersection with NM 4. Prior to 2007, the speed limit along the stretch from San Ildefonso Pueblo and Pojoaque Valley High School was 65 mph.

Despite Pojoaque being the eastern terminus, Santa Fe is the eastbound control city on NM 502 since traffic typically continues onto US 84 / 285, which does reach Santa Fe.

== Major intersections ==
County	Location	mi	km	Destinations	Notes
Los Alamos	Los Alamos	0.000	0.000	NM 501	Western terminus
Santa Fe		6.110	9.833	NM 4 west – White Rock	Eastern terminus of NM 4
Santa Fe	San Ildefonso Pueblo	10.088	16.235	NM 30 north – Española	Southern terminus of NM 30
Santa Fe	Pojoaque	18.301	29.453	US 84 / US 285 – Santa Fe, Española	Eastern terminus
1.000 mi = 1.609 km; 1.000 km = 0.621 mi
