= New Mexico State Road 190 =

State highway in New Mexico, United States

State Road 190

Route information
- Maintained by NMDOT
- Length: 2.11 mi (3.40 km)

Major junctions
- West end: NM 2 in Dexter
- East end: CR 1 near Dexter

Location
- Country: United States
- State: New Mexico
- Counties: Chaves

Highway system
- New Mexico State Highway System; Interstate; US; State; Scenic
← NM 189	→ NM 191

State Road 190 (NM 190) is a 2.11-mile-long (3.40 km) state highway in the US state of New Mexico. NM 190's western terminus is at NM 2 in Dexter, and the eastern terminus is at County Route 1 (CR 1) route west of Dexter.

== Major intersections ==
The entire route is in Chaves County.

Location	mi	km	Destinations	Notes
Dexter	0.000	0.000	NM 2	Western terminus
	2.110	3.396	CR 1	Eastern terminus
1.000 mi = 1.609 km; 1.000 km = 0.621 mi
