= New Mexico State Road 3 =

State highway in Torrancea and San Miguel counties in New Mexico, United States

State Road 3
- NM 3 highlighted in red

Route information
- Maintained by NMDOT
- Length: 72.401 mi (116.518 km)

Major junctions
- South end: US 54 in Duran
- US 60 / US 285 in Encino; I-40 east of Clines Corners; I-25 / US 85 north of Ribera
- North end: FR 2116 north of Ribera

Location
- Country: United States
- State: New Mexico
- Counties: Torrance, San Miguel

Highway system
- New Mexico State Highway System; Interstate; US; State; Scenic
← NM 2	→ NM 4

New Mexico State Road 3 (NM 3) is a north-south state highway in the state of New Mexico. NM 3's southern terminus is at U.S. Route 54 (US 54) in the small town of Duran, and the northern terminus is at Frontage Road 2116 (FR 2116) north of Ribera.

== Route description ==
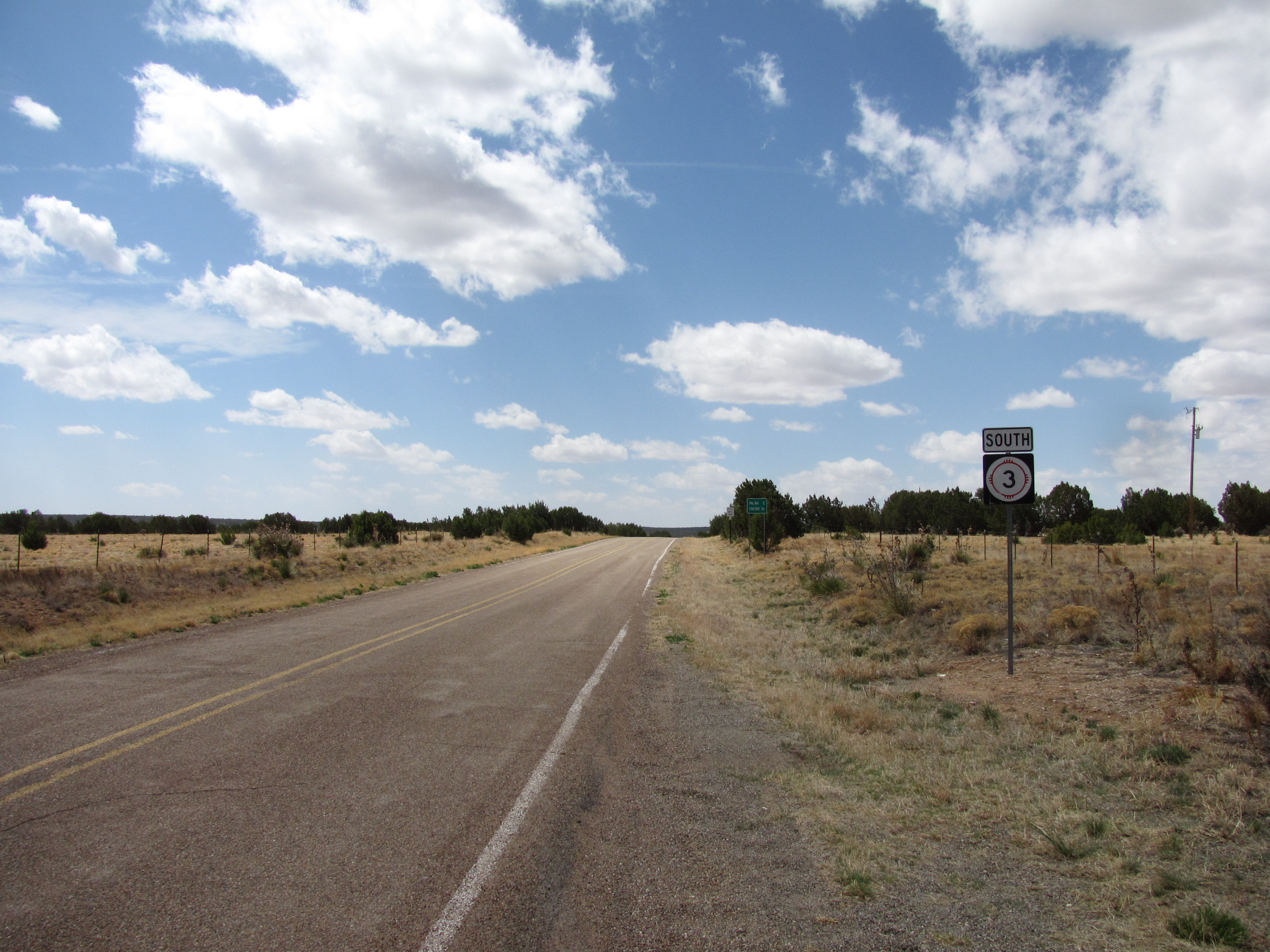
Southbound from I-40

NM 3 begins at its intersection with US 54 in the unincorporated community of Duran. The road travels first in a northwest and then a primarily northern direction for about 14.5 miles (23.3 km) until its junction with US 285 and US 60 in Encino. The road then continues north for 25.5 miles (41.0 km) through largely uninhabited areas to its junction with Interstate 40 (I-40). It then continues in a generally northern direction past exit 323 on I-25 to its northern terminus at FR 2116 north of Ribera. This segment passes through Villanueva State Park, where the road briefly follows the Pecos River.

== Major intersections ==
County	Location	mi	km	Destinations	Notes
Torrance	Duran	0.000	0.000	US 54 – Carrizozo, Santa Rosa	Southern terminus
Torrance	Encino	14.476	23.297	US 60 / US 285 (Shenrick Street) – Fort Sumner, Roswell, Belen, Santa Fe	
Torrance		39.898– 40.004	64.210– 64.380	I-40 – Albuquerque, Amarillo, TX	I-40 exit 230
San Miguel		66.645	107.255	NM 484 south	Northern terminus of NM 484
San Miguel		72.040	115.937	I-25 / US 85 – Santa Fe, Denver, CO	I-25 exit 323
San Miguel		72.401	116.518	FR 2116	Northern terminus
1.000 mi = 1.609 km; 1.000 km = 0.621 mi

== See also ==
- List of state roads in New Mexico
