= New Mexico State Road 249 =

State highway in New Mexico, United States

State Road 249

Route information
- Maintained by NMDOT
- Length: 44.1 mi (71.0 km)

Major junctions
- West end: NM 2 in Hagerman
- East end: US 82 near Maljamar

Location
- Country: United States
- State: New Mexico
- Counties: Chaves, Lea

Highway system
- New Mexico State Highway System; Interstate; US; State; Scenic
← NM 248	→ NM 250

State Road 249 (NM 249) is a 44.1-mile-long (71.0 km) state highway in the US state of New Mexico. NM 249's western terminus is at NM 2 in Hagerman, and the eastern terminus is at U.S. Route 82 (US 82) east of Maljamar.

== Major intersections ==
County	Location	mi	km	Destinations	Notes
Chaves	Hagerman	0.000	0.000	NM 2	Western terminus
Chaves		33.140	53.334	NM 172 north	Southern terminus of NM 172
Lea		44.100	70.972	US 82	Eastern terminus
1.000 mi = 1.609 km; 1.000 km = 0.621 mi
