= New Mexico State Road 484 =

State highway in New Mexico, United States

State Road 484

Route information
- Maintained by NMDOT
- Length: 1 mi (1.6 km)

Major junctions
- South end: CR B31A near Pueblo
- North end: NM 3 near Pueblo

Location
- Country: United States
- State: New Mexico
- Counties: San Miguel

Highway system
- New Mexico State Highway System; Interstate; US; State; Scenic
← NM 483	→ NM 485

State Road 484 (NM 484) is a 1-mile-long (1.6 km) state highway in the US state of New Mexico. NM 484's southern terminus is a continuation of County Route B31A south of Pueblo, and the northern terminus is at NM 3 south of Pueblo.

== Major intersections ==
The entire route is in San Miguel County.

Location	mi	km	Destinations	Notes
Pueblo	0.000	0.000	NM 3	Northern terminus
	1.000	1.609	CR B31A	Southern terminus
1.000 mi = 1.609 km; 1.000 km = 0.621 mi
