= Vaughn Elementary School =

Vaughn Elementary School may refer to:

- Jimmy and Sammy Lane Vaughn Elementary School (Frisco, Texas) of Frisco Independent School District
- Vaughn Elementary School (Vaughn, New Mexico) of Vaughn Municipal Schools

== See also ==
- Max O. Vaughan Elementary School (Allen, Texas) of Allen Independent School District
