= New Mexico State Road 462 =

State highway in New Mexico, United States

State Road 462
- NM 462 highlighted in red

Route information
- Maintained by NMDOT
- Length: 2.474 mi (3.982 km)

Major junctions
- Western end: US 54 near Ancho
- Eastern end: End of state maintenance in Ancho

Location
- Country: United States
- State: New Mexico
- Counties: Lincoln

Highway system
- New Mexico State Highway System; Interstate; US; State; Scenic
← NM 461	→ NM 463

State Road 462 (NM 462) is a 2.474-mile-long (3.982 km) state highway in the US state of New Mexico. NM 462's western terminus is at U.S. Route 54 (US 54) west of Ancho, and the eastern terminus is at the end of state maintenance in Ancho.

== Major intersections ==
The entire route is in Lincoln County.

Location	mi	km	Destinations	Notes
	0.000	0.000	US 54	Western terminus
Ancho	2.474	3.982	End of state maintenance	Eastern terminus
1.000 mi = 1.609 km; 1.000 km = 0.621 mi
