= New Mexico State Road 237 =

State highway in New Mexico, United States

State Road 237
- Bus. Loop US 54

Route information
- Maintained by NMDOT
- Length: 2.410 mi (3.879 km)

Major junctions
- West end: I-40 BL in Tucumcari
- East end: US 54 in Tucumcari

Location
- Country: United States
- State: New Mexico
- Counties: Quay

Highway system
- New Mexico State Highway System; Interstate; US; State; Scenic
← NM 236	→ NM 238

State Road 237 (NM 237) is a 2.410-mile-long (3.879 km) state highway in the U.S. state of New Mexico. Its western terminus is at Interstate 40 Business (I-40 Bus.) in Tucumcari, and the eastern terminus is at U.S. Route 54 (US 54), also in Tucumcari. It also provides the routing for Business Loop US 54.

== History ==
NM 237 is the former routing of US 54, before US 54 was extended further east along Interstate 40 (I-40) from exit 329 to exit 333.

== Major intersections ==
The entire route is in Tucumcari, Quay County.

mi	km	Destinations	Notes
0.000	0.000	I-40 BL (Historic US 66)	Western terminus; road continues as I-40 Bus. west (Historic US 66)
1.222	1.967	NM 104 (First Street)	
2.410	3.879	US 54 to I-40	Eastern terminus
1.000 mi = 1.609 km; 1.000 km = 0.621 mi
