= Pueblo, New Mexico =

- Unincorporated community
- Location within New Mexico
- Coordinates: 35°19′38″N 105°26′07″W
- Country: United States
- State: New Mexico
- County: San Miguel

Area
  - Total: 1.82 sq mi (4.71 km^{2})
  - Land: 1.82 sq mi (4.71 km^{2})
  - Water: 0 sq mi (0.00 km^{2})
- Elevation: 6,073 ft (1,851 m)

Population (2020)
  - Total: 88
  - Density: 48.4/sq mi (18.68/km^{2})
- Time zone: UTC-7 (Mountain (MST))
  - Summer (DST): UTC-6 (MDT)
- Area code: 505
- GNIS feature ID: 2584187

Pueblo is a census-designated place and unincorporated community in San Miguel County, New Mexico, United States. As of the 2020 census, Pueblo had a population of 88. New Mexico State Road 3 passes through Pueblo.

== Geography ==
According to the U.S. Census Bureau, the community has an area of 1.827 square miles (4.73 km^{2}), all land.

== Demographics ==
Historical population
Census	Pop.	Note	%±
2020	88		—
U.S. Decennial Census

== Education ==
It is in the West Las Vegas Schools school district. West Las Vegas High School is the area high school.
