= U.S. Route 54 in New Mexico =

Section of U.S. Highway in New Mexico

U.S. Highway 54
- US 54 highlighted in red

Route information
- Maintained by NMDOT
- Length: 356.176 mi (573.210 km)
- Existed: November 11, 1926–present

Major junctions
- South end: US 54 at Texas state line in El Paso
- US 70 from Alamogordo to Tularosa; US 82 in La Luz; US 380 in Carrizozo; US 60 / US 285 in Vaughn; NM 219 in Pastura; I-40 / US 84 in Santa Rosa; I-40 in Tucumcari
- North end: US 54 at Texas state line near Nara Visa

Location
- Country: United States
- State: New Mexico
- Counties: Otero, Lincoln, Torrance, Guadalupe, Quay

Highway system
- United States Numbered Highway System; List; Special; Divided; New Mexico State Highway System; Interstate; US; State; Scenic
← NM 53	→ NM 55

U.S. Route 54 (US 54) is a part of the U.S. Highway System that travels from Griggsville, Illinois, to El Paso, Texas. In the U.S. state of New Mexico, US 54 extends from the Texas state line by Chaparral, New Mexico, and ends at the Texas state line by Nara Visa, New Mexico. The highway runs for 356.176 miles (573.210 km) in New Mexico. Nationally an east–west route but is signed as a north–south route through the state.

== Route description ==
US 54 enters New Mexico in Chaparral as part of the El Paso, Texas metro area network. It also serves as a military highway to connect Fort Bliss in El Paso to Holloman Air Force Base in Alamogordo, New Mexico, (via US 70). The speed limit is 75 mph on the divided highway section upon entering the state to approximately 10 miles (16 km) south of Alamogordo, with a 35 mph zone in Orogrande. Upon entering Alamogordo, US 54 becomes concurrent with US 70. US 54/US 70 then intersects the beginning of US 82 at the north end of Alamogordo (near La Luz). The limit is 60 mph from Alamogordo to Tularosa and 55 mph north of Tularosa, where the concurrency with US 70 ends, and the highway reverts to being two lanes wide and not divided. After leaving Tularosa the speed limit is 65 mph again. The highway runs north through the central portion of the state, passing through Carrizozo and intersecting US 380. The route then turns northeast before passing through Vaughn. Upon entering Vaughn, the route is briefly concurrent with US 60 and US 285. In Vaughn, US 285 splits off to the south. Exiting Vaughn, US 60 splits off to the southeast, and the route continues northeast to Santa Rosa where it becomes concurrent with Interstate 40. The I-40 concurrency lasts for 59 miles (95 km) to Tucumcari. The highway then exits the state back into Texas at Nara Visa.

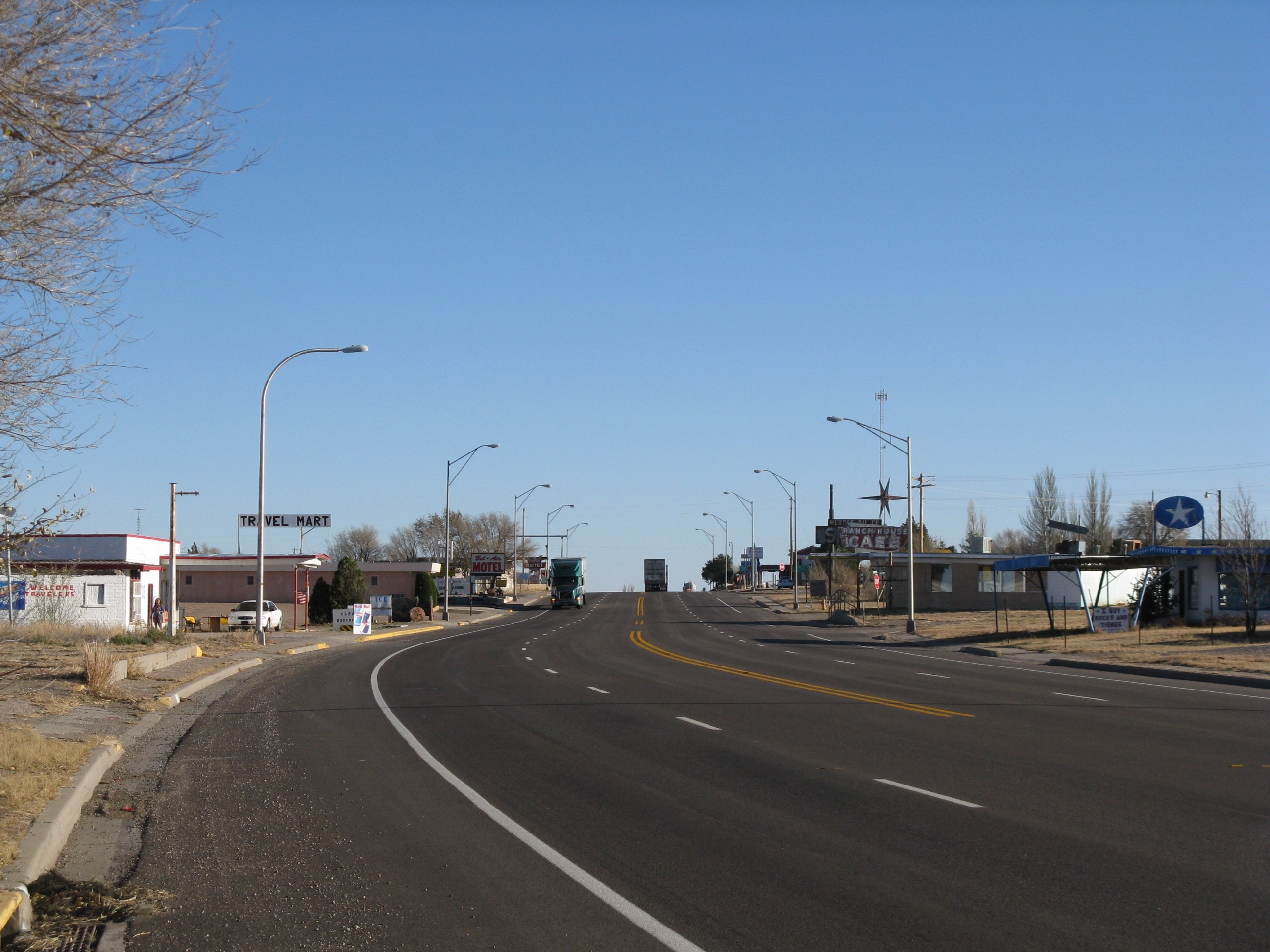
US 54, US 60 and US 285 in Vaughn

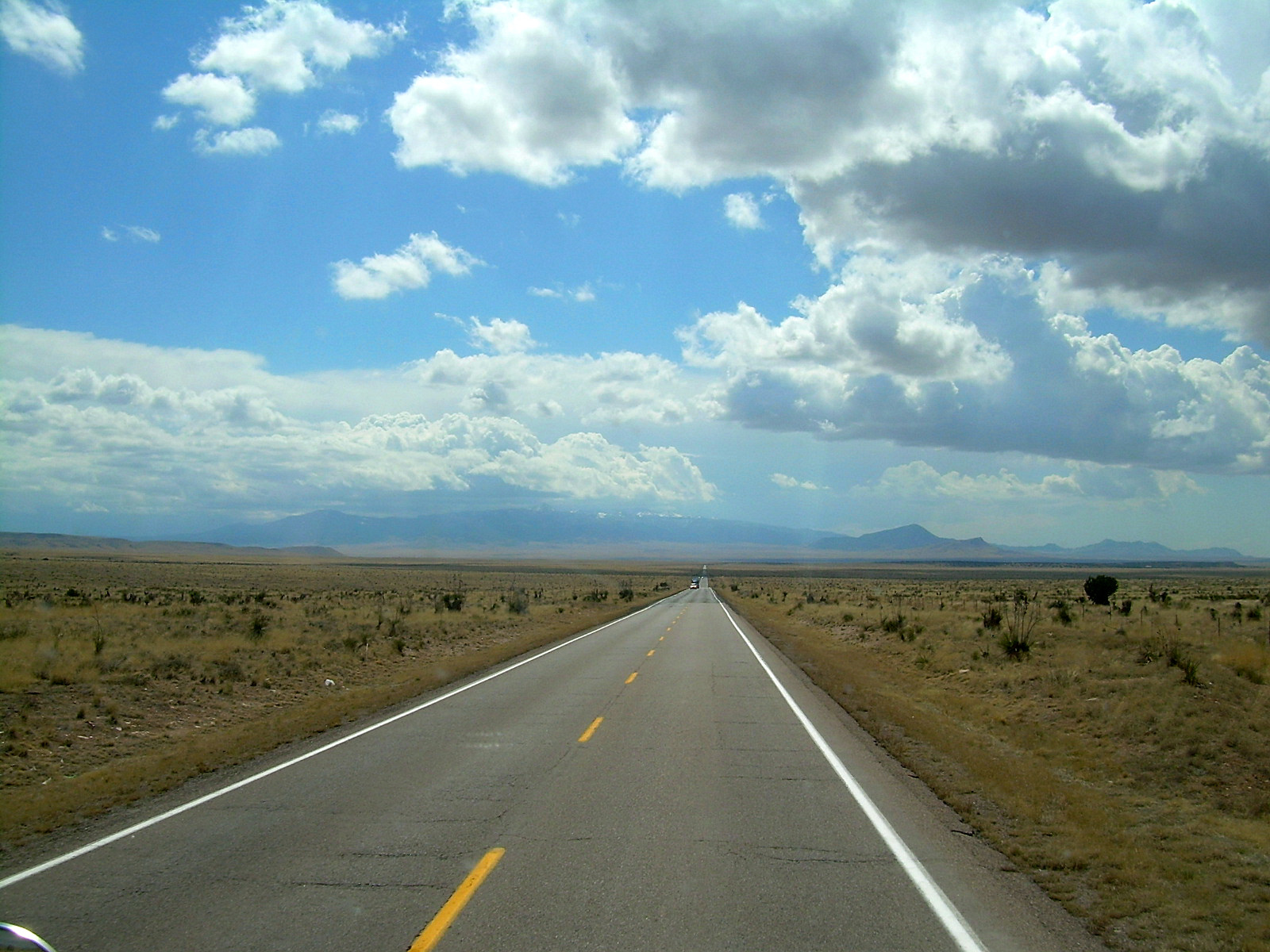
US 54 between Vaughn and Carrizozo

== Major intersections ==
County	Location	mi	km	Exit	Destinations	Notes
New Mexico–Texas line		0.000– 0.04	0.000– 0.064		US 54 west – El Paso	Continuation into El Paso, Texas
New Mexico–Texas line		0.000– 0.04	0.000– 0.064		Bus. US 54 south (Edge of Texas Street)	
Otero		40.620	65.372		NM 506 east	Western terminus of NM 506
Otero	Alamogordo	64.445– 64.68	103.714– 104.09		US 70 west – Las Cruces, Holloman A.F.B., White Sands	Interchange; southern end of US 70 concurrency; northbound access via at-grade connector road
Otero	La Luz	71.770	115.503		US 82 east	Western terminus of US 82
Otero	La Luz	78.661	126.593		NM 545 east	Western terminus of NM 545
Otero	Tularosa	79.328	127.666		US 70 east – Ruidoso, Roswell	Northern end of US 70 concurrency
Lincoln	Carrizozo	123.866	199.343		US 380 – San Antonio, Capitan	
Lincoln		127.070	204.499		NM 349 east	Western terminus of NM 349
Lincoln		135.870	218.662		NM 461 east	Western terminus of NM 461
Lincoln		143.466	230.886		NM 55 north	Southern terminus of NM 55
Lincoln		145.760	234.578		NM 462 east	Western terminus of NM 462
Lincoln	Corona	169.696	273.099		NM 247 east	Western terminus of NM 247
Lincoln	Corona	170.770	274.828		NM 42 north – Willard, Estancia	Southern terminus of NM 42
Torrance	Duran	189.570	305.083		NM 3 north	Southern terminus of NM 3
Guadalupe	Vaughn	201.382	324.093		US 60 west / US 285 north	Western end of US 60/US 285 concurrency
Guadalupe	Vaughn	205.165	330.181		US 285 south	Eastern end of US 285 concurrency
Guadalupe	Vaughn	205.864	331.306		US 60 east	Eastern end of US 60 concurrency
Guadalupe	Pastura	225.124	362.302		NM 219 north	Southern terminus of NM 219
Guadalupe	Santa Rosa	242.751	390.670		I-40 BL / Historic US 66 west to US 84 – Albuquerque, Clines Corners, Las Vegas	Southern end of I-40 Bus./Historic US 66 concurrency
Guadalupe	Santa Rosa	243.091	391.217		NM 91 south – Softball complex, National Guard armory	Northern terminus of NM 91
Guadalupe	Santa Rosa	243.99	392.66		I-40 (US 84) – Albuquerque, Tucumcari	I-40 exit 275
Guadalupe	Santa Rosa	246.62	396.90		I-40 BL / Historic US 66 end / I-40 west / US 84 – Albuquerque, Ft. Sumner	Northern end of I-40 Bus./Historic US 66 concurrency; western end of I-40 concurrency; eastern terminus of I-40 Bus./Historic US 66; I-40 exit 277
Guadalupe		254.39	409.40	284	Frontier Museum	Exit numbers follow I-40
Guadalupe	Cuervo	261.04	420.10	291	Cuervo	
Guadalupe	Newkirk	269.70	434.04	300	NM 129 north – Newkirk	Southern terminus of NM 129
Quay	Montoya	281.15	452.47	311	Montoya	
Quay	Palomas	291.56	469.22	321	Palomas	
Quay	Tucumcari	298.86	480.97	329	I-40 BL / Historic US 66 east	Western terminus of I-40 Bus./Historic US 66
Quay	Tucumcari	300.73	483.98	331	Camino del Coronado	
Quay	Tucumcari	301.88	485.83	332	NM 209 to NM 104 (1st Street)	
Quay	Tucumcari	303.232	488.005		I-40 east – Amarillo	Eastern end of I-40 concurrency, I-40 exit 333
Quay	Tucumcari	304.322	489.759		Historic US 66 (I-40 BL) to NM 209 / NM 104	
Quay	Tucumcari	304.909	490.703		NM 237 / Bus. Loop US 54 (Main Street)	Eastern terminus of NM 237/Bus. Loop US 54
Quay		325.542	523.909		NM 552 west	Eastern terminus of NM 552
Quay		325.556	523.932		NM 469 south	Northern terminus of NM 469
Quay	Logan	327.317	526.766		NM 540 west	Eastern terminus of NM 540
Quay	Logan	327.655	527.310		NM 39 north	Southern terminus of NM 39
Quay	Nara Visa	351.734	566.061		NM 402 north	Southern terminus of NM 402
Quay		356.176	573.210		US 54 east – Dalhart	Continuation into Texas
1.000 mi = 1.609 km; 1.000 km = 0.621 mi: Concurrency terminus

== Tucumcari business loop ==
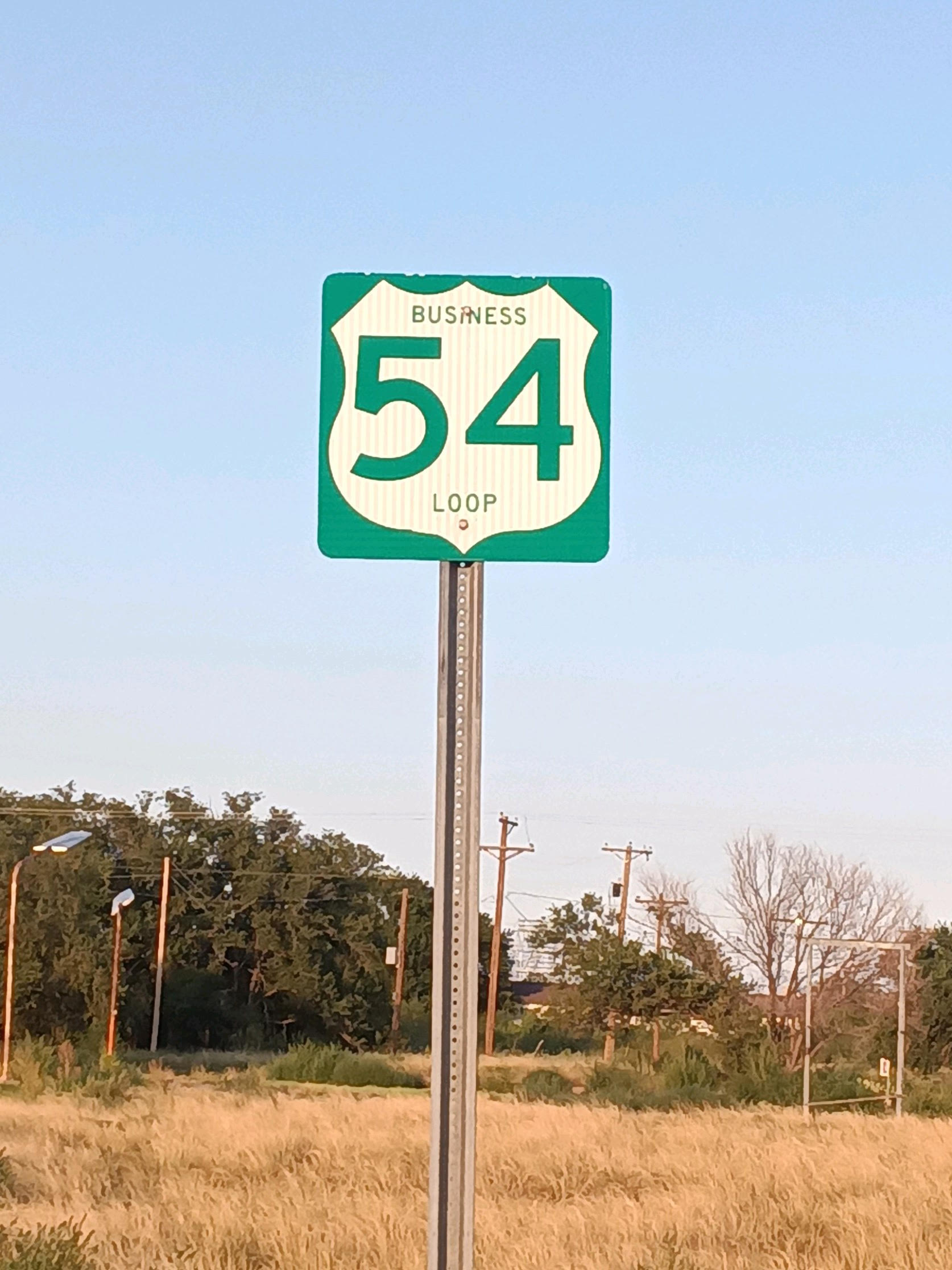
Special highway shield for Business Loop 54 in New Mexico

U.S. Route 54 has one business route in New Mexico. It is located in Tucumcari, concurrent with NM 237. Business Loop US 54 uses a special green-and-white shield to denote its routing. This shield can be seen along NM 237; but along the other highways that it intersects, the business route is unsigned, except at NM 104 (First Street).

U.S. Route 54
Previous state: Texas	New Mexico	Next state: Texas
