= New Mexico State Road 438 =

Highway in New Mexico

State Road 438

Route information
- Maintained by NMDOT
- Length: 10.016 mi (16.119 km)

Major junctions
- West end: Pearson Road near Artesia
- US 285
- East end: NM 2 near Artesia

Location
- Country: United States
- State: New Mexico
- Counties: Chaves, Eddy

Highway system
- New Mexico State Highway System; Interstate; US; State; Scenic
← NM 436	→ NM 439

State Road 438 (NM 438) is a 10.016-mile-long (16.119 km) state highway in the US state of New Mexico. NM 438's western terminus is at the end of state maintenance where it continues west as Pearson Road northwest Artesia, and the eastern terminus is at NM 2 north of Artesia.

== Major intersections ==
County	Location	mi	km	Destinations	Notes
Eddy		0.000	0.000	NM 2	Eastern terminus
Chaves		5.008	8.060	US 285	
Chaves		10.016	16.119	Pearson Road	Western terminus, continues as Pearson Road
1.000 mi = 1.609 km; 1.000 km = 0.621 mi
