= New Mexico State Road 30 =

State highway in New Mexico, United States

State Road 30
- NM 30 highlighted in red

Route information
- Maintained by NMDOT
- Length: 8.949 mi (14.402 km)

Major junctions
- South end: NM 502 in San Ildefonso Pueblo
- North end: US 84 / US 285 in Española

Location
- Country: United States
- State: New Mexico
- Counties: Santa Fe

Highway system
- New Mexico State Highway System; Interstate; US; State; Scenic
← NM 29	→ NM 31

New Mexico State Road 30 (NM 30) is a 8.949-mile-long (14.402 km) state highway in the U.S. state of New Mexico maintained by the New Mexico Department of Transportation (NMDOT). The nearly nine-mile (14 km) road, located in northeastern Santa Fe County, begins NM 502 in San Ildefonso Pueblo and runs northward to the combined routes of U.S. Route 84 (US 84) and U.S. Route 285 (US 285) in Española.

== Route description ==
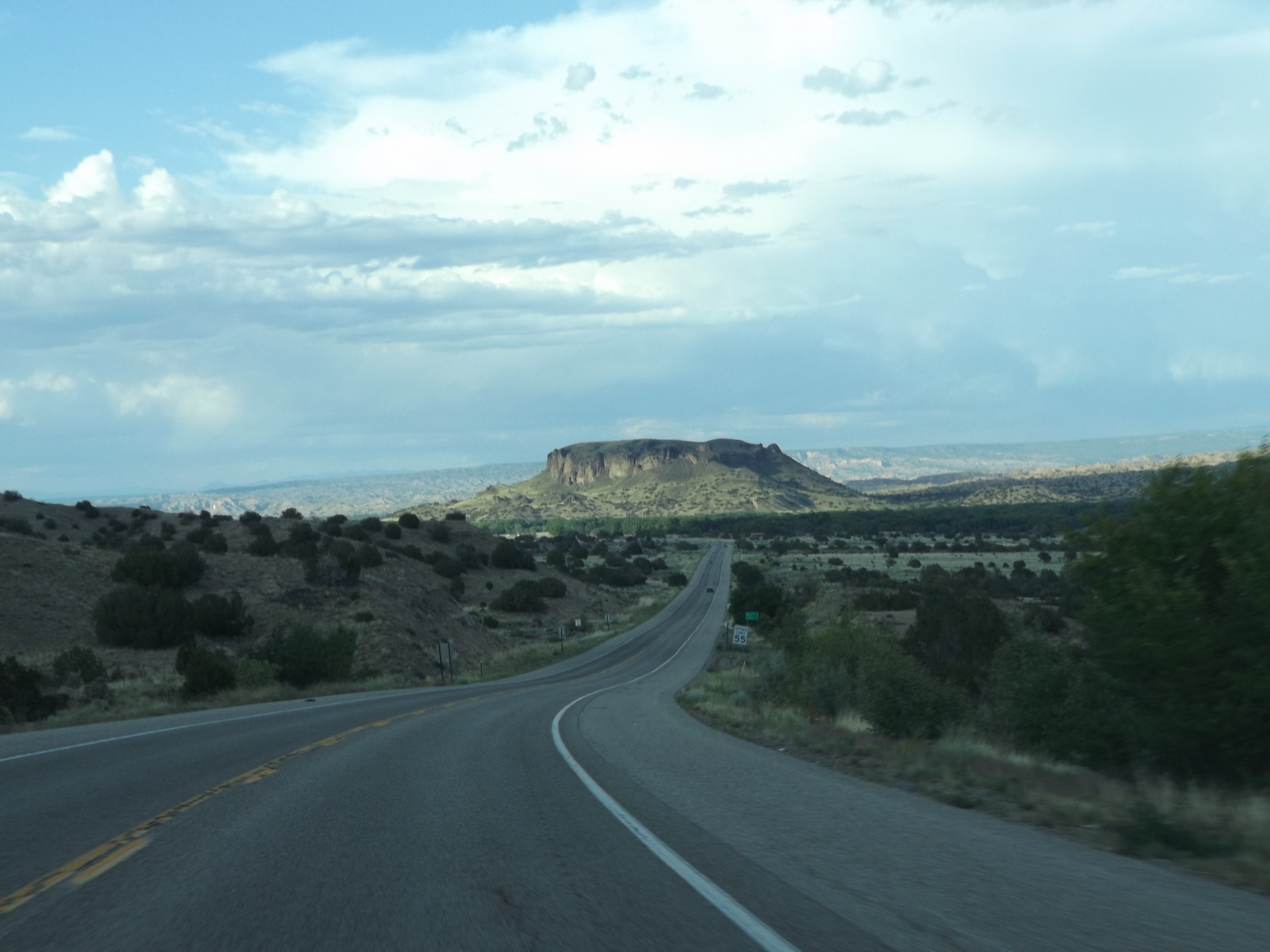
NM 30

NM 30 begins as a two-lane road along NM 502 in San Ildefonso Pueblo. The road travels through San Ildefonso tribal land about half its length, then passes through Santa Clara Pueblo. The road enters Española as Los Alamos Highway and becomes a four-lane divided street as it turns to the north along the rest of its route terminating at US 84 / US 285 along the east side of the Plaza de Española.

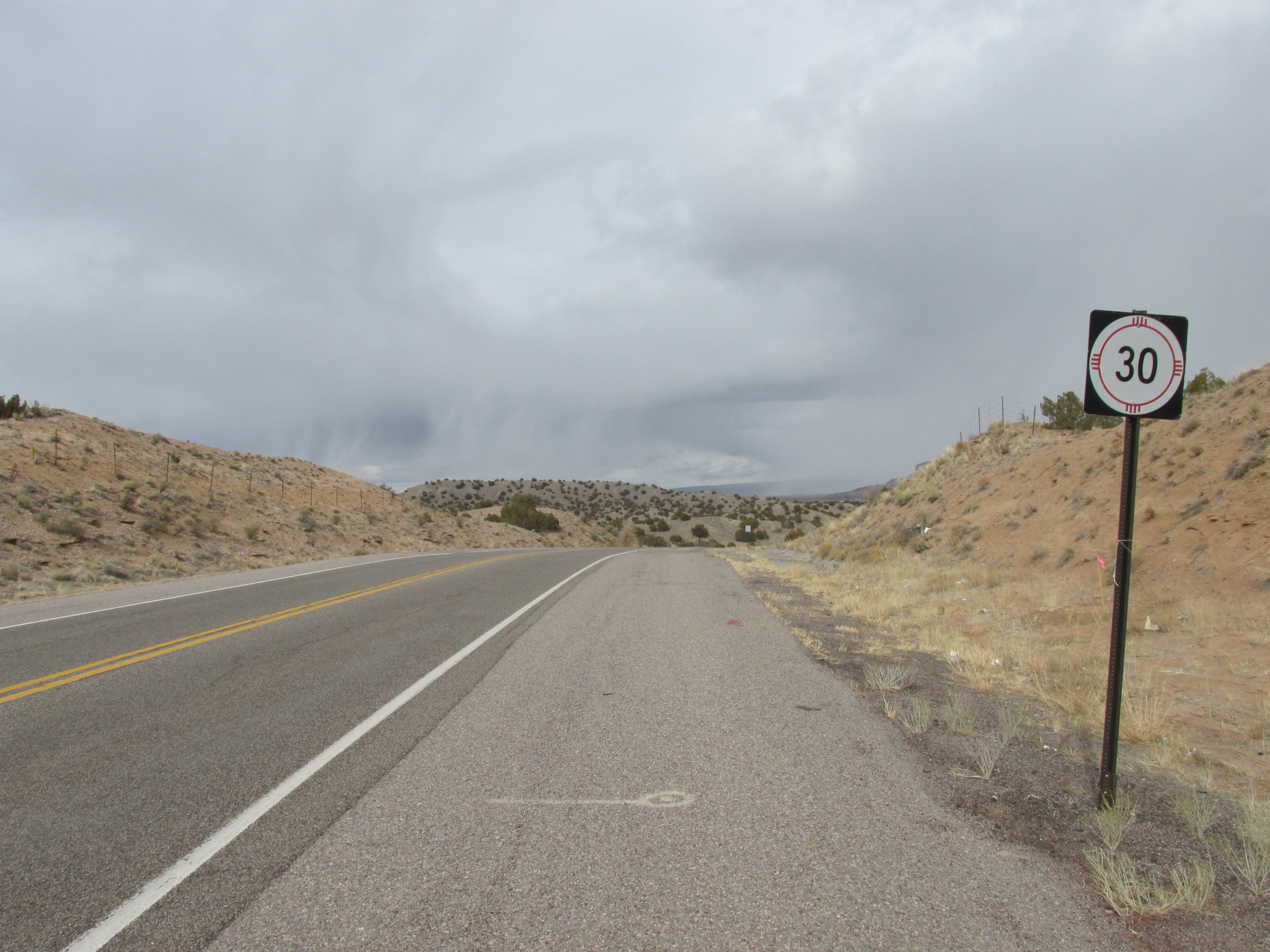
NM 30 northbound near San Ildefonso Pueblo

== Major intersections ==
The entire route is in Santa Fe County.

Location	mi	km	Destinations	Notes
San Ildefonso Pueblo	0.000	0.000	NM 502 – Los Alamos, Pojoaque	Southern terminus
Española	8.949	14.402	US 84 (Paseo de Oñate) / US 285 – Santa Fe, Tierra Amarilla, Antonito	Northern terminus
1.000 mi = 1.609 km; 1.000 km = 0.621 mi

== See also ==
- List of state roads in New Mexico
