= New Mexico State Road 501 =

State highway in New Mexico, United States

State Road 501
- NM 501 highlighted in red

Route information
- Maintained by NMDOT
- Length: 7.323 mi (11.785 km)

Major junctions
- West end: NM 4 near Los Alamos
- East end: Ridgeway Drive near Los Alamos

Location
- Country: United States
- State: New Mexico
- Counties: Los Alamos

Highway system
- New Mexico State Highway System; Interstate; US; State; Scenic
← NM 500	→ NM 502

State Road 501 (NM 501) is a 7.323-mile-long (11.785 km) state highway in New Mexico, United States of America. NM 501's western terminus is at NM 4 west of Los Alamos. It runs northeast into the town of Los Alamos, where it ends. It passes through the territory of Los Alamos National Laboratory (LANL), which is closed to the public (the public may drive through on NM 501). Guard posts are at either end of the LANL section of the highway, and motorists passing into (but not out of) LANL territory must pause at the posts and be waved through. Under most conditions, no inspections, etc., are performed at the guard posts, but heightened security postures at LANL may lead to more intrusive checks.

NM 501 is part of the Jemez Mountain Trail National Scenic Byway. Note that the cited reference erroneously describes this segment as highway 502, not 501, in conflict with reference 1. NM 502 is a related but distinct highway that runs east from Los Alamos to a junction with NM 4 and then to the town of Pojoaque. NM 501 and NM 502 together were formerly known as "Business Route 4," as together they formed a business route through Los Alamos, which was bypassed by NM 4.

== Major intersections ==
The entire route is in Los Alamos County.

Location	mi	km	Destinations	Notes
	0.000	0.000	NM 4	Western terminus
	6.513	10.482	NM 502 east	Western terminus of NM 502
	7.323	11.785	Ridgeway Drive	Eastern terminus
1.000 mi = 1.609 km; 1.000 km = 0.621 mi
