= Duran, New Mexico =

- Census-designated place
- Location within New Mexico
- Coordinates: 34°27′49″N 105°22′50″W
- Country: United States
- State: New Mexico
- County: Torrance

Area
  - Total: 4.69 sq mi (12.15 km^{2})
  - Land: 4.69 sq mi (12.15 km^{2})
  - Water: 0 sq mi (0.00 km^{2})
- Elevation: 6,221 ft (1,896 m)

Population (2020)
  - Total: 44
  - Density: 9.4/sq mi (3.62/km^{2})
- Time zone: UTC-7 (Mountain (MST))
  - Summer (DST): UTC-6 (MDT)
- Area code: 575
- GNIS feature ID: 2584090

Duran is a census-designated place in Torrance County, New Mexico, United States. Duran is located at the junction of U.S. Route 54 and New Mexico State Road 3, 14 miles (23 km) southwest of Vaughn. As of the 2020 census, Duran had a population of 44.

== History ==
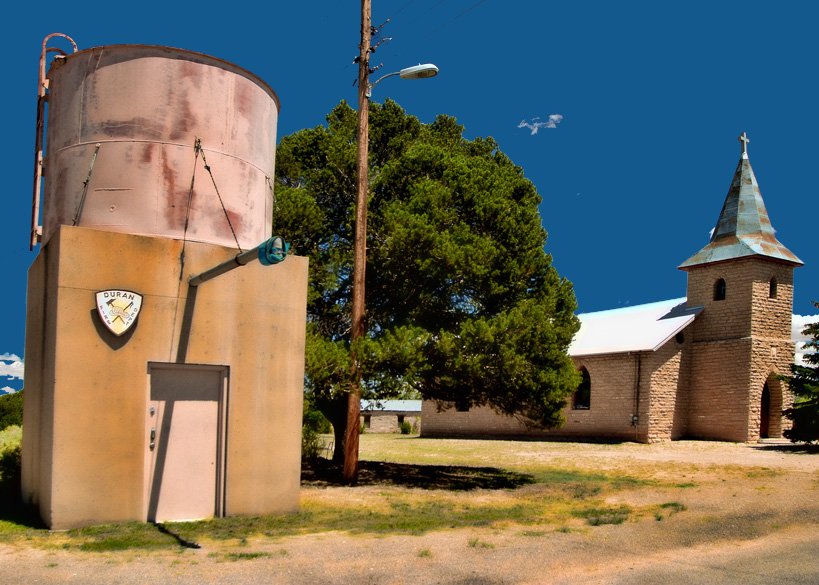
Water tower and church

Duran was laid out in 1902 when the railroad was extended to that point. A post office has been in operation at Duran since 1902.

== Education ==
Vaughn Municipal Schools is the local school district.

== Demographics ==
Historical population
Census	Pop.	Note	%±
2020	44		—
U.S. Decennial Census
