= U.S. Route 285 =

North–south highway through the US states of Texas, New Mexico and Colorado

U.S. Route 285
- US 285 highlighted in red

Route information
- Auxiliary route of US 85
- Length: 846 mi (1,362 km)
- Existed: 1934–present

Major junctions
- South end: US 90 near Sanderson, TX
- I-10 / US 67 / US 385 at Fort Stockton, TX; I-20 at Pecos, TX; US 62 / US 180 at Carlsbad, NM; US 70 at Roswell, NM; US 54 / US 60 near Vaughn, NM; I-40 at Clines Corners, NM; I-25 / US 84 / US 85 near Santa Fe, NM; US 50 at Poncha Springs, CO; US 24 from Johnson Village to Hartsel, CO; US 85 in Denver, CO
- North end: I-25 / US 87 / SH 30 at Denver, CO

Location
- Country: United States
- States: Texas, New Mexico, Colorado

Highway system
- United States Numbered Highway System; List; Special; Divided

U.S. Route 285 is a north–south United States highway, running 846 miles (1,362 km) through the states of Texas, New Mexico and Colorado. The highway's southern terminus is in Sanderson, Texas at an intersection with U.S. Route 90. US 285 has always had an endpoint in Denver, Colorado, although the original US 285 went north from Denver (that segment is now a part of U.S. Route 287). Today the highway's northern terminus is in Denver, at exit 201 on Interstate 25.

US 285 is a secondary route of US 85, which it crosses in metro Denver, and technically crosses again in Santa Fe, New Mexico (today its parent route is largely concurrent with Interstate 25 through New Mexico, and as a result US 85 is no longer signed in New Mexico). US 285 also intersects a sibling route, US 385, in Fort Stockton, Texas.

== Route description ==
Lengths
	mi	km
TX	170	274
NM	412	663
CO	264	425
Total	846	1362

=== Texas ===
The southern terminus of US 285 is at U.S. 90 in Sanderson. Proceeding northward, it crosses I-10 at Fort Stockton, then meets I-20 at Pecos on its way to New Mexico.

=== New Mexico ===
As 285 traverses north on the eastern plains of New Mexico, it passes through Carlsbad, Artesia and then Roswell. In Artesia the route intersects with U.S. Route 82. In Roswell, the route intersects with U.S. Route 70 and U.S. Route 380. The route next heads northwest to Vaughn where it has a brief concurrency with U.S. Route 54 and U.S. Route 60. The route then continues northwest and has a junction with Interstate 40 at Clines Corners.

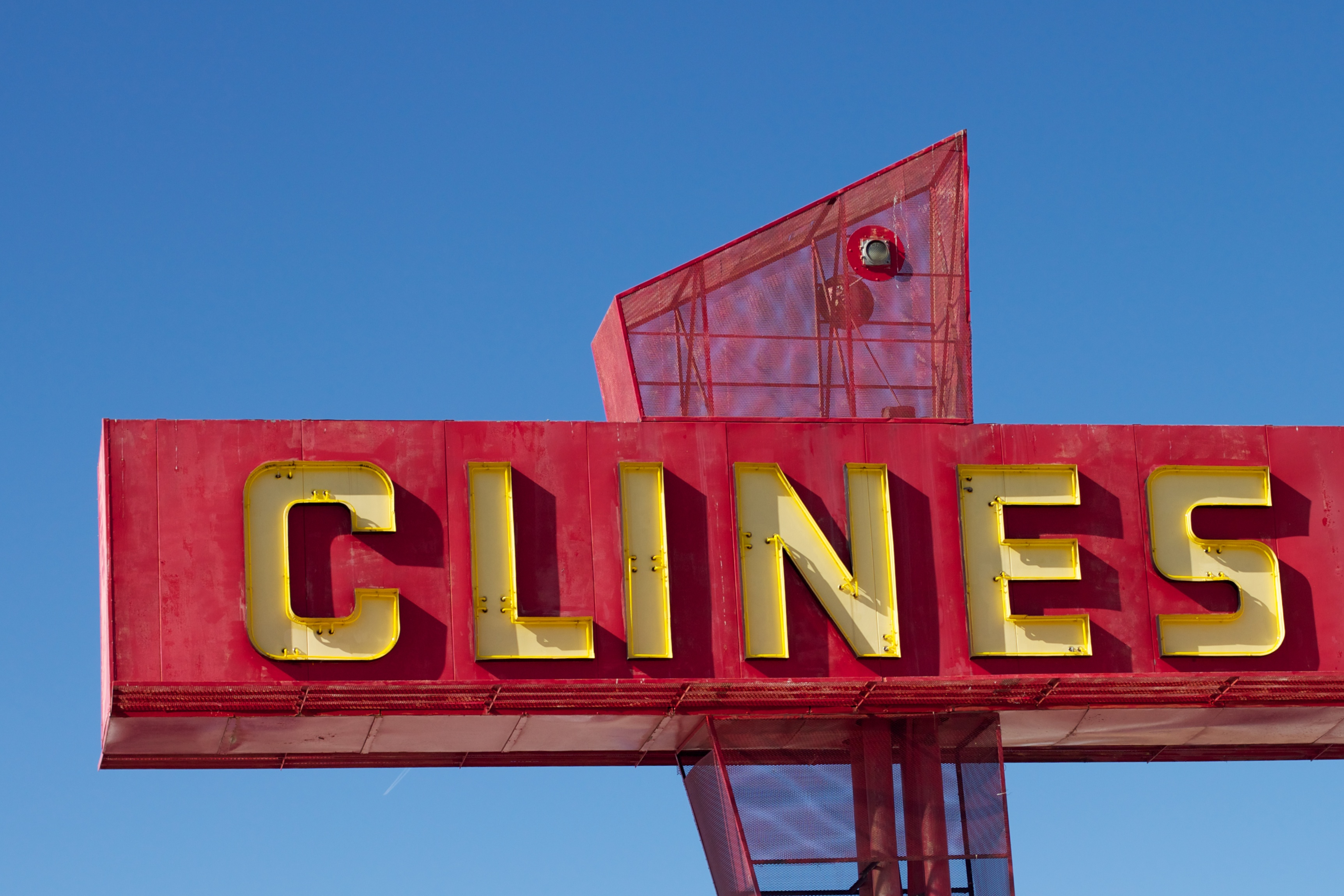
Clines Corners, at the junction of US-285 and I-40, south of Santa Fe

Heading north out of Clines Corners, the route continues towards the state capital. At the outskirts of Santa Fe, the route becomes concurrent with I-25, U.S. Route 84, and its unsigned parent (U.S. Route 85) for several miles heading west through the foothills of the Sangre De Cristo Mountains to Santa Fe. After exiting I-25, US 285 follows Saint Francis Drive through Santa Fe. The route continues north by northwest to Española and Chamita, where the concurrency with US 84 ends. The route then traverses the Carson National Forest where 285 now makes a long climb up to the Colorado Plateau, passing through Ojo Caliente as it ascends to the San Luis Valley. After crossing US 64, the highway passes through the village of Tres Piedras, New Mexico at the south end of the valley, then proceeds north to the Colorado border.

On March 7, 2019, the Legislature of the State of New Mexico, in a unanimous vote, named the 27 mile section between Clines Corners and Encino the "Representative Lorenzo "Larry" Larrañaga Corridor".

=== Colorado ===
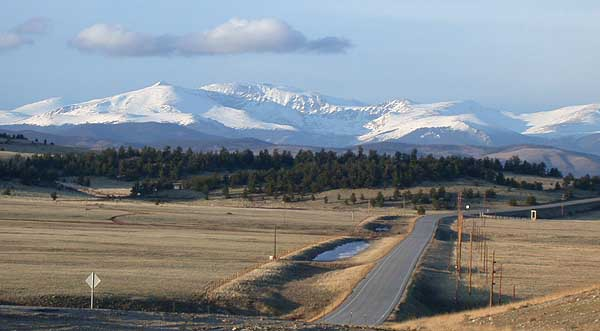
View of South Park along U.S. Highway 285 looking east toward the Front Range

Heading north from the Colorado border, US 285 passes through the main part of the San Luis Valley, eventually reaching Alamosa.

The route separates from US 160 at Monte Vista, where it heads due north along an uncommonly straight 33 mile section known to locals as the “Gun Barrel,” ending at Saguache.

The highway turns briefly east from Saguache, but it bends around north and begins to ascend to the northern end of the valley, eventually climbing over Poncha Pass, elevation 9,012 feet (2,747 m), then dropping sharply down the other side into the Arkansas River Valley.

The highway brushes Salida and follows the Arkansas River north up the valley, then takes a sharp eastward turn just before the small town of Buena Vista. 285 then climbs over Trout Creek Pass, elevation 9,346 feet (2,849 m), and enters the high-altitude South Park basin.

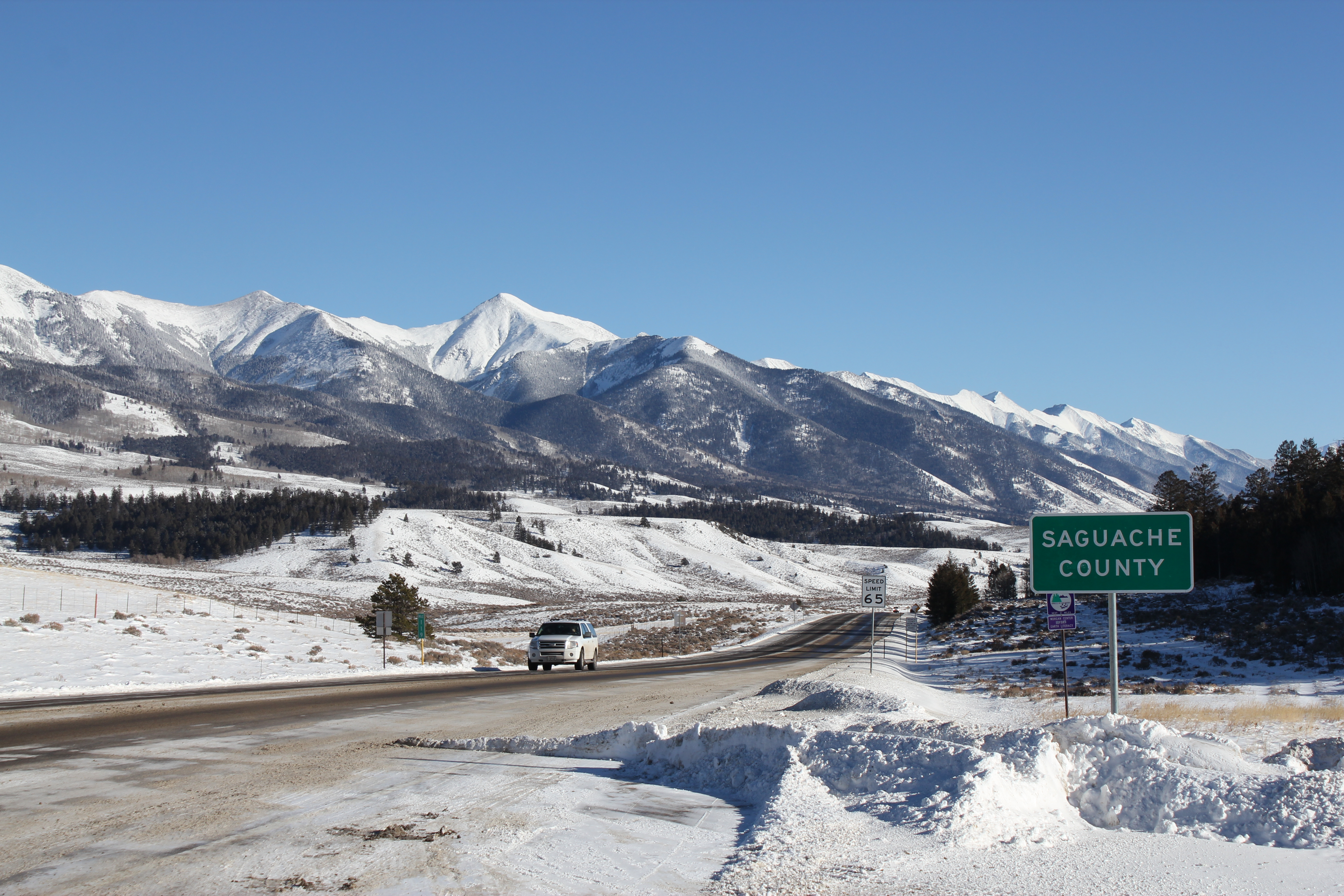
U.S. 285 entering Saguache County from the north

A few miles north, the highway passes through Fairplay and the historic South Park City site, then reaches its highest elevation: 10,051 feet (3,064 m), at the summit of Red Hill Pass. US 285 then leaves the South Park basin and climbs over Kenosha Pass, elevation 10,001 feet (3,048 m), and skirts the south side of the Mount Evans massif as it descends its way through the foothills range towards Denver.

As the highway leaves the Rocky Mountains and reaches Denver's southwest suburbs, it becomes Hampden Avenue, an important artery in the Denver metro area, then reaches its northern terminus at I-25.

On March 14, 2008, both houses of the Colorado legislature, in a unanimous vote, named the section between Kenosha Pass and C-470 the Ralph Carr Memorial Highway.

== History ==
The short segment between US 50 at Salida and US 24 at Buena Vista closely parallels the original U.S. Route 650, which was designated in 1926, but eliminated in 1936 when US 285 was commissioned along its present extent from Sanderson to Denver, mostly replacing state-numbered highways.

Between Bailey and Nathrop, south of Buena Vista, Colorado, US 285 mostly follows the route of the Denver, South Park and Pacific Railroad. The highway passes by the historic community of Como, which became in its day, the natural central hub for the Denver South Park & Pacific. This town was the junction point of three main lines run by the railroad: from Denver to Como across Kenosha Pass; from Como to Leadville via Boreas and Fremont Passes; and from Como to Gunnison and beyond via Trout Creek Pass and the famous Alpine Tunnel. At Kenosha Pass in Park County, CO, remains part of a wye used by the railroad to turn around helper locomotives that assisted trains to ascend the steep mountain passes.

On December 18, 2024, the highway was the site of a fatal wreck when a truck was struck by a Union Pacific Railroad freight train at the level crossing in Pecos, Texas.

== In popular culture ==
US-285 appeared in the Season 2 episode of Stargate SG-1 called "1969". When the military convoy that SG-1 was being transported in breaks down, a sign in the background clearly shows they are on US-285. They would travel back east largely following US-66.

== Major intersections ==
Texas
US 90 in Sanderson
US 385 in Fort Stockton. The highways travel concurrently through Fort Stockton.
I-10 / US 67 in Fort Stockton
I-20 in Pecos
New Mexico
US 62 / US 180 in Carlsbad. The highways travel concurrently through Carlsbad.
US 82 in Artesia
US 70 / US 380 in Roswell. US 70/US 285 travels concurrently to north of Roswell.
US 54 / US 60 southeast of Vaughn. US 54/US 285 travels concurrently to southwest of Vaughn. US 60/US 285 travels concurrently to Encino.
I-40 in Clines Corners
I-25 / US 84 / US 85 in Eldorado at Santa Fe. I-25/US 85/US 285 travels concurrently to south of Santa Fe. US 84/US 285 travels concurrently to north-northwest of Hernandez.
US 64 in Tres Piedras
Colorado
US 160 in Alamosa. The highways travel concurrently to Monte Vista.
US 50 in Poncha Springs. The highways travel concurrently through Poncha Springs.
US 24 in Johnson Village. The highways travel concurrently to Antero Junction.
US 85 in Sheridan and Englewood
I-25 / US 87 in Denver

== See also ==
Browse numbered routes
← SH 283	TX	→ SH 285
← I-270	CO	→ US 287
