= Pastura, New Mexico =

- Census-designated place
- Location within New Mexico Location within the United States
- Coordinates: 34°47′06″N 104°56′32″W
- Country: United States
- State: New Mexico
- County: Guadalupe

Area
  - Total: 0.35 sq mi (0.90 km^{2})
  - Land: 0.35 sq mi (0.90 km^{2})
  - Water: 0 sq mi (0.00 km^{2})
- Elevation: 5,289 ft (1,612 m)

Population (2020)
  - Total: 17
  - Density: 49.0/sq mi (18.91/km^{2})
- Time zone: UTC-7 (Mountain)
  - Summer (DST): UTC-6 (DST)
- ZIP code: 88435
- Area code: 575
- FIPS code: 35-55550
- GNIS feature ID: 2584173

Pastura is a small unincorporated community and census-designated place (CDP) in Guadalupe County, New Mexico, United States, approximately halfway between Santa Rosa and Vaughn. As of the 2020 census, Pastura had a population of 17.

== History ==
It was established in 1901 as a watering spot for steam trains on the Southern Pacific Railroad. In 1903 the US Postal Service built a post office in Pastura in response to its growth, and in 1907, the Southern Pacific Railroad built a 142-mile (229 km) wooden pipeline from the Sierra Blanca mountain range to Pastura.

The small town began to decline when it was bypassed by Route 66, which passed 20 miles (32 km) to the north. When the steam locomotives were replaced by diesel locomotives in the 1940s, the railroad no longer needed to use Pastura as a watering stop, and the town declined even further. Today the area is a small farming community.

The Chicano author Rudolfo Anaya was born in Pastura in 1937.

== Geography ==
Pastura is located southwest of the center of Guadalupe County along U.S. Route 54; it is 19 miles (31 km) southwest of Santa Rosa, the county seat, and 20 miles (32 km) northeast of Vaughn. According to the U.S. Census Bureau, the CDP has an area of 0.3 square miles (0.9 km^{2}), all land.

== Demographics ==
Historical population
| Census | Pop. | Note | %± |
|---|---|---|---|
| 2020 | 17 | | — |
U.S. Decennial Census

== Education ==
Vaughn Municipal Schools is the local school district.
