= Vaughn, New Mexico =

- Town
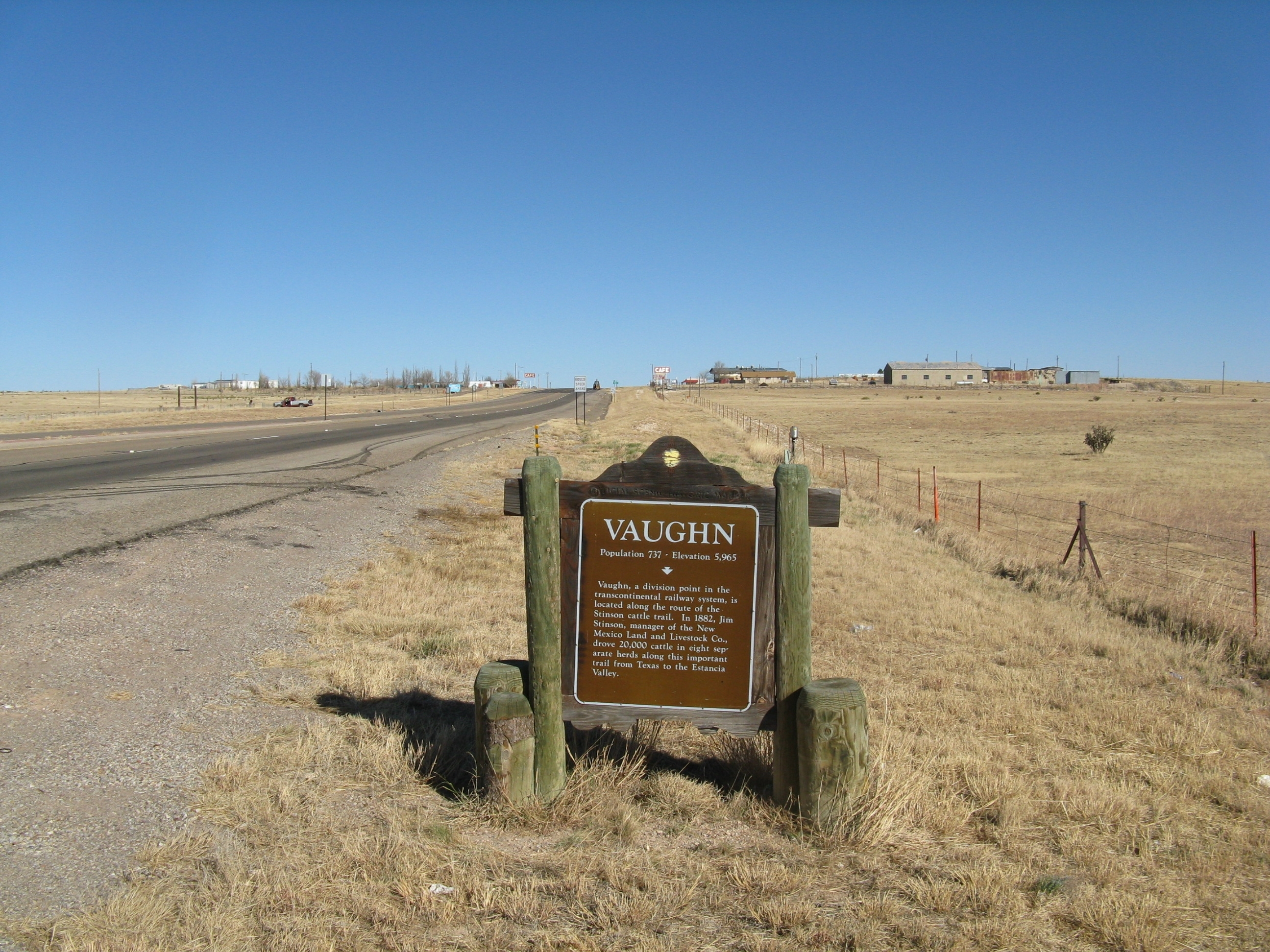
- Entering Vaughn from the west

- Location of Vaughn, New Mexico

- Location in the United States
- Coordinates: 34°36′26″N 105°12′45″W
- Country: United States
- State: New Mexico
- County: Guadalupe

Area
  - Total: 5.60 sq mi (14.50 km^{2})
  - Land: 5.60 sq mi (14.50 km^{2})
  - Water: 0 sq mi (0.00 km^{2})
- Elevation: 5,968 ft (1,819 m)

Population (2020)
  - Total: 286
  - Density: 51.1/sq mi (19.72/km^{2})
- Time zone: UTC-7 (Mountain (MST))
  - Summer (DST): UTC-6 (MDT)
- ZIP code: 88353
- Area code: 575
- FIPS code: 35-82570
- GNIS feature ID: 2413424

Vaughn is a town in Guadalupe County, New Mexico, United States. The population was 286 at the 2020 census, down from the figure of 446 recorded in 2010. It is located at an intersection of the Burlington Northern Santa Fe and Union Pacific railroad lines.

== History ==
Vaughn is named after Major George W. Vaughn, a civil engineer who was employed by the Santa Fe railroad. Vaughn was established in the early 20th century as a Southern Pacific Railroad town. The town's importance grew when a second railroad, the Eastern Railway of New Mexico (an Atchison, Topeka and Santa Fe line from Belen to Clovis), was completed in 1907 with Vaughn as a division point. A large two-story depot, a roundhouse, and a Harvey House hotel were constructed shortly thereafter. Vaughn was incorporated in 1919 and in 1920 had a population of 888, according to the U.S. census.

The Guadalupe County Sheriff's Department, New Mexico Rangers, the New Mexico State Police and Motor Transportation Police and the Vaughn Police Department (presently a one-man agency) all patrol the town, which, according to the United States Homeland Security, is a known drug-smuggling route.

== Geography ==
Vaughn is located in southwestern Guadalupe County. U.S. Routes 54, 60, and 285 pass through the town as 8th Street. US 54 leads northeast 40 miles (64 km) to Santa Rosa, the Guadalupe County seat, and southwest 138 miles (222 km) to Alamogordo. US 60 leads east 118 miles (190 km) to Clovis and west 104 miles (167 km) to Interstate 25 in the Rio Grande valley. US 285 leads southeast 96 miles (154 km) to Roswell; to the west it follows US 60 16 miles (26 km) to Encino, then turns northwest and leads an additional 27 miles (43 km) to Interstate 40 at Clines Corners.

According to the United States Census Bureau, the town has an area of 5.6 square miles (14.5 km^{2}), all land.

== Demographics ==
Historical population
Census	Pop.	Note	%±
1920	888		—
1930	968		9.0%
1940	1,331		37.5%
1950	1,356		1.9%
1960	1,170		−13.7%
1970	867		−25.9%
1980	737		−15.0%
1990	633		−14.1%
2000	539		−14.8%
2010	446		−17.3%
2020	286		−35.9%
U.S. Decennial Census

As of the census of 2000, there were 539 people, 232 households, and 154 families residing in the town. The population density was 96.3 inhabitants per square mile (37.2/km^{2}). There were 338 housing units at an average density of 60.4 per square mile (23.3/km^{2}). The racial makeup of the town was 52.69% White, 0.37% Native American, 43.97% from other races, and 2.97% from two or more races. Hispanic or Latino of any race were 87.01% of the population.

There were 232 households, out of which 29.3% had children under the age of 18 living with them, 48.7% were married couples living together, 12.9% had a female householder with no husband present, and 33.2% were non-families. 31.0% of all households were made up of individuals, and 13.8% had someone living alone who was 65 years of age or older. The average household size was 2.32 and the average family size was 2.88.

In the town, the population was spread out, with 25.4% under the age of 18, 7.8% from 18 to 24, 24.7% from 25 to 44, 25.4% from 45 to 64, and 16.7% who were 65 years of age or older. The median age was 39 years. For every 100 females, there were 83.3 males. For every 100 females age 18 and over, there were 82.7 males.

The median income for a household in the town was $23,083, and the median income for a family was $27,059. Males had a median income of $25,833 versus $14,444 for females. The per capita income for the town was $11,014. About 13.9% of families and 21.7% of the population were below the poverty line, including 20.1% of those under age 18 and 17.7% of those age 65 or over.

== Education ==
Vaughn Municipal Schools is the local school district.

== Gallery ==
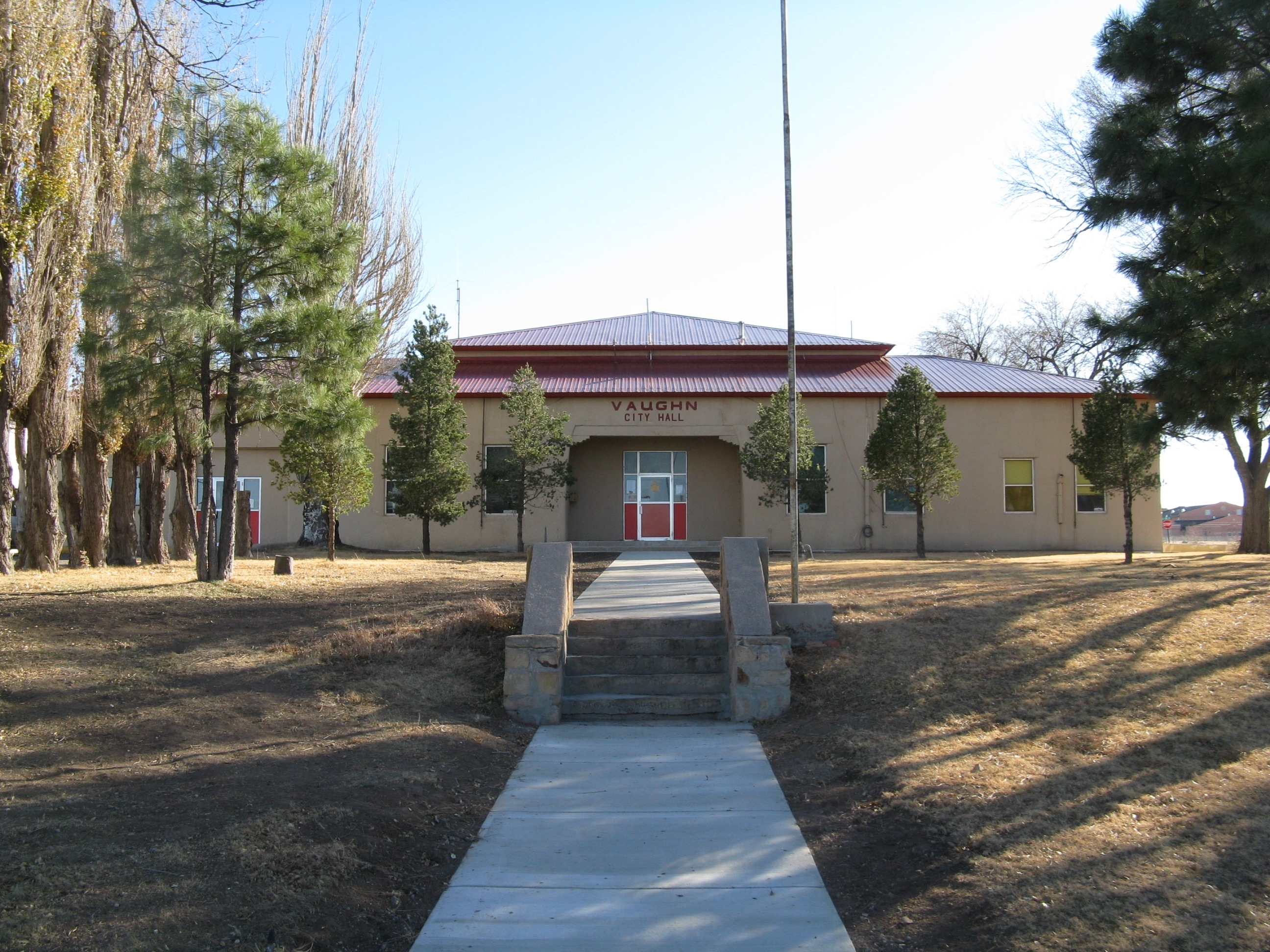
City Hall

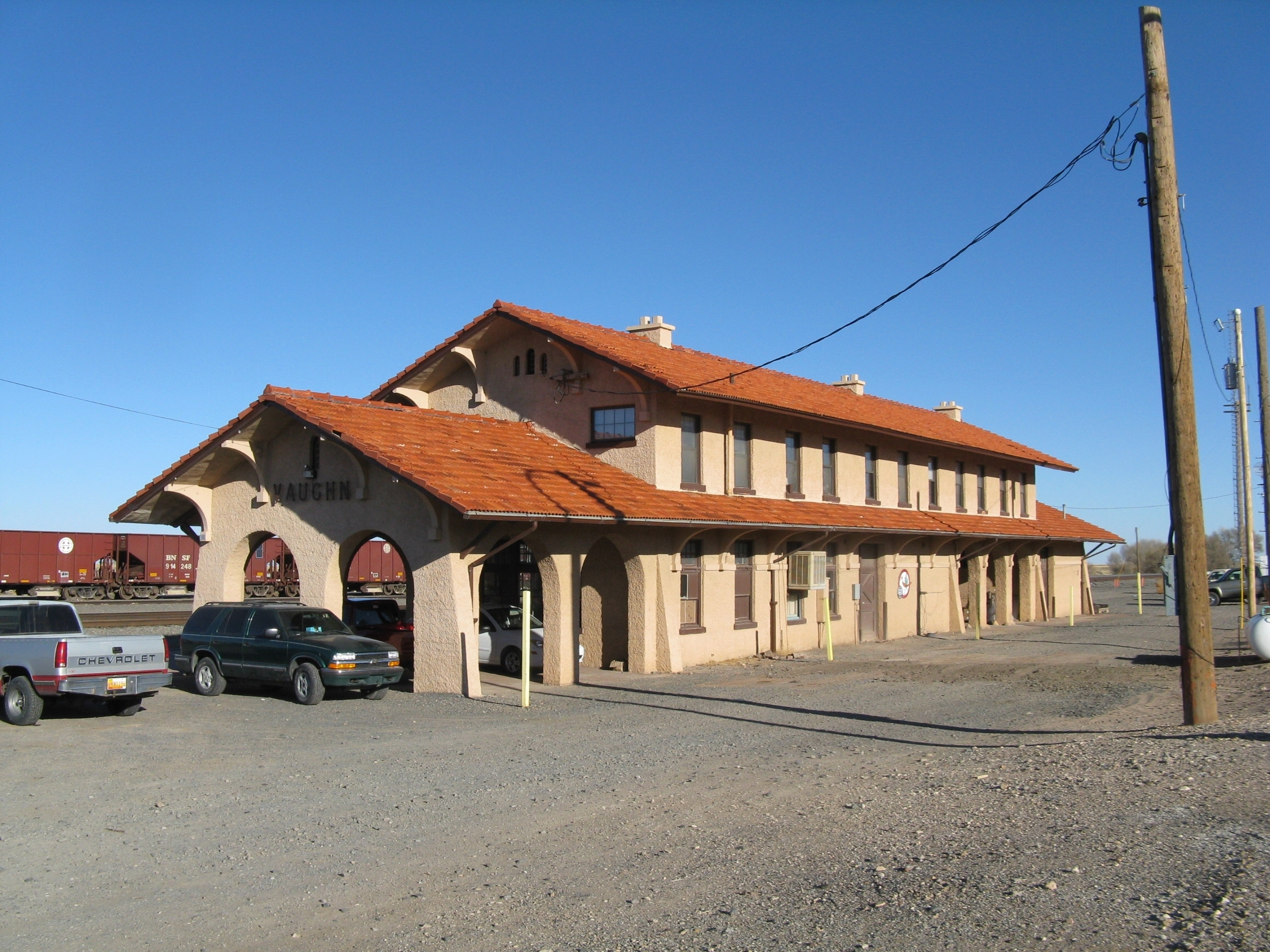
Depot

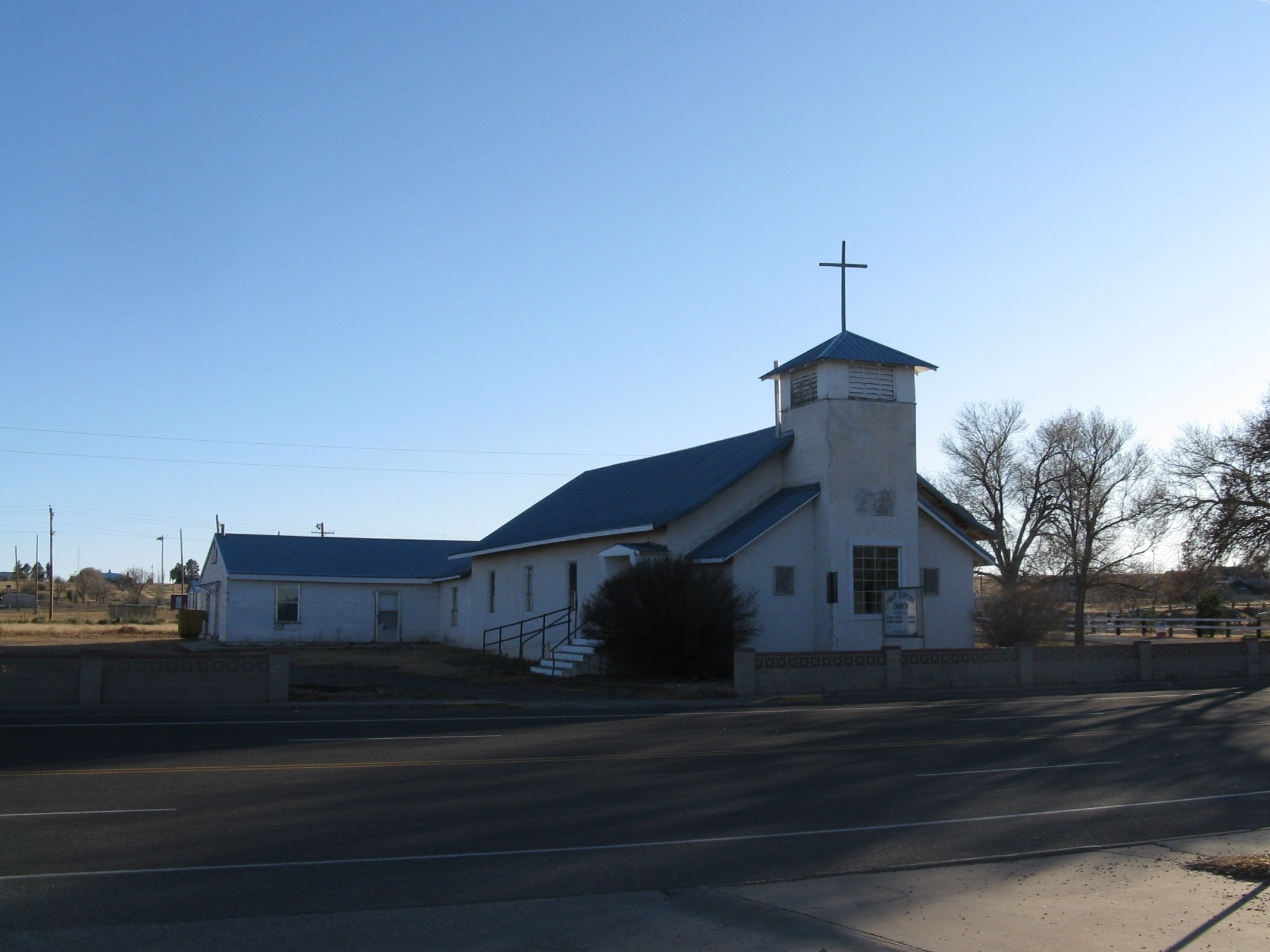
First Baptist Church

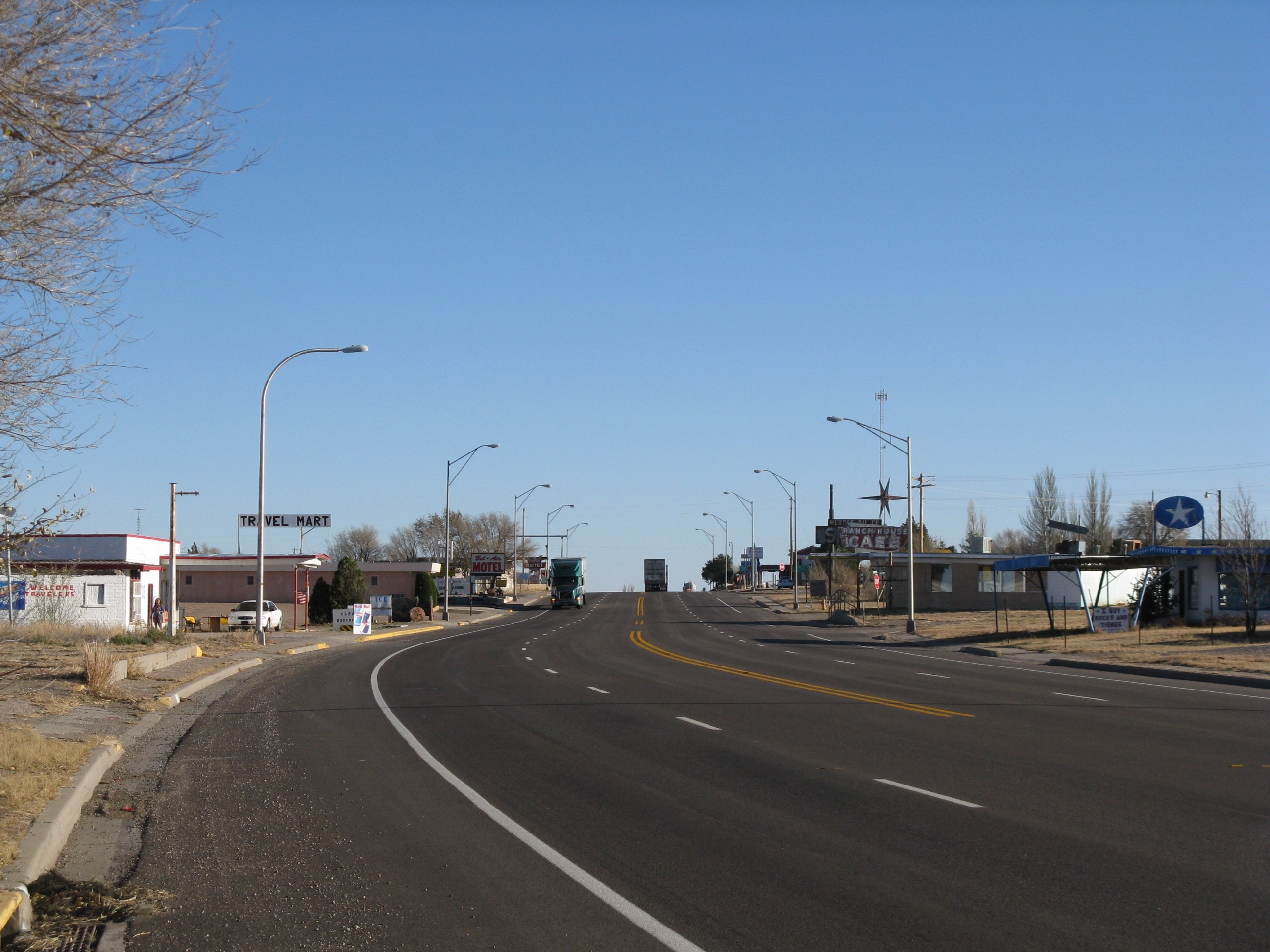
8th Street/US 54,60,285

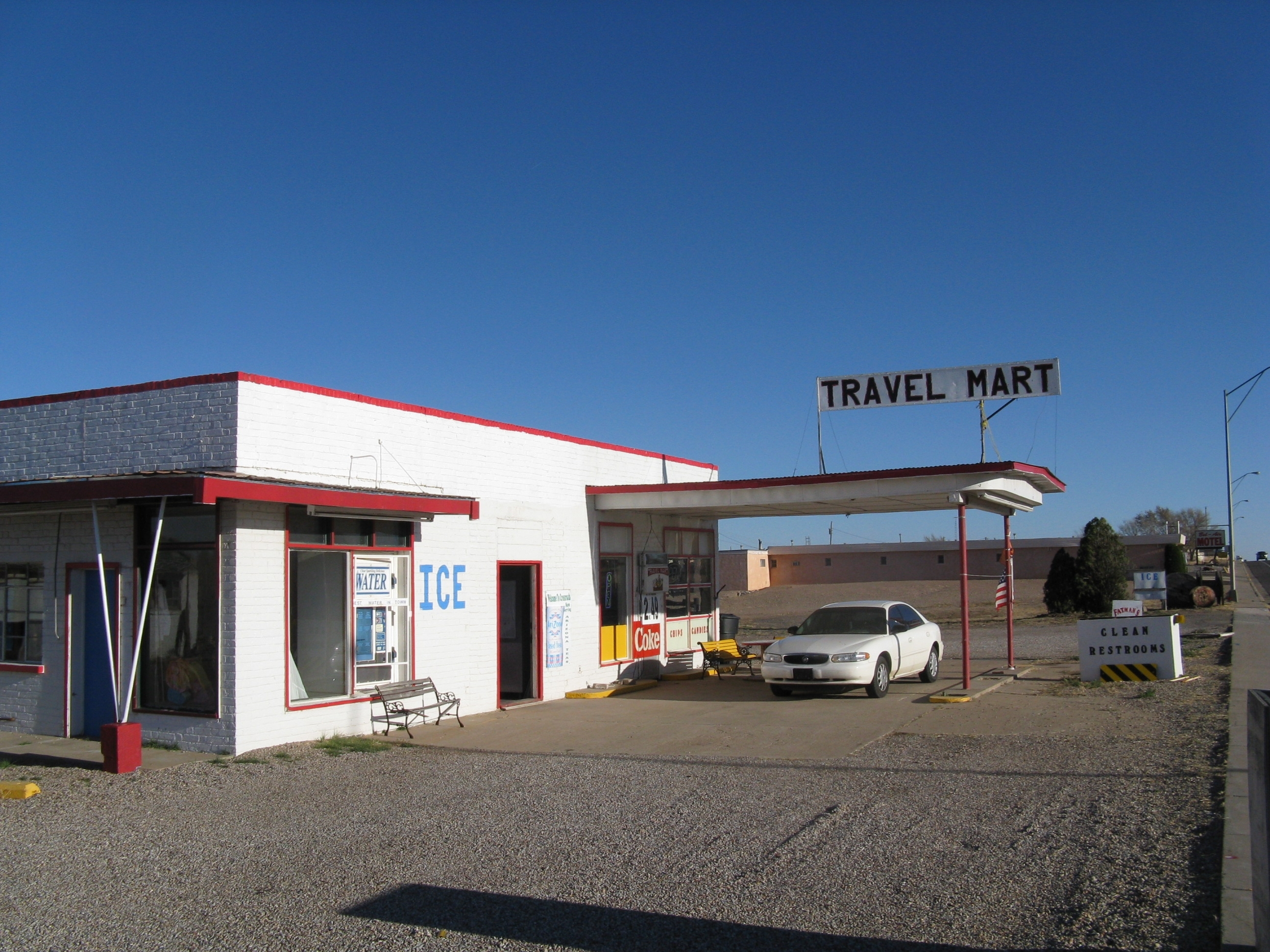
Travel Mart

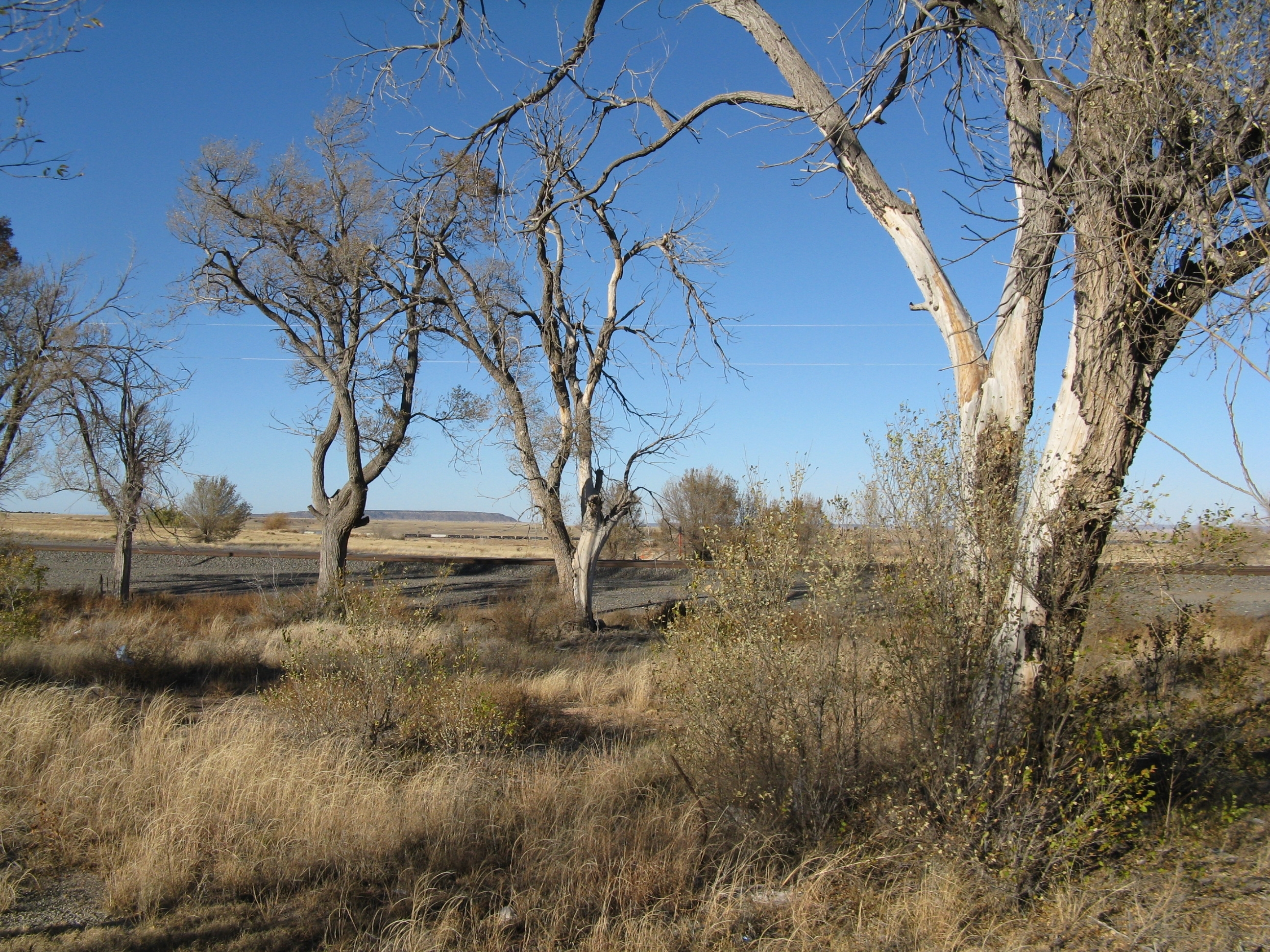
cottonwoods

== See also ==
- List of municipalities in New Mexico
