= Vaughn Municipal Schools =

School district in New Mexico, U.S.

Vaughn Municipal Schools (VMS) is a public school district headquartered in Vaughn, New Mexico.

In Guadalupe County the district includes Vaughn and the census-designated place of Pastura. In Torrance County the district includes the town of Encino and the census-designated place of Duran.

== History ==
In 1963 the school allowed corporal punishment if the principal watches the punishment.

In 1964 a committee held by the State of New Mexico recommended some changes in administration be made, and the school district went to enact them.

In 2021 the school district had a total of 60 students. In 2020 the percentage of students who, under New Mexican state tests, were deemed to have sufficient reading skills was 21%. By October 2021 this was up to 46%.
