= Ancho, New Mexico =

Ancho
- Unincorporated community
- Location within the state of New Mexico Ancho (the United States)
- Coordinates: 33°56′14″N 105°44′28″W
- Country: United States
- State: New Mexico
- County: Lincoln
- Time zone: UTC-7 (Mountain (MST))
  - Summer (DST): UTC-6 (MDT)

Ancho is an unincorporated desert hamlet in Lincoln County, New Mexico, United States. It is located west of the Lincoln National Forest, 2 miles east of U.S. Highway 54, and north of the town of Carrizozo. There is an active Presbyterian church at Ancho; however, there are no businesses or services available. Most of the land and historic buildings that were once part of the community-at-large are now on private property and not accessible to the general public.

== History ==
With the arrival of the railway in 1901 and the discovery of gypsum and clay, the Ancho Brick Plant was established and began producing bricks. The plant eventually grew to 16 kilns. In 1906, the Ancho Brick Plant supplied several tons of bricks which were shipped by railway to San Francisco to help rebuild the city after the 1906 San Francisco earthquake. When Highway 54 was paved and rerouted two miles to the west of town, the brick plant closed its doors for good in 1921. That was a fatal blow to Ancho's economy. The town then began its slow decline. In 1955, the Ancho School closed its doors. Four years after in 1959 the train station closed, and in 1969, Ancho's Post Office shut its doors. Today the remaining local residents have restored many of Ancho's remaining pioneer buildings including the school and train station.
