= Dexter, New Mexico =

Dexter, New Mexico, U.S.
- Town
- Location of Dexter, New Mexico

- Location in the United States
- Coordinates: 33°11′44″N 104°22′20″W
- Country: United States
- State: New Mexico
- County: Chaves

Area
  - Total: 0.79 sq mi (2.05 km^{2})
  - Land: 0.73 sq mi (1.89 km^{2})
  - Water: 0.062 sq mi (0.16 km^{2})
- Elevation: 3,458 ft (1,054 m)

Population (2020)
  - Total: 1,074
  - Density: 1,472/sq mi (568.5/km^{2})
- Time zone: UTC-7 (Mountain (MST))
  - Summer (DST): UTC-6 (MDT)
- ZIP code: 88230
- Area code: 575
- FIPS code: 35-20620
- GNIS feature ID: 2412426

Dexter is a town in Chaves County, New Mexico, United States. As of the 2020 census, Dexter had a population of 1,074.

== Geography ==
Dexter is located in south-central Chaves County approximately 2 miles (3 km) west of the Pecos River. New Mexico State Road 2 passes through the town, leading northwest 17 miles (27 km) to Roswell, the county seat, and southeast 6 miles (10 km) to Hagerman.

According to the United States Census Bureau, Dexter has a total area of 0.81 square miles (2.1 km^{2}), of which 0.73 square miles (1.9 km^{2}) is land and 0.077 square miles (0.2 km^{2}), or 7.88%, is water.

== Demographics ==
Historical population
Census	Pop.	Note	%±
1910	242		—
1920	333		37.6%
1930	459		37.8%
1940	734		59.9%
1950	784		6.8%
1960	885		12.9%
1970	746		−15.7%
1980	882		18.2%
1990	898		1.8%
2000	1,235		37.5%
2010	1,266		2.5%
2020	1,074		−15.2%
U.S. Decennial Census

As of the census of 2000, there were 1,235 people, 390 households, and 333 families residing in the town. The population density was 1,681.2 inhabitants per square mile (649.1/km^{2}). There were 434 housing units at an average density of 590.8 per square mile (228.1/km^{2}). The racial makeup of the town was 60.00% White, 0.24% African American, 0.73% Native American, 35.47% from other races, and 3.56% from two or more races. Hispanic or Latino of any race were 71.17% of the population.

There were 390 households, out of which 47.9% had children under the age of 18 living with them, 62.3% were married couples living together, 17.7% had a female householder with no husband present, and 14.6% were non-families. 11.5% of all households were made up of individuals, and 4.9% had someone living alone who was 65 years of age or older. The average household size was 3.17 and the average family size was 3.39.

In the town, the population was spread out, with 35.3% under the age of 18, 9.9% from 18 to 24, 27.4% from 25 to 44, 17.1% from 45 to 64, and 10.3% who were 65 years of age or older. The median age was 30 years. For every 100 females, there were 94.8 males. For every 100 females age 18 and over, there were 86.7 males.

The median income for a household in the town was $30,707, and the median income for a family was $31,316. Males had a median income of $23,950 versus $16,591 for females. The per capita income for the town was $10,239. About 14.8% of families and 14.9% of the population were below the poverty line, including 16.2% of those under age 18 and 31.5% of those age 65 or over.

== Notable person ==
- Mike E. Smith, jockey who won the Triple Crown in 2018
