= Maljamar, New Mexico =

Unincorporated community in New Mexico, US

Coordinates: 32°51′22″N 103°45′46″W

Maljamar is an unincorporated community in Lea County, New Mexico, United States. The zip code is 88264. It is close to Hobbs and Carlsbad.

According to legend, Maljamar's founder William Mitchell named the town after his three children Malcom, Janet and Margaret.

President Barack Obama visited Maljamar on March 21, 2012 to tour the local oil fields and deliver remarks.
