= Encino, New Mexico =

- Village
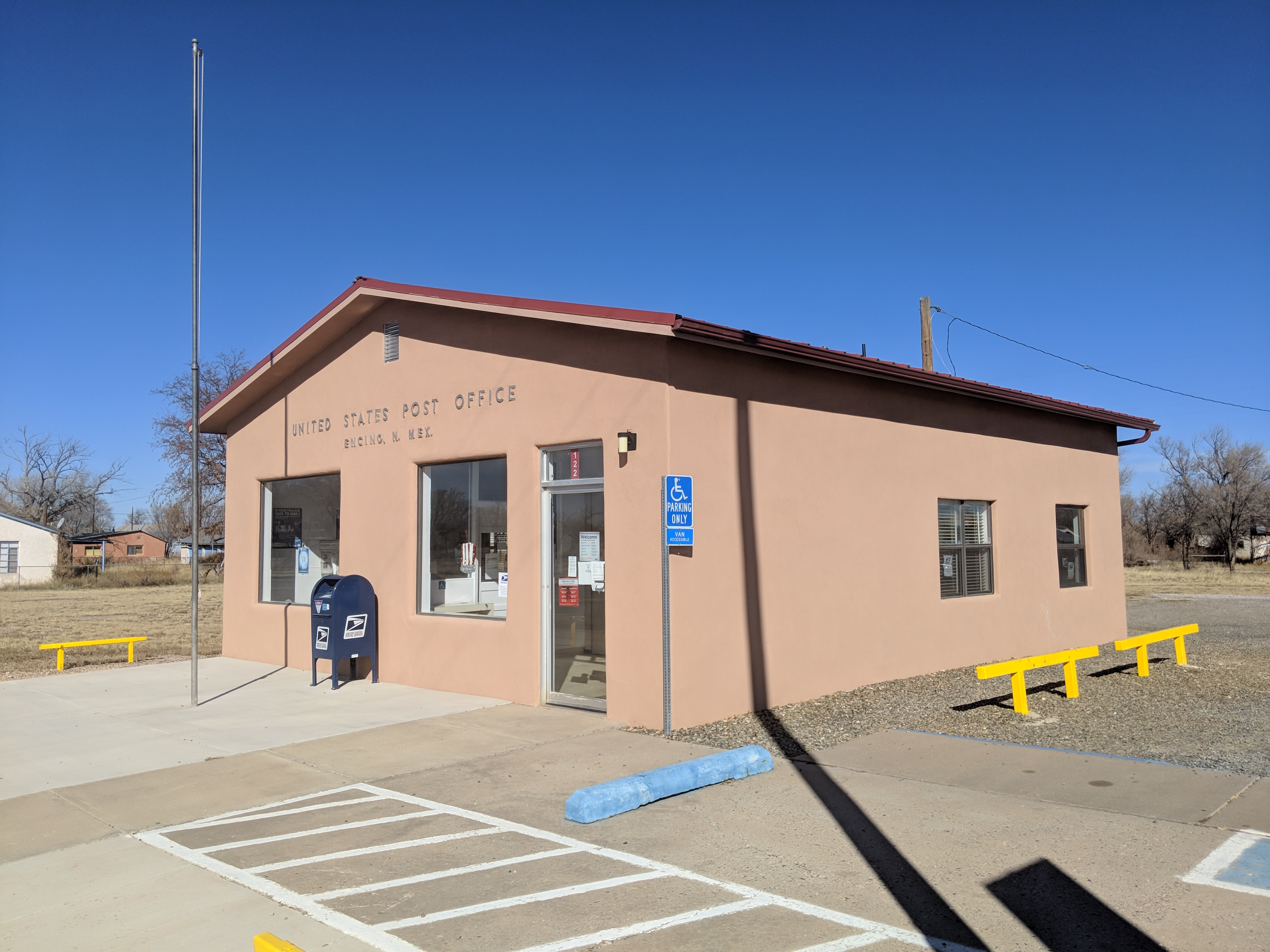
- Post Office

- Location of Encino, New Mexico

- Location in the United States
- Coordinates: 34°39′07″N 105°27′31″W
- Country: United States
- State: New Mexico
- County: Torrance

Area
  - Total: 1.99 sq mi (5.16 km^{2})
  - Land: 1.99 sq mi (5.16 km^{2})
  - Water: 0 sq mi (0.00 km^{2})
- Elevation: 6,116 ft (1,864 m)

Population (2020)
  - Total: 51
  - Density: 25.6/sq mi (9.89/km^{2})
- Time zone: UTC-7 (Mountain (MST))
  - Summer (DST): UTC-6 (MDT)
- ZIP code: 88321
- Area code: 575
- FIPS code: 35-24610
- GNIS feature ID: 2413549

Encino is a village in Torrance County, New Mexico, United States. The population was 51 at the 2020 census. It is part of the Albuquerque Metropolitan Statistical Area.

== Government ==
As of 2026, the municipal government of Encino, NM, is:

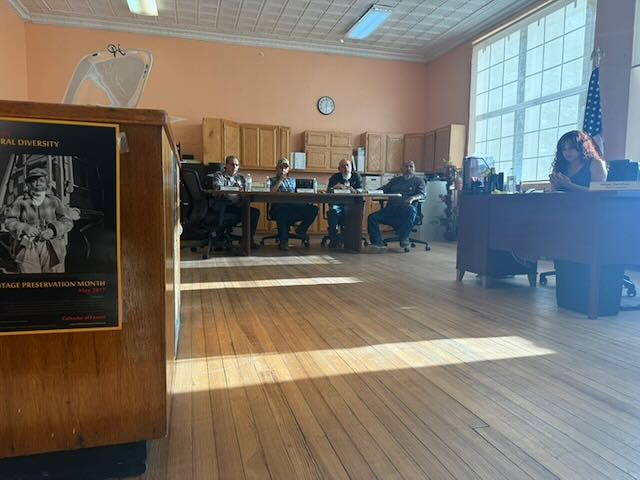
The April 14, 2026, meeting of the Encino Village Council, including Mayor Elias Sanchez, Councilors Herman Garcia and Stephen Guyman, Mayor Pro Tem Victor Gqallegos, and Village Clerk Angel Sanchez. Absent is Councilor Corine Perez.

- Mayor Elias Sanchez
- Mayor Pro Tem Victor Gallegos
- Councilor Corine Perez
- Councilor Herman Garcia
- Councilor Stephen Guyman
- Village Clerk Angel Sanchez

== Geography ==
According to the United States Census Bureau, the village has a total area of 2.0 square miles (5.2 km^{2}), all land.

== Demographics ==
Historical population
Census	Pop.	Note	%±
1940	652		—
1950	408		−37.4%
1960	346		−15.2%
1970	250		−27.7%
1980	155		−38.0%
1990	131		−15.5%
2000	94		−28.2%
2010	82		−12.8%
2020	51		−37.8%
U.S. Decennial Census

As of the census of 2000, there were 94 people, 43 households, and 27 families residing in the village. The population density was 47.2 inhabitants per square mile (18.2/km^{2}). There were 70 housing units at an average density of 35.2 per square mile (13.6/km^{2}). The racial makeup of the village was 56.38% White, 42.55% from other races, and 1.06% from two or more races. Hispanic or Latino of any race were 80.85% of the population.

There were 43 households, out of which 30.2% had children under the age of 18 living with them, 53.5% were married couples living together, 9.3% had a female householder with no husband present, and 34.9% were non-families. 27.9% of all households were made up of individuals, and 16.3% had someone living alone who was 65 years of age or older. The average household size was 2.19 and the average family size was 2.68.

In the village, the population was spread out, with 17.0% under the age of 18, 4.3% from 18 to 24, 25.5% from 25 to 44, 31.9% from 45 to 64, and 21.3% who were 65 years of age or older. The median age was 46 years. For every 100 females, there were 108.9 males. For every 100 females age 18 and over there were 105.3 males.

The median income for a household in the village was $22,679, and the median income for a family was $28,250. Males had a median income of $29,375 versus $22,083 for females. The per capita income for the village was $12,191. 2.2% of the population lives below the poverty line, including no families or anyone under 18 or over 64.

== Education ==
Vaughn Municipal Schools is the local school district.
