= Clines Corners, New Mexico =

- Unincorporated community
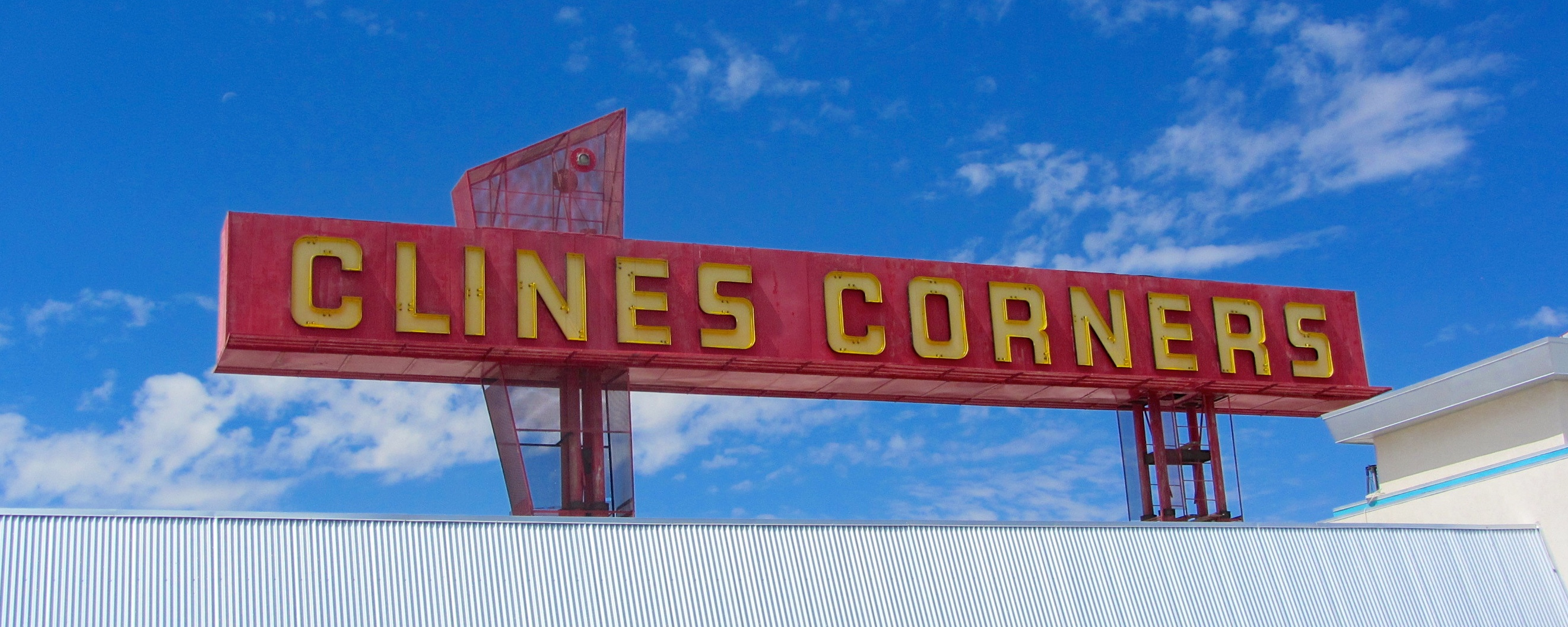

- Location within New Mexico
- Coordinates: 35°00′34″N 105°40′09″W
- Country: United States
- State: New Mexico
- County: Torrance
- Elevation: 7,057 ft (2,151 m)
- Time zone: UTC-7 (Mountain (MST))
  - Summer (DST): UTC-6 (MDT)
- ZIP code: 87070
- Area code: 575
- GNIS feature ID: 898646

Clines Corners is an unincorporated community in Torrance County, New Mexico, United States. Clines Corners is located at the junction of Interstate 40 and U.S. Route 285, 21.6 miles (34.8 km) east of Moriarty. The community was established in 1934 by Roy E. Cline, who built a rest stop at what was then the intersection of US 66 and US 285; the rest stop, known as Clines Corners Retail Center, is now over 30,000 square feet (2,800 m^{2}) in size.
