= Chilili, New Mexico =

- Census-designated place
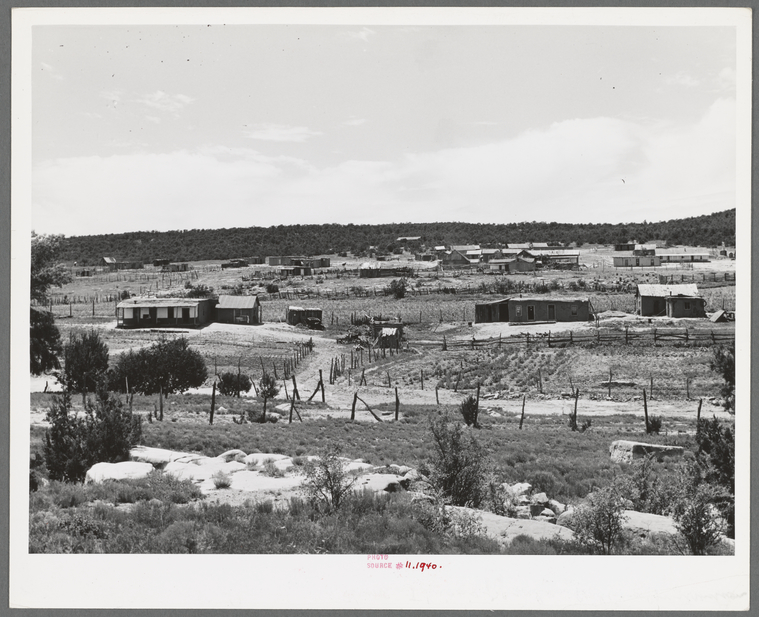
- Chilili, New Mexico in 1940

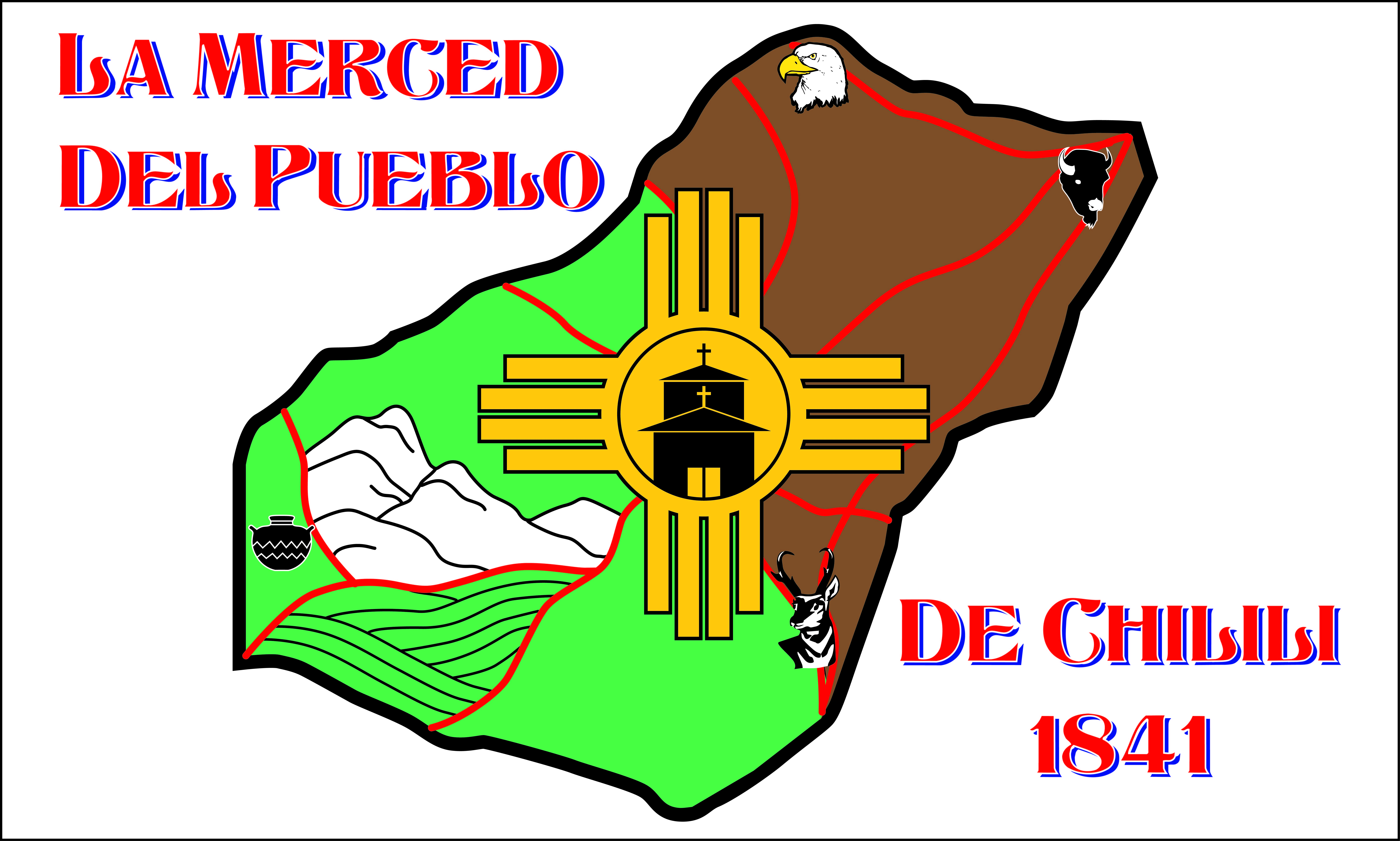
- Flag

- Location of Chilili, New Mexico

- Location in the United States
- Coordinates: 34°53′51″N 106°13′59″W
- Country: United States
- State: New Mexico
- County: Bernalillo

Area
  - Total: 0.99 sq mi (2.57 km^{2})
  - Land: 0.99 sq mi (2.57 km^{2})
  - Water: 0 sq mi (0.00 km^{2})
- Elevation: 6,841 ft (2,085 m)

Population (2020)
  - Total: 126
  - Density: 126.9/sq mi (49.01/km^{2})
- Time zone: UTC−07:00 (Mountain (MST))
  - Summer (DST): UTC−06:00 (MDT)
- ZIP code: 87059
- Area code: 505
- FIPS code: 35-14880
- GNIS feature ID: 2408025

Chilili is a census-designated place in Bernalillo County, New Mexico, United States. As of the 2020 census, Chilili had a population of 126. It is part of the Albuquerque Metropolitan Statistical Area.

== Geography ==
Chilili is located in southeastern Bernalillo County. New Mexico State Road 337 passes through the community, leading northwest 19 miles (31 km) to Tijeras and Interstate 40, and south 10 miles (16 km) to NM 55 east of Tajique.

According to the United States Census Bureau, the Chilili CDP has a total area of 1.0 square mile (2.6 km^{2}), all land.

== Demographics ==
Historical population
Census	Pop.	Note	%±
2020	126		—
U.S. Decennial Census

As of the census of 2000, there were 113 people, 37 households, and 33 families residing in the CDP. The population density was 114.0 people per square mile (44.0 people/km^{2}). There were 44 housing units at an average density of 44.4 per square mile (17.1/km^{2}). The racial makeup of the CDP was 34.51% White, 2.65% African American, 7.08% Native American, 52.21% from other races, and 3.54% from two or more races. 92.04% of the population were Hispanic or Latino of any race.

There were 37 households, out of which 54.1% had children under the age of 18 living with them, 67.6% were married couples living together, 13.5% had a female householder with no husband present, and 10.8% were non-families. 8.1% of all households were made up of individuals, and none had someone living alone who was 65 years of age or older. The average household size was 3.05 and the average family size was 3.18.

In the CDP, the population was spread out, with 33.6% under the age of 18, 15.0% from 18 to 24, 20.4% from 25 to 44, 23.9% from 45 to 64, and 7.1% who were 65 years of age or older. The median age was 28 years. For every 100 females, there were 121.6 males. For every 100 females age 18 and over, there were 120.6 males.

The median income for a household in the CDP was $43,571, and the median income for a family was $32,292. Males had a median income of $31,625 versus $26,250 for females. The per capita income for the CDP was $11,749. There were 23.8% of families and 28.6% of the population living below the poverty line, including 36.7% of under eighteens and none of those over 64.

== Education ==
It is zoned to Albuquerque Public Schools.

== Culture ==
In August Chilili holds a celebration of their church, San Juan Nepomucena with a traditional dance called Los Matachine Danzantes de la Sierra.

Chilili also has a strong agricultural heritage. They have their own rodeo club that hosts the Chilili Rodeo, and twice a year the Chilili Bull-A-Rama, where riders try to challenge themselves to stay on a bucking bull as long as possible.

== See also ==
- List of census-designated places in New Mexico
- New Spain
- Spanish land grants in New Mexico
- Spanish missions in New Mexico
