= Interstate 40 in New Mexico =

Section of Interstate Highway in New Mexico, United States

Interstate 40
- I-40 highlighted in red

Route information
- Maintained by NMDOT
- Length: 373.530 mi (601.138 km)
- Existed: 1957–present
- NHS: Entire route

Major junctions
- West end: I-40 at the Arizona state line in Lupton, AZ
- US 491 in Gallup; NM 6 at Correo; I-25 in Albuquerque; US 285 at Clines Corners; US 84 / NM 219 north of Pastura; US 54 / US 84 in Santa Rosa; US 54 in Tucumcari
- East end: I-40 at the Texas state line in Glenrio

Location
- Country: United States
- State: New Mexico
- Counties: McKinley, Cibola, Bernalillo, Santa Fe, Torrance, Guadalupe, Quay

Highway system
- Interstate Highway System; Main; Auxiliary; Suffixed; Business; Future; New Mexico State Highway System; Interstate; US; State; Scenic
← NM 39	→ NM 41

Interstate 40 (I-40), a major east–west route of the Interstate Highway System, runs east–west through Albuquerque in the US state of New Mexico. It is the direct replacement for the historic U.S. Highway 66 (US 66).

== Route description ==
=== Arizona to Albuquerque ===
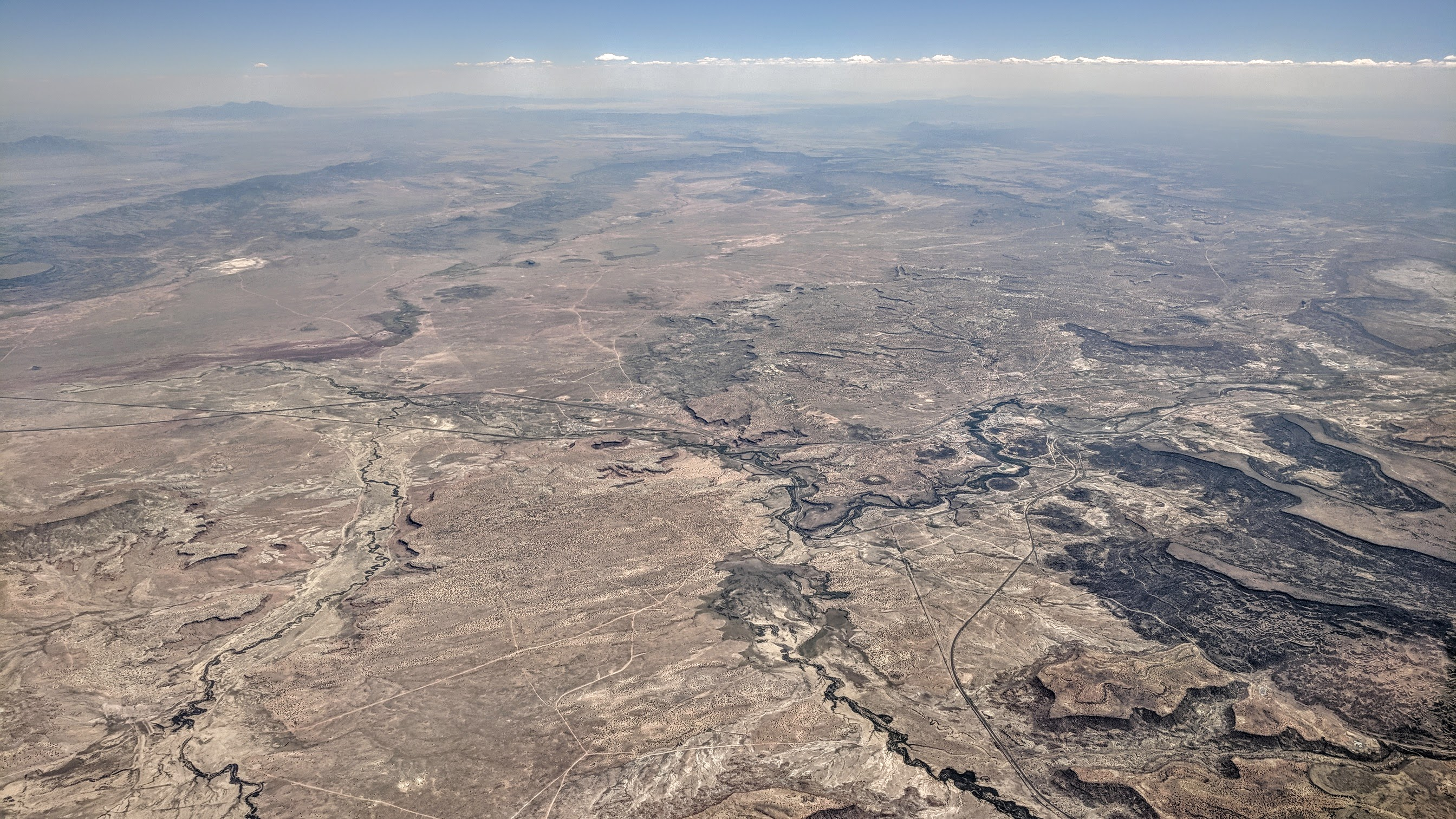
Aerial view, from the north, of I-40 in western New Mexico between Grants and Albuquerque, with Laguna Pueblo, Mesita, and Rio San Jose, and tributaries Arroyo Conchas (left) and Rio Paguate (right, with NM 279)

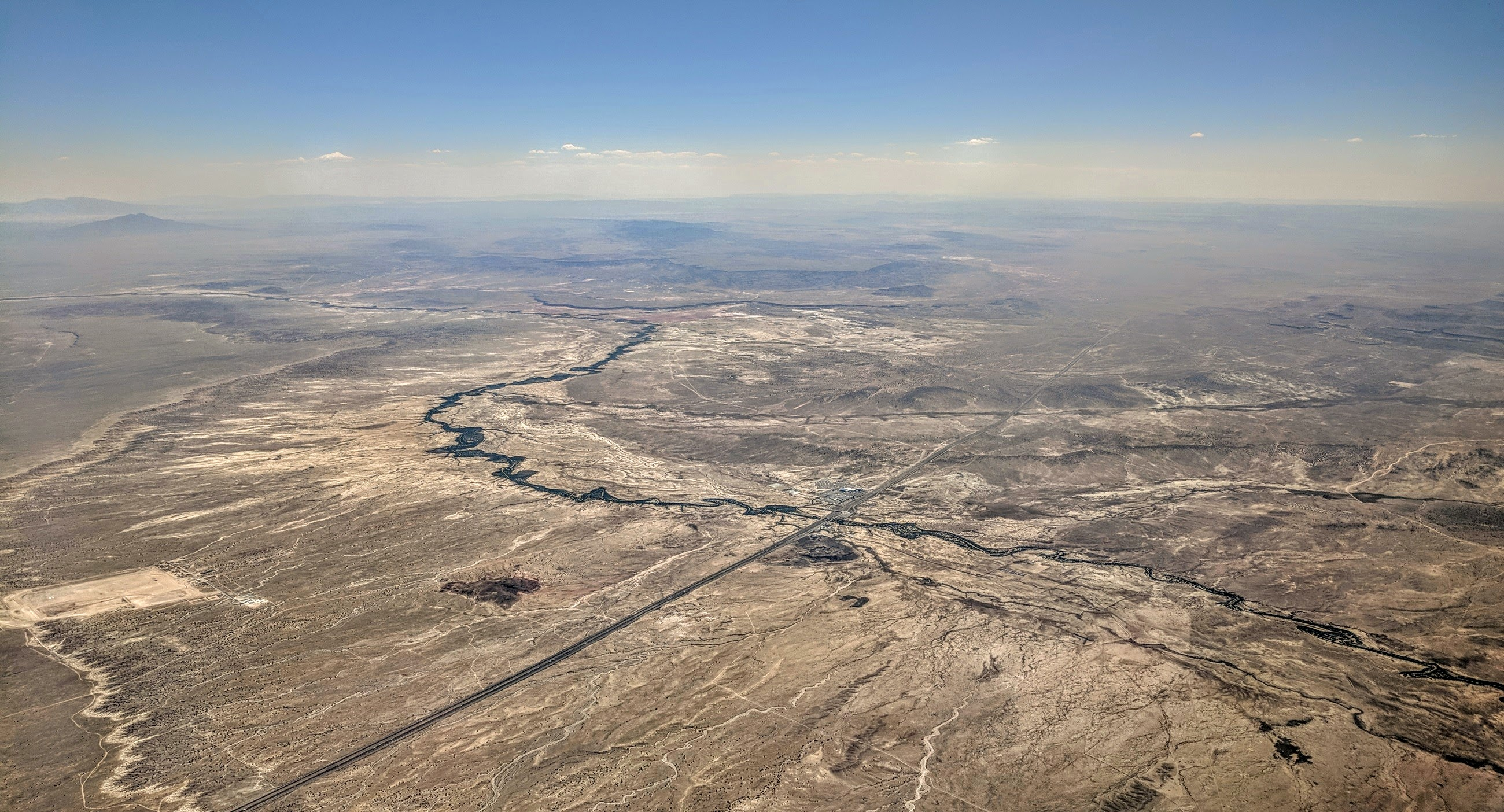
I-40 at Rio Puerco just west of Albuquerque, New Mexico, with the Route 66 Casino by their intersection

As I-40 enters New Mexico in a northeasterly direction, it begins following the basin of the intermittent Puerco River (Rio Puerco of the West, as opposed to the Rio Puerco of the East that it crosses near Albuquerque), roughly tracing the southern edge of the contiguous part of the Navajo Reservation in the state. The freeway enters Gallup 20 miles (32 km) later, paralleling the Burlington Northern Santa Fe Railway's southern transcontinental mainline. Leaving Gallup, the now more easterly I-40 passes to the north of Fort Wingate and part of the fragmented Cibola National Forest before crossing the North American continental divide via Campbell Pass at an elevation of 7,275 feet (2,217 m), with the 11,305-foot (3,446 m) stratovolcano Mount Taylor towering to the east.

The highway traverses more of the Navajo Reservation and the Cibola Forest before turning southeast and crossing a malpaís. After serving interchanges near Grants, the freeway, coinciding with the northern boundary of El Malpais National Monument, crosses another malpaís, turns east, and enters the Acoma Indian Reservation, home of the Acoma Pueblo. The route leaves the Acoma Indian Reservation with Mt. Taylor to the north and enters the Laguna Pueblo. Near the interchange with State Road 6 (NM 6), the railway line that accompanies much of the route from the Arizona border diverts to the south while the freeway turns east by northeast toward Albuquerque. The route departs the Laguna Pueblo, briefly transits the Tohajiilee Indian Reservation (a chapter of the Navajo Nation), crosses the Rio Puerco, and begins a steep climb to the top of a mesa marked by several small cinder cones overlooking the Rio Grande rift and Albuquerque.

From Laguna to the Route 66 Casino, I-40 has at-grade intersections with a number of ranch access roads in violation of Interstate Highway standards. These intersections are a vestige that remain from the conversion of US 66 to I-40 during the latter part of the 20th century.

=== Albuquerque Metro Area ===
I-40 diverges from the former US 66 alignment (Central Avenue) at an interchange with Atrisco Vista Boulevard on the West Mesa that overlooks Albuquerque. I-40 descends Nine Mile Hill as it enters the city of Albuquerque and intersects 98th Street, NM 345 (Unser Boulevard), and NM 45 (Coors Boulevard) before crossing the Rio Grande. The freeway then skirts the northern edge of Downtown Albuquerque before intersecting I-25 at a five-level stack interchange (Big I). East of I-25, I-40 continues east, then turns southeast, passing through Uptown before intersecting Old US 66 (now signed as NM 333/Central Avenue) at NM 556 (Tramway Boulevard) as it leaves Albuquerque and enters Tijeras Canyon. This section of I-40 is also referred to as the Coronado Freeway.

=== Albuquerque to Texas ===
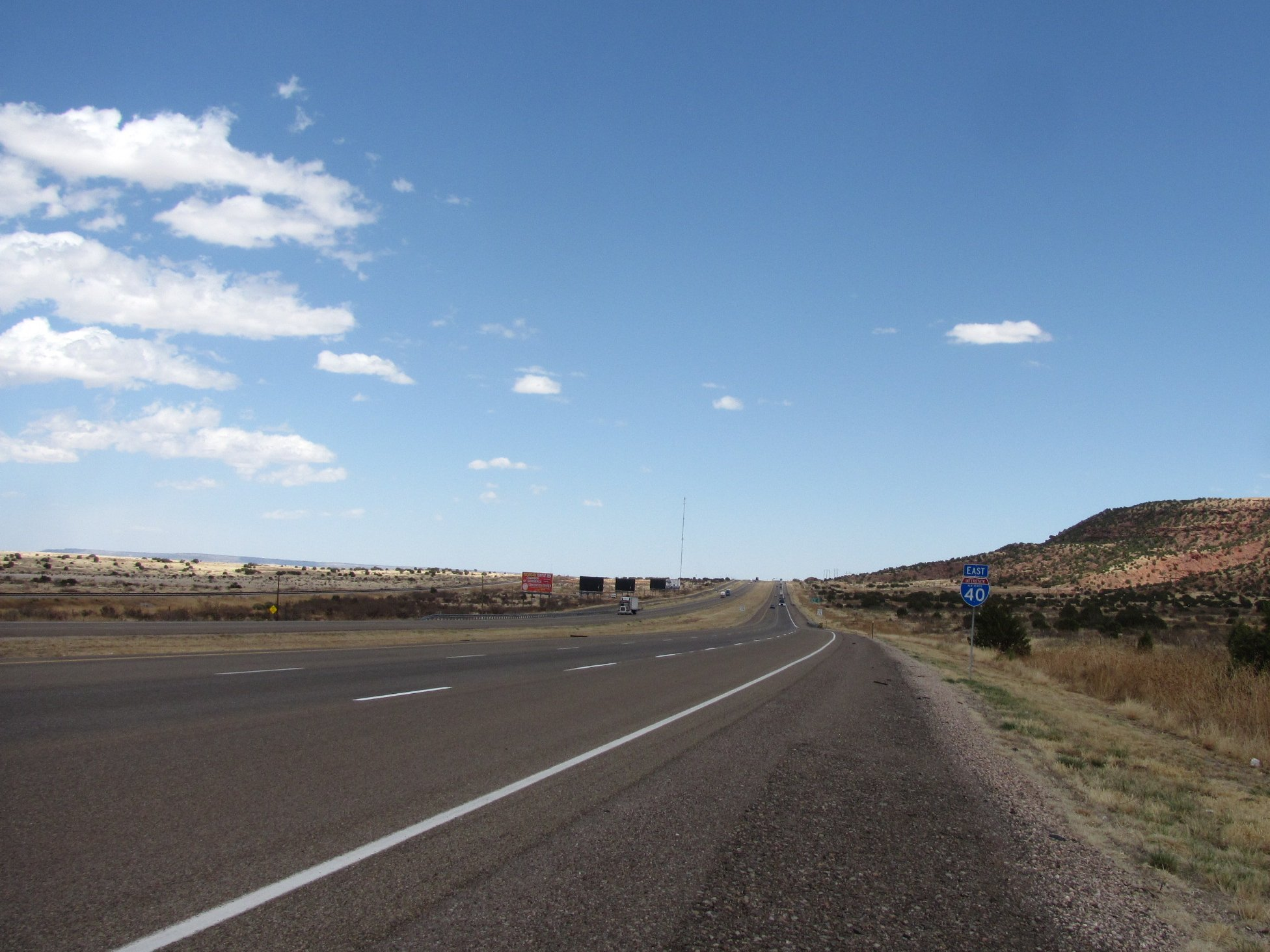
I-40 in eastern New Mexico

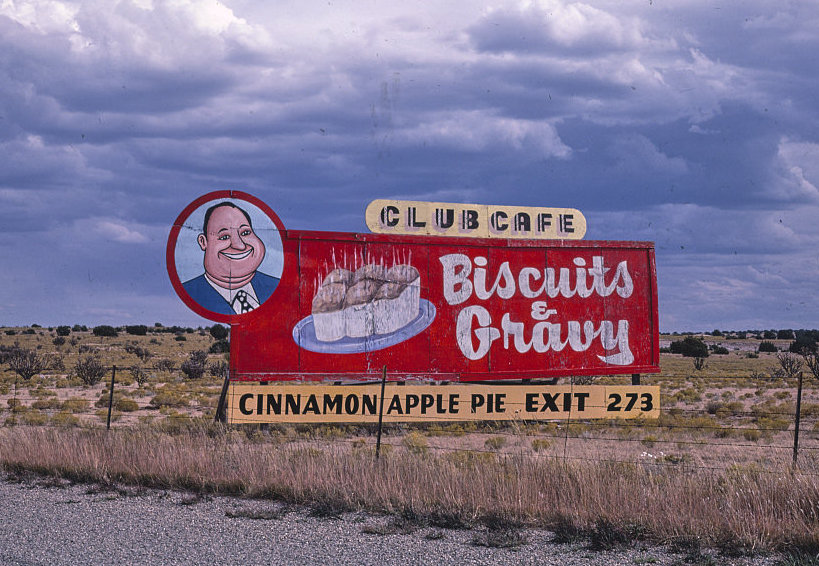
Club Cafe sign near Santa Rosa, exit 273 (1987)

East of Albuquerque, I-40 crosses the Sandia–Manzano Mountains by traversing Tijeras Pass, reaching its highest point of 7,200 feet (2,200 m) at Sedillo Ridge. Continuing east, I-40 descends out of the mountains and into the Estancia Valley while passing through the town of Edgewood (exit 187). The highway continues east across the Estancia Valley, passing through Moriarty (exits 194, 196, and 197). Before reaching Clines Corners, I-40 ascends into the Pedernal Hills, a region of hills and low-level ridgelines averaging around 7,000 feet (2,100 m) in elevation. East of Clines Corners (exit 218), I-40 gradually descends from the Pedrenal Hills region and into the High Plains of eastern New Mexico. At Santa Rosa (exits 273, 275, and 277), I-40 crosses the Pecos River and then continues east-northeastward cosigned with US 54 to Tucumcari. At Tucumcari, I-40 diverges from US 54 and turns eastward and skirts the northern edge of San Jon before reaching the Texas state line at Glenrio.

== History ==
Planning and construction of I-40 through New Mexico began shortly after the Federal Highway Act of 1956 created the Interstate Highway System. First sections of I-40 through the state were completed by 1960, including a short section west of Tucumcari in Quay County, from a point just west of Santa Rosa west past Clines Corners to just east of Moriarty, along with a section on the eastside of Albuquerque and another section from near Cubero to Grants, which included a new spur route connecting the Interstate Highway with US 66 on that city's eastside. Construction of I-40, generally paralleling the existing US 66 in some sections and replacing the older route in others, was hobbled for a few years during this decade by the New Mexico Legislature's passage of an Anti-Bypassing Law that prohibited the construction of an Interstate bypass around a city or town opposed to it. That law was repealed in 1966 following a threat of loss of federal funds and most New Mexico cities along I-40, I-25, and I-10 then worked out agreements with state and federal highway officials in determining where the bypass routes around their municipalities should be located.

By the end of the 1960s, most rural sections of I-40 were completed across the state with the largest exception being a 40-mile (64 km) stretch east of Tucumcari to the Texas border at Glenrio, where traffic was diverted to the old US 66. That section of highway, by this time, became locally and nationally known as "Slaughter Lane" due to tremendous amounts of traffic for a two-lane highway along with rough and narrow paving which led to numerous injury and fatal traffic accidents that reached epidemic numbers in 1968 and 1969. Construction on this section of I-40 was held up by a dispute at San Jon concerning a proposed routing of I-40 bypassing that city to the north by some five miles (8.0 km), which was resolved in November 1969 when federal and state officials agreed to bring the bypass closer to the city along its northern limits. However, aside from a few small villages, such as Montoya, Newkirk, and Cuervo in the eastern portion of the state and Laguna, Budville, and Cubero to the west, no major bypasses had been entirely completed in New Mexico, so traffic was still diverted over the US 66 routes through each of those cities.

In 1970, I-40 was entirely completed through the city of Albuquerque. Other bypasses were completed around various cities through the state, including San Jon (1976) and Tucumcari (1981), Santa Rosa (1972), Moriarty (1973), Grants (1974), and Gallup (1980).

== Exit list ==
County	Location	mi	km	Exit	Destinations	Notes
McKinley		0.00	0.00		I-40 west – Flagstaff	Continuation into Arizona
McKinley		8.36	13.45	8	NM 118 – Defiance, Manuelito	
McKinley	Gallup	16.36	26.33	16	NM 118 – Gallup	Western terminus of former I-40 Bus.
McKinley	Gallup	20.73	33.36	20	US 491 north / NM 602 south (Muñoz Boulevard) – Shiprock, Zuni	US 491/NM 602 not signed westbound; westbound entrance includes direct entrance ramp from Maloney Avenue; former US 666
McKinley	Gallup	22.66	36.47	22	Miyamura Drive / Montoya Boulevard	
McKinley	Gallup	25.83	41.57	26	NM 118 – Gallup	Eastern terminus of former I-40 Bus.
McKinley	McGaffey	33.52	53.95	33	NM 400 – McGaffey	
McKinley	Iyanbito	36.67	59.01	36	NM 118 west – Iyanbito	Eastern terminus of NM 118
McKinley		39.75	63.97	39	Refinery	
McKinley	Coolidge	44.51	71.63	44	Coolidge	
McKinley		47.81	76.94	47	NM 122 east – Continental Divide	Western terminus of NM 122
McKinley	Thoreau	53.17	85.57	53	NM 371 / NM 612 – Thoreau	
McKinley	Prewitt	63.18	101.68	63	NM 412 – Prewitt	
Cibola	Bluewater Village	72.05	115.95	72	NM 606 – Bluewater Village	
Cibola	Milan	78.93	127.03	79	NM 122 to NM 605 – Milan, San Mateo	Western terminus of former I-40 Bus.; access to NM 122 via Horizon Boulevard
Cibola	Grants	81.71	131.50	81	NM 53 to NM 122 – San Rafael, Grants	Signed as exits 81A (south) and 81B (north) eastbound
Cibola	Grants	84.95	136.71	85	NM 122 west to NM 547 – Grants, Mount Taylor	Eastern terminus of NM 122, eastern terminus of former I-40 Bus.
Cibola		89.26	143.65	89	NM 117 – Quemado	
Cibola		96.33	155.03	96	McCartys, Acoma, Sky City	NM 124 not signed; former US 66
Cibola	San Fidel	99.86	160.71	100	San Fidel	
Cibola		101.69	163.65	102	Acomita, Acoma, Sky City	
Cibola		104.60	168.34	104	Cubero, Budville, Seama	
Cibola		107.74	173.39	108	Casa Blanca, Paraje	
Cibola	Laguna	113.99	183.45	114	NM 124 west – Laguna	Eastern terminus of NM 124; former US 66
Cibola		117.47	189.05	117	Mesita	
Cibola		126.53	203.63	126	NM 6 east – Los Lunas	
Cibola	Cañoncito	130.98	210.79	131	To'hajiilee	
Bernalillo		140.05	225.39	140	Rio Puerco	Access to Route 66 Casino and Hotel
Bernalillo		147.5	237.4	147	NM 347 (Paseo del Volcan)	Proposed interchange
Bernalillo		149.25	240.19	149	NM 500 (Atrisco Vista Boulevard)	Western terminus of NM-500, formally known as Paseo del Volcan
Bernalillo	Albuquerque	151.98	244.59	153	98th Street / Arroyo Vista Boulevard	
Bernalillo	Albuquerque	153.10	246.39	154	NM 345 (Unser Boulevard)	
Bernalillo	Albuquerque	154.76	249.06	155	NM 45 (Coors Boulevard)	
Bernalillo	Albuquerque	156.67	252.14	157A	Rio Grande Boulevard	
Bernalillo	Albuquerque	157.39	253.29	157B	12th Street	Eastbound exit and westbound entrance; westbound access via exit 158
Bernalillo	Albuquerque	157.85	254.03	158	8th Street / 6th Street	No westbound entrance
Bernalillo	Albuquerque	158.02	254.31	159A	4th Street / 2nd Street / University Boulevard	Eastbound exit and westbound entrance
Bernalillo	Albuquerque	159.05	255.97	159	I-25 (US 85) – Las Cruces, Santa Fe	Big I interchange; signed as exits 159B (south) and 159C (north); I-25 exits 226A-B; former NM 422; access to Albuquerque International Sunport, Presbyterian Hospital, and Lovelace Medical Center
Bernalillo	Albuquerque	159.38	256.50	159D	University Boulevard / 2nd Street / 4th Street	Westbound exit and eastbound entrance; serves University of New Mexico Hospital
Bernalillo	Albuquerque	160.50	258.30	160	Carlisle Boulevard	
Bernalillo	Albuquerque	161.46	259.84	161	San Mateo Boulevard	Also signed for Kirtland AFB
Bernalillo	Albuquerque	162.62	261.71	162	Louisiana Boulevard	Also signed for NM State Fair
Bernalillo	Albuquerque	163.75	263.53	164	Wyoming Boulevard	
Bernalillo	Albuquerque	164.19	264.24		Lomas Boulevard	Former westbound exit and eastbound entrance from eastbound Lomas Boulevard; replaced by completion of Wyoming Boulevard interchange
Bernalillo	Albuquerque	164.90	265.38	165	Eubank Boulevard	
Bernalillo	Albuquerque	165.97	267.10	166	Juan Tabo Boulevard	
Bernalillo	Albuquerque	167.10– 167.30	268.92– 269.24	167	NM 556 (Tramway Boulevard) / Central Avenue	
Bernalillo		168.87	271.77	170	NM 333 – Carnuel	
Bernalillo		173.90– 177.42	279.86– 285.53	175	NM 14 / NM 337 – Tijeras, Cedar Crest	
Bernalillo	Zuzax	177.17	285.13	178	NM 333 – Zuzax	
Bernalillo	Sedillo	181.04	291.36	181	To NM 217 – Sedillo	
Santa Fe	Edgewood	186.73	300.51	187	NM 344 – Edgewood	
Torrance	Moriarty	194.55	313.10	194	I-40 BL east – Moriarty	
Torrance	Moriarty	195.93	315.32	196	NM 41 (Howard Cavasos Boulevard)	
Torrance	Moriarty	197.33	317.57	197	I-40 BL west – Moriarty	No westbound entrance
Torrance		203.38	327.31	203	Longhorn Ranch	Exit does not sign this destination
Torrance	Wagon Wheel	208.39	335.37	208	Wagon Wheel	
Torrance	Clines Corners	217.59	350.18	218A	Clines Corners	Former westbound exit only (closed and removed 2015)
Torrance	Clines Corners	217.59	350.18	218	US 285 – Vaughn, Santa Fe	
Torrance		225.81	363.41	226	Palma	Exit does not sign this destination
Torrance		230.17	370.42	230	NM 3 – Encino, Villanueva	
Torrance		233.71	376.12	234	Flying C	Exit does not sign this destination; westbound has two separate exits with the same number and destination
Torrance		238.69	384.13	239	McKenzie	Exit does not sign this destination
Guadalupe		242.83	390.80	243	Milagro	Exit does not sign this destination; signed as exits 243B and 243A westbound
Guadalupe		251.58	404.88	Eastbound Rest Stop		
Guadalupe		251.58	404.88	Vaughn Route 66 Rest Stop; exit 252		
Guadalupe	Vegas Junction	255.86	411.77	256	US 84 north / NM 219 south – Las Vegas, Pastura	Northern terminus of NM 219; western end of US 84 concurrency
Guadalupe	San Ignacio	262.83	422.98	263	San Ignacio	
Guadalupe	Colonias	267.16	429.95	267	Colonias	
Guadalupe	Santa Rosa	272.38	438.35	273	I-40 BL east / US 84 south to US 54 south – Santa Rosa	Eastern end of US 84 concurrency; I-40 Bus. not signed westbound
Guadalupe	Santa Rosa	274.37	441.56	275	I-40 BL / US 54 / US 84 – Santa Rosa	Routes not signed, exit signed for Santa Rosa
Guadalupe	Santa Rosa	276.19	444.48	277	I-40 BL west / US 54 south / US 84 south – Fort Sumner, Santa Rosa	Western end of US 54 concurrency; I-40 Bus./US 54 not signed eastbound
Guadalupe		283.96	456.99	284	Frontier Museum	Exit does not sign this destination
Guadalupe	Cuervo	290.61– 291.21	467.69– 468.66	291	Cuervo	
Guadalupe	Newkirk	299.27	481.63	300	NM 129 – Newkirk	
Quay	Montoya	310.72	500.06	311	Montoya	
Quay	Palomas	321.13	516.81	321	Palomas	
Quay	Tucumcari	328.43	528.56	329	I-40 BL	Western terminus of I-40 Bus.
Quay	Tucumcari	330.30	531.57	331	Camino del Coronado	
Quay	Tucumcari	331.45	533.42	332	NM 209 to NM 104 (1st Street)	
Quay	Tucumcari	332.80	535.59	333	US 54 east (Mountain Road)	Eastern end of US 54 concurrency
Quay	Tucumcari	334.67	538.60	335	I-40 BL	
Quay		337.81	543.65	339	NM 278	
Quay		343.13	552.21	343	Quay Road AD	Exit does not sign this road
Quay	San Jon	355.25	571.72	356	NM 469 – San Jon	
Quay	Bard	360.35	579.93	361	Bard	
Quay	Endee	369.02	593.88	369	NM 93 south / NM 392 north – Endee	
Quay	Glenrio	372.52	599.51		I-40 east – Amarillo	Continuation into Texas
1.000 mi = 1.609 km; 1.000 km = 0.621 mi: Closed/former; Concurrency terminus; Incomplete access

== See also ==
- Albuquerque Northwest Loop

Interstate 40
Previous state: Arizona	New Mexico	Next state: Texas
