= New Mexico State Road 14 =

State highway in New Mexico, United States

State Road 14
- NM 14 highlighted in red

Route information
- Maintained by NMDOT
- Length: 53.957 mi (86.835 km)
- Tourist routes: Turquoise Trail

Major junctions
- South end: NM 333 / Historic US 66 in Tijeras
- I-40 in Tijeras; NM 536 in San Antonito; NM 344 in Golden; NM 599 near Santa Fe; I-25 / US 85 near Santa Fe; NM 466 in Santa Fe
- North end: US 84 / US 285 in Santa Fe

Location
- Country: United States
- State: New Mexico
- Counties: Bernalillo, Sandoval, Santa Fe

Highway system
- New Mexico State Highway System; Interstate; US; State; Scenic
← NM 13	→ NM 15
← I-10	→ NM 11

New Mexico State Road 14 (NM 14) is an approximately 54-mile-long (87 km) state road located in northern New Mexico. The highway connects Albuquerque to Santa Fe and comprises most of the Turquoise Trail, a National Scenic Byway which also includes NM 536 (Sandia Crest Scenic Byway).

== Route description ==
NM 14 begins at the intersection with NM 333 in Tijeras, which is also the center of the Tijeras interchange along Interstate 40 (I-40). NM 14 heads north through Bernalillo County, passing through the community of Cedar Crest, to San Antonito, where it intersects NM 536.

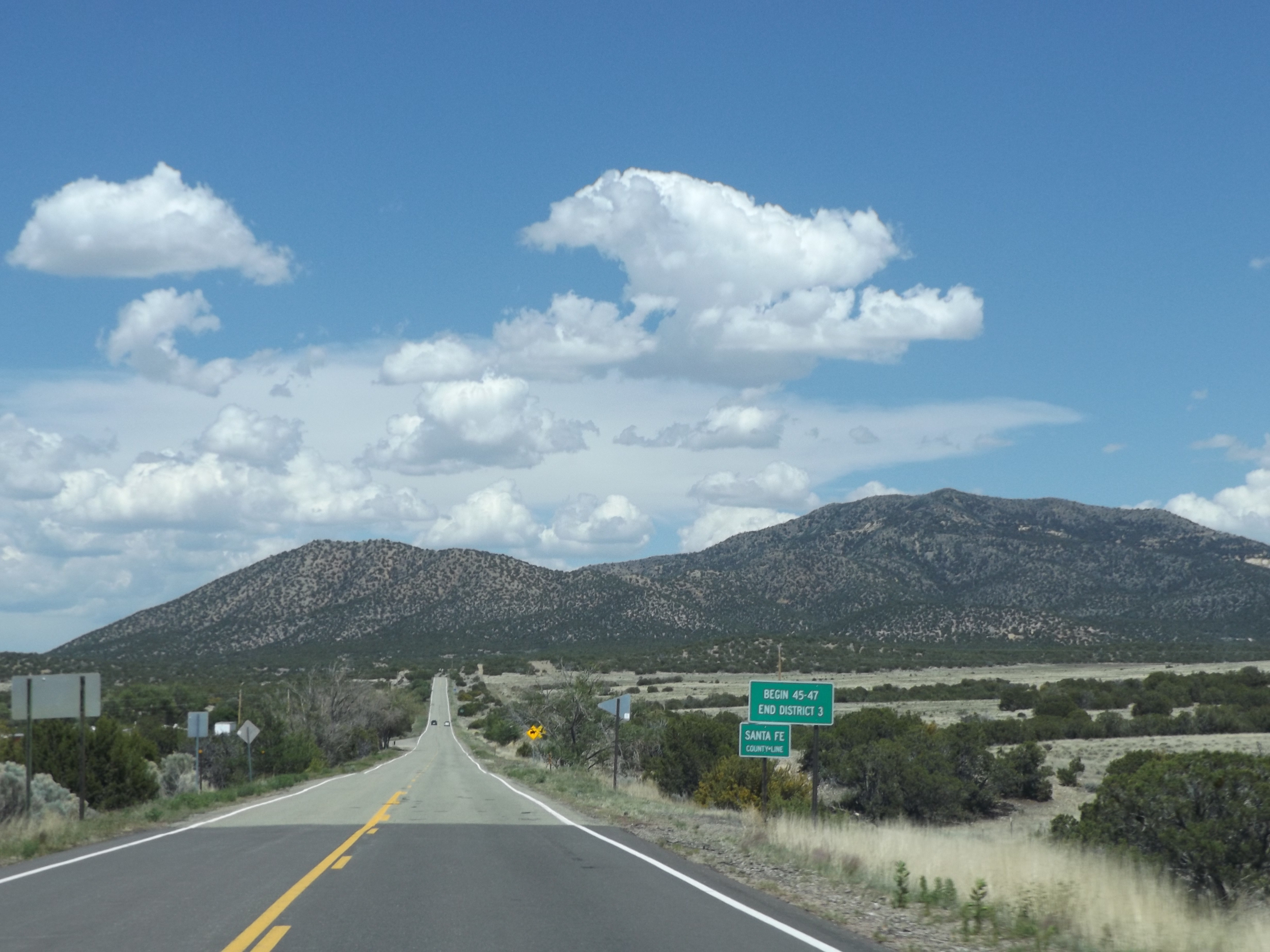
NM 14 northbound as it enters Santa Fe County

The highway continues northeast and briefly cuts through Sandoval County by entering from the south and leaving from the east. Now in Santa Fe County, NM 14 turns to the north. It intersects NM 344 west of Oro Quay Peak, both of which are located south of the ghost town of Golden.

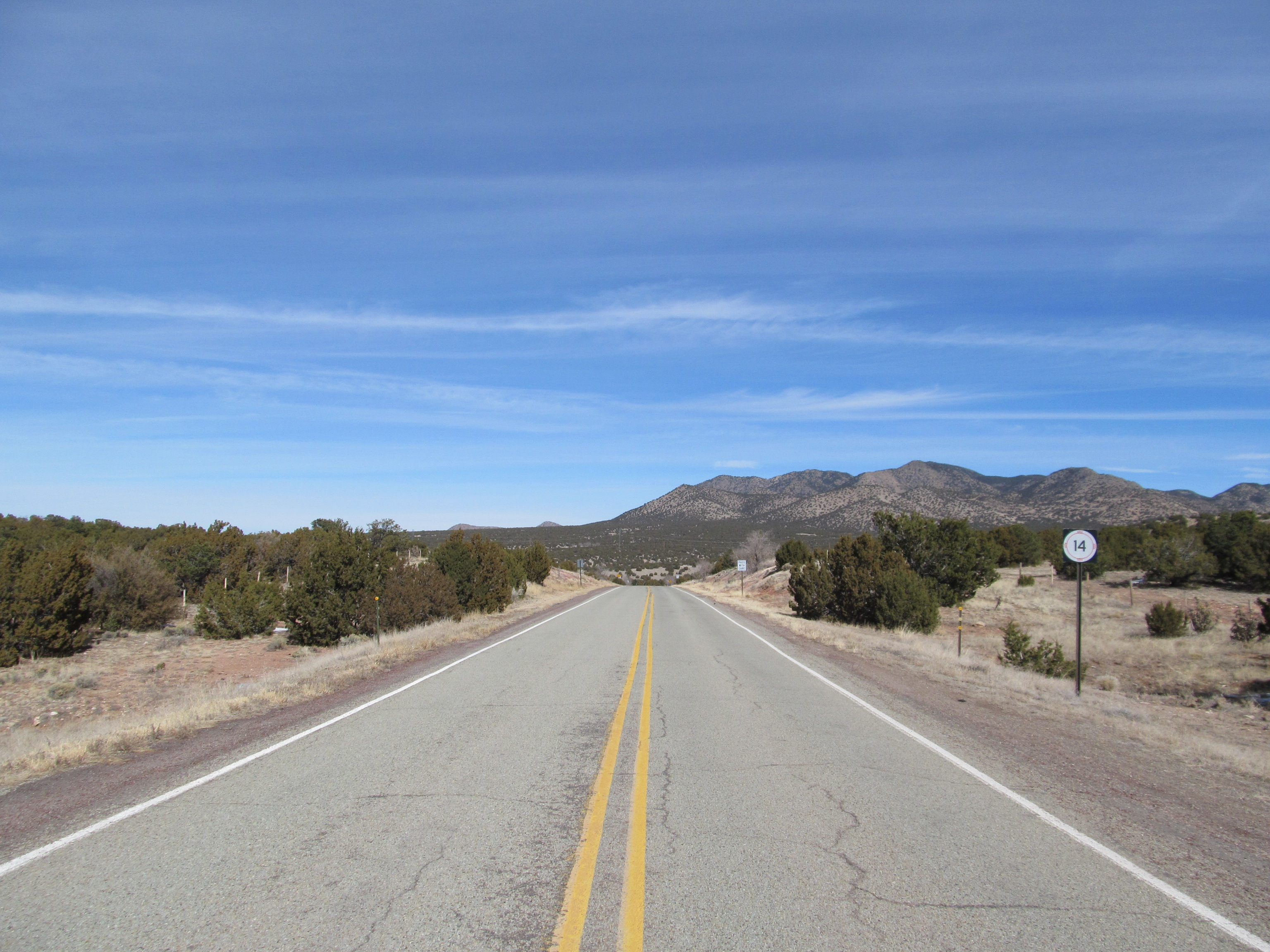
Northbound near Golden

== History ==
State Road 10
- Location: Carrizozo to Santa Fe
- Existed: 1927–1970

State Road 10 (NM 10) had been established before 1927 between Albuquerque and Santa Fe. By 1927, part of NM 10 was replaced by US 470 from Tijeras to Albuquerque, but the northern terminus remained at US 85 in Santa Fe. By 1930, the end of NM 10 was at US 66. In 1935, NM 10 was extended south to NM 15 near Tajique. NM 15 was later absorbed into a further southern extension of NM 10 to US 54 in Carrizozo. By 1949, this highway was mostly paved.

Originally, the NM 14 designation was serviced by a road between the Arizona–New Mexico state line and US 80 in Road Forks. NM 14 along with SR 86 in Arizona provided a shortcut to US 80 between Benson, Arizona and Road Forks, due to US 80 taking a loop to Douglas, Arizona. The original NM 14 was replaced by Interstate 10 in 1960.

In 1970, the NM 14 designation was recycled and used to re-number NM 10, to avoid numbering confusion with I-10. During the 1988 re-numbering, NM 14 was extended along former US 85 through Santa Fe to US 84 and US 285, while the concurrency with NM 333 was eliminated. The sections of NM 14 south of NM 333 were renumbered NM 337 and NM 55 respectively.

== Major intersections ==
County	Location	mi	km	Destinations	Notes
Bernalillo	Tijeras	0.000	0.000	NM 333 / Historic US 66 to I-40 east – Albuquerque, Edgewood	Southern terminus; to I-40 eastbound
Bernalillo	Tijeras	0.080	0.129	I-40 west	I-40 exit 175, westbound only; access to I-40 eastbound via NM 333
Bernalillo	San Antonito	6.015	9.680	NM 536 west – Sandia Park, Sandia Peak	Eastern terminus of NM 536
Sandoval	No major junctions				
Santa Fe	Golden	15.748	25.344	NM 344 south – Edgewood	Northern terminus of NM 344
Santa Fe		44.900	72.260	NM 599 north (Santa Fe Bypass)	Southern terminus of NM 599
Santa Fe		46.675	75.116	I-25 / US 85 – Albuquerque, Las Vegas	I-25 Exit 278
Santa Fe	Santa Fe	52.252	84.091	NM 466 east (Saint Michaels Drive)	Western terminus of NM 466
Santa Fe	Santa Fe	53.957	86.835	US 84 / US 285 (Saint Francis Drive)	Northern terminus
1.000 mi = 1.609 km; 1.000 km = 0.621 mi: Incomplete access
