= New Mexico State Road 472 =

State highway in Santa Fe County, New Mexico, US

State Road 472

Route information
- Maintained by NMDOT
- Length: 11.975 mi (19.272 km)

Major junctions
- West end: NM 344 near Edgewood
- East end: NM 41 in Stanley

Location
- Country: United States
- State: New Mexico
- Counties: Santa Fe

Highway system
- New Mexico State Highway System; Interstate; US; State; Scenic
← NM 469	→ NM 473

State Road 472 (NM 472) is a 11.975-mile-long (19.272 km) state highway in the US state of New Mexico. NM 472's western terminus is at NM 344 north of Edgewood, and the eastern terminus is at NM 41 in Stanley.

== Major intersections ==
The entire route is in Santa Fe County.

Location	mi	km	Destinations	Notes
Cedar Grove	0.000	0.000	NM 344	Western terminus
Stanley	11.975	19.272	NM 41	Eastern terminus
1.000 mi = 1.609 km; 1.000 km = 0.621 mi
