= New Mexico State Road 469 =

State highway in New Mexico, United States

State Road 469

Route information
- Maintained by NMDOT
- Length: 43.553 mi (70.092 km)

Major junctions
- South end: NM 209 in Grady
- I-40 in San Jon
- North end: US 54 in Logan

Location
- Country: United States
- State: New Mexico
- Counties: Curry, Quay

Highway system
- New Mexico State Highway System; Interstate; US; State; Scenic
← NM 468	→ NM 472

State Road 469 (NM 469) is a 43.553-mile-long (70.092 km) state highway in the US state of New Mexico. NM 469's southern terminus is at NM 209 in Grady, and the northern terminus is at U.S. Route 54 (US 54) in Logan.

== Major intersections ==
County	Location	mi	km	Destinations	Notes
Curry	Grady	0.000	0.000	NM 209	Southern terminus
Quay	San Jon	23.800– 23.900	38.302– 38.463	I-40	I-40 exit 356
Quay	Porter	31.062	49.989	NM 392 south	Northern terminus of NM 392
Quay	Logan	43.553	70.092	US 54	Northern terminus
1.000 mi = 1.609 km; 1.000 km = 0.621 mi
