= New Mexico State Road 344 =

State highway in New Mexico, United States

State Road 344

Route information
- Maintained by NMDOT
- Length: 17.372 mi (27.958 km)
- Existed: 1950s–present

Major junctions
- South end: Historic US 66 / NM 333 in Edgewood
- I-40 in Edgewood
- North end: NM 14 near Golden

Location
- Country: United States
- State: New Mexico
- Counties: Santa Fe

Highway system
- New Mexico State Highway System; Interstate; US; State; Scenic
← NM 343	→ NM 345

State Road 344 (NM 344) is a 17.4-mile-long (28.0 km) state highway in the US state of New Mexico. NM 344's southern terminus is at NM 333 and Historic US 66 in Edgewood, and the northern terminus is at NM 14 south-southwest of Golden.

== Major intersections ==
The entire route is in Santa Fe County.

Location	mi	km	Destinations	Notes
Edgewood	0.000	0.000	Historic US 66 / NM 333	Southern terminus
Edgewood	0.190	0.306	I-40	I-40 exit 187
	5.320	8.562	NM 472 east	Western terminus of NM 472
	17.372	27.958	NM 14	Northern terminus
1.000 mi = 1.609 km; 1.000 km = 0.621 mi
