= New Mexico State Road 41 =

State highway in New Mexico, United States

State Road 41

Route information
- Maintained by NMDOT
- Length: 62.02 mi (99.81 km)

Major junctions
- South end: US 60 in Willard
- NM 55 in Estancia; I-40 in Moriarty
- North end: US 285 in Lamy

Location
- Country: United States
- State: New Mexico
- Counties: Torrance, Santa Fe

Highway system
- New Mexico State Highway System; Interstate; US; State; Scenic
← I-40	→ NM 42

State Road 41 (NM 41) is a state highway in the US state of New Mexico. Its total length is approximately 62 miles (100 km). NM 41's southern terminus is in the village of Willard at U.S. Route 60 (US 60), and the northern terminus is in the village of Lamy at US 285.

== Major intersections ==
County	Location	mi	km	Destinations	Notes
Torrance	Willard	0.000	0.000	US 60	Southern terminus
Torrance		4.620	7.435	NM 542 south	Northern terminus of NM 542
Torrance	Estancia	10.600	17.059	NM 55 south	Northern terminus of NM 55
Torrance	Moriarty	28.184	45.358	I-40 BL	
Torrance	Moriarty	28.434	45.760	I-40	I-40 exit 196
Santa Fe	Stanley	38.208	61.490	NM 472 west	Eastern terminus of NM 472
Santa Fe	Lamy	62.091	99.926	US 285	Northern terminus
1.000 mi = 1.609 km; 1.000 km = 0.621 mi
