= Bard, New Mexico =

Unincorporated community in Quay County, New Mexico, United States

Bard
- Unincorporated community
- Interstate 40 in Bard

- Location within the state of New Mexico Location within the United States
- Coordinates: 35°7′43″N 103°14′44″W
- Country: United States
- State: New Mexico
- County: Quay
- Elevation: 4,000 ft (1,200 m)
- Time zone: UTC-7 (Mountain (MST))
  - Summer (DST): UTC-6 (MDT)
- ZIP codes: 88411
- Area code: 575
- FIPS code: 35-35037
- GNIS feature ID: 932912

Bard is an unincorporated community in Quay County, New Mexico, United States.

== Description ==
Bard is located at Exit 361 off Interstate 40, about 31 miles (50 km) east of Tucumcari, the county seat of Quay County. From October 8, 1909, to April 23, 1913, the community was officially known as Bard City. Bard had a post office from January 30, 1908, to November 26, 1991; it still has its own ZIP code, 88411. The town also had a gas station and repair garage. In 1946, Bard had a population of 26.
