= New Mexico State Road 55 =

State highway in New Mexico, United States

State Road 55

Route information
- Maintained by NMDOT
- Length: 96.844 mi (155.855 km)

Major junctions
- South end: US 54 near Ancho
- US 60 in Mountainair
- North end: NM 41 in Estancia

Location
- Country: United States
- State: New Mexico
- Counties: Lincoln, Socorro, Torrance

Highway system
- New Mexico State Highway System; Interstate; US; State; Scenic
← US 54	→ US 56
← NM 53	→ NM 57

State Road 55 (NM 55) is a state highway in the US state of New Mexico. Its total length is approximately 96.8 miles (155.8 km). NM 55's southern terminus is at U.S. Route 54 (US 55) west-northwest of Ancho and the northern terminus is in the village of Estancia at NM 41.

== History ==
In the 1930s, the section of highway between Cuba and Farmington was known as NM 55. By 1940, NM 44 was moved to the road NM 55 followed, and the NM 55 designation was removed. In the early 1940s the portion from Estancia to Tajique was named NM 55 when NM 10 (later NM 14) was extended south over the remainder of NM 15. For a brief time in the early 1940s, the segment between Claunch and US 54 was designated NM 195. In 1988, NM 14 was broken up into several routes to eliminate concurrent segments with other routes, and NM-55 assumed the former portion of NM 14 south of Tajique. Currently it covers the entire length of the original route NM 15.

== Major intersections ==
County	Location	mi	km	Destinations	Notes
Lincoln		0.000	0.000	US 54	Southern terminus
Socorro	No major junctions				
Torrance	Mountainair	61.988	99.760	US 60	
Torrance		67.120	108.019	NM 542 north	Southern terminus of NM 542
Torrance	Manzano	74.435	119.792	NM 131 south	Northern terminus of NM 131
Torrance		86.468	139.157	NM 337 north	Southern terminus of NM 337
Torrance	Estancia	96.844	155.855	NM 41	Northern terminus
1.000 mi = 1.609 km; 1.000 km = 0.621 mi
