= New Mexico State Road 542 =

State highway in New Mexico, United States

State Road 542
- NM 542 highlighted in red

Route information
- Maintained by NMDOT
- Length: 15.2 mi (24.5 km)

Major junctions
- South end: NM 55 near Tatum
- North end: NM 41 near Willard

Location
- Country: United States
- State: New Mexico
- Counties: Torrance

Highway system
- New Mexico State Highway System; Interstate; US; State; Scenic
← NM 540	→ NM 545

State Road 542 (NM 542) is a 15.2-mile-long (24.5 km) state highway in the US state of New Mexico. NM 542's southern terminus is at NM 55 north of Tatum, and the northern terminus is at NM 41 north-northwest of Willard.

== Major intersections ==
The entire route is in Torrance County.

Location	mi	km	Destinations	Notes
	0.000	0.000	NM 55	Southern terminus
	15.200	24.462	NM 41	Northern terminus
1.000 mi = 1.609 km; 1.000 km = 0.621 mi
