= Zuzax, New Mexico =

Unincorporated community in New Mexico, US

Coordinates: 35°6′18″N 106°20′21″W

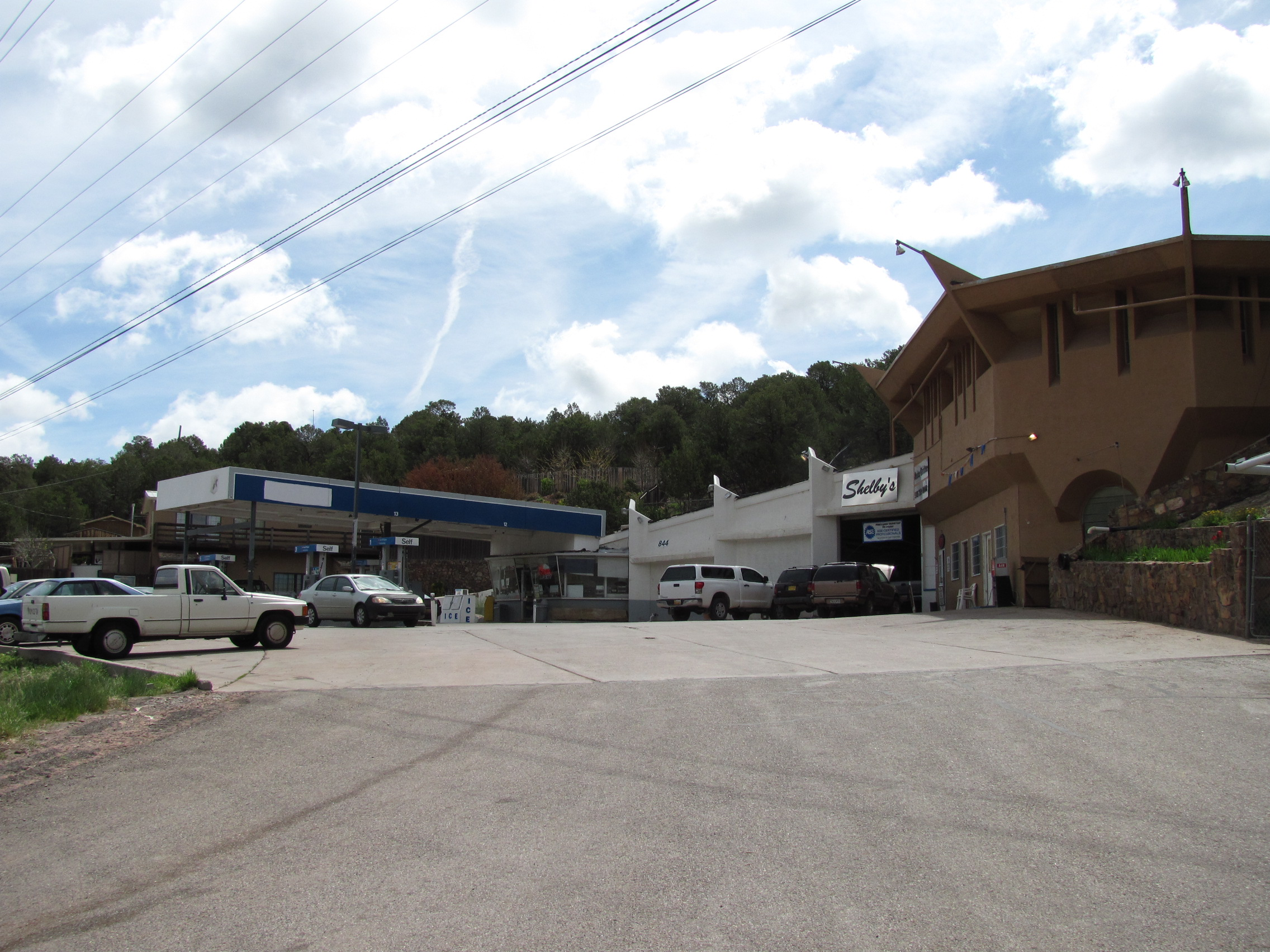
East Mountain Ready Mart in Zuzax

Zuzax is an unincorporated community in Bernalillo County, New Mexico, United States. It lies on NM 333 (former US 66), about eleven miles (18 km) east of Albuquerque. It is now largely an area of subdivisions. An exit for Zuzax exists on nearby I-40.

== History ==
The name was coined by entrepreneur Herman Ardans, who opened a curio shop in the area around 1956 and named it so that it would be the final entry in phone books. There was also a short chairlift ride which ascended a small hill behind the store.

== Geography ==
Zuzax is just to the west of the Sandia Mountain Range and the Cibola National Forest, located in the forested foothills. Zuzax is at an elevation of 6,585 feet (2,007 meters).

== Education ==
Zuzax is zoned within the Albuquerque Public Schools District.

== See also ==
- Zzyzx, California, another American community with an unusual invented name
