= Albuquerque Northwest Loop =

The Albuquerque Northwest Loop is a projected highway in New Mexico's Bernalillo and Sandoval counties. The road, which would be built in a rural area, is projected to connect U.S. Route 550 (US 550) near Rio Rancho to Interstate 40 (I-40) near the Rio Puerco (approximately 15 miles (24 km) from central Albuquerque). It is mentioned in a transportation plan geared towards the year 2030 produced by the Mid-Region Council of Governments and would likely be funded by mostly private sources. The projected cost of the first phase of construction is $52,890,000, later stages are projected to amount to approximately $70,000,000. The two-lane highway would initially have a gravel surface; the 300-foot-long (91 m) right-of-way could accommodate the expansion of the road into a freeway if needed due to future growth.

The announcement of a federal environmental assessment concerning the 39-mile-long (63 km) corridor reignited old controversies over the planned road. Some proponents of the road argue that it will ease traffic congestion in metropolitan Albuquerque and facilitate the economic development of the region, creating many jobs. Some opponents of the road argue that it would induce sprawl and that the inclusion of public money to develop the road would be an unfair subsidy to the developers who own the land around it. Some planners point out that traffic projections show that there is no need for the 300-foot (91 m) right-of-way, which was given to Sandoval and Bernalillo counties in the early 1990s by the landowners, while backers claim that the road will nonetheless have to be built to serve the eventual development that is planned for the area.
