= Cañoncito, Bernalillo County, New Mexico =

Cañoncito, New Mexico
- Unincorporated community
- Location within New Mexico
- Coordinates: 35°08′13″N 106°22′24″W
- Country: United States
- State: New Mexico
- County: Bernalillo
- Elevation: 7,001 ft (2,134 m)
- Time zone: UTC-7 (Mountain (MST))
  - Summer (DST): UTC-6 (MDT)
- Area code: 505
- GNIS feature ID: 904703

Cañoncito is an unincorporated community in Bernalillo County, New Mexico, United States. Cañoncito is located along New Mexico State Road 14 13.5 miles (21.7 km) east of central Albuquerque.
