= Wagon Wheel, New Mexico =

Ghost town in New Mexico

- Unincorporated community
- Location within New Mexico Location within the United States
- Coordinates: 35°00′18″N 105°49′21″W
- Country: United States
- State: New Mexico
- County: Torrance
- Elevation: 6,575 ft (2,004 m)
- Time zone: UTC-7 (Mountain (MST))
  - Summer (DST): UTC-6 (MDT)
- Area code: 505
- GNIS feature ID: 924956

Wagon Wheel is an unincorporated community in Torrance County, New Mexico, United States. The community is located at exit 208 of Interstate 40, 12 miles (19 km) east of Moriarty, and provides services for travelers on the highway.
