= New Mexico State Road 345 =

State highway in Bernalillo County, New Mexico

State Road 345
- Unser Boulevard

Route information
- Maintained by NMDOT
- Length: 3.645 mi (5.866 km)

Major junctions
- South end: Central Avenue in Albuquerque
- I-40 in Albuquerque
- North end: St. Josephs Avenue in Albuquerque

Location
- Country: United States
- State: New Mexico
- Counties: Bernalillo

Highway system
- New Mexico State Highway System; Interstate; US; State; Scenic
← NM 344	→ NM 346

State Road 345 (NM 345) is a 3.6-mile-long (5.8 km) state highway in the US state of New Mexico. NM 345's southern terminus is at Central Avenue in Albuquerque, and the northern terminus is at Saint Josephs Avenue. NM 345 runs concurrent with the central portion of Unser Boulevard in Albuquerque, named in tribute to locally-born auto racer Al Unser.

== Major intersections ==
The entire route is in Albuquerque, Bernalillo County.

mi	km	Destinations	Notes
0.000	0.000	Central Avenue	Southern terminus
1.059– 1.469	1.704– 2.364	I-40	I-40 exit 154
3.645	5.866	St. Josephs Avenue	Northern terminus
1.000 mi = 1.609 km; 1.000 km = 0.621 mi
