= New Mexico State Road 545 =

State highway in New Mexico, United States

State Road 545
- NM 545 highlighted in red

Route information
- Maintained by NMDOT
- Length: 2.5 mi (4.0 km)

Major junctions
- West end: US 54 / US 70 near Alamogordo
- East end: End of state maintenance (intersection with Main Street and La Luz Road) in La Luz

Location
- Country: United States
- State: New Mexico
- Counties: Otero

Highway system
- New Mexico State Highway System; Interstate; US; State; Scenic
← NM 542	→ NM 546

State Road 545 (NM 545) is a 2.5-mile-long (4.0 km) state highway in the US state of New Mexico. NM 545's western terminus is at U.S. Route 54 (US 54) north of Alamogordo, and the eastern terminus is at the end of state maintenance at an intersection with Main Street and La Luz Road in La Luz.

== Major intersections ==
The entire route is in Otero County.

Location	mi	km	Destinations	Notes
	0.000	0.000	US 54 / US 70	Western terminus
La Luz	2.500	4.023	End of state maintenance	Eastern terminus
1.000 mi = 1.609 km; 1.000 km = 0.621 mi
