= San Jon, New Mexico =

- Village
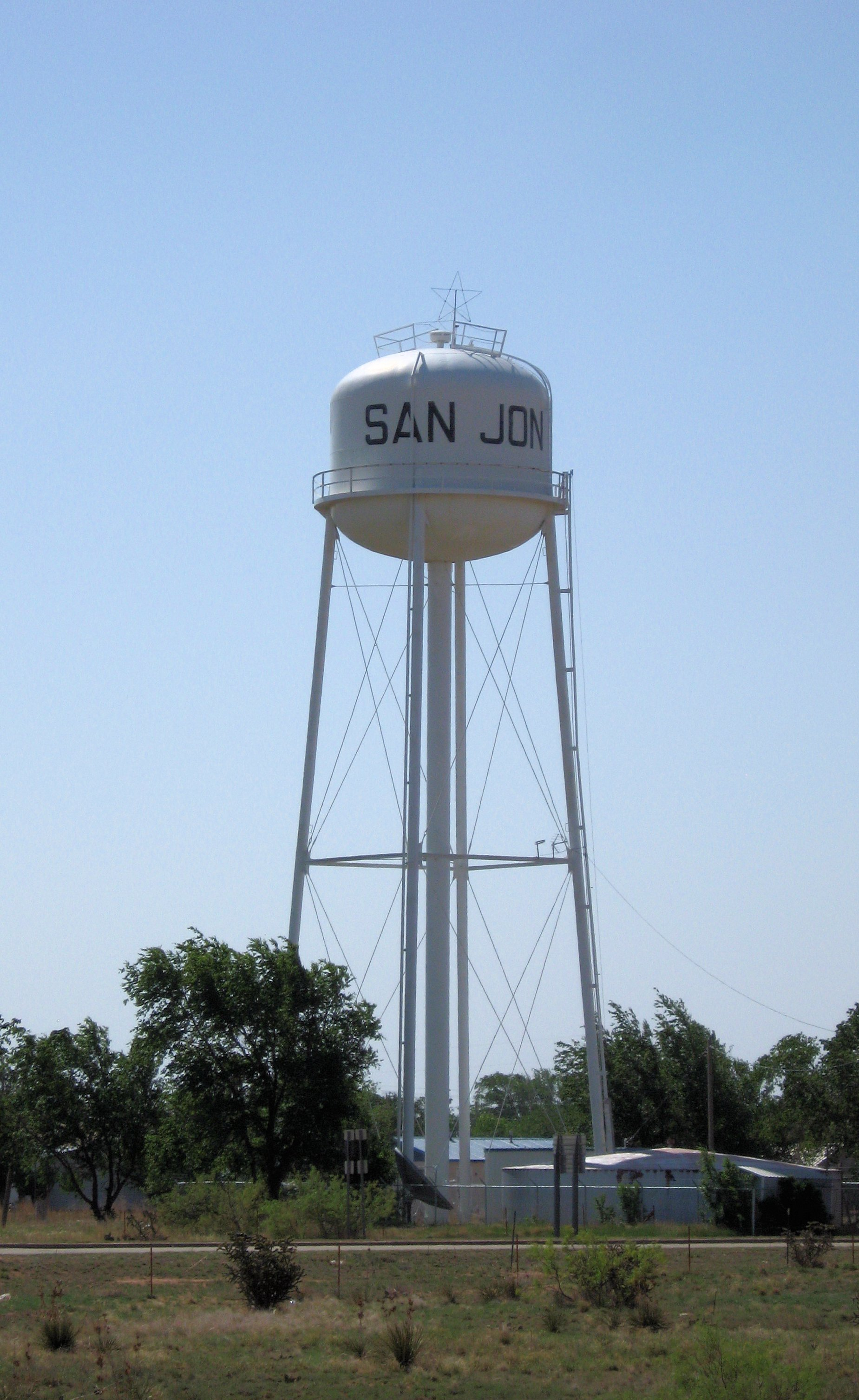
- Water tower in San Jon

- Location of San Jon, New Mexico

- Location in the United States
- Coordinates: 35°07′12″N 103°19′52″W
- Country: United States
- State: New Mexico
- County: Quay

Area
  - Total: 2.93 sq mi (7.58 km^{2})
  - Land: 2.93 sq mi (7.58 km^{2})
  - Water: 0 sq mi (0.00 km^{2})
- Elevation: 4,029 ft (1,228 m)

Population (2020)
  - Total: 195
  - Density: 67/sq mi (26/km^{2})
- Time zone: UTC-7 (Mountain (MST))
  - Summer (DST): UTC-6 (MDT)
- ZIP codes: 88411, 88434
- Area code: 575
- FIPS code: 35-68150
- GNIS feature ID: 2413587

San Jon (/ˌsæn ˈhoʊn/) is a village in Quay County, New Mexico, United States. The population was 195 at the 2020 census.

== History ==
The village was founded in 1902 and grew after the arrival of the railroad in 1904. It was once an important local commercial center and stop on U.S. Route 66 and home to numerous tourist-oriented businesses, such as gasoline service stations, cafes, and motels. However, when Interstate 40 bypassed the village in 1981, the local economy declined, leading most of those businesses to shut down. Today, only one motel is still in operation, and all of the gas stations and dining establishments are centered around the I-40 interchange on the north side of town. Former establishments include The Old Route 66 Truck and Auto Parts garage, Smith's Café, and the Circle M Motel.

== Geography ==
According to the United States Census Bureau, the village has a total area of 2.6 square miles (6.7 km^{2}), all land.

The village is located on I-40 at New Mexico State Highway 469, east of Tucumcari.

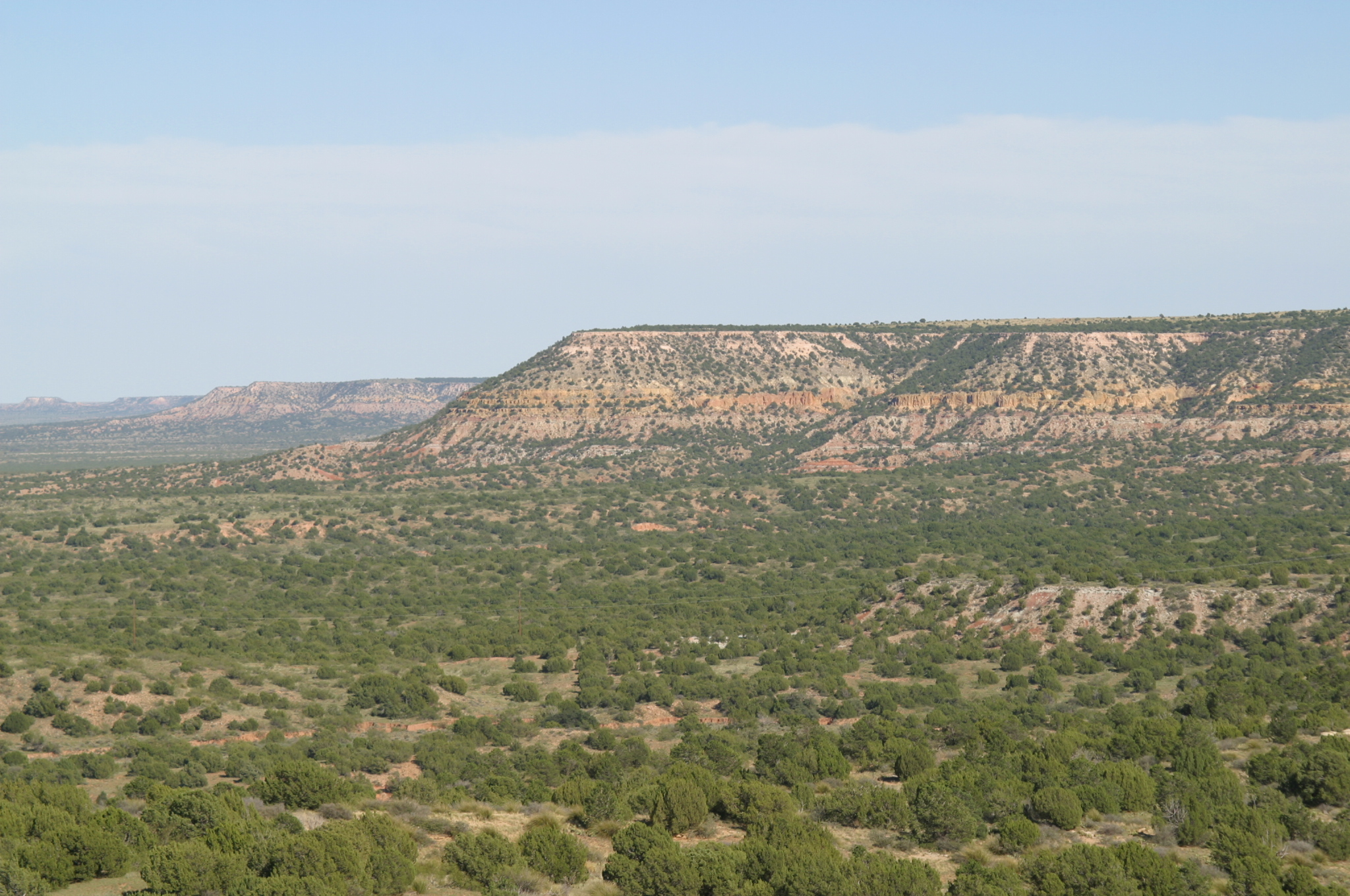
Northern escarpment of the Llano Estacado, located 9 mi (14 km) south of San Jon.

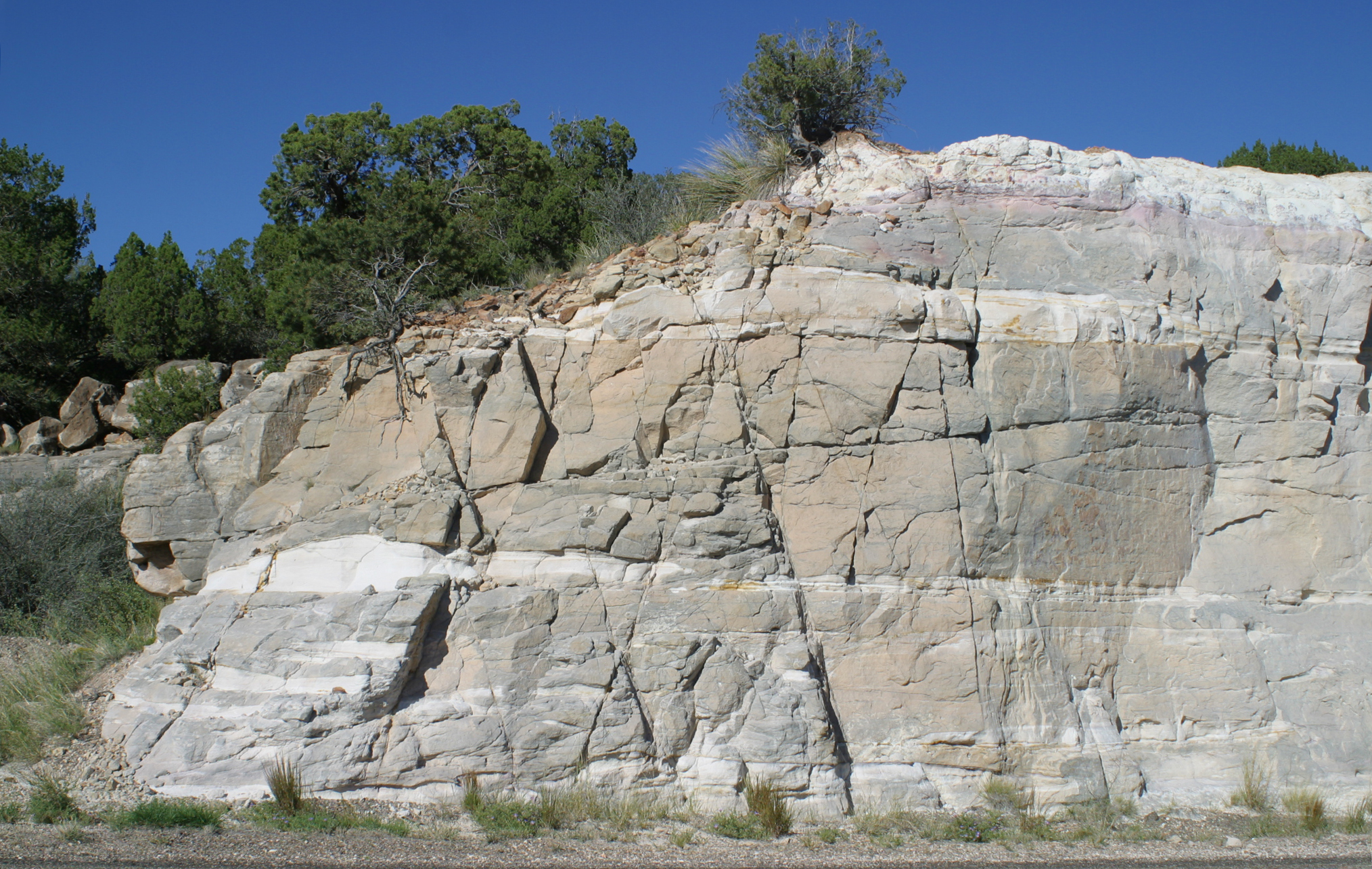
Road cut south of San Jon on New Mexico State Highway 469 as it crosses the Caprock Escarpment at the northern edge of the Llano Estacado.

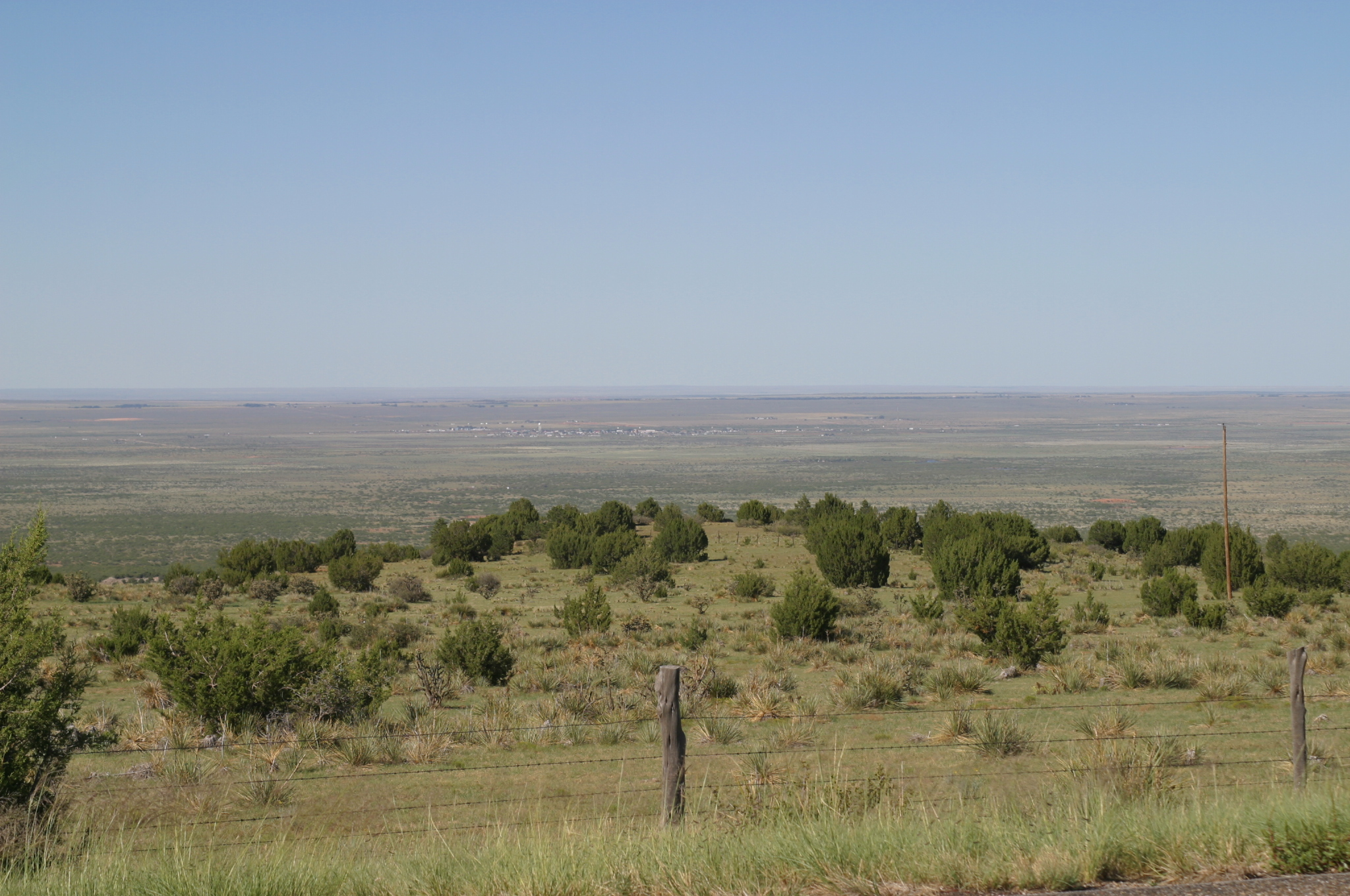
View of San Jon, looking north from the caprock escarpment of the Llano Estacado

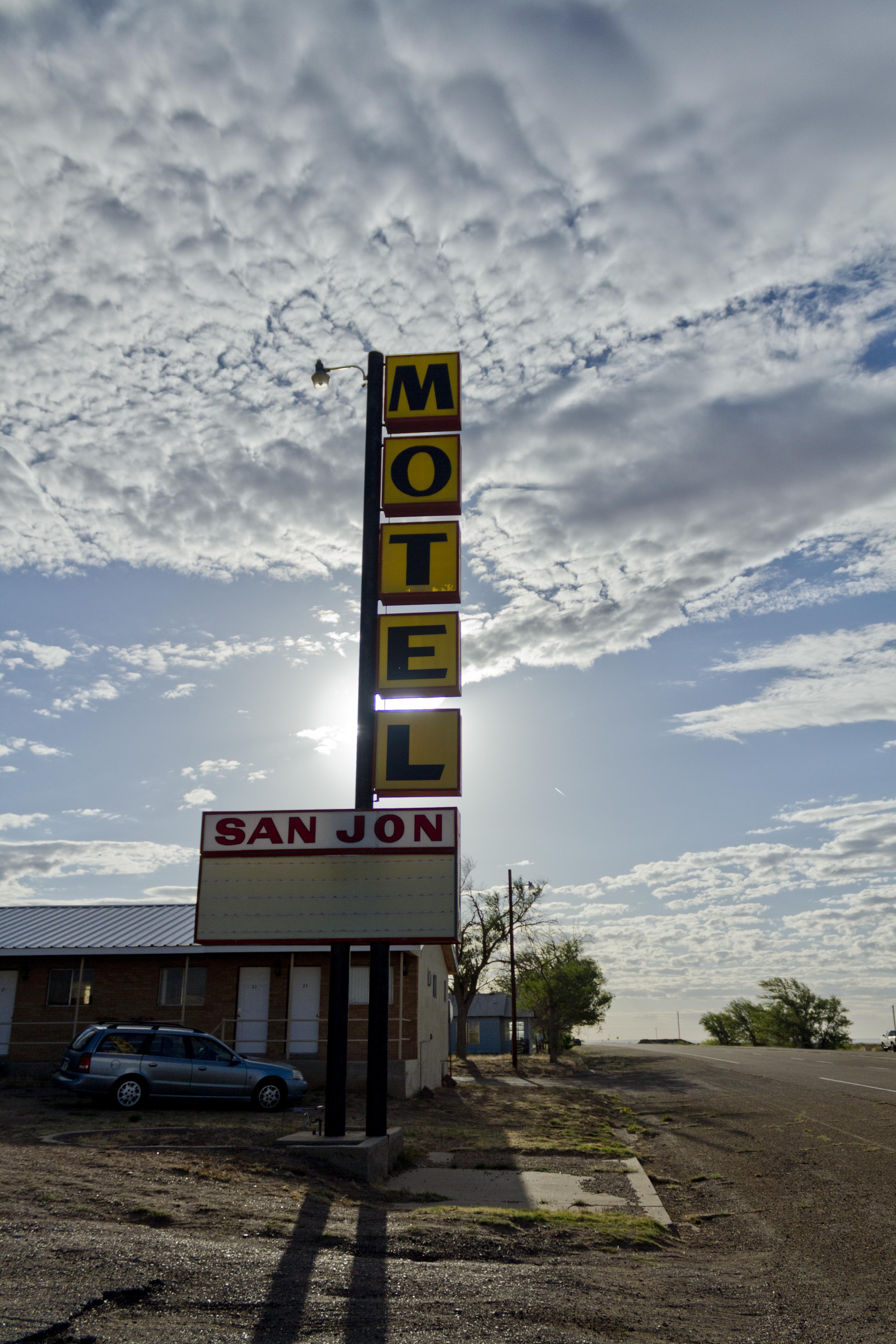
The lone motel of San Jon, established in 1946.

=== Climate ===
According to the Köppen Climate Classification system, San Jon has a cold semi-arid climate, abbreviated "BSk" on climate maps. The hottest temperature recorded in San Jon was 111 °F (43.9 °C) on July 11, 2020, and July 13, 2020, while the coldest temperature recorded was −20 °F (−28.9 °C) on January 1, 1919.

Climate data for San Jon, New Mexico, 1991–2020 normals, extremes 1907–2021
Month	Jan	Feb	Mar	Apr	May	Jun	Jul	Aug	Sep	Oct	Nov	Dec	Year
Record high °F (°C)	83 (28)	86 (30)	91 (33)	98 (37)	104 (40)	110 (43)	111 (44)	108 (42)	105 (41)	98 (37)	91 (33)	80 (27)	111 (44)
Mean maximum °F (°C)	71.8 (22.1)	76.2 (24.6)	83.8 (28.8)	88.5 (31.4)	95.9 (35.5)	103.1 (39.5)	102.9 (39.4)	100.8 (38.2)	96.9 (36.1)	89.9 (32.2)	80.7 (27.1)	72.6 (22.6)	105.1 (40.6)
Mean daily maximum °F (°C)	54.9 (12.7)	59.4 (15.2)	67.5 (19.7)	75.2 (24.0)	83.9 (28.8)	93.4 (34.1)	95.3 (35.2)	93.3 (34.1)	86.8 (30.4)	75.9 (24.4)	64.1 (17.8)	54.5 (12.5)	75.3 (24.1)
Daily mean °F (°C)	40.2 (4.6)	43.9 (6.6)	51.6 (10.9)	59.2 (15.1)	68.3 (20.2)	77.7 (25.4)	81.0 (27.2)	79.2 (26.2)	72.3 (22.4)	60.7 (15.9)	49.1 (9.5)	40.3 (4.6)	60.3 (15.7)
Mean daily minimum °F (°C)	25.5 (−3.6)	28.4 (−2.0)	35.6 (2.0)	43.2 (6.2)	52.6 (11.4)	62.1 (16.7)	66.6 (19.2)	65.2 (18.4)	57.9 (14.4)	45.4 (7.4)	34.2 (1.2)	26.0 (−3.3)	45.2 (7.3)
Mean minimum °F (°C)	8.9 (−12.8)	11.8 (−11.2)	17.6 (−8.0)	26.8 (−2.9)	36.6 (2.6)	50.6 (10.3)	58.4 (14.7)	56.9 (13.8)	43.1 (6.2)	27.9 (−2.3)	16.7 (−8.5)	7.7 (−13.5)	3.9 (−15.6)
Record low °F (°C)	−20 (−29)	−19 (−28)	−9 (−23)	8 (−13)	21 (−6)	35 (2)	48 (9)	45 (7)	30 (−1)	11 (−12)	−5 (−21)	−15 (−26)	−20 (−29)
Average precipitation inches (mm)	0.66 (17)	0.43 (11)	1.09 (28)	1.09 (28)	1.77 (45)	2.14 (54)	2.69 (68)	2.42 (61)	1.40 (36)	1.73 (44)	0.72 (18)	0.82 (21)	16.96 (431)
Average snowfall inches (cm)	4.3 (11)	1.8 (4.6)	2.1 (5.3)	0.9 (2.3)	0.1 (0.25)	0.0 (0.0)	0.0 (0.0)	0.0 (0.0)	0.0 (0.0)	0.5 (1.3)	2.0 (5.1)	5.4 (14)	17.1 (43.85)
Average precipitation days (≥ 0.01 in)	2.7	2.4	3.2	3.2	4.7	6.1	6.7	7.2	4.6	3.8	2.7	3.4	50.7
Average snowy days (≥ 0.1 in)	1.4	1.0	0.6	0.4	0.0	0.0	0.0	0.0	0.0	0.2	0.7	2.1	6.4
Source 1: NOAA
Source 2: National Weather Service

== Demographics ==
Historical population
Census	Pop.	Note	%±
1950	362		—
1960	411		13.5%
1970	308		−25.1%
1980	341		10.7%
1990	277		−18.8%
2000	306		10.5%
2010	216		−29.4%
2020	195		−9.7%
U.S. Decennial Census

As of the census of 2000, there were 306 people, 118 households, and 82 families residing in the village. The population density was 117 inhabitants per square mile (45/km^{2}). There were 133 housing units at an average density of 50.6 per square mile (19.5/km^{2}). The racial makeup of the village was 87.91% White, 1.63% Native American, 6.54% from other races, and 3.92% from two or more races. Hispanic or Latino of any race were 32.03% of the population.

There were 118 households, out of which 37.3% had children under the age of 18 living with them, 56.8% were married couples living together, 12.7% had a female householder with no husband present, and 29.7% were non-families. 28.0% of all households were made up of individuals, and 14.4% had someone living alone who was 65 years of age or older. The average household size was 2.59 and the average family size was 3.24.

In the village, the population was spread out, with 30.7% under the age of 18, 5.9% from 18 to 24, 24.5% from 25 to 44, 21.9% from 45 to 64, and 17.0% who were 65 years of age or older. The median age was 36 years. For every 100 females, there were 74.9 males. For every 100 females age 18 and over, there were 78.2 males.

The median income for a household in the village was $22,917, and the median income for a family was $27,000. Males had a median income of $30,000 versus $16,607 for females. The per capita income for the village was $11,592. About 14.3% of families and 16.8% of the population were below the poverty line, including 26.7% of those under the age of eighteen and 13.6% of those 65 or over.
