= Cuervo, New Mexico =

- Unincorporated town
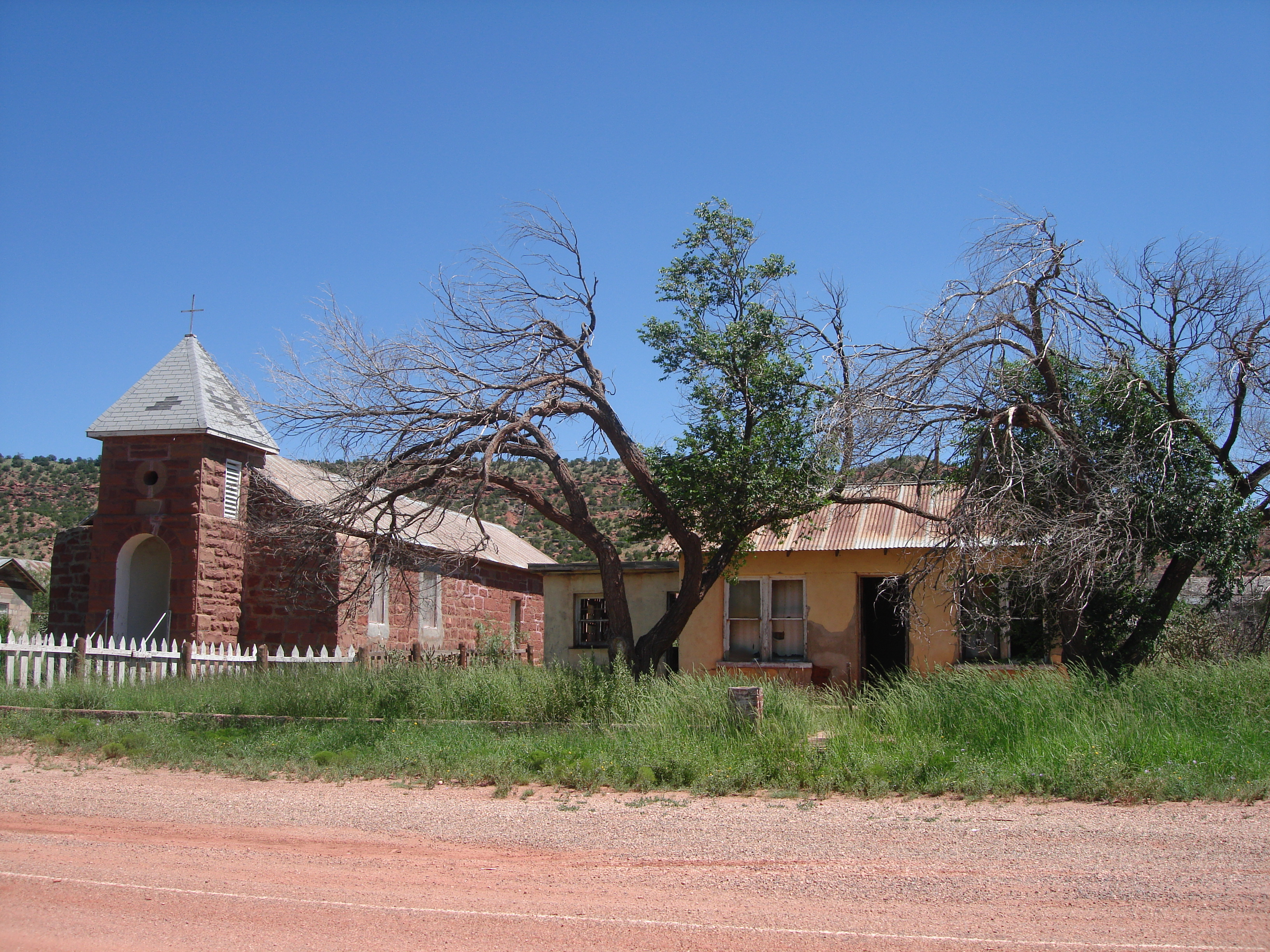
- Cuervo's church with its deteriorated rectory

- Location within New Mexico Location within the United States
- Coordinates: 35°01′52″N 104°24′31″W
- Country: United States
- State: New Mexico
- County: Guadalupe
- Elevation: 4,859 ft (1,481 m)

Population (2000)
  - Total: 58
- Time zone: UTC-7 (Mountain (MST))
  - Summer (DST): UTC-6 (MDT)
- ZIP code: 88417
- Area code: 575
- GNIS feature ID: 915818

Cuervo is an unincorporated town in Guadalupe County, New Mexico, United States. Cuervo is located along Interstate 40 16.8 miles (27.0 km) east-northeast of Santa Rosa. Cuervo had a post office until September 10, 2011; it still has its own ZIP code, 88417. The community is nearly a ghost town now, having been split by the construction of I-40; but there is still a small church and a gas station. As of the 2000 census, the population was estimated at around 58 residents.

Cuervo was founded in 1901 when a railroad was built nearby, and a post office was opened there in 1902, although records indicate that there was a settlement there prior to 1901. It began as a supply center for ranches in the area in 1910 and by 1926, it had become a stop on Route 66 for travellers. The 1940 census recorded a population of 128, although by that time there were "few gas stations, groceries, no café, garage or other tourist accommodations." By 2011 the shell of an old stone schoolhouse and a stone church were still standing.

Cuervo consists of four streets south of I-40 and two streets north of the interstate. Nearly all of the structures in the community are abandoned and very deteriorated, although two of the homes appear updated and inhabited, along with one auto repair shop. The community's long-abandoned school building and church appear to be undergoing restoration.

== Gallery ==
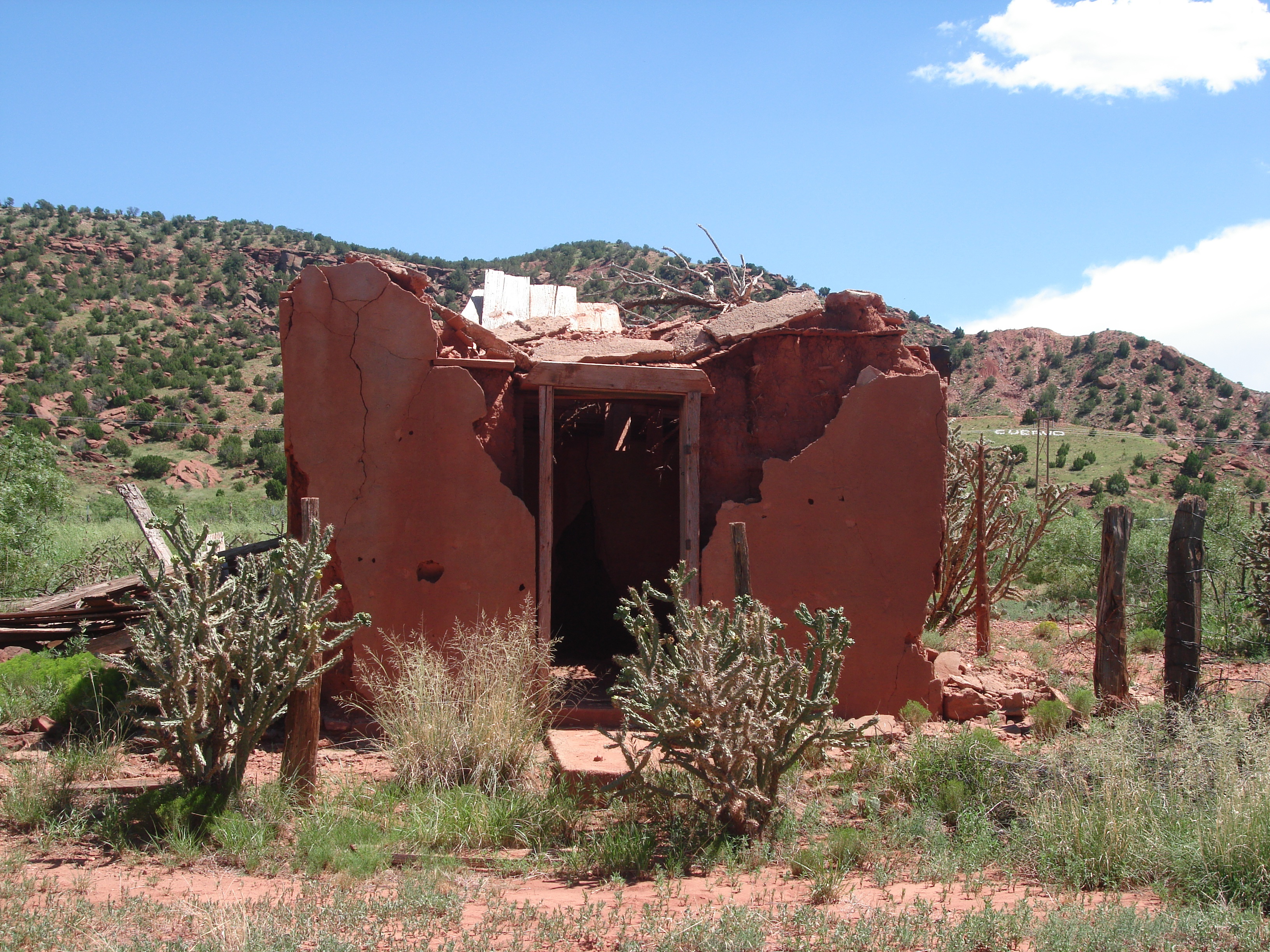
Crumbling adobe building

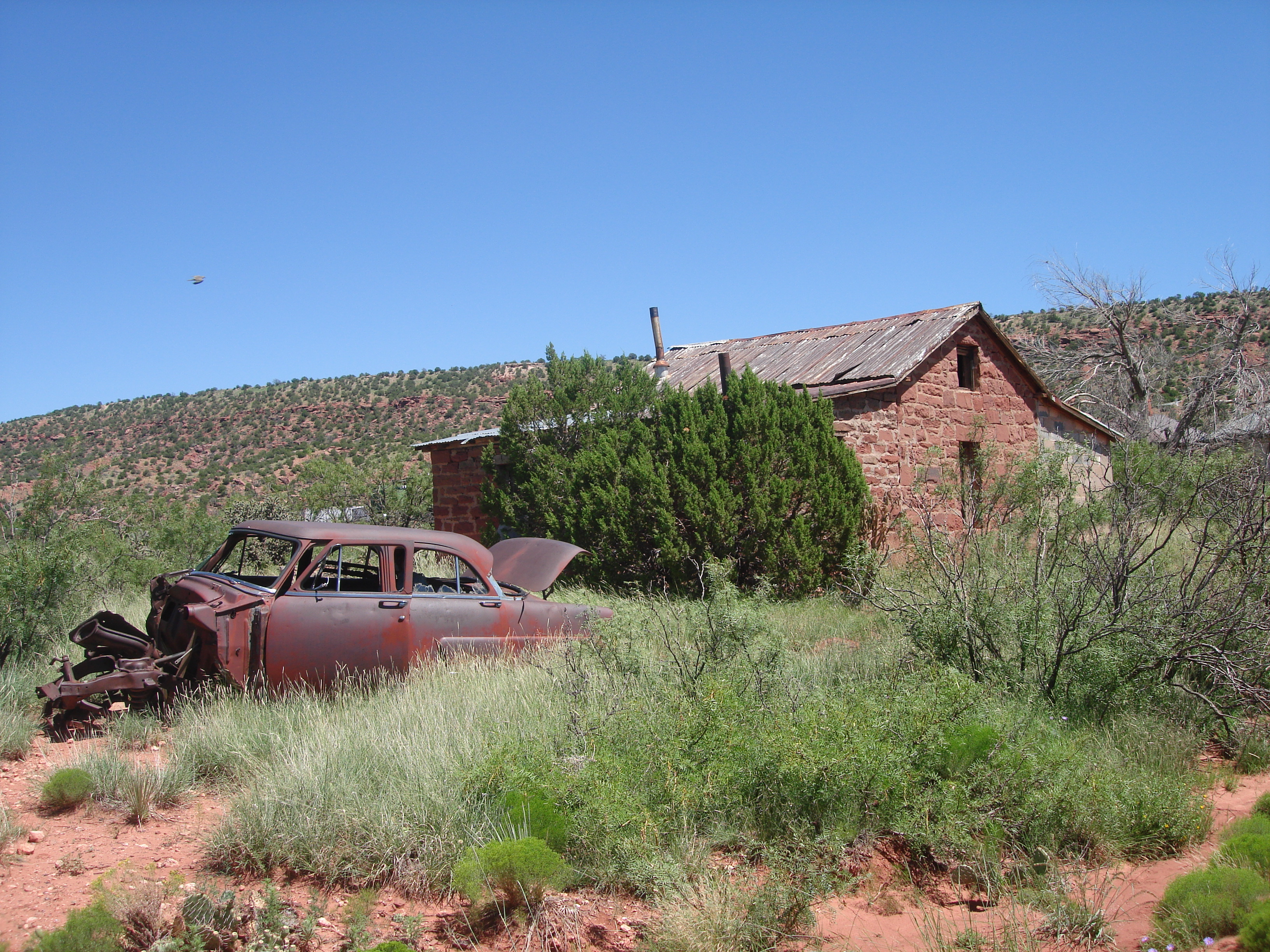
Old stone schoolhouse with abandoned vehicle

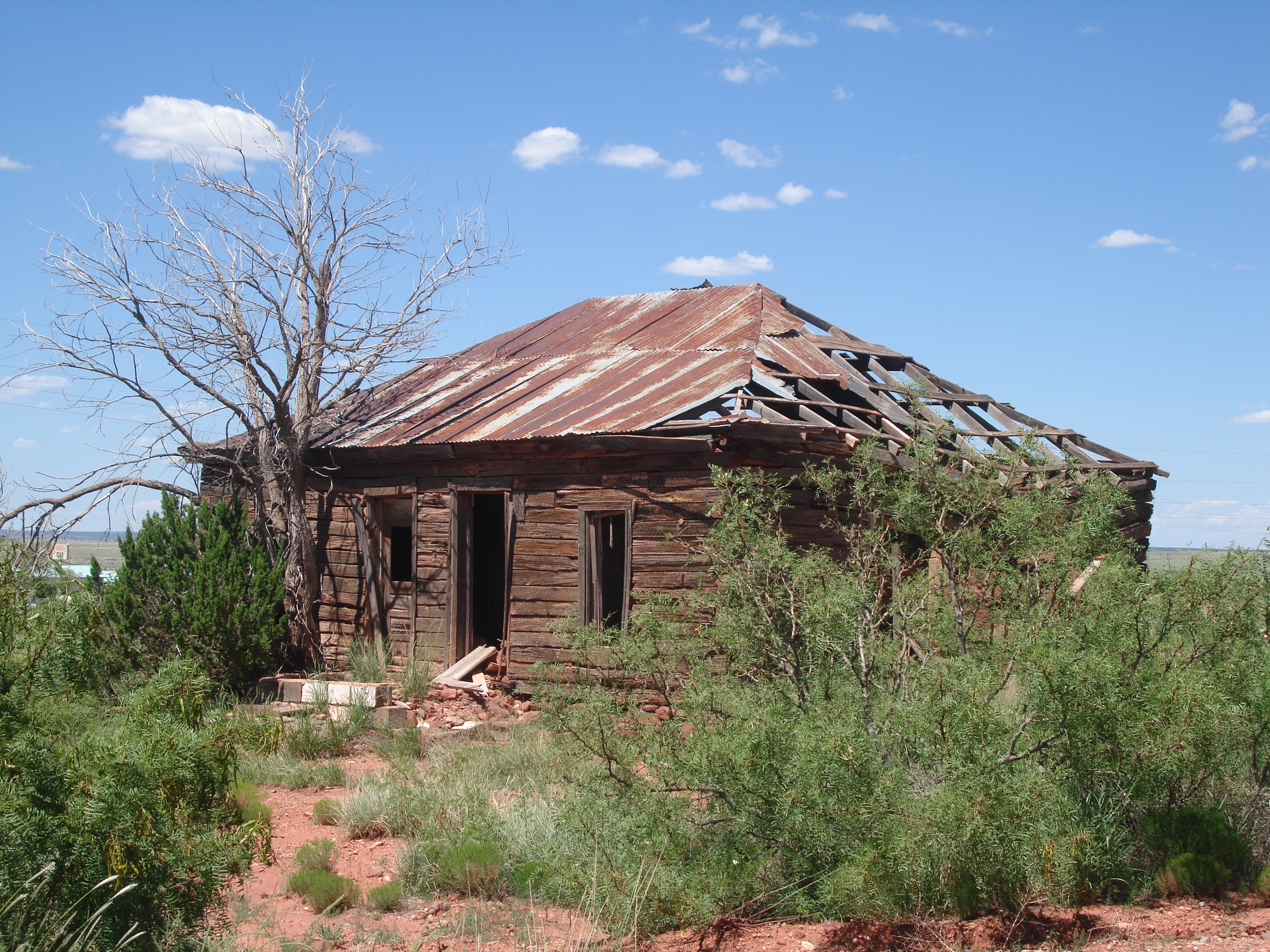
Wood-frame structure

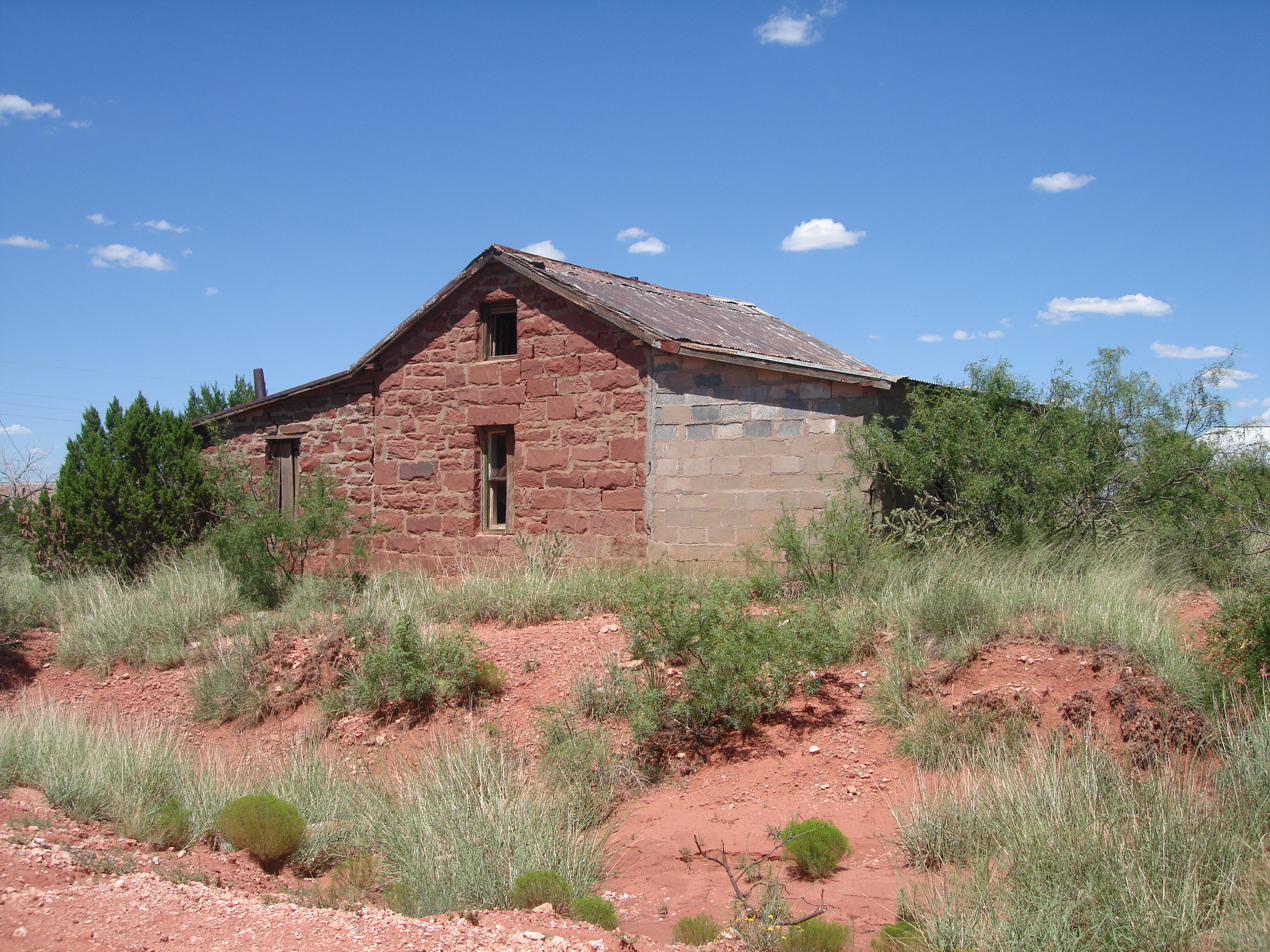
Old stone schoolhouse

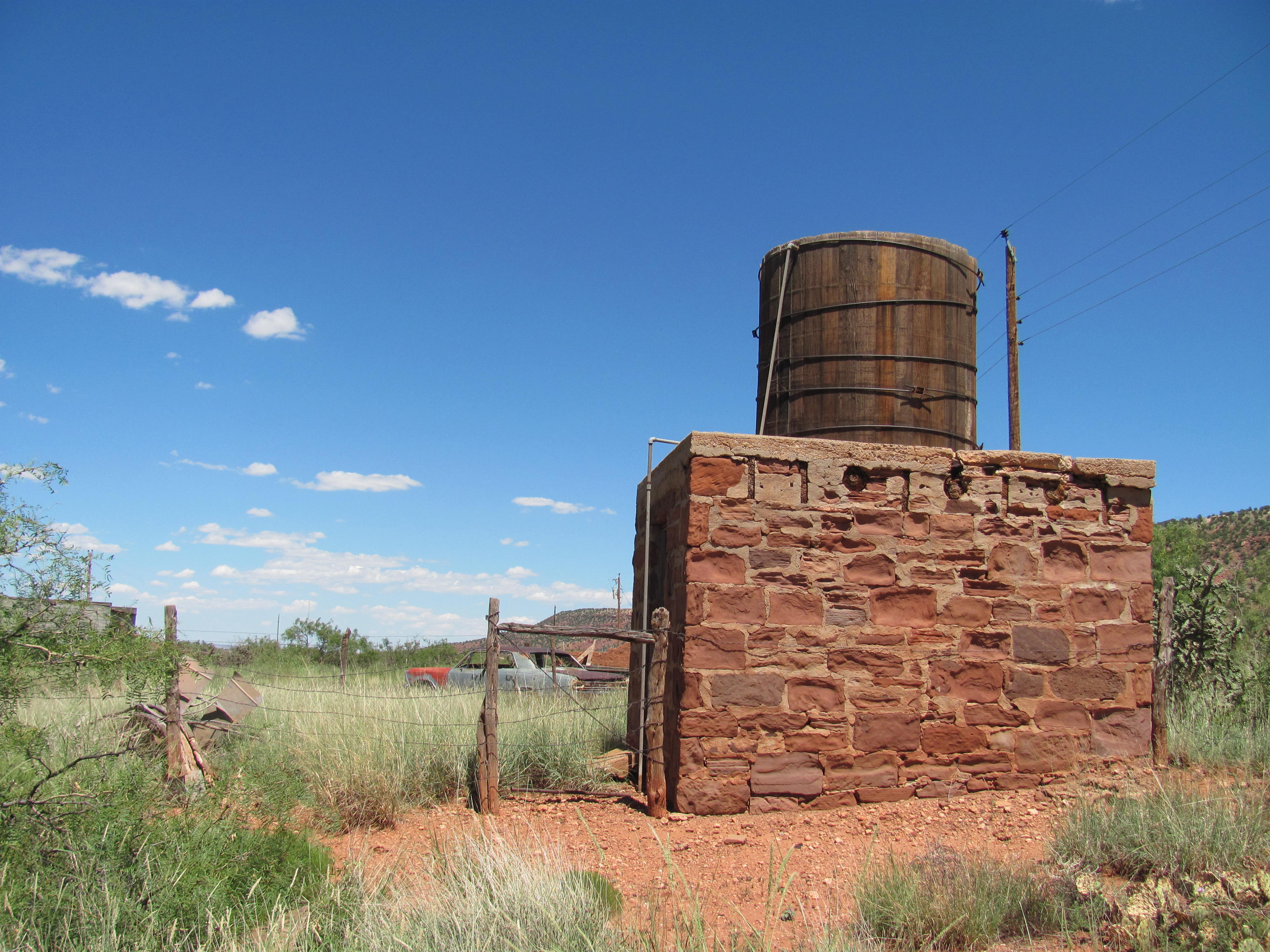
Water tower
