= Estancia, New Mexico =

- Town
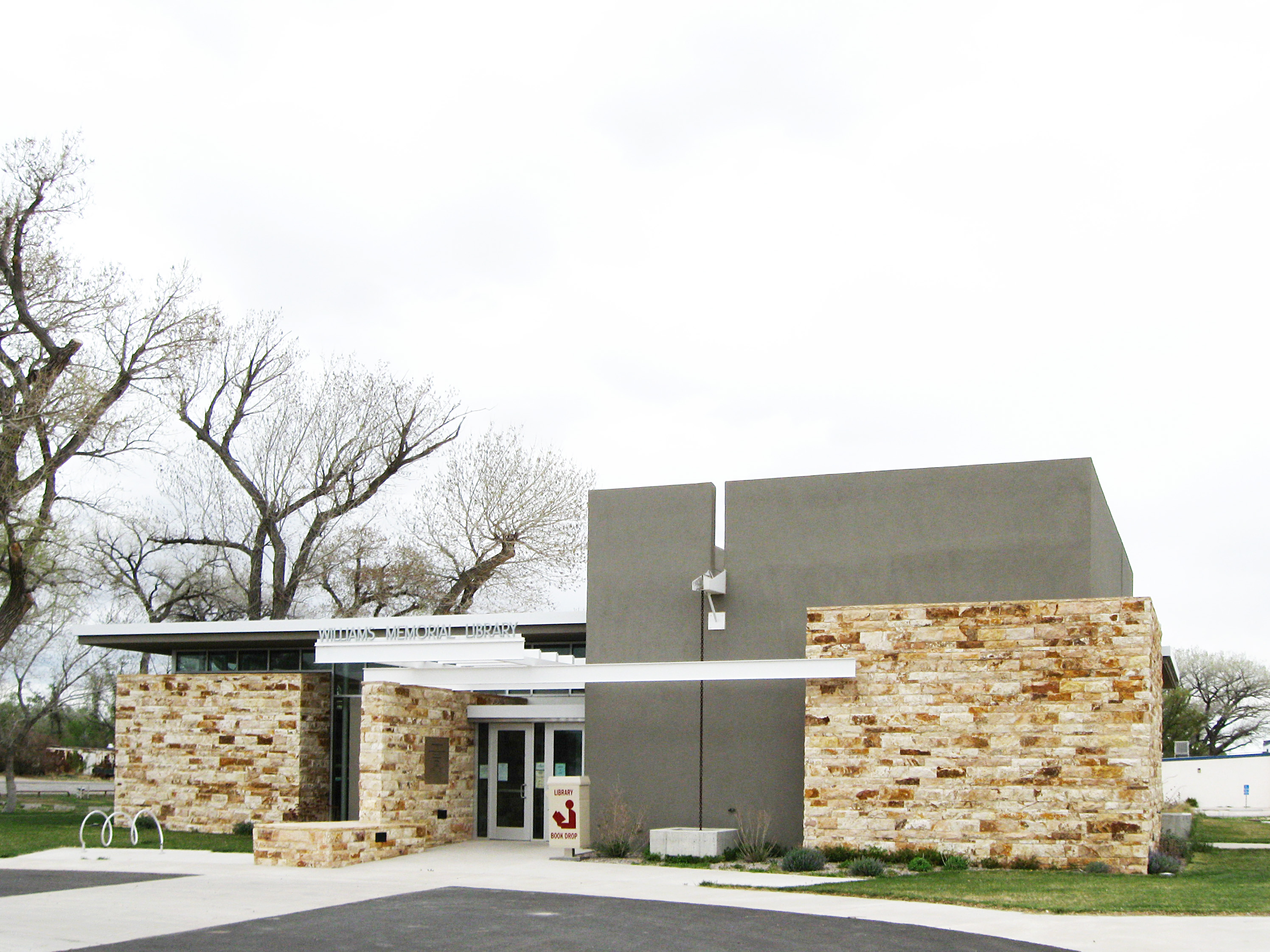
- Williams Memorial Library

- Seal

- Location of Estancia, New Mexico

- Location in the United States
- Coordinates: 34°45′30″N 106°3′20″W
- Country: United States
- State: New Mexico
- County: Torrance

Area
  - Total: 6.22 sq mi (16.10 km^{2})
  - Land: 6.17 sq mi (15.98 km^{2})
  - Water: 0.046 sq mi (0.12 km^{2})
- Elevation: 6,099 ft (1,859 m)

Population (2020)
  - Total: 1,242
  - Density: 201.3/sq mi (77.74/km^{2})
- Time zone: UTC-7 (Mountain (MST))
  - Summer (DST): UTC-6 (MDT)
- ZIP codes: 87009, 87016
- Area code: 505
- FIPS code: 35-25380
- GNIS feature ID: 2412601
- Website: www.townofestancia.com

Estancia is a town in Torrance County, New Mexico, United States. As of the 2020 census, the town population was 1,242. It is the county seat of Torrance County.

Estancia is part of the Albuquerque metropolitan area.

== History ==
Estancia is shown as a town "destroyed by enemies" (nomadic Native Americans) on a map made by Don Bernardo de Miera y Pacheco in 1779.

In 1998, the mayoral election between the appointed incumbent James Farrington and challenger JoAnn Carlson was decided by winning poker hand. Farrington, a sandwich shop owner and former town councilor, had been appointed two and a half years before, was challenged by Carlson, who accused Farrington of not living in the town. Both candidates tied with 68 votes each, and according to New Mexico statutes, a municipal election tie had to be broken via a game of chance. A coin flip allowed Farrington to choose the game of chance, with him choosing a poker hand to decide the mayorship. Farrington won the draw with an ace-high flush, beating Carlson's 10-high flush, electing Farrington to a full four-year term.

In 2026, amidst construction of an ICE detention facility, the town declared a water emergency as the town's wells ran dry and water had to be trucked in. Detainees at the facility also stated the water they were using caused skin irritation and increased hair loss. Mayor Runnel Riley, who had taken a leave of absence in response to personal health issues, was the recipient of a 'no confidence' vote from the town council. That same year, Mayor Pro-Tem Amy May was removed from her position after a warrant was issued for her arrest for the unlawful sale of alcoholic beverages.

== Geography ==
According to the United States Census Bureau, the town has a total area of 5.7 square miles (15 km^{2}), of which 5.7 square miles (15 km^{2}) is land and 0.04 square miles (0.10 km^{2}) (0.35%) is water.

== Demographics ==
Historical population
Census	Pop.	Note	%±
1910	517		—
1920	578		11.8%
1930	634		9.7%
1940	668		5.4%
1950	916		37.1%
1960	797		−13.0%
1970	721		−9.5%
1980	830		15.1%
1990	792		−4.6%
2000	1,584		100.0%
2010	1,655		4.5%
2020	1,242		−25.0%
U.S. Decennial Census

As of the census of 2000, there were 1,584 people, 393 households, and 284 families residing in the town. The population density was 277.7 inhabitants per square mile (107.2/km^{2}). There were 487 housing units at an average density of 85.4 per square mile (33.0/km^{2}). The racial makeup of the town was 70.08% White, 10.16% African American, 2.21% Native American, 0.06% Asian, 14.71% from other races, and 2.78% from two or more races. Hispanic or Latino of any race were 50.57% of the population.

Over half the population in 2010 consisted of inmates in the CoreCivic prison on the east side of town, built in 1990. The corporation has threatened to close the prison before October 2017, saying it will shut down if it cannot be provided with another 300 prisoners to increase its bottom line. It employs 200, and provides a substantial amount of income, $700,000 annually and $300,000 in taxes to the city and county.

There were 393 households, out of which 35.9% had children under the age of 18 living with them, 50.9% were married couples living together, 17.8% had a female householder with no husband present, and 27.7% were non-families. 24.4% of all households were made up of individuals, and 10.2% had someone living alone who was 65 years of age or older. The average household size was 2.70 and the average family size was 3.20.

In the town, the population was spread out, with 20.6% under the age of 18, 10.7% from 18 to 24, 40.2% from 25 to 44, 20.6% from 45 to 64, and 7.9% who were 65 years of age or older. The median age was 34 years. For every 100 females, there were 186.4 males. For every 100 females age 18 and over, there were 217.7 males.

The median income for a household in the town was $24,276, and the median income for a family was $33,750. Males had a median income of $26,932 versus $18,214 for females. The per capita income for the town was $8,479. About 19.9% of families and 25.3% of the population were below the poverty line, including 32.9% of those under age 18 and 13.9% of those age 65 or over.

== Climate ==
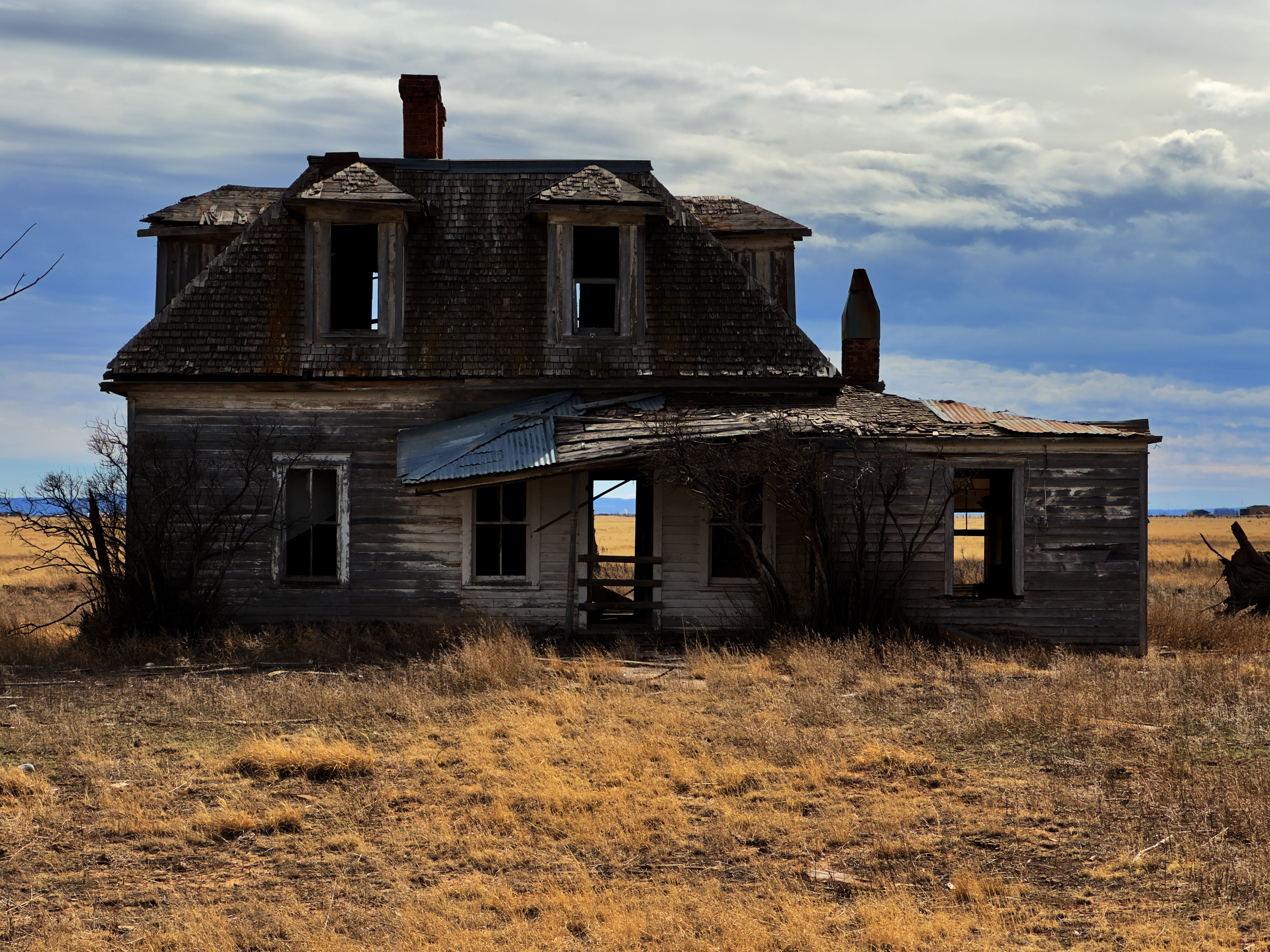
Abandoned house on NM 55 outside Estancia, New Mexico. Used as a shooting location for the TV series The Lost Room.

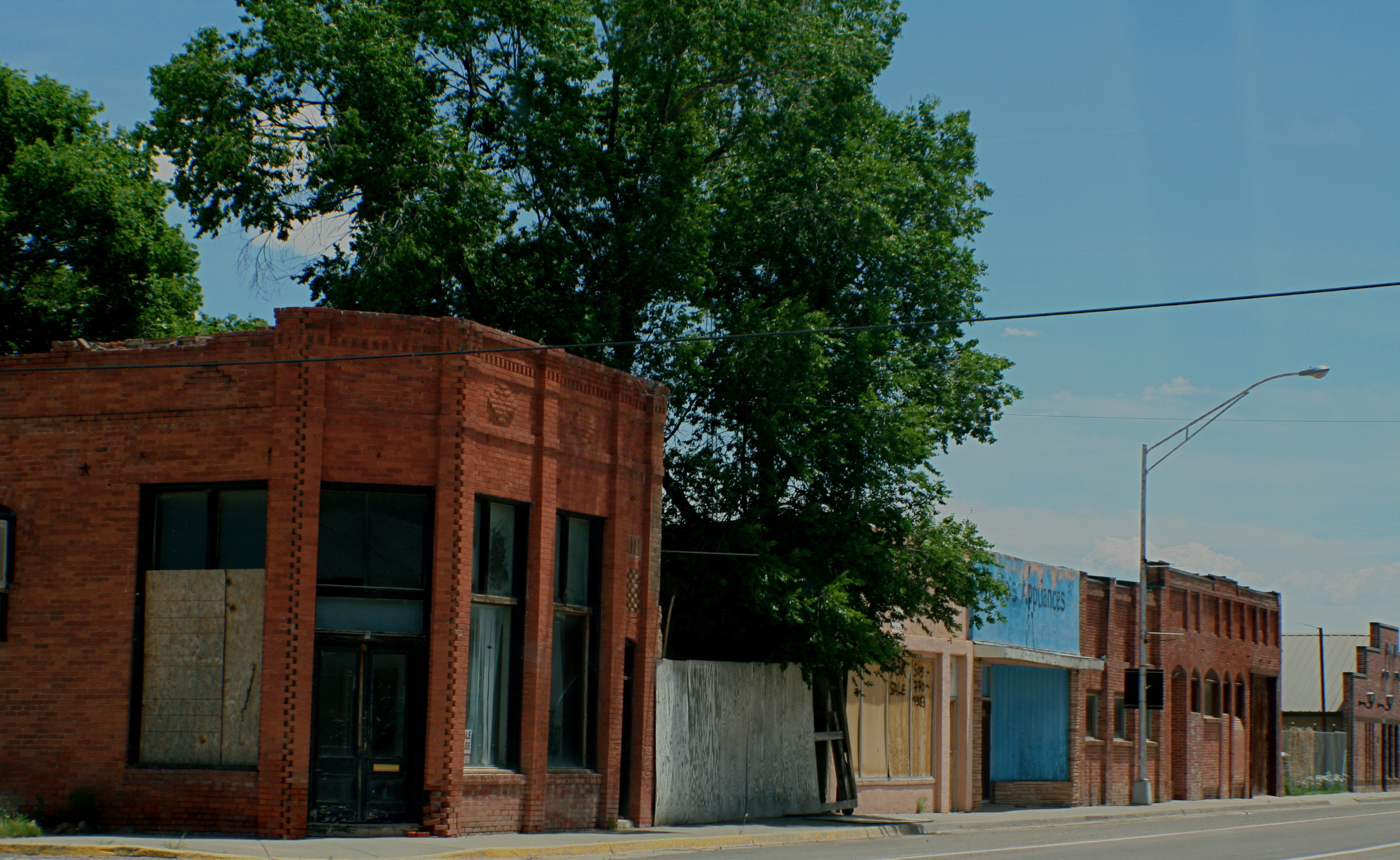
Closed commercial buildings in downtown Estancia, 2008

Estancia has a typical New Mexico cool semi-arid climate (Köppen BSk). During the “summer” season from April to June, afternoons change from warm to hot, mornings move from freezing or near-freezing to cool, and the sky is generally very clear. The monsoon season from July to September provides the heaviest precipitation due to frequent thunderstorms, although diurnal temperature ranges remain above 35 °F or 19.4 °C. The cool winter half of the year from October to March gradually chills with freezing mornings almost every day. Over a whole year 177.1 mornings fall below freezing although most afternoons even in the depth of winter are cool and sunny and maxima during an average winter top freezing on all but 6.1 afternoons. Occasionally, an extratropical storm will penetrate far south enough to provide an easterly flow from the Gulf of Mexico: the average annual snowfall is 19.2 inches or 0.49 metres, although as much as 46.0 inches (1.17 m) fell in January 1987, and over 55.1 inches (1.40 m) between July 1915 and June 1916.

Since records began in 1904 the wettest calendar year has been 1911 with 27.25 in (692.1 mm) and the driest 1955 with only 4.80 in (121.9 mm), followed by 1956 with 4.87 in (123.7 mm). The wettest month has been October 1911 with 9.66 in (245.4 mm), followed by July 1911 with 7.79 in (197.9 mm), and June 1996 with 7.05 in (179.1 mm). The wettest days has been June 27, 1996, with 3.05 in (77.5 mm), the hottest afternoon June 19, 1989, which reached 104 °F (40 °C) and the coldest morning on January 7, 1971, when the mercury fell to −37 °F (−38.3 °C).

Climate data for Estancia, New Mexico, 1991–2020 normals, extremes 1904–2020
Month	Jan	Feb	Mar	Apr	May	Jun	Jul	Aug	Sep	Oct	Nov	Dec	Year
Record high °F (°C)	71 (22)	77 (25)	84 (29)	88 (31)	96 (36)	104 (40)	103 (39)	98 (37)	96 (36)	89 (32)	79 (26)	74 (23)	104 (40)
Mean daily maximum °F (°C)	48.3 (9.1)	53.4 (11.9)	61.9 (16.6)	69.3 (20.7)	78.5 (25.8)	89.0 (31.7)	89.8 (32.1)	87.4 (30.8)	81.8 (27.7)	71.3 (21.8)	58.9 (14.9)	48.5 (9.2)	69.8 (21.0)
Daily mean °F (°C)	31.8 (−0.1)	35.9 (2.2)	43.1 (6.2)	50.0 (10.0)	58.7 (14.8)	68.1 (20.1)	72.1 (22.3)	69.9 (21.1)	63.2 (17.3)	52.1 (11.2)	40.4 (4.7)	31.7 (−0.2)	51.4 (10.8)
Mean daily minimum °F (°C)	15.2 (−9.3)	18.4 (−7.6)	24.2 (−4.3)	30.6 (−0.8)	38.9 (3.8)	47.2 (8.4)	54.3 (12.4)	52.3 (11.3)	44.6 (7.0)	33.0 (0.6)	21.9 (−5.6)	14.9 (−9.5)	33.0 (0.5)
Record low °F (°C)	−37 (−38)	−30 (−34)	−10 (−23)	2 (−17)	12 (−11)	23 (−5)	35 (2)	33 (1)	20 (−7)	4 (−16)	−22 (−30)	−33 (−36)	−37 (−38)
Average precipitation inches (mm)	0.53 (13)	0.36 (9.1)	0.59 (15)	0.49 (12)	1.16 (29)	1.19 (30)	2.36 (60)	2.36 (60)	1.77 (45)	1.37 (35)	0.69 (18)	0.69 (18)	13.56 (344.1)
Average snowfall inches (cm)	4.1 (10)	2.6 (6.6)	2.1 (5.3)	0.6 (1.5)	0.0 (0.0)	0.0 (0.0)	0.0 (0.0)	0.0 (0.0)	0.0 (0.0)	0.8 (2.0)	2.5 (6.4)	5.2 (13)	17.9 (44.8)
Average precipitation days (≥ 0.01 in)	3.4	2.7	3.2	2.6	4.0	4.4	9.4	9.2	6.1	4.8	3.3	3.4	56.5
Average snowy days (≥ 0.1 in)	1.9	1.5	0.9	0.4	0.0	0.0	0.0	0.0	0.0	0.3	0.9	2.4	8.3
Source 1: NOAA
Source 2: xmACIS2
