= New Mexico State Road 337 =

State highway in New Mexico, United States

State Road 337

Route information
- Maintained by NMDOT
- Length: 29.685 mi (47.773 km)

Major junctions
- South end: NM 55 near Tajique
- NM 333 / Historic US 66 in Tijeras
- North end: I-40 in Tijeras

Location
- Country: United States
- State: New Mexico
- Counties: Torrance, Bernalillo

Highway system
- New Mexico State Highway System; Interstate; US; State; Scenic
← NM 336	→ NM 338

State Road 337 (NM 337) is a state highway in the US state of New Mexico. Its total length is approximately 29.7 miles (47.8 km). NM 337's southern terminus is at NM 55 east of Tajique, and NM 337's northern terminus is north of the village of Tijeras, at Interstate 40 (I-40).

== Major intersections ==
County	Location	mi	km	Destinations	Notes
Torrance		0.000	0.000	NM 55	Southern terminus
Bernalillo	Yrisarri	17.390	27.986	NM 217 north	Southern terminus of NM 217
Bernalillo	Tijeras	29.200	46.993	NM 333 / Historic US 66 to I-40 east	Access to I-40 exit 175 eastbound via NM 333 east
Bernalillo	Tijeras	29.685	47.773	I-40 west	Northern terminus; I-40 exit 175, westbound only
1.000 mi = 1.609 km; 1.000 km = 0.621 mi: Incomplete access
