= Edgewood, New Mexico =

- Town
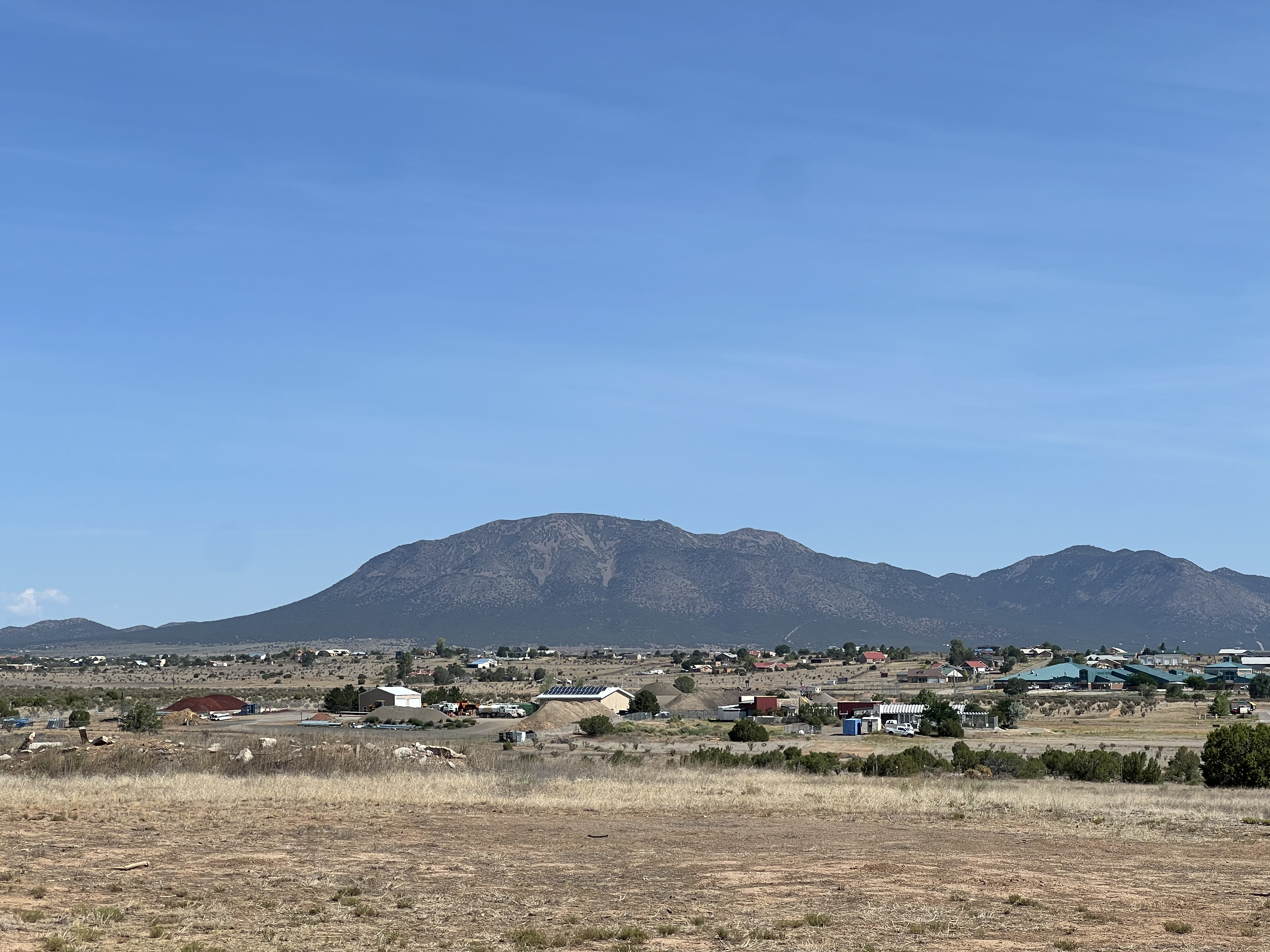
- The northern part of Edgewood, as seen from the Edgewood Town Hall looking north toward South Mountain, a prominent local landmark.
- Motto: "Where the Mountains Meet the Plains"
- Location of Edgewood, New Mexico

- Location in the United States
- Coordinates: 35°07′55″N 106°12′55″W
- Country: United States
- State: New Mexico
- County: Santa Fe
- Established: January 1, 2022

Government
  - Type: Commission-Manager system

Area
  - Total: 56.81 sq mi (147.15 km^{2})
  - Land: 56.80 sq mi (147.10 km^{2})
  - Water: 0.019 sq mi (0.05 km^{2})
- Elevation: 6,687 ft (2,038 m)

Population (2020)
  - Total: 6,174
  - Density: 108.7/sq mi (41.97/km^{2})
- Time zone: UTC-7 (Mountain (MST))
  - Summer (DST): UTC-6 (MDT)
- ZIP code: 87015
- Area code: 505
- FIPS code: 35-22380
- GNIS feature ID: 2412467
- Website: www.edgewood-nm.gov

Edgewood is a town in Santa Fe County, New Mexico, United States. Through annexations, its town boundaries now extend into Bernalillo and Torrance Counties. Although in Santa Fe County, Edgewood is geographically closer to Albuquerque than to the city of Santa Fe. As of the 2020 census, Edgewood had a population of 6,174.

== History ==
Homesteaders moving into the American West created the initial settlements that grew into what is now the town of Edgewood. Taking advantage of the federal Homestead Acts, pioneer families obtained land claims and began farming and ranching in the Edgewood area during the late 19th and early 20th centuries.

Edgewood was founded by a group of southern Santa Fe County residents and landowners. After the incorporation of the town in 1999, large areas of land were annexed. Efforts by the town government to avoid annexing properties whose owners did not wish to be brought within the town boundaries resulted in a checkerboard pattern of incorporated and unincorporated properties, one of the issues to be resolved in the town's Comprehensive Plan. One controversial annexation greatly enlarged the municipal boundaries and was the source of vigorous public debate. Despite two appeals and one lawsuit, the annexation was upheld.

== Geography ==
Edgewood is located 33 miles (53 km) east of Albuquerque along Interstate 40.

According to the United States Census Bureau, the town has a total area of 48.7 square miles (126.2 km^{2}), all land except for 0.015 square miles (0.04 km^{2}) of water, covering 0.03% of the town. It is located within the Estancia Valley, east of the Sandia Mountains and Manzano Mountains of central New Mexico. Most of the land cover in the area is woodland or grassland. The town's commercial district lies along New Mexico Highway 66 (part of the post-1937 U.S. Route 66) and Highway 344. The town is 15 miles (24 km) east of the community of Sandia Park and the east base of the Sandia Mountains.

== Demographics ==
Historical population
Census	Pop.	Note	%±
2000	1,893		—
2010	3,735		97.3%
2020	6,174		65.3%
U.S. Decennial Census

Edgewood is part of the Albuquerque–Santa Fe–Las Vegas combined statistical area.

=== 2020 census ===
As of the 2020 census, Edgewood had a population of 6,174. The median age was 43.4 years. 21.9% of residents were under the age of 18 and 18.7% of residents were 65 years of age or older. For every 100 females there were 98.3 males, and for every 100 females age 18 and over there were 97.9 males age 18 and over.

0.0% of residents lived in urban areas, while 100.0% lived in rural areas.

There were 2,319 households in Edgewood, of which 31.8% had children under the age of 18 living in them. Of all households, 57.2% were married-couple households, 16.1% were households with a male householder and no spouse or partner present, and 20.0% were households with a female householder and no spouse or partner present. About 18.8% of all households were made up of individuals and 8.4% had someone living alone who was 65 years of age or older.

There were 2,540 housing units, of which 8.7% were vacant. The homeowner vacancy rate was 2.5% and the rental vacancy rate was 9.8%.

Racial composition as of the 2020 census
Race	Number	Percent
White	4,681	75.8%
Black or African American	43	0.7%
American Indian and Alaska Native	99	1.6%
Asian	29	0.5%
Native Hawaiian and Other Pacific Islander	13	0.2%
Some other race	396	6.4%
Two or more races	913	14.8%
Hispanic or Latino (of any race)	1,680	27.2%

=== 2000 census ===
As of the census of 2000, 1,893 people, 676 households, and 529 families resided in the town. The population density was 217.2 inhabitants per square mile (83.9/km^{2}). The 755 housing units had an average density of 86.6 per square mile (33.4/km^{2}). The racial makeup of the town was 86.53% White, 0.32% African American, 2.17% Native American, 0.21% Asian, 0.16% Pacific Islander, 8.24% from other races, and 2.38% from two or more races. Hispanics or Latinos of any race were 20.34% of the population.

Of the 676 households, 44.1% had children under 18 living with them, 63.9% were married couples living together, 10.1% had a female householder with no husband present, and 21.6% were not families. About 18.0% of all households were made up of individuals, and 4.4% had someone living alone who was 65 or older. The average household size was 2.80 and the average family size was 3.18.

In the town, the age distribution was 32.9% under 18, 5.3% from 18 to 24, 31.0% from 25 to 44, 24.4% from 45 to 64, and 6.4% who were 65 or older. The median age was 36 years. For every 100 females, there were 98.4 males. For every 100 females 18 and over, there were 94.3 males.

The median income for a household in the town was $42,500, and for a family was $45,952. Males had a median income of $33,365 versus $24,135 for females. The per capita income for the town was $18,146. About 8.4% of families and 10.9% of the population were below the poverty line, including 13.1% of those under 18 and 11.8% of those 65 or over.

== Government ==
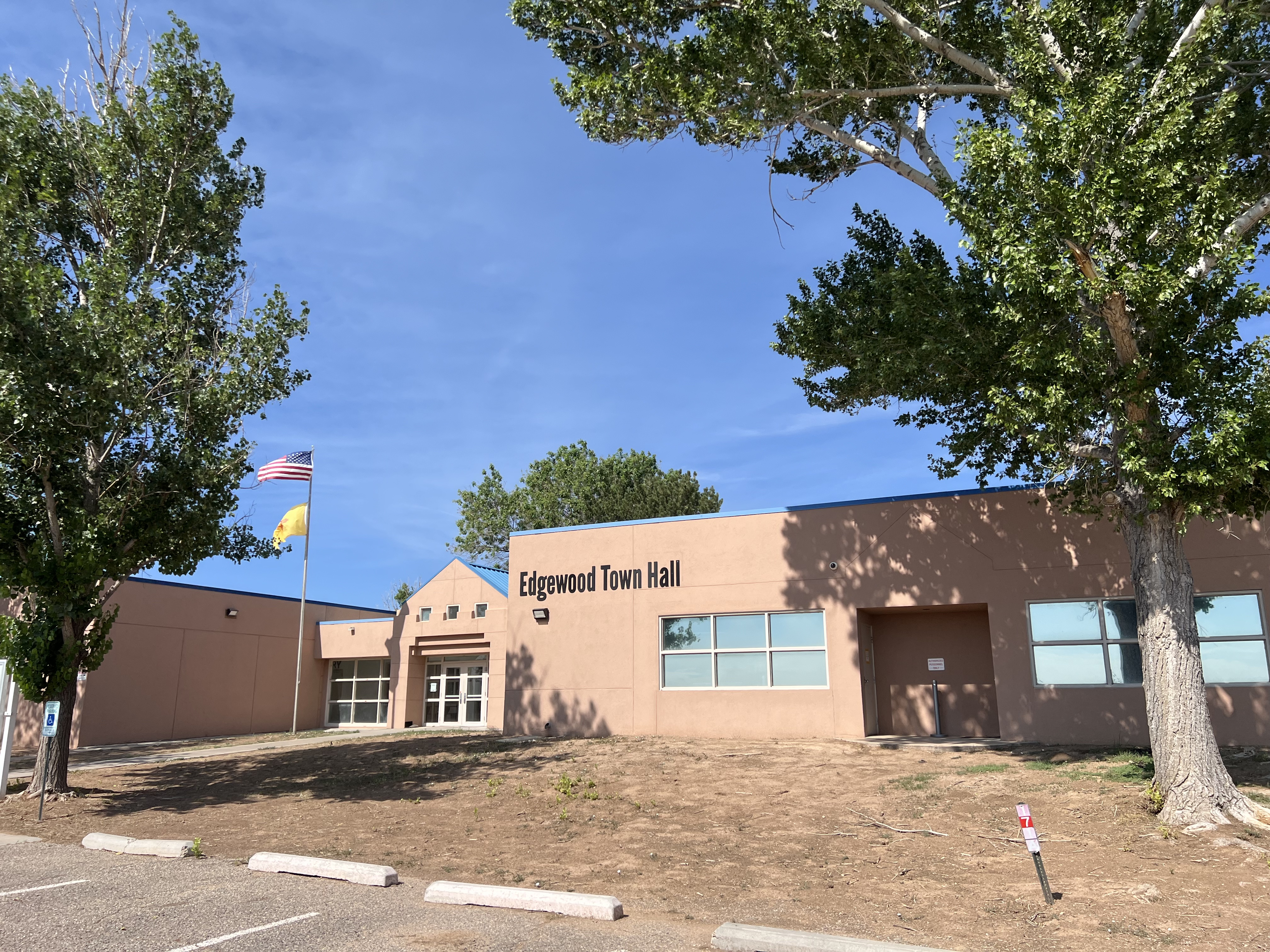
Edgewood Town Hall as of August 2026

Edgewood is governed by a commission-manager form of government. Prior to January 1, 2022, Edgewood used a mayor-council system of government, but in August 2020, the town's residents voted to change their form of local government. Currently, the town commission is made up of Kenneth Brennan (Dist. 1), Devon Taylor (Dist. 2), Patrick Milligan (Dist. 3), Stephen Murillo (Dist. 4), and Mike Rariden (Dist. 5), with the mayor's role filled by Mike Rariden and Mayor pro tem filled by Commissioner Murillo.

== Education ==
Moriarty-Edgewood School District serves all portions of Edgewood in Santa Fe County. The portion in Bernalillo County is zoned to Albuquerque Public Schools. The portion in Sandoval County is in Bernalillo Public Schools. Additionally, Estancia Valley Classical Academy charter school serves grades K–12.

== Notable people ==
- Jason Anderson, 2018 AMA Monster Energy supercross champion
- Donald "Cowboy" Cerrone, American professional mixed martial artist (MMA) fighter
- John Dodson, MMA fighter (raised in Albuquerque and then Edgewood)
- Matt Moore, Major League Baseball pitcher
