= U.S. Route 66 in New Mexico =

Historic highway in the United States

U.S. Highway 66
- Will Rogers Highway

Route information
- Maintained by the New Mexico State Highway Department
- Length: 374 mi (602 km)
- Existed: November 11, 1926–June 26, 1985

Major junctions
- West end: US 66 / US 666 at the Arizona state line at Lupton
- US 666 in Gallup; NM 6 at Correo; US 85 in Albuquerque; US 285 at Clines Corners; US 84 / NM 219 north of Pastura; US 54 / US 84 in Santa Rosa; US 54 in Tucumcari
- East end: US 66 at the Texas state line in Glenrio

Location
- Country: United States
- State: New Mexico
- Counties: McKinley, Cibola, Bernalillo, Santa Fe, Torrance, Guadalupe, Quay

Highway system
- United States Numbered Highway System; List; Special; Divided; New Mexico State Highway System; Interstate; US; State; Scenic
← NM 65	US 66	→ NM 68
← NM 117	NM 118	→ NM 119
← NM 121	NM 122	→ NM 123
← NM 123	NM 124	→ NM 125
← NM 330	NM 333	→ NM 337

U.S. Route 66 (US 66, Route 66) in New Mexico ran east–west across the central part of the state, along the path now taken by Interstate 40 (I-40). However, until 1937, it took a longer route via Santa Fe, now roughly I-25 and US 84. Large portions of the old road parallel to I-40 have been designated State Road 117 (NM 117), NM 118, NM 122, NM 124, NM 333, three separate loops of I-40 Business, and state-maintained frontage roads.

It is one of the roads on the Trails of the Ancients Byway, one of the designated New Mexico Scenic Byways.

== History ==
Route 66 in New Mexico was marked over portions of two auto trails — the National Old Trails Road from Arizona via Albuquerque and Santa Fe to just shy of Las Vegas, and one of the main routes of the Ozark Trails network from that point into Texas. The state had taken over maintenance of these roads under several numbers: NM 6 from Arizona to Los Lunas, part of NM 1 through Albuquerque and Santa Fe to near Las Vegas, NM 56 to Santa Rosa, the short NM 104 to Cuervo, and part of NM 3 to Texas. While NM 56 and NM 104 were completely absorbed by US 66, NM 6 was reassigned to a route splitting from US 66 (old NM 6) at Laguna and heading straight east through Albuquerque, Moriarty, and Palma to US 66 at Santa Rosa. Except between Albuquerque and Moriarty, where it formed part of US 470, this was an unimproved road.

New Mexico had long been controlled politically by the Santa Fe Ring, a group of businesspeople and officials with close ties to the Republican Party. In 1924, Democrat Arthur Thomas Hannett was unexpectedly elected for a single term (1925–1927) as governor. Blaming the Republican establishment in Santa Fe for his defeat, Hannett used the lame duck remainder of his term to force through a sixty-nine mile cutoff from Santa Rosa directly to Albuquerque, bypassing Santa Fe entirely. The hastily constructed new road opened January 3, 1927, while incoming governor Richard Dillon was still trying to get construction stopped. Dillon was replaced by Arthur Seligman, a Democrat, in 1931.

This new NM 6 was approved as a future realignment of Route 66 by 1932, and in 1933, a new bridge over the Rio Puerco opened. Once paving was completed in 1937, with AASHO approval given on September 26, 1937, Route 66 was moved to this shorter route, known as the Laguna Cut-off west of Albuquerque and the Santa Rosa Cut-off east of Albuquerque. The bypassed roads became NM 6 once again to the west and part of US 84 to the east.

== Route description ==
From the Arizona state line to the Grants area the landscape is mountainous, and US 66 meanders around I-40. It also passes through some Indian reservations. At Laguna, New Mexico is the Laguna Indian Pueblo.

At Mesita, the highway originally followed what is now NM 6 to east of I-25 at Los Lunas. It passed through Albuquerque from south to north along Fourth Street, part of the historic El Camino Real de Tierra Adentro (El Camino Real). The highway is now replaced with I-25 through Santa Fe to, almost, Las Vegas (Historic 66 turns south before reaching Las Vegas), though several old sections exist which are barely (if at all) driveable. From south of Las Vegas back to I-40, the road has been replaced with US 84. When I-40 was established, it bypassed the main parts of towns.

The later, and more popular, alignment, continued straight west to Albuquerque, becoming Central Avenue through the city. While the former US 66 through Albuquerque is now owned and maintained by the city of Albuquerque, a few US 66/BUSINESS I-40 signs remain along Central Avenue in the downtown area. East of Albuquerque, US 66 is now NM 333 all the way to Moriarty. A stretch of NM 333 in Tijeras is a musical road, with rumble strips that play "America the Beautiful". I-40 east of Moriarty to Santa Rosa was built by adding a second set of lanes to US 66. East of Santa Rosa, US 66 is now largely frontage roads for I-40 or business loops for Santa Rosa and Tucumcari. At San Jon, the original alignment (now gravel) continues through Bard and Endee to the Texas state line at the historic ghost town of Glenrio. A later alignment is the north frontage road for I-40.

== Major intersections ==
This table represents US 66's junctions in 1950.

County	Location	mi	km	Destinations	Notes
McKinley		0.0	0.0	US 66 west / US 666 west – Flagstaff	Continuation into Arizona
McKinley	Gallup	21	34	US 666 north (Third Street) – Shiprock	Eastern end of US 666 overlap; now southbound NM 610 (locally) and US 491 (long-distance)
McKinley	Gallup	21	34	NM 32 south (Second Street) – Zuni	Now northbound NM 610 (locally) and NM 602 (long-distance)
McKinley	Thoreau	52	84	NM 56 – Crownpoint, Chaco Canyon	Western end of NM 56 overlap; now NM 371
Cibola	Bluewater Village	69	111	NM 56 north – Bluewater Village	Now NM 606
Cibola	Milan	77	124	NM 53 east – San Mateo, Ambrosia Lake	Western end of NM 53 overlap; now NM 605
Cibola	Grants	79	127	NM 53 west – San Rafael	Eastern end of NM 53 overlap
Cibola	Paraje	104	167	NM 23 south – Acoma	Now Casa Blanca Road
Cibola	Correo	123	198	NM 6 east – Los Lunas	US 66 prior to 1937
Bernalillo	Albuquerque	152	245	NM 45 south (Coors Boulevard)	
Bernalillo	Albuquerque	155	249	US 85 (4th Street)	Pre-1937 US 66; later NM 313
Bernalillo	Albuquerque	155	249	NM 47	
Bernalillo	Tijeras	171	275	NM 10	Now NM 337
Santa Fe	No major junctions				
Torrance	Moriarty	194	312	NM 41 – Stanley, Galisteo, Santa Fe, Estancia	Former US 366 east
Torrance	Clines Corners	216	348	US 285 – Santa Fe, Vaughn	
Torrance		229	369	NM 3 – Villanueva, Encino	
Guadalupe		255	410	US 84 west / NM 219 south – Las Vegas	Pre-1937 US 66; western end of US 84 overlap
Guadalupe	Santa Rosa	273	439	US 54 west – Vaughn	US 66 prior to 1937; western end of US 54 overlap
Guadalupe	Santa Rosa	275	443	US 84 east – Clovis, Fort Sumner	Eastern end of US 84 overlap
Guadalupe		284	457	NM 156 east	
Guadalupe	Newkirk	300	480	NM 129 – Conchas Dam	
Quay	Tucumcari	333	536	US 54 east – Logan	Eastern end of US 54 overlap
Quay	Tucumcari	333	536	NM 18 (1st Street)	Now NM 104/NM 209
Quay		339	546	NM 88	Now NM 278
Quay	San Jon	356	573	NM 39 – Logan, Grady	Now NM 469
Quay	Endee	369	594	NM 93 south	
Quay	Glenrio	374	602	US 66 east – Amarillo	Continuation into Texas
1.000 mi = 1.609 km; 1.000 km = 0.621 mi

== Structures ==
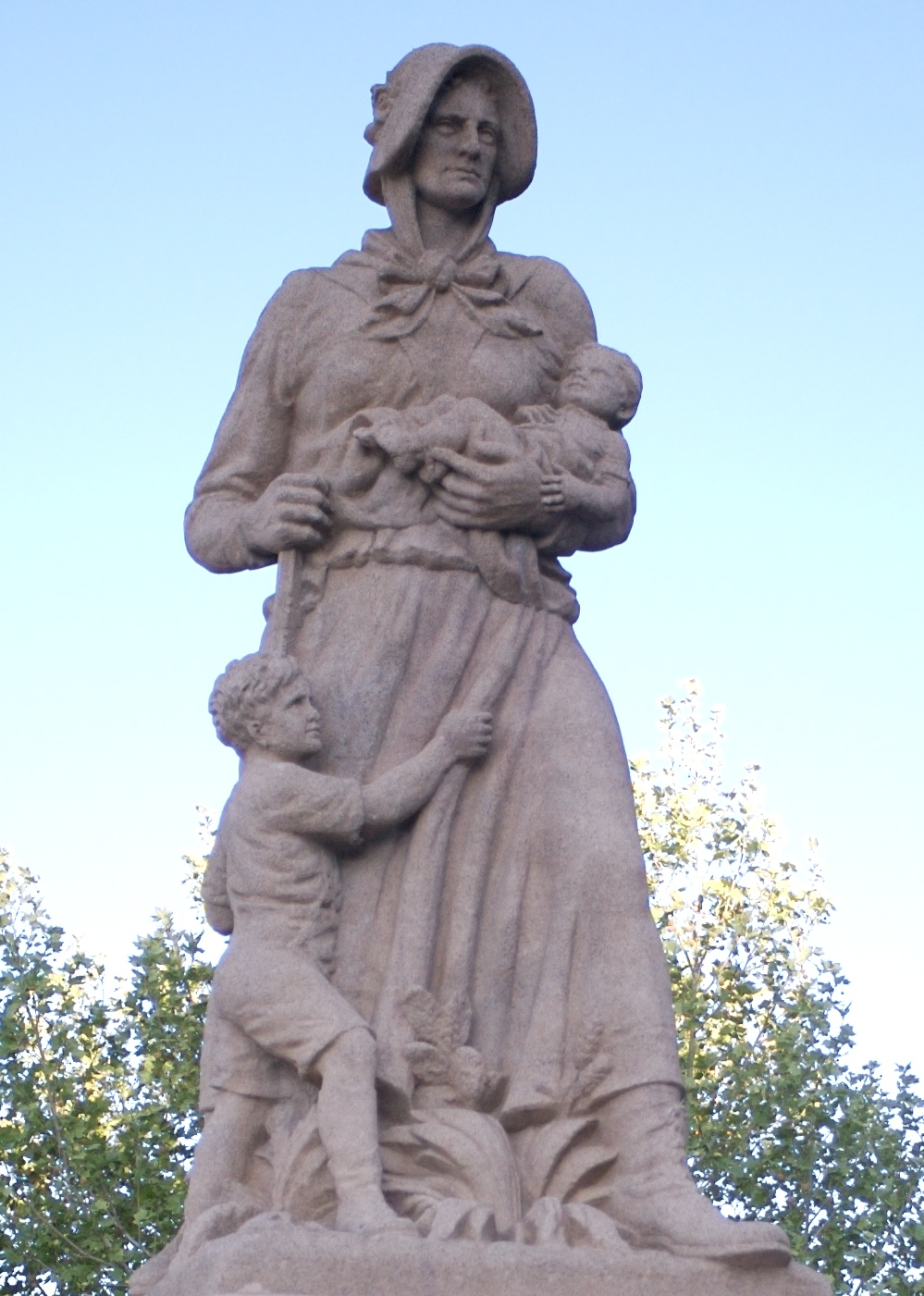
Madonna of the Trail, Albuquerque

The New Mexico Madonna of the Trail is one of a dozen monuments (one in each state on the National Old Trails Road) commemorating the hardships of early pioneer travellers. She stands on US 66 in Albuquerque. Albuquerque is also home to the 1927 Art Deco themed KiMo Theater and the first modern suburban shopping mall in New Mexico, Nob Hill.

=== Historic districts ===
Fort Wingate, an abandoned military installation east of Gallup, traces its history to attempts in the 19th century to forcibly displace Navajo to native reservations. It later served as a line of defense against the Apache. Closed in 1912, it reopened briefly to house prisoners during both world wars.

The Barelas-South Fourth Street Historic District is a collection of commercial buildings from various eras in a formerly Hispanic residential neighborhood in Albuquerque. Eras represented include the arrival of the Atchison, Topeka and Santa Fe Railway and the later construction of US 66.

The Park Lake Historic District is a 25-acre municipal park on a lake in Santa Rosa in addition to the natural Blue hole lake coming from the vast underground water system. Constructed under the Works Progress Administration between 1934 and 1940, the park was a make-work project during the Great Depression.

=== Restaurants ===
The historic Jones Motor Company building in Albuquerque, originally a motorcar dealership, was re-purposed to (formerly) house the local Kelly's Brew Pub, now home to the local Italian restaurant M'Tucci's Bar Roma.

=== Service and filling stations ===
Richardson's Store in Montoya, a 1901 railroad town, initially provided provisions for Rock Island Railroad workers and ranchers. When Route 66 came to town, the store carried groceries and auto supplies. It closed after I-40 bypassed the community.

Roy T. Herman's Garage and Service Station in Thoreau was moved in 1937 from Grants, where it had originally been established in 1935. The routing of Route 66 had moved, so the station moved with it to keep its Route 66 clientele.

=== Trading posts ===
New Mexico is home to the Native American Pueblo of Santo Domingo (Kewa Pueblo) in Santo Domingo and the Pueblo of Laguna in Laguna. Roadside merchants on Route 66 often based their stores on the design of the early trading posts which originally served the native community. The De Anza Motor Lodge and the surrounding Nob Hill neighborhood served as a trading post for the Zuni Pueblo in Albuquerque.

Bowlin's Old Crater Trading Post, Bluewater has long been closed and vacant. Originally a native trading post, its proprietors established a modern chain of highway service centers. Albuquerque's 1939 Maisel's Indian Trading Post, which once employed hundreds of native craftspeople, was reopened in the 1980s and remains in operation today.

=== Camps, motor courts, and motels ===
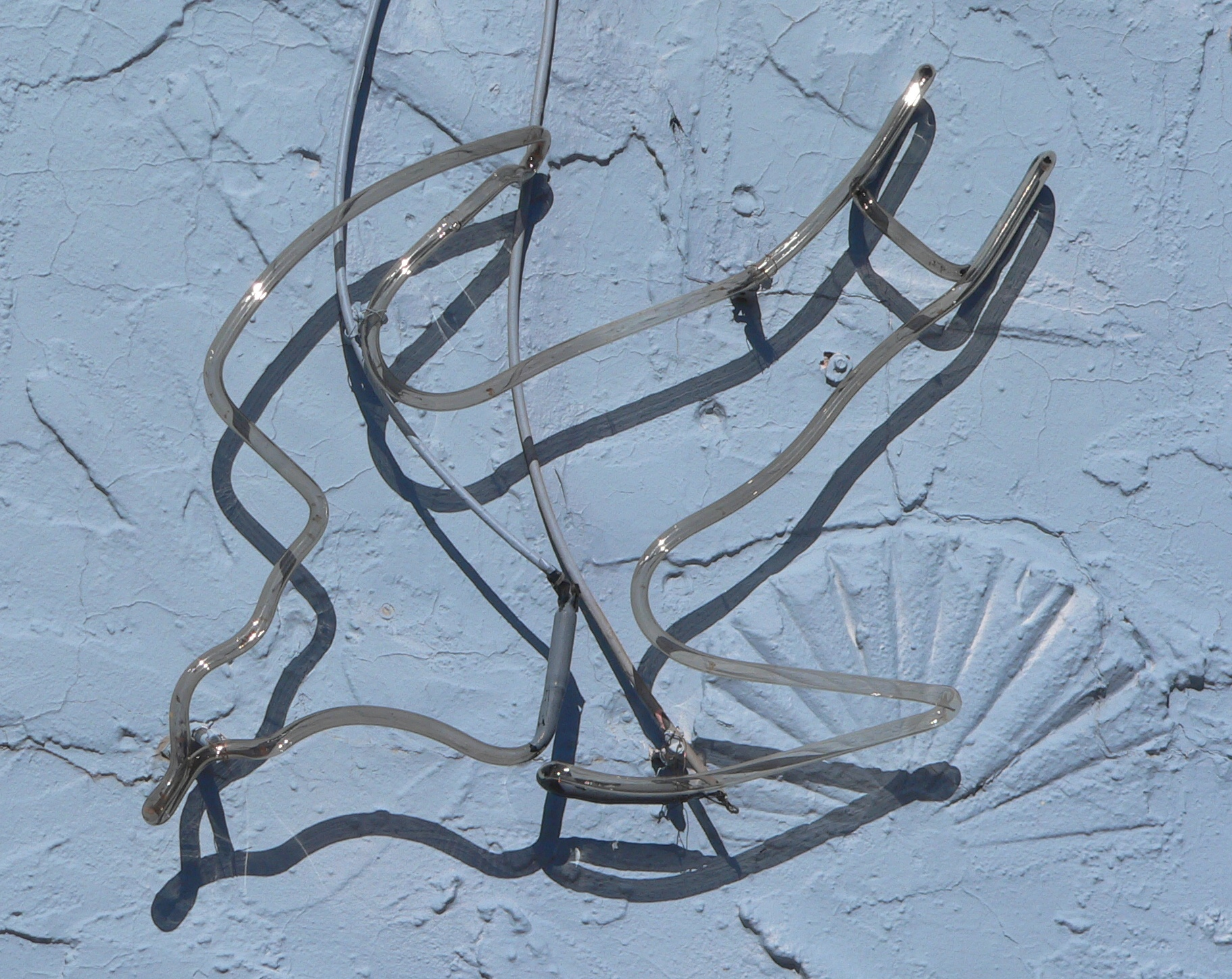
Neon signage illuminating the Blue Swallow Motel in Tucumcari

Various towns and cities quickly established roadside motel strips to accommodate a burgeoning traffic from Route 66 travelers.

Tucumcari had long advertised "2000 motel rooms" (later "1200 motel rooms" due to the construction of I-40, diminishing visitor population) on roadside signage for hundreds of miles along US 66 using the slogan "Tucumcari tonite!" At least one historically restored Tucumcari Boulevard motel, the 12-room, neon-lit, 1939 Blue Swallow Motel, is listed on the National Register of Historic Places. Another motel recently restored nearby is the Motel Safari. The Motel Safari was built in 1959 by Chester Dohrer and features a mid-century modern retro design with "Doo Wop" or "Googie" styled architecture. Boomerangs, holes in cinder blocks, counter stacked bricks protruding from the façade and whimsical metal cylinders that light up at night, along with its famous camel atop the neon sign, paying tribute to the U.S. Camel Corps that once came through the area in the 1800s on a surveying expedition for a future national road system.

Central Avenue in Albuquerque has many motels from this era, although some (such as the Aztec Motel) have been demolished along with other building to accommodate for modern needs. Historic Albuquerque lodgings from Route 66's heyday include the Luna Lodge, Tewa Motor Lodge, De Anza Motor Lodge and El Vado Auto Court. Some of these motels are currently closed but are the target of local efforts to ensure their historic preservation. In hopes to keep this era alive, some hotels including De Anza Motor Lodge and El Vado Motel have been rejuvenated along the historic route 66 in Albuquerque.

The El Rancho Hotel in Gallup has been the temporary home of many movie stars.

=== Bridges and road segments ===
The Rio Puerco Bridge, a Parker Through truss bridge crossing the Rio Puerco, was built in 1933. Eleven New Mexico road segments on US 66 are listed on the National Register of Historic Places; some originally incorporated wooden bridges to carry the road through flood plains. Listed road segments include: Glenrio to San Jon; San Jon to Tucumcari; Palomas to Montoya; Montoya to Cuervo; Cuervo to NM 156; Albuquerque to Rio Puerco; Laguna to McCartys; McCartys to Grants; Milan to Continental Divide; Iyanbito to Rehobeth; and Manuelito to the Arizona border.

== Related routes ==
=== State Road 118 ===
State Road 118
- Location: Lupton, AZ–near Fort Wingate
- Length: 36.852 mi (59.308 km)

State Road 118 (NM 118) is a 36.852-mile-long (59.308 km) state highway in the US state of New Mexico. NM 118's western terminus is at the Arizona–New Mexico border where it continues westward as Grant Road, and the eastern terminus is at Interstate 40 (I-40) northeast of Fort Wingate. NM 118 follows the routing of the former Historic U.S. Route 66.

Major intersections
The entire route is in McKinley County.

Location	mi	km	Destinations	Notes
Lupton	0.000	0.000	Grant Road	Continues west at Arizona border as Grant Road
	8.100– 8.500	13.036– 13.679	I-40	I-40 exit 8
Gallup	16.579	26.681	I-40	I-40 exit 16
Gallup	20.809	33.489	Arnold Street to NM 602	Access to NM 602 via Arnold Street and Aztec Avenue east
Gallup	21.792	35.071	NM 610	
Gallup	22.710	36.548	NM 609 west	Eastern terminus of NM 609
Gallup	23.740	38.206	NM 564 west	Eastern terminus of NM 564
Rehoboth	25.841	41.587	I-40	I-40 exit 26
Church Rock	29.517	47.503	NM 566 north	Southern terminus of NM 566
Wingate	33.446	53.826	NM 400 south to I-40 east	Northern terminus of NM 400, to eastbound I-40 exit 33
	36.649– 36.852	58.981– 59.308	I-40	Eastern terminus, I-40 exit 36
1.000 mi = 1.609 km; 1.000 km = 0.621 mi

=== State Road 122 ===
State Road 122
- Location: Continental Divide–Grants
- Length: 38.740 mi (62.346 km)

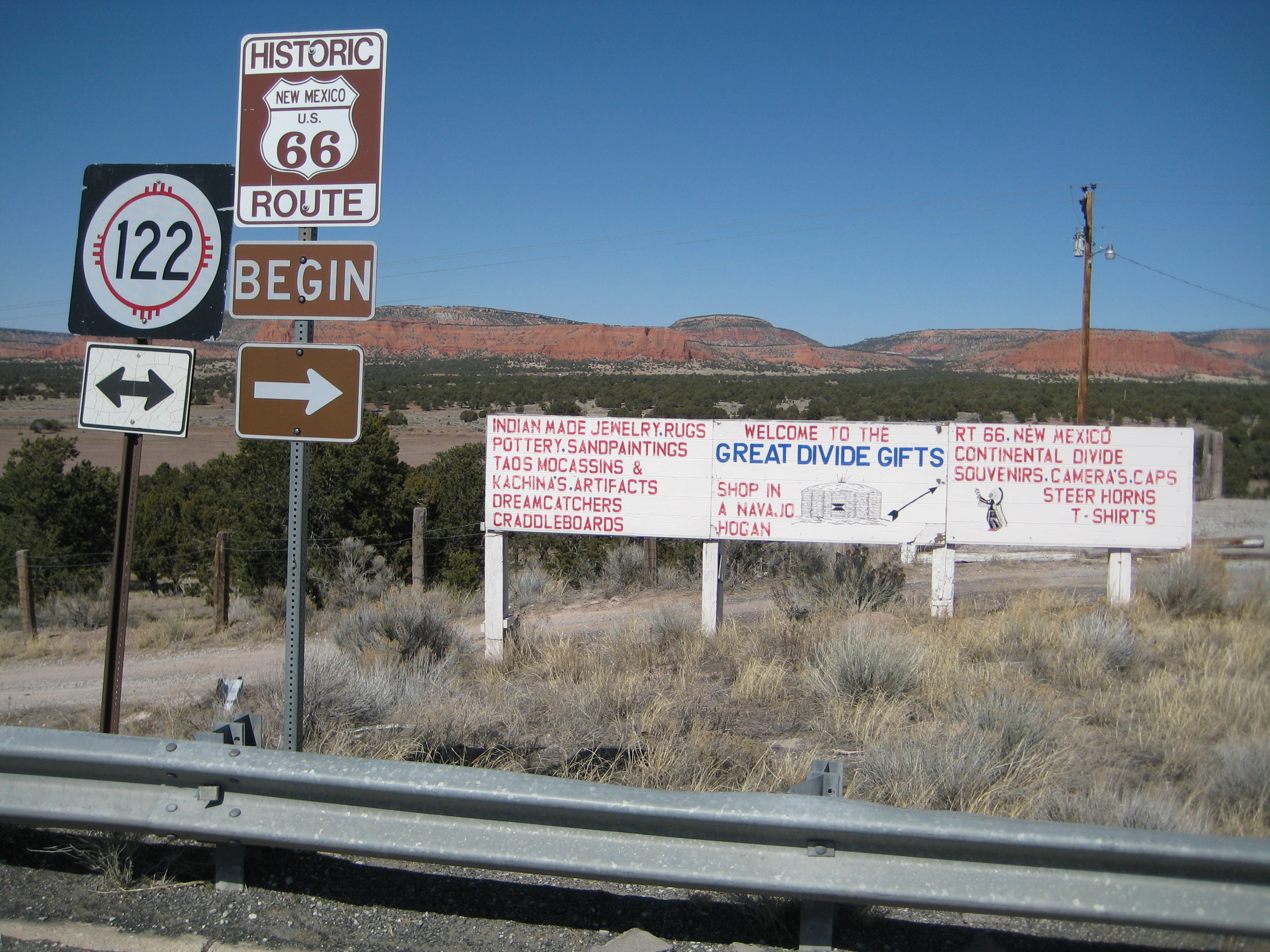
NM 122 westbound near Continental Divide

State Road 122 (NM 122) is a 38.740-mile-long (62.346 km) state highway in the US state of New Mexico. NM 122's western terminus is at Interstate 40 (I-40) west of Thoreau, and the eastern terminus is at I-40 in Grants. NM 122 follows the routing of the former Historic U.S. Route 66. At the September 20, 2018 Transportation Commission meeting the bridge carrying NM 122 over I-40 was dedicated as "Sgt. Jackson Gibson Memorial Bridge" to honor Jackson Gibson for his service as a veteran, community leader and state transportation commissioner.

Major intersections

County	Location	mi	km	Destinations	Notes
McKinley	Continental Divide	0.000	0.000	I-40 – Gallup, Albuquerque	Western terminus; I-40 exit 47
McKinley	Thoreau	6.134	9.872	NM 371	
McKinley	Prewitt	16.090	25.894	NM 412 south to I-40	Northern terminus of NM 412; to I-40 exit 63
Cibola		24.989	40.216	NM 606 south to I-40	Northern terminus of NM 606; to I-40 exit 72
Cibola		26.959	43.386	CR 63	Former NM 334
Cibola		29.799	47.957	NM 568 south	Northern terminus of NM 568
Cibola	Milan	32.022	51.534	NM 605 north	Southern terminus of NM 605
Cibola	Milan	32.211	51.839	NM 615 west (Horizon Boulevard) to I-40	Eastern terminus of NM 615; to I-40 exit 79
Cibola	Grants	34.652	55.767	NM 53 west to I-40	Eastern terminus of NM 53; to I-40 exit 81
Cibola	Grants	36.003	57.941	NM 547 north	Southern terminus of NM 547
Cibola	Grants	37.380	60.157	NM 117 south	Northern terminus of NM 117
Cibola	Grants	38.455– 38.740	61.887– 62.346	I-40	Eastern terminus; I-40 exit 85
1.000 mi = 1.609 km; 1.000 km = 0.621 mi

=== State Road 124 ===
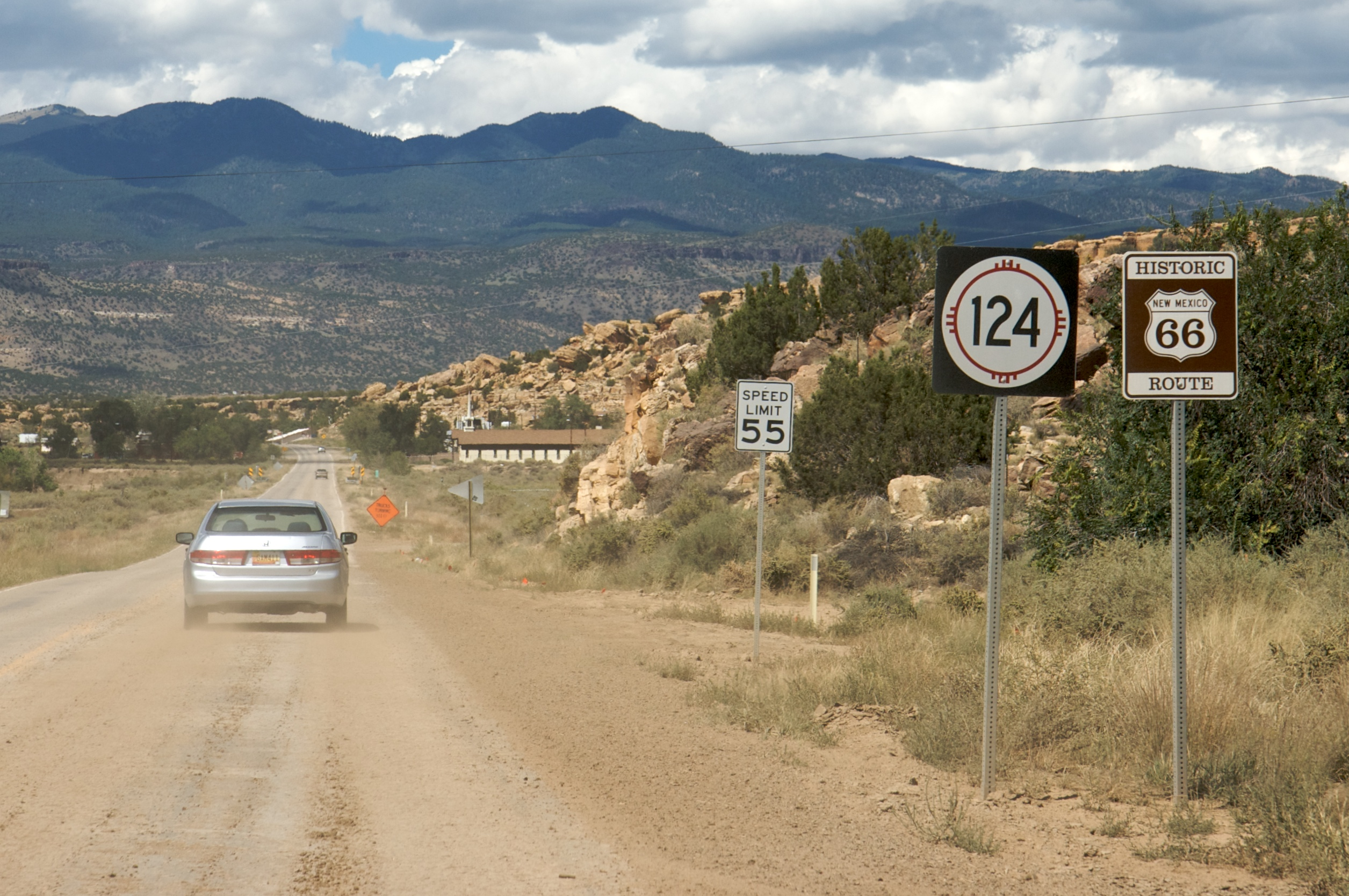
NM 124 westbound near I-40 exit 104

State Road 124
- Location: Cibola County
- Length: 25.253 mi (40.641 km)

State Road 124 (NM 124) is a 25.523-mile-long (41.075 km) state highway in the US state of New Mexico. NM 124's western terminus is at NM 117 southeast of Grants, and the eastern terminus is at Interstate 40 (I-40) east of Laguna. NM 124 follows the routing of the former Historic U.S. Route 66.

Major intersections
The entire route is in Cibola County.

Location	mi	km	Destinations	Notes
	0.000	0.000	NM 117	Western terminus
	7.394	11.899	I-40	I-40 exit 96
Laguna	23.750	38.222	NM 279 north	Southern terminus of NM 279
	25.543	41.107	I-40	Eastern terminus, I-40 exit 114
1.000 mi = 1.609 km; 1.000 km = 0.621 mi

=== State Road 333 ===
State Road 333
- Location: Albuquerque–Moriarty
- Length: 27.715 mi (44.603 km)

NM 333 begins in eastern Albuquerque at an intersection of Tramway Boulevard (NM 556) and Central Avenue, proceeding east on Central, the route of the former U.S. Route 66 (US 66). After a partial interchange with Interstate 40 (I-40), the highway enters the Sandia Mountains through Tijeras Canyon, where it crosses to the north side of I-40 in a diamond interchange. After traveling through Carnuel, it crosses back to the south side of I-40, though this crossing has no interchange.

Before entering the town of Tijeras, there is a former location of a "musical road" feature where rumble strips were arranged to play America the Beautiful for eastbound travelers. Once in Tijeras itself, the highway intersects NM 337, which travels to the southeast, and NM 14, which heads northeast to Santa Fe. Continuing east, NM 333 travels through Sedillo, where it intersects the former NM 306 and NM 217. The highway then leaves Bernalillo County, and enters Santa Fe County and the town of Edgewood, where it intersects NM 344. Shortly thereafter, the highway enters Torrance County and the city of Moriarty, where it ends at an intersection with I-40 Business (I-40 Bus.).

Major intersections
NM 333 follows the routing of the former Historic U.S. Route 66.

County	Location	mi	km	Destinations	Notes
Bernalillo	Albuquerque	0.000	0.000	I-40 / NM 556	Western terminus; I-40 exit 167
Bernalillo	Carnuel	2.060	3.315	I-40	I-40 exit 170
Bernalillo	Tijeras	6.810	10.960	NM 337 to I-40 west	To I-40 exit 175 westbound on/ off ramps via NM 337 north
Bernalillo		7.404	11.916	NM 14 north to I-40 west	Southern terminus of NM 14; to I-40 exit 175 westbound on/ off ramps only
Bernalillo		7.564	12.173	I-40 east	I-40 exit 175 eastbound on ramp only
Bernalillo		10.164	16.357	Access Road (FR 4058); To I-40	To I-40 exit 178
Bernalillo		13.764	22.151	I-40 east	I-40 exit 181 eastbound on/ off ramps only
Bernalillo		13.950	22.450	Sedillo Road To I-40 west	Southern terminus of former NM 306; to I-40 exit 181 westbound on/ off ramps only
Bernalillo		15.342	24.691	NM 217 south	Northern terminus of NM 217
Santa Fe	Edgewood	19.737	31.764	NM 344 north to I-40	Southern terminus of NM 344; to I-40 exit 187
Torrance	Moriarty	27.715	44.603	I-40 BL	Eastern terminus
1.000 mi = 1.609 km; 1.000 km = 0.621 mi: Incomplete access

== See also ==
- Scenic byways in the United States
- U.S. Route 80 in New Mexico

U.S. Route 66
Previous state: Arizona	New Mexico	Next state: Texas
