= Bluewater, New Mexico =

Bluewater, New Mexico may refer to:

- Bluewater, Lincoln County, New Mexico, unincorporated community
- Bluewater, McKinley County, New Mexico, census-designated place
- Bluewater Village, New Mexico, census-designated place in Cibola County with the Bluewater post office

== See also ==
- Bluewater Lake State Park in Cibola County
- Las Tusas, New Mexico, census-designated place in Cibola County, formerly known as Bluewater Acres
