= New Mexico State Road 412 =

State highway in New Mexico, United States

State Road 412

Route information
- Maintained by NMDOT
- Length: 6.168 mi (9.926 km)

Major junctions
- North end: NM 122 in Prewitt
- I-40 in Prewitt
- South end: Bluewater Lake State Park

Location
- Country: United States
- State: New Mexico
- Counties: Cibola, McKinley

Highway system
- New Mexico State Highway System; Interstate; US; State; Scenic
← US 412	→ NM 413

State Road 412 (NM 412) is a 6.168-mile-long (9.926 km) state highway in the US state of New Mexico. NM 412's southern terminus is at the entrance to Bluewater Lake State Park, and the northern terminus is at NM 122 in Prewitt.

== Major intersections ==
Milemakers goes through an inverse pattern.

County	Location	mi	km	Destinations	Notes
McKinley	Prewitt	0.000	0.000	NM 122	Northern terminus
McKinley	Prewitt	0.255	0.410	I-40	I-40 exit 63
Cibola	Bluewater Lake State Park	6.168	9.926	Southern terminus	
1.000 mi = 1.609 km; 1.000 km = 0.621 mi
