= Bluewater, McKinley County, New Mexico =

Bluewater, New Mexico
- Census-designated place
- Location within New Mexico Location within the United States
- Coordinates: 35°19′28″N 108°12′22″W
- Country: United States
- State: New Mexico
- County: McKinley

Area
  - Total: 12.33 sq mi (31.9 km^{2})
  - Land: 12.33 sq mi (31.9 km^{2})
  - Water: 0.00 sq mi (0 km^{2})
- Elevation: 7,461 ft (2,274 m)

Population (2020)
  - Total: 174
  - Density: 14.8/sq mi (5.71/km^{2})
- Time zone: UTC-7 (Mountain (MST))
  - Summer (DST): UTC-6 (MDT)
- ZIP Code: 87323 (Thoreau)
- Area code: 505
- FIPS code: 35-08180
- GNIS feature ID: 2806710

Bluewater is a census-designated place (CDP) in McKinley County, New Mexico, United States. As of the 2020 census it had a population of 174.

== Geography ==
The community is on the southern edge of McKinley County and is bordered to the south by Cibola County. It is in the Las Tusas Valley and is bordered to the north by Cottonwood Creek, which flows east into Bluewater Lake, a reservoir on Bluewater Creek, which continues east to the Rio San Jose at Bluewater Village in Cibola County.

New Mexico State Road 612 (Bluewater Road) passes through the Bluewater CDP, leading northwest 8 miles (13 km) to Thoreau and Interstate 40.

According to the U.S. Census Bureau, the CDP has an area of 12.3 square miles (32 km^{2}), all land.

== Demographics ==
Historical population
| Census | Pop. | Note | %± |
|---|---|---|---|
| 2020 | 174 | | — |
U.S. Decennial Census

Bluewater was first listed as a CDP prior to the 2020 census.

== Education ==
It is in Gallup-McKinley County Public Schools.

It is zoned to Thoreau Elementary School, Thoreau Middle School, and Thoreau High School.
