= U.S. Route 366 (1932–1939) =

Former highway in the United States

U.S. Highway 366

Route information
- Auxiliary route of US 66
- Maintained by New Mexico State Highway Department
- Length: 73 mi (117 km)
- Existed: 1932–1939

Major junctions
- West end: US 66 / US 85 / NM 6 in Albuquerque
- East end: US 60 / NM 41 in Willard

Location
- Country: United States
- State: New Mexico

Highway system
- United States Numbered Highway System; List; Special; Divided; New Mexico State Highway System; Interstate; US; State; Scenic

U.S. Route 366 or US 366 was the designation of two child routes of the former U.S. Route 66 in New Mexico and Texas during the late 1920s and 1930s. Both alignments of US 366 were original U.S. Routes created in 1927. The first alignment was a route from El Paso, Texas to Amarillo, Texas crossing through New Mexico that existed until 1932. The second was a route from Albuquerque to Willard that was previously designated U.S. Route 470 before 1932. That alignment was canceled in 1939.

== History ==
This iteration of US 366 replaced US 470 in New Mexico, which was also one of the original routes of the 1927 AASHO log. The parent route of U.S. 470 was US 70 which it met at Willard. The route as published proceeded from Willard through Moriarty ending at Albuquerque for at total of 73 miles (117 km). US 470 followed part of the route of NM 41 north from Willard to Moriarty, and NM 6 west to Albuquerque where it ended at the combined route of US 66 and US 85. US 470 was renamed US 366 when US 70 was relocated southward over the previous US 366 ending the parent route connection, but creating a new one with US 66. In the late 1930s, US 66 was rerouted south from its original path through Santa Fe over to NM 6 from Albuquerque to Santa Rosa including the section of US 366 west of Moriarty. At that time, US 366's designation was canceled, and the portion between Willard and Moriarty retained its NM 41 designation. The segment between Albuquerque and Moriarty is now part of I-40 and NM 333.

== Route description ==
The final alignment of US 366 began at the intersection of NM 6 with the combined routes US 66 and US 85 at Albuquerque in Bernalillo County. The route proceeded to the east along NM 6 and intersected NM 10 at Tijeras. The route then passed through Barton and then crossed the southwestern corner of Santa Fe County. The route then entered Torrance County where the route intersected NM 41 at Moriarty. The route then turned south along NM 41 and passed through Estancia before terminating at US 60 just west of Willard.

The 1930 state highway map described the route as a first class road usable all year. From Albuquerque to a point just west of Tijeras, the highway had an oiled and concrete surface. From that point to Barton, the highway had a gravel surface. From Barton to Moriarty, the surface was graded, and the surface was gravel beyond Moriarty to Willard.

== Major intersections ==
County	Location	mi	km	Destinations	Notes
Bernalillo	Albuquerque	0	0.0	US 66 / US 85 / NM 6 west – Los Lunas, Santa Fe	Western end of NM 6 overlap
Bernalillo	Tijeras	16	26	NM 10	
Santa Fe	No major junctions				
Torrance	Moriarty	39	63	NM 6 east / NM 41 north – Santa Fe, Santa Rosa	Eastern end of NM 6 overlap; northern end of NM 41 overlap
Torrance	Estancia	55	89	NM 15	
Torrance	Willard	66	106	US 60 / NM 41 south – Socorro, Fort Sumner	Southern end of NM 41 overlap
1.000 mi = 1.609 km; 1.000 km = 0.621 mi
