= New Mexico State Road 606 =

State highway in New Mexico, United States

State Road 606
- NM 606 highlighted in red

Route information
- Maintained by NMDOT
- Length: 1.250 mi (2.012 km)

Major junctions
- North end: NM 122 near Bluewater Village
- I-40 near Bluewater Village
- South end: Main Street in Bluewater Village

Location
- Country: United States
- State: New Mexico
- Counties: Cibola

Highway system
- New Mexico State Highway System; Interstate; US; State; Scenic
| ← NM 605 | → NM 608 |

State Road 606 (NM 606) is a 1 1/4-mile-long (2.0 km) state highway in the US state of New Mexico. NM 606's southern terminus is at the end of state maintenance at Main Street in Bluewater Village, and the northern terminus is at NM 122 northeast of Bluewater Village.

== Major intersections ==
Milemakers goes through an inverse pattern. The entire route is in Cibola County.

| Location | mi | km | Destinations | Notes |
|---|---|---|---|---|
| | 0.000 | 0.000 | NM 122 | Northern terminus |
| | 0.076 | 0.122 | I-40 | I-40 exit 72 |
| Bluewater Village | 1.250 | 2.012 | Main Street | Southern terminus |
1.000 mi = 1.609 km; 1.000 km = 0.621 mi
