= Continental Divide, New Mexico =

Unincorporated community in McKinley County, New Mexico, United States

- Census-designated place
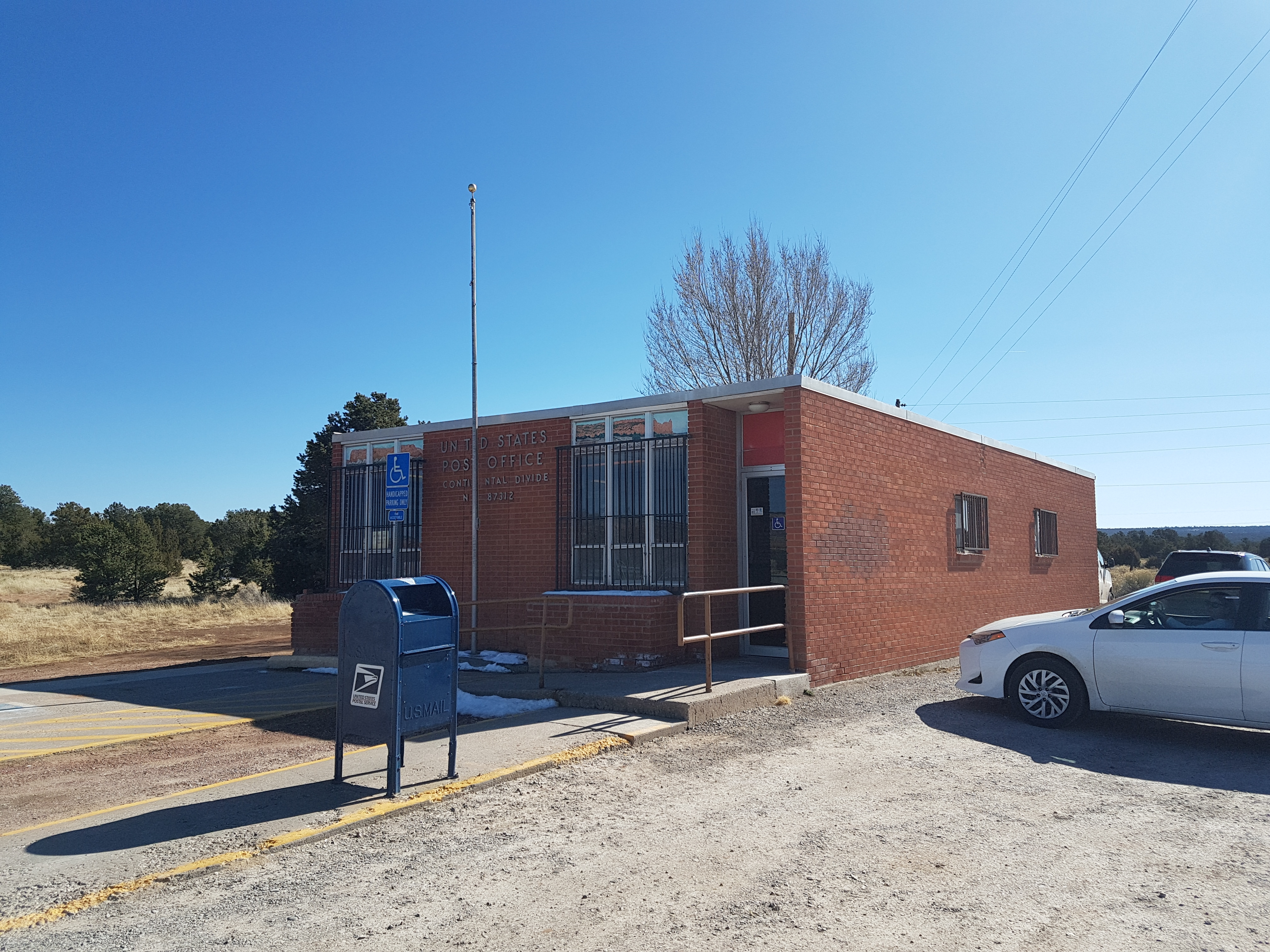
- Post office in Continental Divide, March 2018

- Location within New Mexico Location within the United States
- Coordinates: 35°25′58″N 108°20′09″W
- Country: United States
- State: New Mexico
- County: McKinley

Area
  - Total: 2.73 sq mi (7.1 km^{2})
  - Land: 2.73 sq mi (7.1 km^{2})
  - Water: 0.00 sq mi (0 km^{2})
- Elevation: 7,176 ft (2,187 m)

Population (2020)
  - Total: 187
  - Density: 68.6/sq mi (26.5/km^{2})
- Time zone: UTC-7 (Mountain (MST))
  - Summer (DST): UTC-6 (MDT)
- ZIP code: 87312
- Area code: 505
- GNIS feature ID: 2806714
- FIPS code: 35-17330

Continental Divide is an unincorporated community and census-designated place (CDP) in McKinley County, New Mexico, United States. It has a post office with ZIP code 87312. As of the 2020 census, it had a population of 187.

== Geography ==
The community is located in central McKinley County along Interstate 40, 25 miles (40 km) east-southeast of Gallup, at Campbell Pass, a low point along the Continental Divide of the Americas. The center of the community sits at an elevation of 7,228 feet (2,203 m), just west of the height of land.

According to the U.S. Census Bureau, the CDP has an area of 2.73 square miles (7.07 km^{2}), all land. The area west of the Continental Divide is drained by the South Fork of the Puerco River, a tributary of the Little Colorado River, while the area east of the divide drains through Mitchell Draw toward the Rio San Jose, part of the Rio Puerco watershed leading to the Rio Grande.

== Demographics ==
Historical population
| Census | Pop. | Note | %± |
|---|---|---|---|
| 2020 | 187 | | — |
U.S. Decennial Census

The community was first listed as a census-designated place prior to the 2020 census.

== Education ==
The community is in Gallup-McKinley County Public Schools. Zoned schools are Thoreau Elementary School, Thoreau Middle School, and Thoreau High School.

== Transportation ==
=== Major highways ===
- Interstate 40
- Historic U.S. Route 66
- New Mexico State Road 122
