= U.S. Route 366 =

U.S. Route 366 was the designation for two U.S. Numbered Highways in the United States, both of which were related to US 66:

- U.S. Route 366 (1927–1932), a route connecting El Paso and Amarillo in Texas, by way of Clovis, New Mexico
- U.S. Route 366 (1932–1939), a route connecting Albuquerque and Willard in New Mexico

== See also ==
- List of United States Numbered Highways
