= New Mexico State Road 610 =

State highway in New Mexico, United States

State Road 610

Route information
- Maintained by NMDOT
- Length: 2.020 mi (3.251 km)

Major junctions
- South end: NM 602 in Gallup
- NM 118 in Gallup
- North end: NM 609 in Gallup

Location
- Country: United States
- State: New Mexico
- Counties: McKinley

Highway system
- New Mexico State Highway System; Interstate; US; State; Scenic
← NM 609	→ NM 612

State Road 610 (NM 610) is a 2.0-mile-long (3.2 km) state highway in the US state of New Mexico. NM 610's southern terminus is at NM 602 in Gallup, and the northern terminus is at NM 609 in Gallup.

== Major intersections ==
The entire route is in Gallup, McKinley County.

mi	km	Destinations	Notes
0.000	0.000	NM 602	Southern terminus
1.800	2.897	NM 118 to I-40	To I-40 exit 26 via NM 118 east
2.020	3.251	NM 609	Northern terminus
1.000 mi = 1.609 km; 1.000 km = 0.621 mi
