= New Mexico State Road 609 =

State highway in New Mexico, United States

State Road 609
- NM 609 highlighted in red

Route information
- Maintained by NMDOT
- Length: 2.314 mi (3.724 km)

Major junctions
- West end: US 491 in Gallup
- NM 608 in Gallup; NM 610 in Gallup
- East end: NM 118 in Gallup

Location
- Country: United States
- State: New Mexico
- Counties: McKinley

Highway system
- New Mexico State Highway System; Interstate; US; State; Scenic
| ← NM 608 | → NM 610 |

State Road 609 (NM 609) is an approximately 2.3-mile-long (3.7 km) state highway in the US state of New Mexico. NM 609's western terminus is at U.S. Route 491 (US 491) in Gallup, and the eastern terminus is at NM 118 in Gallup.

== Major intersections ==
The entire route is in Gallup, McKinley County.

| mi | km | Destinations | Notes |
|---|---|---|---|
| 0.000 | 0.000 | US 491 | Western terminus |
| 0.352 | 0.566 | NM 608 north | Southern terminus of NM 608 |
| 0.928 | 1.493 | NM 610 south | Northern terminus of NM 610 |
| 2.314 | 3.724 | NM 118 | Eastern terminus |
1.000 mi = 1.609 km; 1.000 km = 0.621 mi
