= New Mexico State Road 509 =

State highway in New Mexico, United States

State Road 509

Route information
- Maintained by NMDOT
- Length: 36.5 mi (58.7 km)

Major junctions
- South end: NM 605 near Grants
- North end: Navajo Route 9 near Whitehorse

Location
- Country: United States
- State: New Mexico
- Counties: McKinley

Highway system
- New Mexico State Highway System; Interstate; US; State; Scenic
← NM 508	→ NM 510

State Road 509 (NM 509) is a 36.5-mile-long (58.7 km) state highway in the US state of New Mexico. NM 509's southern terminus is at NM 605 north of Grants, and the northern terminus is at Navajo Route 9 west of Whitehorse.

== Major intersections ==
The entire route is in McKinley County.

Location	mi	km	Destinations	Notes
	0.000	0.000	NM 605	Southern terminus
	36.500	58.741	Navajo Route 9	Northern terminus
1.000 mi = 1.609 km; 1.000 km = 0.621 mi
