= Rio Puerco Bridge =

Historic road bridge in Albuquerque, New Mexico, United States

- U.S. National Register of Historic Places
- NM State Register of Cultural Properties
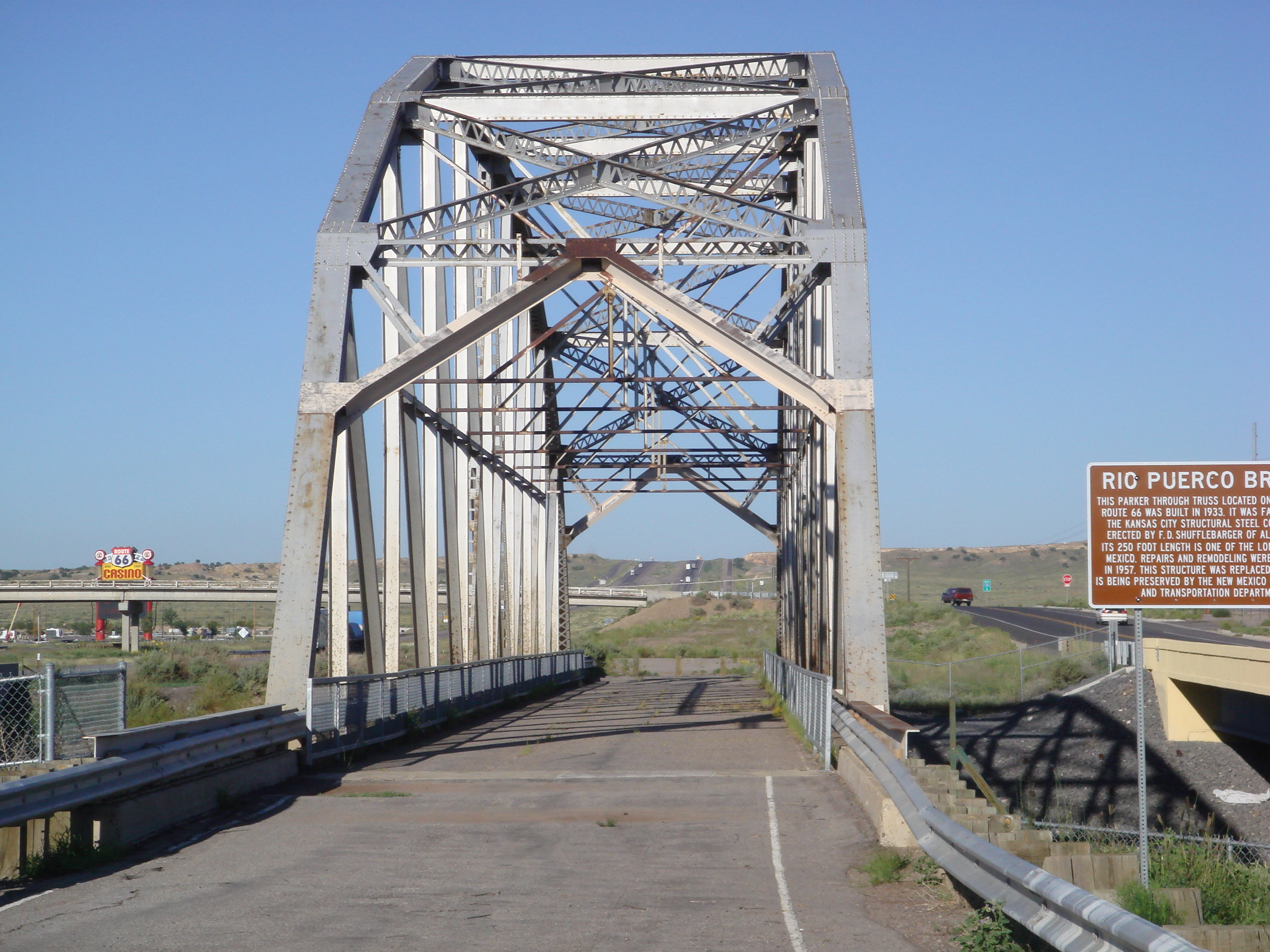
- Photo in 2006 shows it is already out of service

- Location within New Mexico Location within the United States
- Nearest city: Albuquerque, New Mexico
- Coordinates: 35°02′01″N 106°56′32″W
- Area: less than one acre
- Built: 1933
- Built by: Kansas City Structural Steel Company; F.D. Shufflebarger
- Architectural style: Parker through truss bridge
- MPS: Historic Highway Bridges of New Mexico MPS
- NRHP reference No.: 97000735
- NMSRCP No.: 1662

Significant dates
- Added to NRHP: July 15, 1997
- Designated NMSRCP: May 9, 1997

The Rio Puerco Bridge is a Parker through truss bridge located on historic U.S. Route 66 (US 66) in western Bernalillo County, New Mexico, United States, that is listed on the New Mexico State Register of Cultural Properties and the National Register of Historic Places (NRHP).

== Description ==
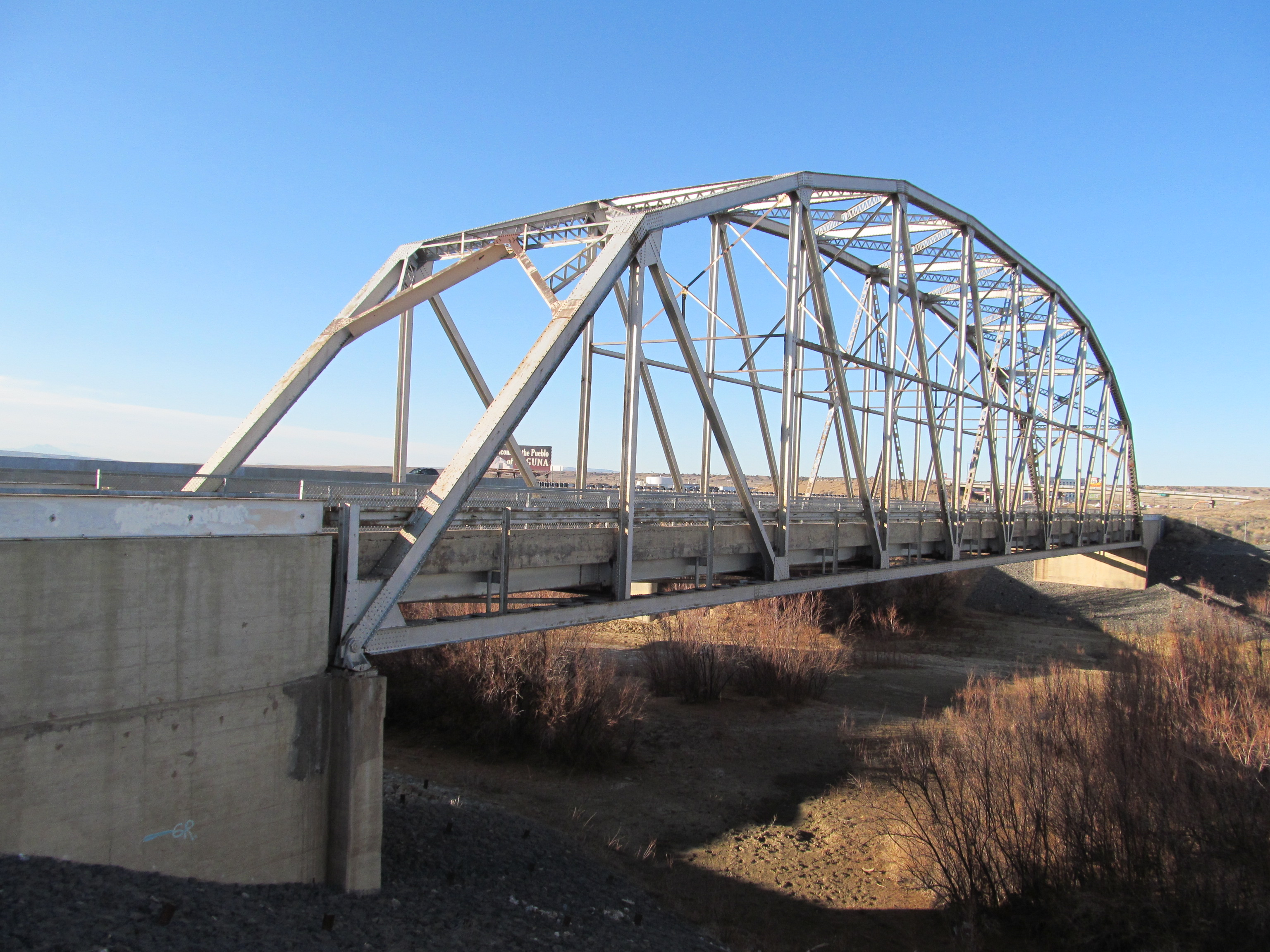
Photo in January 2012, showing sections

The bridge crosses the Rio Puerco and was built in 1933. It is located approximately 19 miles (31 km) west of Albuquerque.

It was built to carry a past alignment of US 66 over the Rio Puerco and carried a frontage road for Interstate 40 (I-40). Since 1999, it no longer carries vehicle traffic as a different frontage road bridge was built to bypass the original, but it is open to pedestrian only.

The single-span Parker through truss steel bridge was fabricated by the Kansas City Structural Steel Company and built by F.D. Shufflebarger in 1933. Its substructure includes two concrete piers and massive concrete abutments set upon timber pilings. The total bridge length is 330 feet (100 m), including the 250 feet (76 m) span, which has ten 25 feet (7.6 m) panels, and two 40 feet (12 m) approaches.

It is located 40 yards (37 m) north of the I-40, about 8.9 miles (14.3 km) west of I-40 westernmost exit at Albuquerque.

The bridge was added to the NRHP July 15, 1997.

== See also ==
- National Register of Historic Places listings in Bernalillo County, New Mexico
