= New Mexico State Road 608 =

State highway in New Mexico, United States

State Road 608
- NM 608 highlighted in red

Route information
- Maintained by NMDOT
- Length: 1.969 mi (3.169 km)

Major junctions
- South end: NM 609 in Gallup
- North end: US 491 near Gallup

Location
- Country: United States
- State: New Mexico
- Counties: McKinley

Highway system
- New Mexico State Highway System; Interstate; US; State; Scenic
| ← NM 606 | → NM 609 |

State Road 608 (NM 608) was a 1.969-mile-long (3.169 km) state highway in the US state of New Mexico. NM 608's southern terminus was at NM 609 in Gallup, and the northern terminus was at U.S. Route 491 (US 491) north of Gallup. NM 608 was given to the city of Gallup in 2017. The road is now known as Ninth Street.

== Major intersections ==
The entire route is in Gallup, McKinley County.

| mi | km | Destinations | Notes |
|---|---|---|---|
| 0.000 | 0.000 | NM 609 | Southern terminus |
| 1.969 | 3.169 | US 491 | Northern terminus |
1.000 mi = 1.609 km; 1.000 km = 0.621 mi
