= Casamero Pueblo =

Archaeological site in New Mexico, US

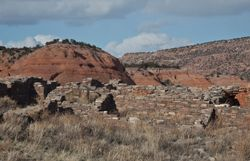
Casamera Pueblo in McKinley County, New Mexico, was an outlier of Chaco Canyon.

Casamero Pueblo is an archaeological site including the partially excavated and stabilized ruins of an 11th-century Ancestral Puebloan community in Prewitt, New Mexico, in McKinley County. It was an outlier of Chaco Canyon. It is on the Trail of the Ancients Scenic Byway.

== Geography ==
The ruins are located on McKinley County Road 19, near Tecolote Mesa. Tecolote means "owl", and the red sandstone mesa has a formation that looks like the eyes of an owl.

== History ==
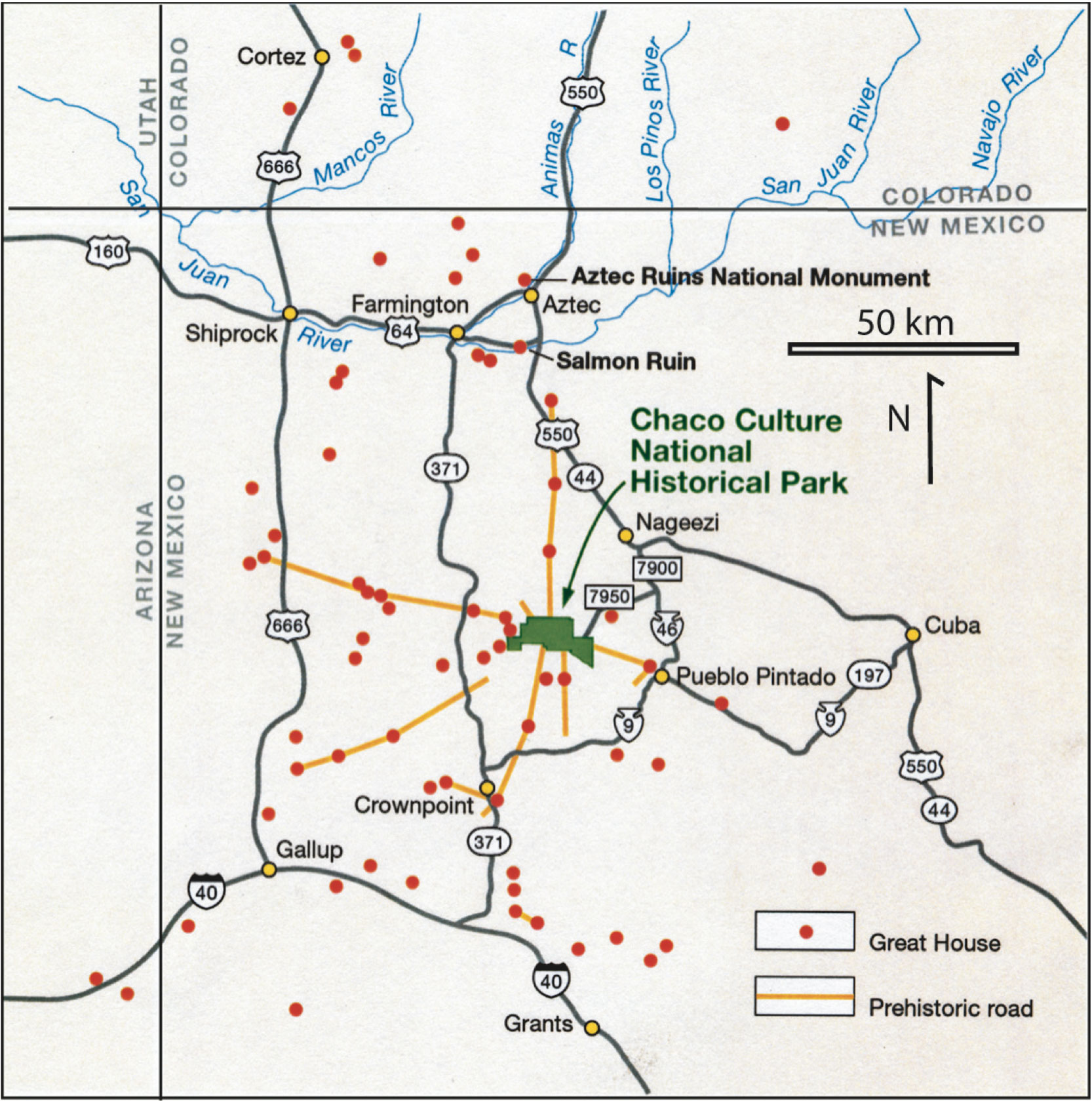
Chaco Canyon and prehistoric roads. Casamero Pueblo is slightly north of 40 and east of 471. It had a road to its nearby outlier, Andrews Ranch.

Casamero Pueblo was an outlier of Chaco Canyon between about 1000 to 1125. Built with core-veneer masonry, the pueblo has 22 rooms on the ground floor and may have had 6 rooms on the second story. The settlement had 37 or more additional sites, many masonry dwellings, and a Great Kiva. Andrews Ranch, an outlier within the vicinity, was connected to the pueblo via a Chacoan road.

Between 1966 and 1967 the pueblo was excavated. The masonry was subsequently stabilized.

== Facilities ==
The ruins are open throughout the year and are accessed via a short trail from the parking lot.

Coordinates: 35.426176°N 108.053635°W
