= New Mexico State Road 605 =

State highway in New Mexico, United States

State Road 605
- NM 605 highlighted in red

Route information
- Maintained by NMDOT
- Length: 22.234 mi (35.782 km)

Major junctions
- South end: NM 122 / Historic US 66 in Milan
- North end: San Mateo

Location
- Country: United States
- State: New Mexico
- Counties: Cibola, McKinley

Highway system
- New Mexico State Highway System; Interstate; US; State; Scenic
← NM 603	→ NM 606

State Road 605 (NM 605) is a 22.2-mile-long (35.7 km) state highway in the US state of New Mexico. NM 605's southern terminus is at NM 122 in Milan, and the northern terminus is in San Mateo.

== Major intersections ==
County	Location	mi	km	Destinations	Notes
Cibola	Milan	0.000	0.000	NM 122 / Historic US 66	Southern terminus
McKinley		12.688	20.419	NM 509 north	Southern terminus of NM 509
Cibola	San Mateo	22.234	35.782	Northern terminus	
1.000 mi = 1.609 km; 1.000 km = 0.621 mi
