= Thoreau High School =

High school in New Mexico, United States

Coordinates: 35.4181°N 108.2318°W

Information
- Established: 1965; 61 years ago
- School district: Gallup-McKinley County Schools
- Website: www.gmcs.org/o/thhs

Thoreau High School is a public high school in Thoreau, New Mexico. It is a part of Gallup-McKinley County Schools.

Communities in its boundary include Thoreau, Continental Divide, Prewitt, and Smith Lake.

== History ==
In 1964 the Navajo Tribal Council's advisory committee voted to allow for fewer than 80 acres (32 hectares) of land in Thoreau for the school district so it could establish Thoreau High School there; the tribe would get the land back the moment the land is not used for education purposes. The land was to include apartment buildings for faculty.

The high school began in 1965 with grade 9, with other years added later. While an elementary school existed in the area previously, the number of students made the community decide it wanted a local high school. Previously area Native Americans attended boarding schools elsewhere. By 1969, enrollment exceeded 400, and the teaching staff numbered 21. Over 75% of the students were Native Americans. The proposal was for 28,000 square feet (2,600 m^{2}) of building area.

The GMCS board of trustees began to quarrel with the architectural form, Kruger, Lake, and Henderson, because the federal government had delayed approving the architectural plans for the school on the basis of ensuring the school had enough sources of water. Construction ended in the 1967–1968 school year.

== Campus ==
The field used for American football games was spearheaded by the school's booster club, and members of the local community built it.
