= Rio San Jose =

River in New Mexico, United States

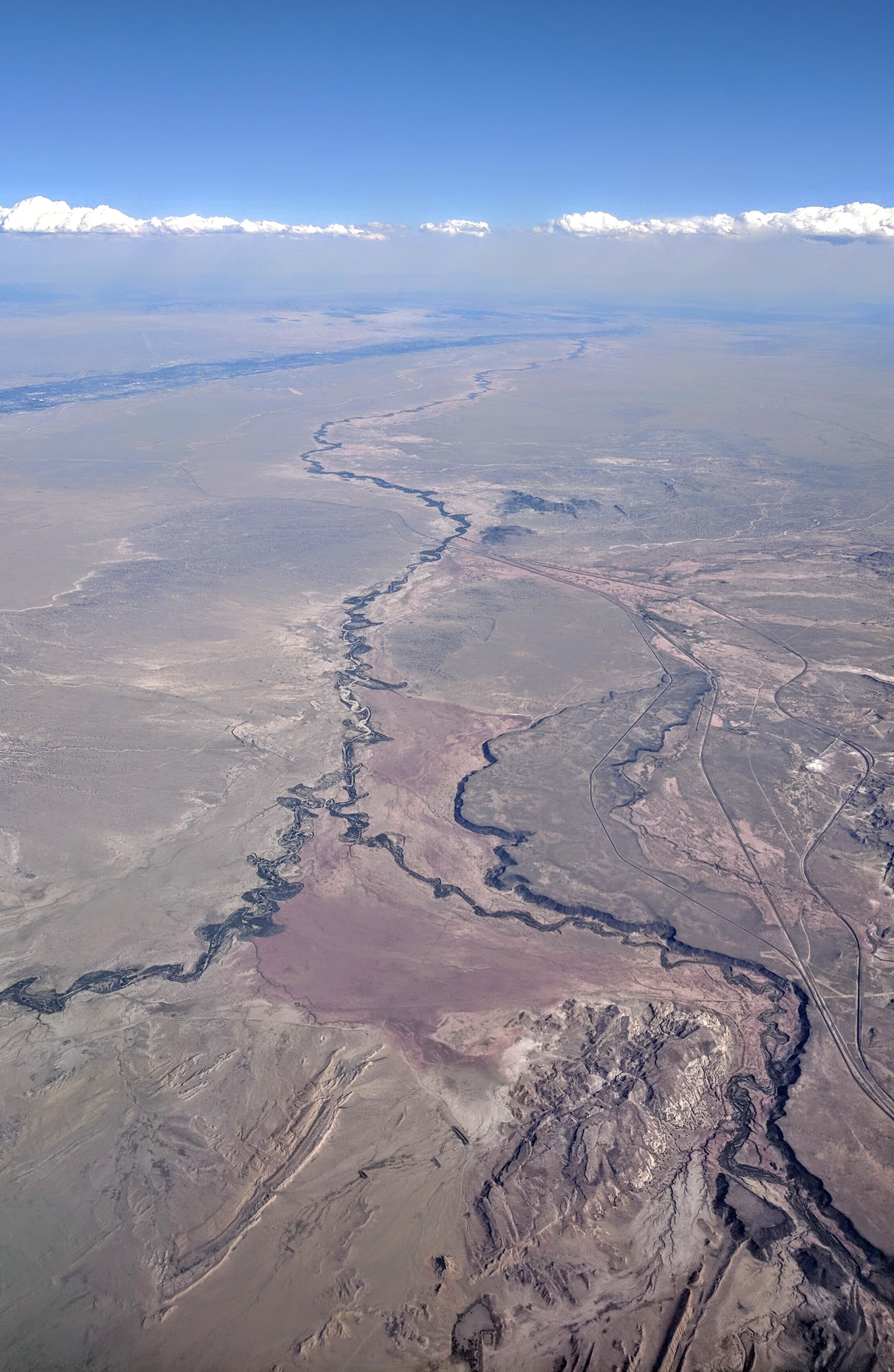
- Aerial view from west of Albuquerque of the last few miles of the Rio San Jose (bottom right) as it merges with the Rio Puerco, which flows to the Rio Grande in the distance

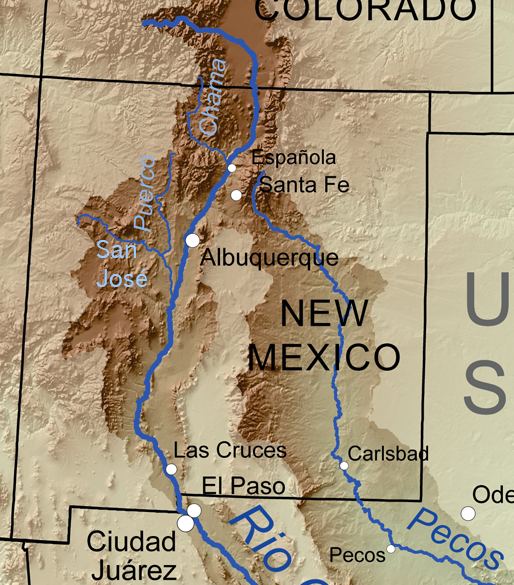
- Map of the Rio Grande watershed, showing the Rio San Jose joining the Rio Puerco near Albuquerque

Location
- Country: United States
- State: New Mexico
- County: Cibola, Valencia, Bernalillo

Physical characteristics
- Source: Zuni Mountains
  - location: Bluewater Village, Valencia County
  - coordinates: 35°17′14″N 107°59′58″W
  - elevation: 6,651 ft (2,027 m)
- Mouth: Rio Puerco
  - location: near Isleta Pueblo, Bernalillo County
  - coordinates: 34°52′50″N 107°01′40″W
  - elevation: 5,102 ft (1,555 m)
- Length: 90 mi (140 km)
- Basin size: 2,597 sq mi (6,730 km^{2})

The Rio San Jose is a 90-mile-long (145 km) tributary of the Rio Puerco in the U.S. state of New Mexico.

== Course ==
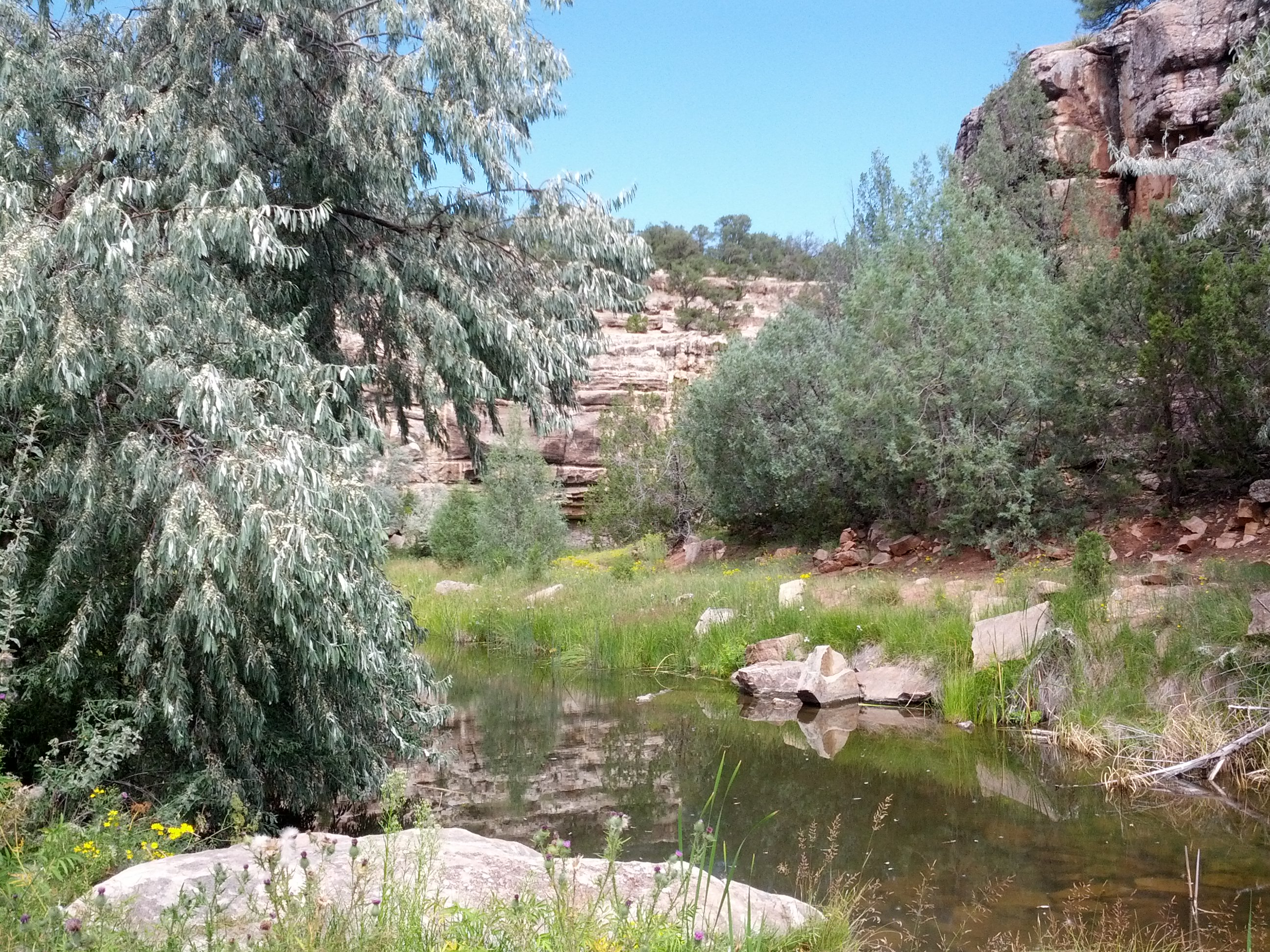
Bluewater Creek

The Rio San Jose's farthest tributary stream is Bluewater Creek; its headwaters are in the Zuni Mountains, near the continental divide in Cibola County, with about 400 feet of the course in McKinley County. Bluewater Creek is dammed to form Bluewater Lake, with a capacity of 43,500 acre-feet (53,700,000 m^{3}). The Rio San Jose proper starts at the confluence of Bluewater Creek and Mitchell Draw near Bluewater Village. Entering Valencia County, it flows southeast, through Grants, then turning east near McCartys, flowing through the Acoma Indian Reservation and Laguna Pueblo. The remains of an ancient dam constructed by the Laguna people sometime between 1370 and 1750 AD is situated within Laguna Pueblo. Below Mesita the river turns southeast again, flowing through a narrow canyon before joining the Rio Puerco in Bernalillo County.

The entire course of the river below Bluewater Creek is roughly paralleled by the BNSF Railway tracks (formerly the Atlantic and Pacific Railroad, built around 1882, later absorbed into the AT&SF). Between Bluewater Village and Mesita the river valley provides the route for old U.S. Route 66 and I-40.

== Hydrology ==
The water level and streamflow of the Rio San Jose has been measured at a number of sites in Cibola County, New Mexico. Stream gauges have been operated by the USGS near Laguna, Correo, and at Acoma Pueblo, near Grants.

The gauge at Acoma Pueblo has a record that commenced in 1937, and is the only one still active. It measures flow from a contributing area of 1,170 square miles (3,000 km^{2}), from a larger drainage basin of 2,300 square miles (6,000 km^{2}). The mean flow between 1937 and 2016 was 6 cubic feet per second (0.17 m^{3}/s), with the lowest daily flow recorded in July 2014 at 1.3 cubic feet per second (0.037 m^{3}/s).

The highest river level recorded occurred in September 1963 with a height of 4.87 feet (1.48 m) through the gauge, giving a corresponding flow of 1,400 cubic feet per second (40 m^{3}/s), although this peak flow was affected by diversion or regulation.

Since the 1870s the flow of the upper river has been substantially modified by demands for irrigation, groundwater abstraction and a dam on the Bluewater Creek. A report in 1982 showed that the natural flow was estimated to be between 16.6 cubic feet per second (0.47 m^{3}/s) and 19.3 cubic feet per second (0.55 m^{3}/s), as opposed to the measured mean flow of 6.7 cubic feet per second (0.19 m^{3}/s).

== See also ==
- List of rivers of New Mexico
