= Moriarty, New Mexico =

- City
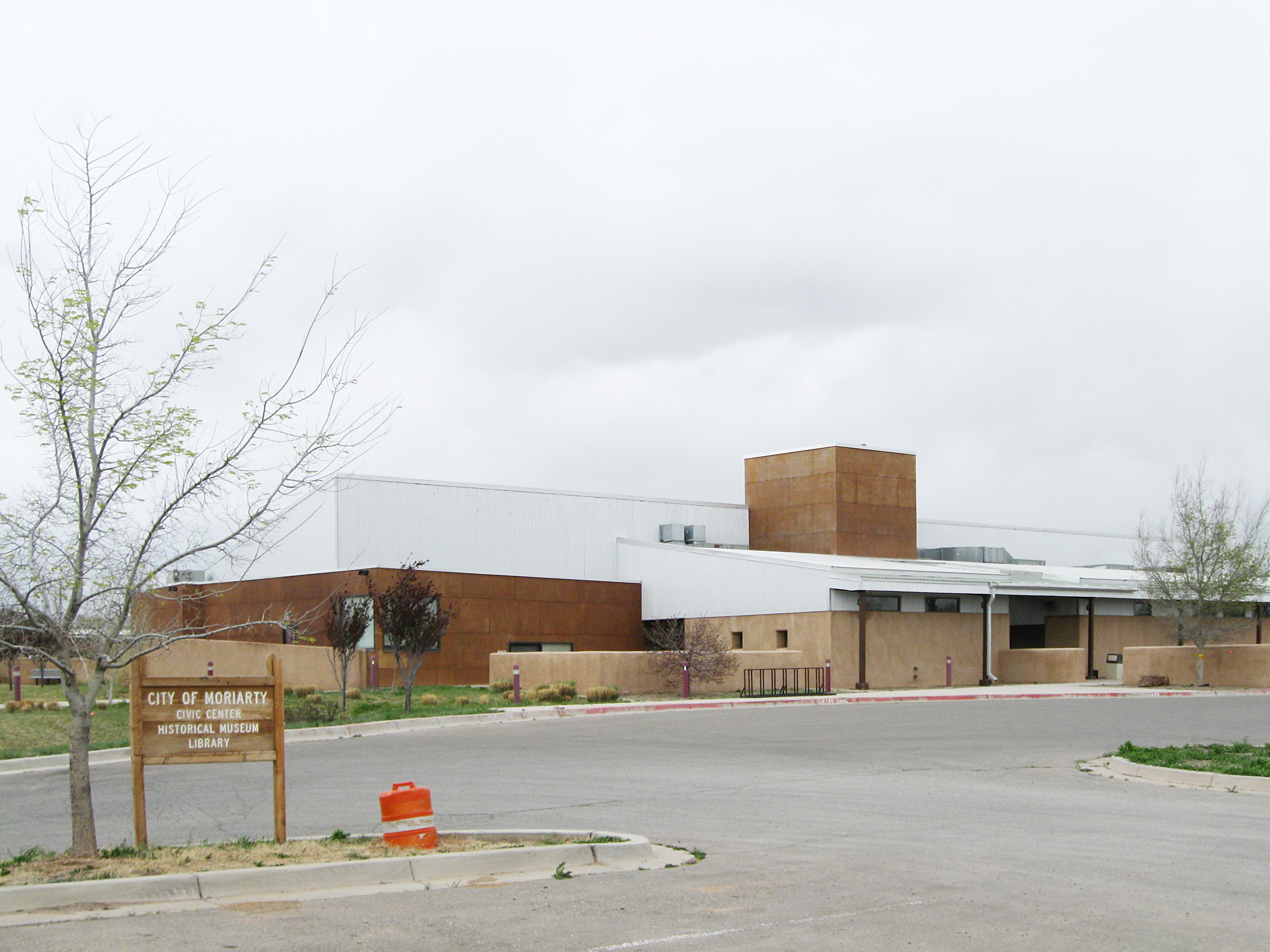
- Moriarty Civic Center

- Location of Moriarty, New Mexico

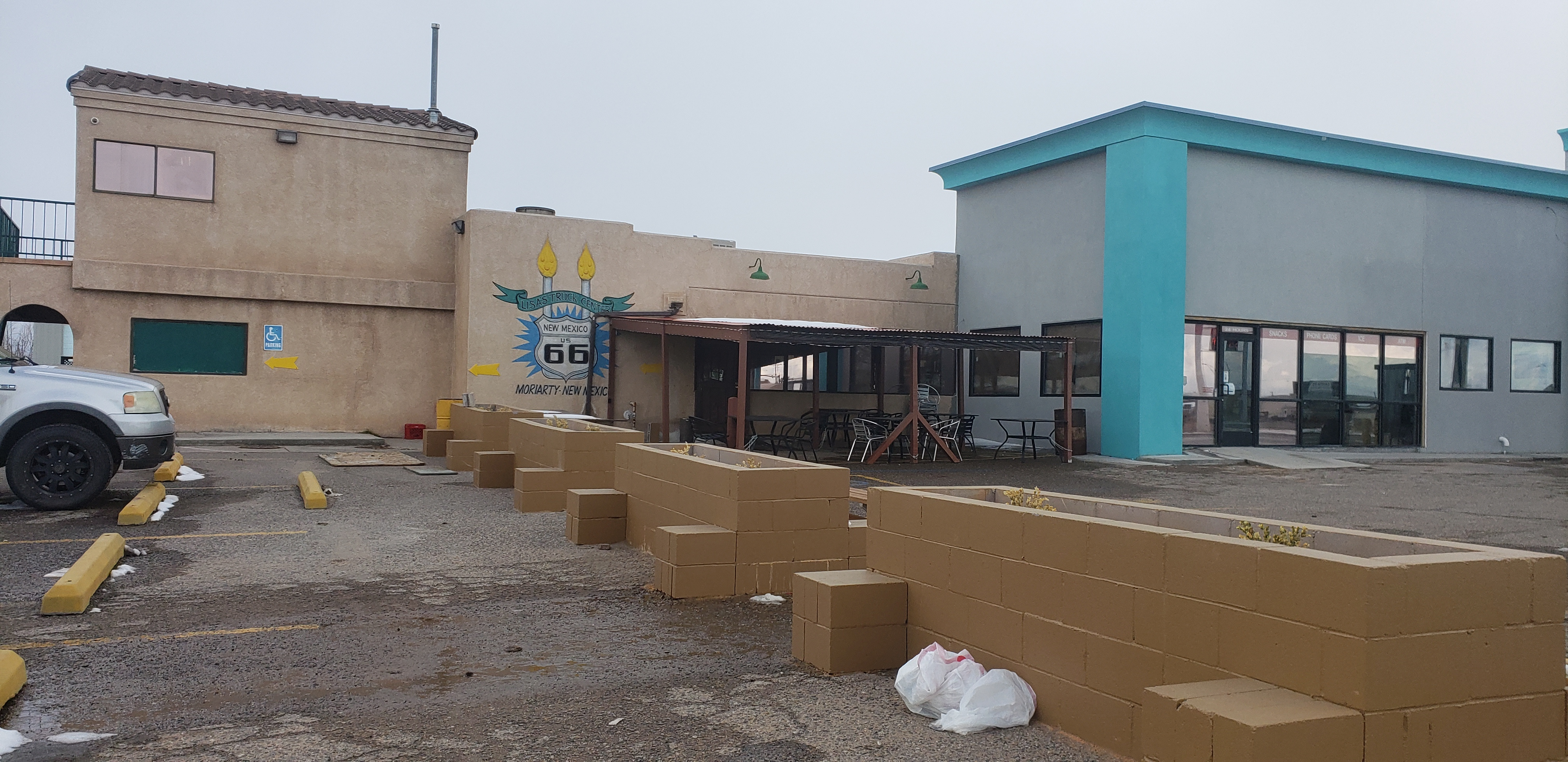
- Lisa's Truck Center

- Location in the United States
- Coordinates: 34°59′35″N 106°02′40″W
- Country: United States
- State: New Mexico
- County: Torrance

Area
  - Total: 6.93 sq mi (17.96 km^{2})
  - Land: 6.93 sq mi (17.96 km^{2})
  - Water: 0 sq mi (0.00 km^{2})
- Elevation: 6,224 ft (1,897 m)

Population (2020)
  - Total: 1,946
  - Density: 288.5/sq mi (111.39/km^{2})
- Time zone: UTC-7 (Mountain (MST))
  - Summer (DST): UTC-6 (MDT)
- ZIP code: 87035
- Area code: 505
- FIPS code: 35-50160
- GNIS feature ID: 2411165
- Website: www.cityofmoriarty.org

Moriarty is a city in Torrance County, New Mexico, United States. The population was 1,946 at the 2020 census. It is located about ten miles east of Edgewood, and shares a school district with the town, despite them being in separate counties (Edgewood is in Santa Fe County).

== Geography ==
According to the United States Census Bureau, the city has a total area of 4.8 square miles (12 km^{2}), all land.

=== Climate ===
Climate data for Moriarty, New Mexico (Elevation 6,220ft)
Month	Jan	Feb	Mar	Apr	May	Jun	Jul	Aug	Sep	Oct	Nov	Dec	Year
Record high °F (°C)	68 (20)	70 (21)	81 (27)	85 (29)	94 (34)	97 (36)	100 (38)	96 (36)	92 (33)	85 (29)	77 (25)	67 (19)	100 (38)
Mean daily maximum °F (°C)	46.4 (8.0)	49.7 (9.8)	58.6 (14.8)	67.3 (19.6)	76.6 (24.8)	86.7 (30.4)	88.1 (31.2)	85.4 (29.7)	79.8 (26.6)	68.5 (20.3)	56.8 (13.8)	45.4 (7.4)	67.4 (19.7)
Mean daily minimum °F (°C)	15.6 (−9.1)	18.7 (−7.4)	24.1 (−4.4)	31.0 (−0.6)	40.1 (4.5)	48.5 (9.2)	54.5 (12.5)	52.5 (11.4)	44.1 (6.7)	33.9 (1.1)	22.3 (−5.4)	15.9 (−8.9)	33.4 (0.8)
Record low °F (°C)	−9 (−23)	−9 (−23)	−10 (−23)	13 (−11)	16 (−9)	32 (0)	40 (4)	41 (5)	25 (−4)	14 (−10)	−1 (−18)	−16 (−27)	−16 (−27)
Average precipitation inches (mm)	0.48 (12)	0.44 (11)	0.79 (20)	0.57 (14)	0.82 (21)	0.70 (18)	2.19 (56)	1.87 (47)	1.37 (35)	1.32 (34)	0.59 (15)	0.75 (19)	11.90 (302)
Average snowfall inches (cm)	4.0 (10)	4.4 (11)	5.2 (13)	0.9 (2.3)	0 (0)	0 (0)	0 (0)	0 (0)	0 (0)	0.4 (1.0)	2.5 (6.4)	6.8 (17)	24.0 (61)
Source: The Western Regional Climate Center

== Culture ==
Every October, Moriarty plays host to the Pinto Bean Fiesta, which is composed of a bunch of simple games in Crosley Park, as well as a parade and crowning of a "Pinto Bean Queen."

The Albuquerque Soaring Club (ASC), established in 1960 in Albuquerque, New Mexico, is currently headquartered at the Moriarty Municipal Airport. Moriarty boasts some of the finest year round soaring conditions in the United States, including 15 knot thermals to 22,000 ft, mountain wave to 34,000 ft, and orographic lift off the Manzano, Sandia, Ortiz, and Sangre de Cristo mountain ranges. Many flights in excess of 300 miles are recorded each year. Many pilots have achieved all of their soaring diamonds out of Moriarty. Moriarty airport is also home to the United States Southwest Soaring Museum, and has a commercial glider operation, Sundance Aviation.

Moriarty is a popular destination for fireworks for people in the Albuquerque metropolitan area, with two year around stores as well as at least two other large tents which set up for the sixteen-day selling period allowed by New Mexico State Law from June 20 to July 6. All vendors are located along old US 66 and competition is always fierce. Almost all Class C fireworks are allowed for sale and use in Moriarty including firecrackers, mortars, Roman candles, and cakes up to 500 grams (the maximum allowance), and although bottle rockets have been banned throughout New Mexico for the last three years, larger stick rockets are still allowed.

Moriarty is named after the first permanent settler in the town, Michael Timothy Moriarty.

== Demographics ==
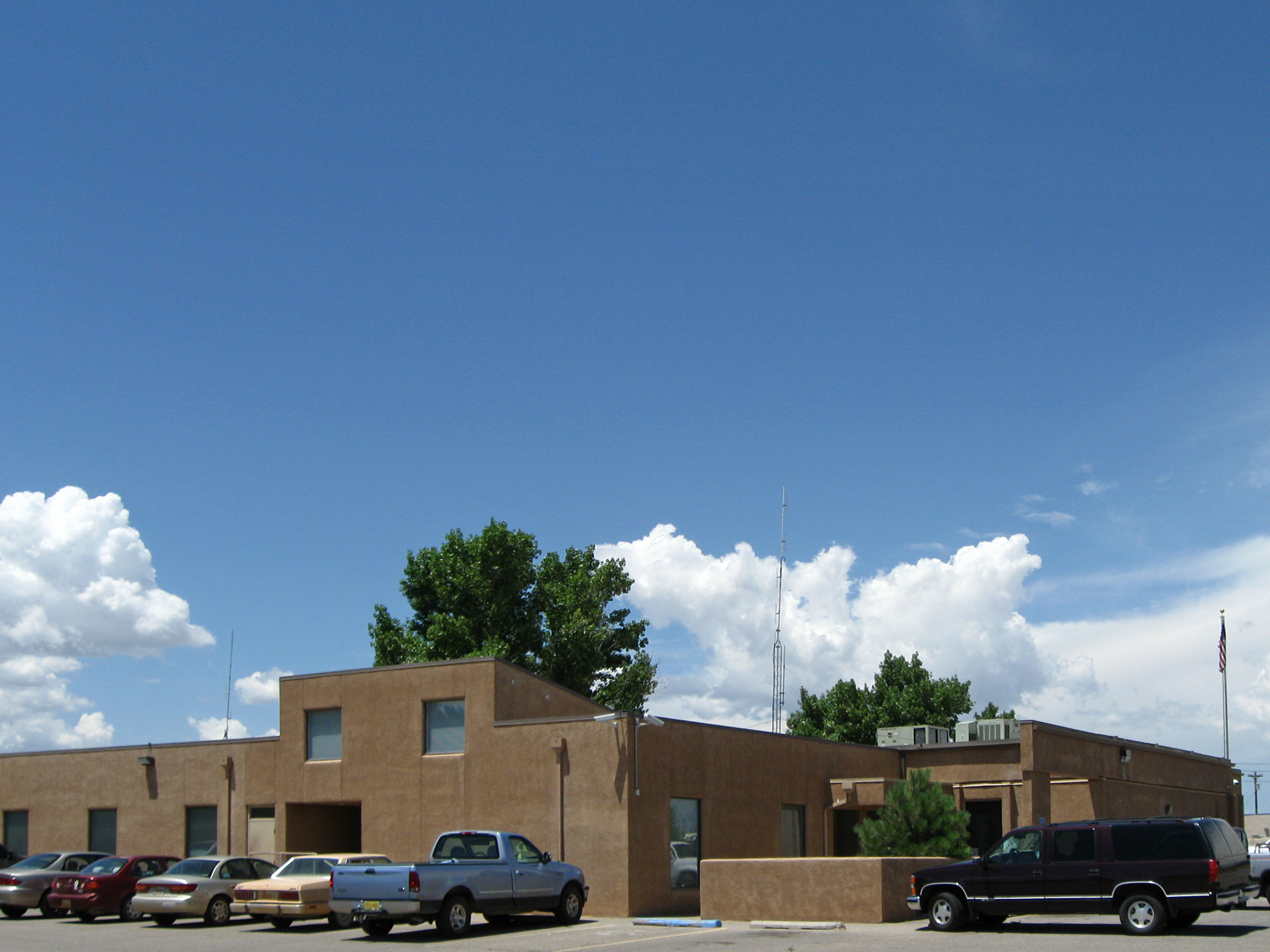
Moriarty Municipal Center

Historical population
Census	Pop.	Note	%±
1960	720		—
1970	758		5.3%
1980	1,276		68.3%
1990	1,399		9.6%
2000	1,765		26.2%
2010	1,910		8.2%
2020	1,946		1.9%
U.S. Decennial Census

Moriarty is part of the Albuquerque metropolitan area.

As of the census of 2000, there were 1,765 people, 668 households, and 478 families residing in the city. The population density was 368.2 inhabitants per square mile (142.2/km^{2}). There were 775 housing units at an average density of 161.7 units per square mile (62.4 units/km^{2}). The racial makeup of the city was 73.54% White, 0.62% African American, 2.49% Native American, 0.28% Asian, 0.06% Pacific Islander, 18.75% from other races, and 4.25% from two or more races. Hispanic or Latino of any race were 40.79% of the population.

There were 668 households, out of which 41.6% had children under the age of 18 living with them, 47.5% were married couples living together, 19.9% had a female householder with no husband present, and 28.3% were non-families. 24.3% of all households were made up of individuals, and 9.1% had someone living alone who was 65 years of age or older. The average household size was 2.64 and the average family size was 3.12.

In the city, 33.6% of the population was under the age of 18, 7.4% from 18 to 24, 28.3% from 25 to 44, 20.0% from 45 to 64, and 10.8% who were 65 years of age or older. The median age was 32 years. For every 100 females, there were 86.2 males. For every 100 females age 18 and over, there were 85.2 males.

The median income for a household in the city was $25,150, and the median income for a family was $31,957. Males had a median income of $24,345 versus $20,000 for females. The per capita income for the city was $13,640. About 13.3% of families and 18.0% of the population were below the poverty line, including 21.8% of those under age 18 and 18.3% of those age 65 or over.

== Notable people ==
- Toney Anaya – Governor of New Mexico from 1983 to 1987; born in Moriarty
- Kyle Blanks – former professional baseball player who played with the San Diego Padres
- Alice King – former First Lady of New Mexico (1971–1975, 1979–1983, 1991–1995)
- Tim Means – mixed martial artist
