= Luna Lodge =

Historic place in New Mexico, United States

- U.S. National Register of Historic Places
- NM State Register of Cultural Properties
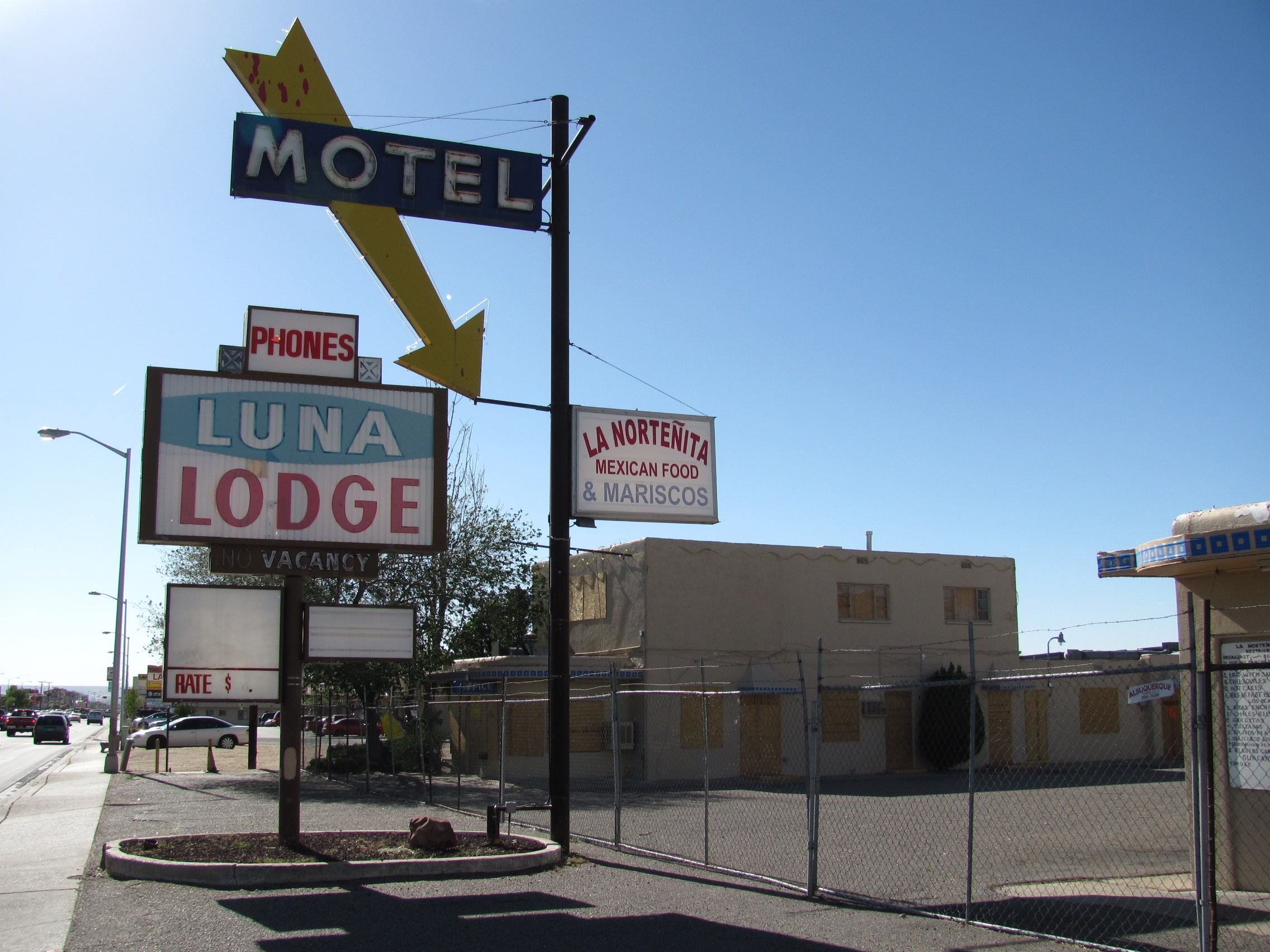
- The motel in 2010

- Location within New Mexico Location within the United States
- Location: 9119 Central Ave. NE, Albuquerque, New Mexico
- Coordinates: 35°4′25″N 106°32′43″W
- Built: 1949
- NRHP reference No.: 98000600
- NMSRCP No.: 1694

Significant dates
- Added to NRHP: June 11, 1998
- Designated NMSRCP: April 3, 1998

The Luna Lodge is a historic motel on Central Avenue (former U.S. Route 66) in Albuquerque, New Mexico, which is notable as one of the best-preserved Route 66 era motels remaining in the city. It was built in 1949 and was one of the easternmost Albuquerque motels, located about 6 miles (9.7 km) from the city center. The motel eventually closed and fell into disrepair, but was restored and converted to low-income housing in 2013. The property was added to the New Mexico State Register of Cultural Properties and the National Register of Historic Places in 1998.

The motel consists of three buildings arranged in a narrow U shape around a central parking lot, with 28 rooms in total. The building on the west side has a two-story portion at the front, containing the office on the ground floor and the manager's residence above. The remainder of the motel is one story. The eastern building had a small cafe at the front. The architecture is southwestern vernacular with some Streamline Moderne elements including the rounded front office.

== See also ==
- List of motels
