= Prewitt, New Mexico =

Unincorporated community in New Mexico, United States

Prewitt, New Mexico Kin Łigaaí (Navajo) Baca
- Census-designated place
- Location within New Mexico Location within the United States
- Coordinates: 35°22′46″N 108°05′12″W
- Country: United States
- State: New Mexico
- County: McKinley

Area
  - Total: 13.82 sq mi (35.80 km^{2})
  - Land: 13.82 sq mi (35.80 km^{2})
  - Water: 0 sq mi (0.00 km^{2})
- Elevation: 6,897 ft (2,102 m)

Population (2020)
  - Total: 842
  - Density: 60.9/sq mi (23.52/km^{2})
- Time zone: UTC-7 (Mountain (MST))
  - Summer (DST): UTC-6 (MDT)
- ZIP code: 87045
- Area code: 505
- GNIS feature ID: 2806729
- FIPS code: 35-59540

Prewitt (Navajo: Kin Łigaaí) is an unincorporated community and census-designated place (CDP) in McKinley County, New Mexico, United States. It is located along Interstate 40, 20 miles (32 km) northwest of Grants. Prewitt has a post office with ZIP code 87045. As of the 2020 census, the population of Prewitt was 842.

== Geography ==
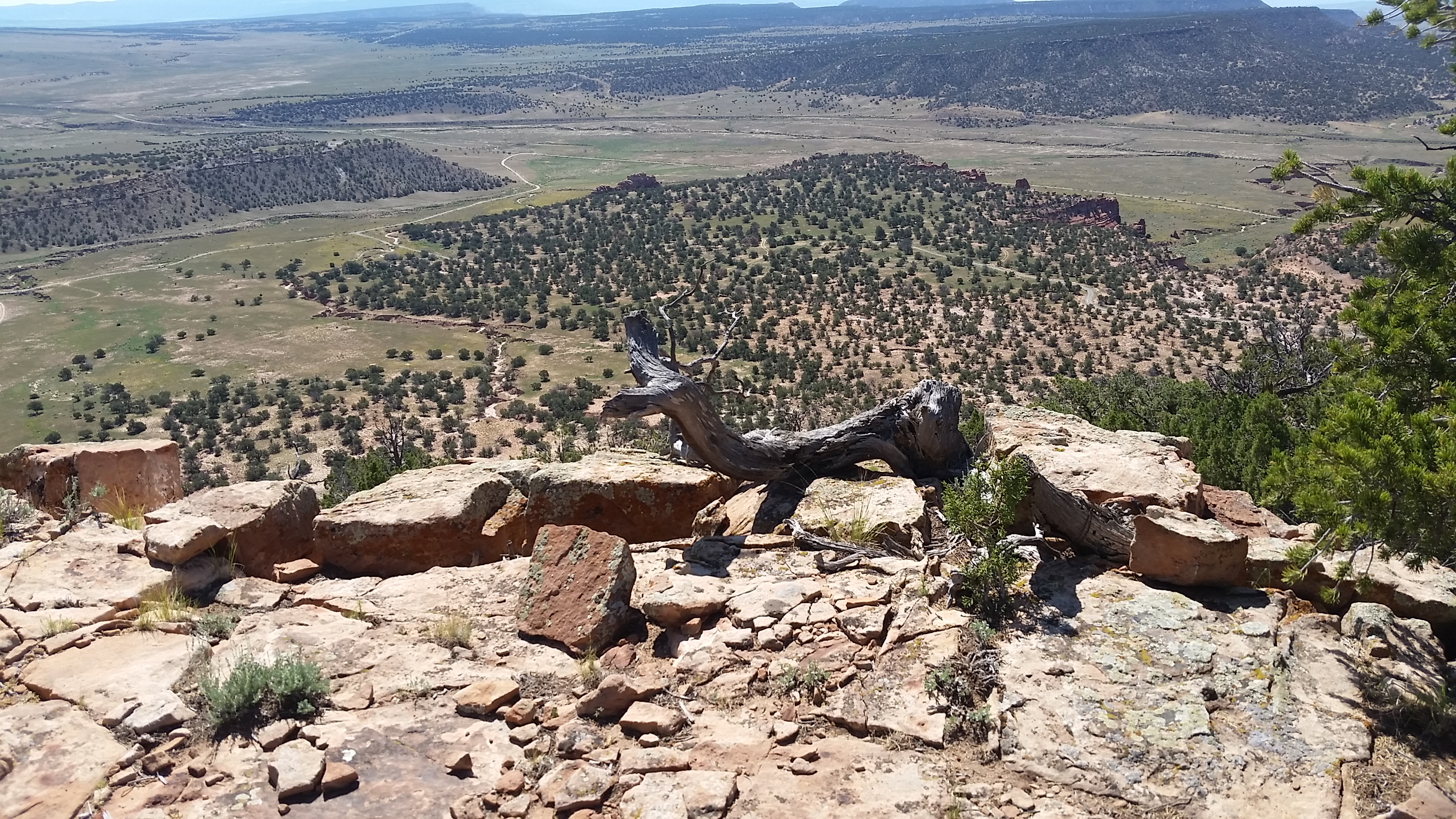
Typical landscape in Prewitt, NM (87045)

Prewitt is within the Baca/Prewitt (Kin Łigaaí) Chapter House boundary in the "Checkerboard Area" of the Navajo Nation. This means that Prewitt lies within the external boundaries of the Navajo Nation, but contains a mix of tribal, BLM, state, and private lands. It is a part of the Zuni Uplift, and is characterized by piñon/juniper woodland, red rock hoodoos, mesas, and desert grasslands.

Prewitt is in eastern McKinley County, along Interstate 40, 41 miles (66 km) east of Gallup, the county seat, 20 miles (32 km) northwest of Grants, and 95 miles (153 km) west of Albuquerque. According to the U.S. Census Bureau, the Prewitt CDP has an area of 13.8 square miles (36 km^{2}), all land. The community is drained by Mitchell Draw, which runs southeast toward the Rio San Jose, a tributary of the Rio Puerco leading southeast to the Rio Grande.

== Demographics ==
Historical population
Census	Pop.	Note	%±
2020	842		—
U.S. Decennial Census

Prewitt was first listed as a census-designated place prior to the 2020 census, covering a smaller population than that covered by the Prewitt ZIP Code area.

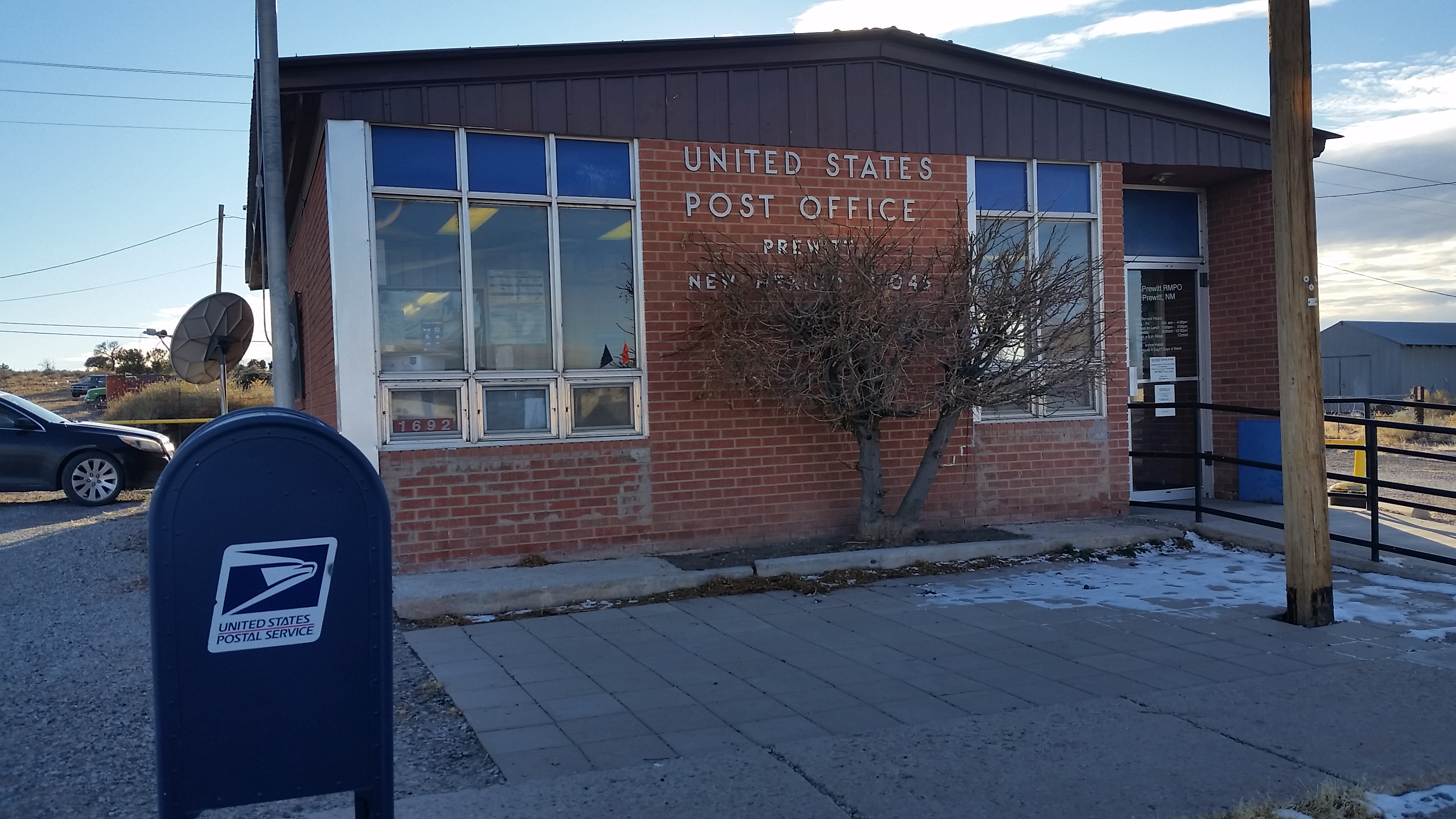
Prewitt Post Office (87045)

2019 Census estimates for Prewitt (ZIP code 87045)
	Estimate	Percent
Total population	1572	100%
Male	773	49.2%
Female	799	50.8%
White	25	1.6%
African American	0	0%
American Indian	1493	95%
Asian	0	0%
Native Pacific Islander	1	<.1%
Some other race	28	1.8%
Two or more races	25	1.6%
Hispanic of any race	21	1.3%
Citizens of voting age	1172	75%
Total housing units	731	--

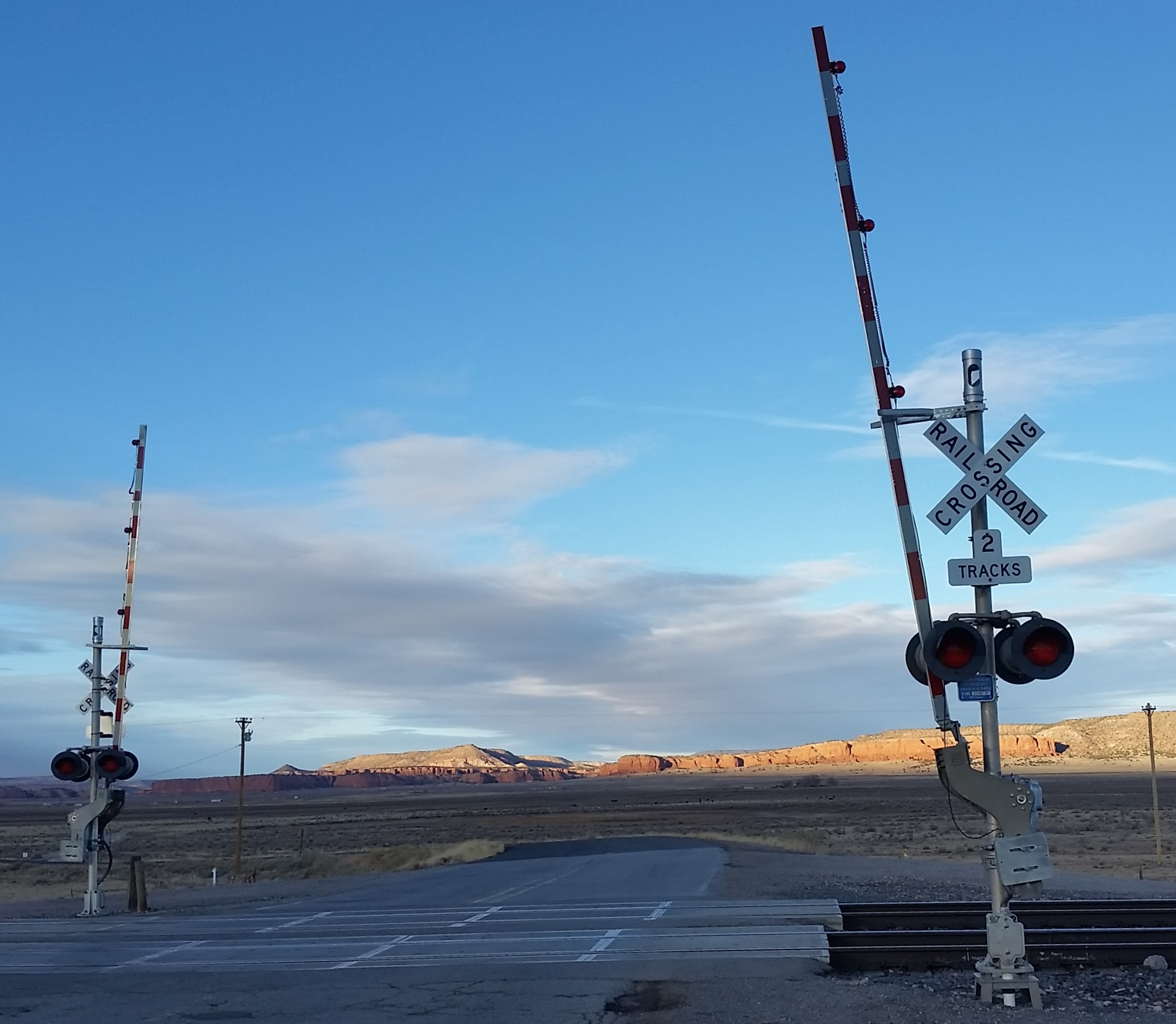
BNSF railway crossing on McKinley County Highway 19 in Prewitt, looking toward Prewitt's red cliffs and mesas.

== Education ==
Prewitt is the home of Baca /Dlo'Ay Azhi Community School run by the Bureau of Indian Education. Baca /Dlo'Ay Azhi Community School serves grades K-6. The Associated Deputy Director for this school is Navajo Schools in Window Rock, AZ and the Education Resource Center is Crownpoint.

It is in Gallup-McKinley County Public Schools. Zoned schools are Thoreau Elementary School, Thoreau Middle School, and Thoreau High School.

== Points of interest ==
- Bluewater Lake State Park
- Casamero Pueblo
- Trail of the Ancients Scenic Byway

== Notable people ==
- Paddy Martinez, prospector who discovered uranium at Haystack Mesa

== See also ==
- List of census-designated places in New Mexico
