= Tijeras, New Mexico =

- Village
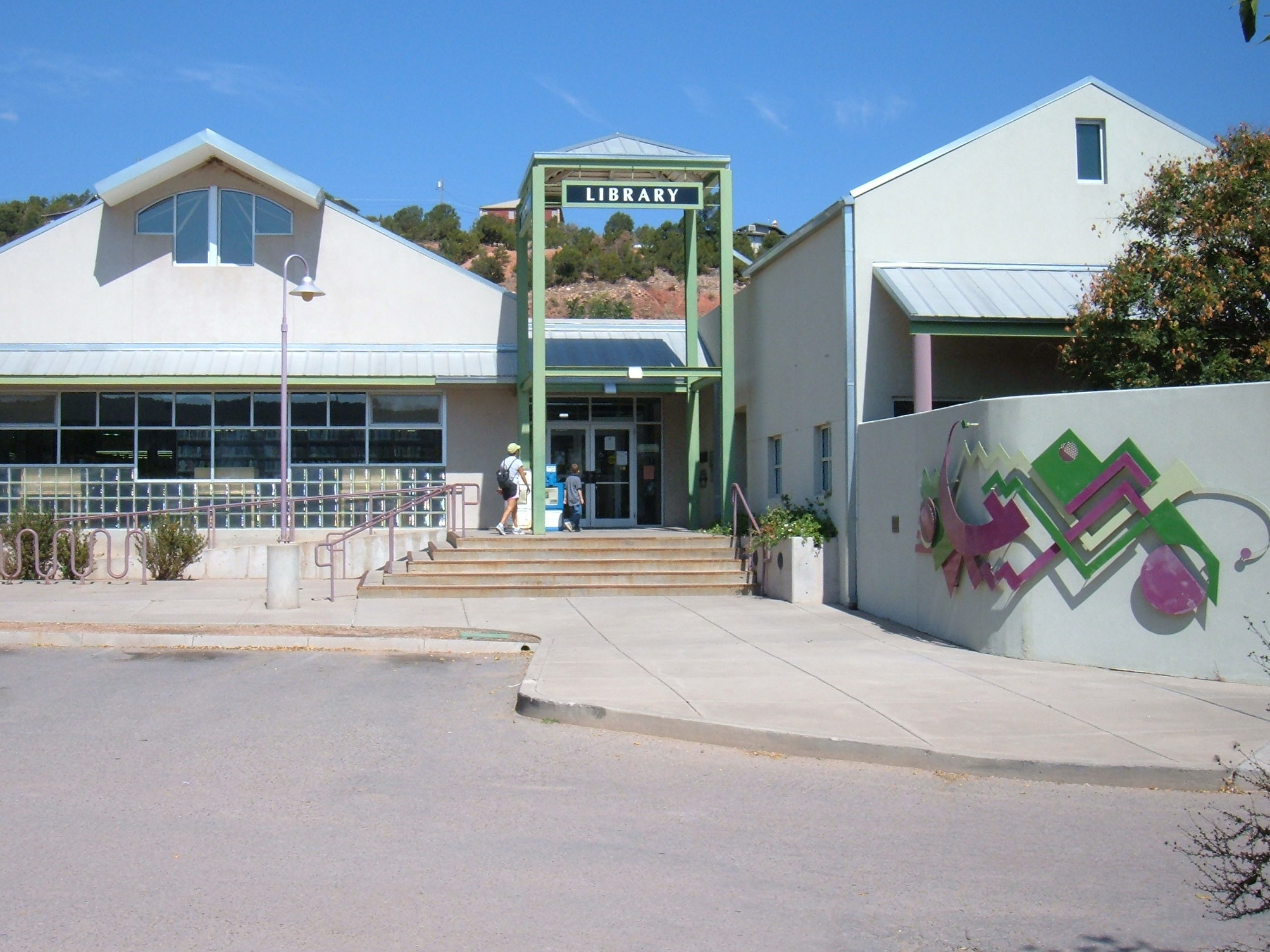
- East Mountain Library in Tijeras

- Location of Tijeras, New Mexico

- Location in the United States
- Coordinates: 35°05′42″N 106°22′12″W
- Country: United States
- State: New Mexico
- County: Bernalillo

Area
  - Total: 1.14 sq mi (2.95 km^{2})
  - Land: 1.13 sq mi (2.93 km^{2})
  - Water: 0.0039 sq mi (0.01 km^{2})
- Elevation: 6,382 ft (1,945 m)

Population (2020)
  - Total: 465
  - Density: 410.7/sq mi (158.59/km^{2})
- Time zone: UTC-7 (Mountain (MST))
  - Summer (DST): UTC-6 (MDT)
- ZIP code: 87059
- Area code: 505
- FIPS code: 35-77880
- GNIS feature ID: 2413593
- Website: www.tijerasnm.gov

Tijeras is a village in Bernalillo County, New Mexico, United States. The population was 465 at the 2020 census. It is part of the Albuquerque metropolitan area.

== Pre-Columbian ==
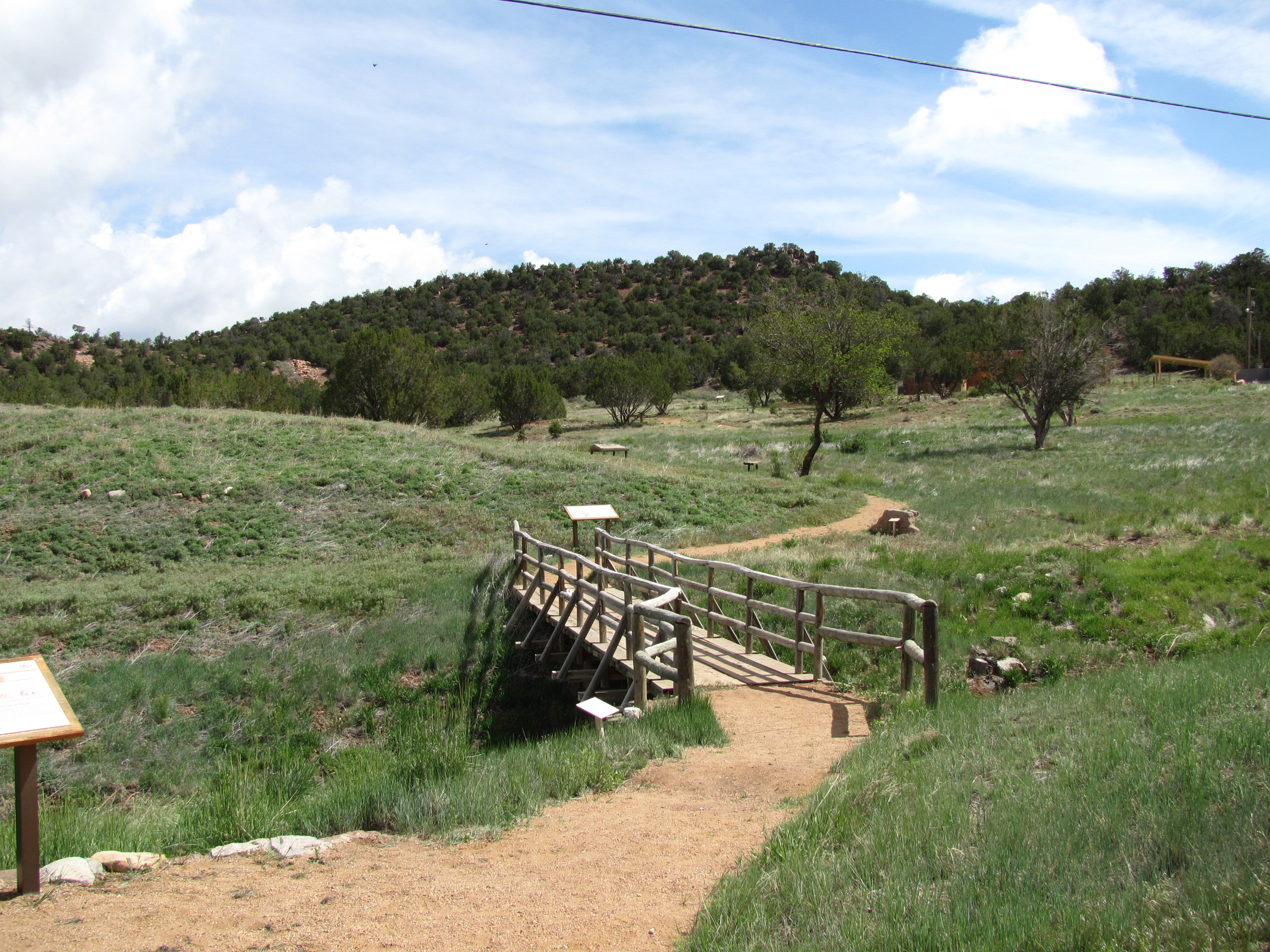
Tijeras Pueblo archeological site

The Tijeras Pueblo Archaeological Site is located in Tijeras at 35° 04′ 30″ N, 106° 23′ 01.″ The site was occupied by Ancestral Puebloans from about 1313 CE to 1425 CE. In the first phase of its occupation the Tijeras Pueblo had about 200 rooms in terraced buildings arranged in a "U" shape with a large ceremonial Kiva at the center. The pueblo was partially abandoned after about 1360 but rebuilding began about 1390, although the pueblo never regained its previous size. It was abandoned about 1425. The reasons for the abandonment of the pueblo are unknown, although it may have been because of drought and water shortages.

The Tijeras Pueblo Archaeological Site is open to visitors. A museum on the site is open weekends and a self-guiding trail winds through the ruins.

== History ==
Tijeras was part of the Carnuel land grant, created in 1763 to defend Albuquerque from the raids of Comanche, Kiowa, and Plains Apache American Indians. The village is located in Tijeras Canyon, a strategic and natural corridor between the nomadic Indians of the Great Plains and the Spanish settlements in the Rio Grande valley. Nineteen men some with families, comprised the first settlers at Carnuel. They were mostly from the lower castas of Spanish society, "coyotes" and genizaros (Indians who lived among the Spanish and had adopted some elements of Hispanic culture). For the coyotes and genizaros the attraction to settle in the Tijeras area was the opportunity to own land through the land grant from the New Mexican government.

Apache raiders killed several people in the area and the survivors abandoned the land grant area in 1771. The Mescalero Apache name for Tijeras canyon is Nakai'e Naagishuł or "Mexican they dragged". The Tijeras area was resettled in 1819 by descendants of the original settlers plus additional landless mestizos. By that time New Mexico had made peace with the Comanche and the threat to the eastern frontiers of the colony had decreased, making the settlement feasible. The genizaro heritage continued to influence land and water usage rights in the Carnuel land grant into the 21st century.

== Geography ==
=== Geography ===
Tijeras is located at 35°5′15″N 106°22′38″W (35.087550, -106.377354), in central New Mexico, approximately 25 kilometres (16 miles) east of Albuquerque, on Interstate 40 (Exit 175) and U.S. Highway 66 (Route 66)/New Mexico state highway 333. New Mexico State Road 14 leads north from the village, toward Cedar Crest, Sandia Crest, Madrid and Santa Fe. New Mexico State Road 337 leads south from Tijeras (see Google map).

=== Physical geography ===
Tijeras is at the junction of Tijeras Canyon, leading to the west, toward Albuquerque, and Cedro Canyon, leading to the south, toward the Manzano Mountains.

=== Land area ===
According to the United States Census Bureau, the village has a total area of 1.2 square miles (3.0 km^{2}), of which 0.008 square miles (0.02 km^{2}), or 0.56%, is water.

== Demographics ==
Historical population
Census	Pop.	Note	%±
1980	311		—
1990	340		9.3%
2000	474		39.4%
2010	541		14.1%
2020	465		−14.0%
U.S. Decennial Census

As of the census of 2000, there were 474 people, 191 households, and 131 families residing in the village. The population density was 559.5 inhabitants per square mile (216.0/km^{2}). There were 210 housing units at an average density of 247.9 per square mile (95.7/km^{2}). The racial makeup of the village was 65.82% White, 1.05% Native American, 0.21% Asian, 28.06% from other races, and 4.85% from two or more races. Hispanic or Latino people of any race were 56.33% of the population.

There were 191 households, out of which 33.5% had children under the age of 18 living with them, 52.9% were married couples living together, 10.5% had a female householder with no husband present, and 31.4% were non-families. 24.6% of all households were made up of individuals, and 9.4% had someone living alone who was 65 years of age or older. The average household size was 2.48 and the average family size was 3.02.

In the village, the population was spread out, with 26.8% under the age of 18, 7.2% from 18 to 24, 28.5% from 25 to 44, 27.2% from 45 to 64, and 10.3% who were 65 years of age or older. The median age was 39 years. For every 100 females, there were 107.0 males. For every 100 females age 18 and over, there were 111.6 males.

The median income for a household in the village was $34,167, and the median income for a family was $46,250. Males had a median income of $31,750 versus $25,179 for females. The per capita income for the village was $18,836. About 9.6% of families and 9.5% of the population were below the poverty line, including 5.4% of those under age 18 and 20.0% of those age 65 or over.

As of the census of 2011, there were 548 people living in Tijeras. By 2009, the estimated mean household income had risen to $49,441, slightly above that of the state as a whole ($43,028). The mean price of a housing unit in 2009 was $229,479, which was significantly higher than the mean home price in the state as a whole ($160,900).

== Education ==
It is zoned to Albuquerque Public Schools.

== Features ==
=== Musical highway ===
In October 2014, Tijeras gained national attention for a nearby "musical road", a two-lane stretch of former U.S. Highway 66 (Route 66) with grooves in the roadway (rumble strips) arranged to cause the sounds of a famous song ("America the Beautiful") to be heard when vehicles drive on it at 45 mph.
