= Bluewater Lake State Park =

State park in New Mexico, United States

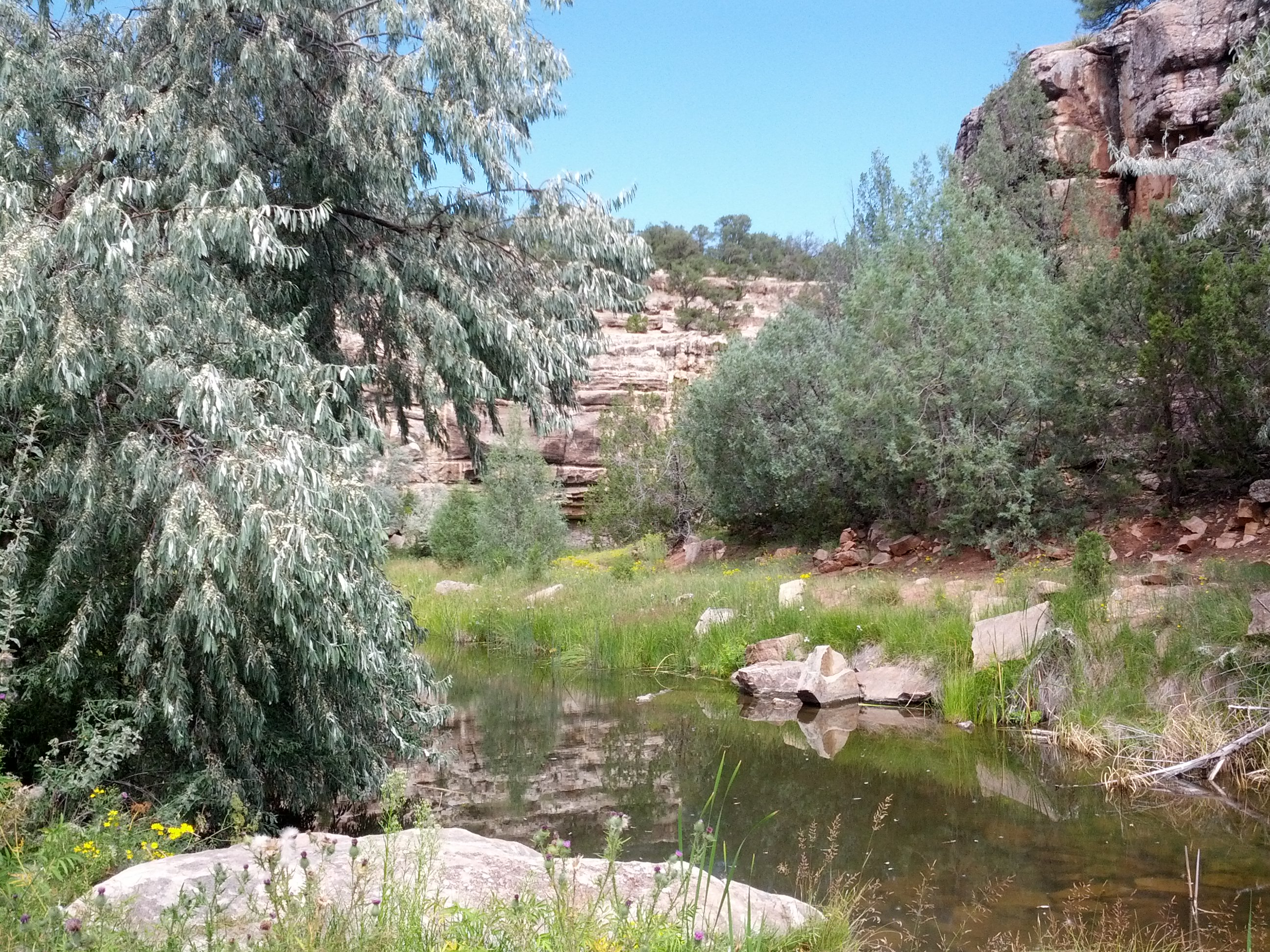
- Tree by Bluewater Creek

- Location within New Mexico
- Interactive map of Bluewater Lake State Park
- Location: Cibola County, New Mexico, United States
- Coordinates: 35°18′07″N 108°06′25″W
- Area: 3,000 acres (1,200 ha)
- Elevation: 7,554 ft (2,302 m)
- Established: 1955
- Administrator: New Mexico State Parks Division
- Website: Official website

Bluewater Lake State Park is a state park in Prewitt, New Mexico, United States, located in the Zuni Mountains 30 miles (48 km) west of Grants. The park encompasses approximately 3,000 acres (1,200 ha), and the lake has a surface area of approximately 1,200 acres (4.9 km^{2}).

The park is popular for fishing and bird watching, with 68 different species of birds either calling the park home, or passing through the park on their annual migrations. The lake is stocked with rainbow trout, cutthroat trout, tiger muskie and channel catfish. Its high altitude (7,400 ft) and location in northern New Mexico cause the lake to freeze over in the winter, allowing ice fishing to take place. While there are no designated equestrian trails, horseback riding is allowed throughout the park except within 10 feet of the lake.

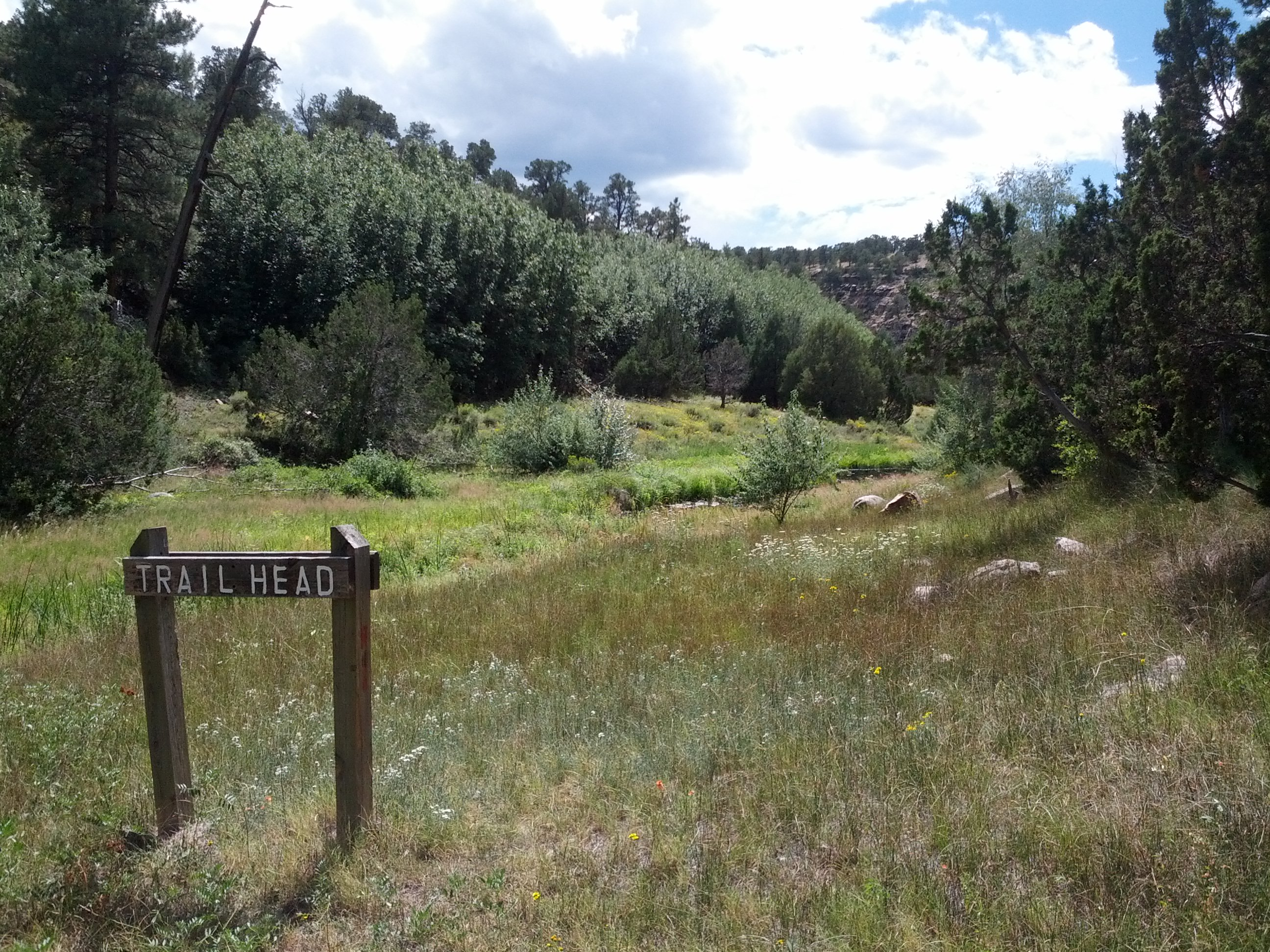
Trailhead

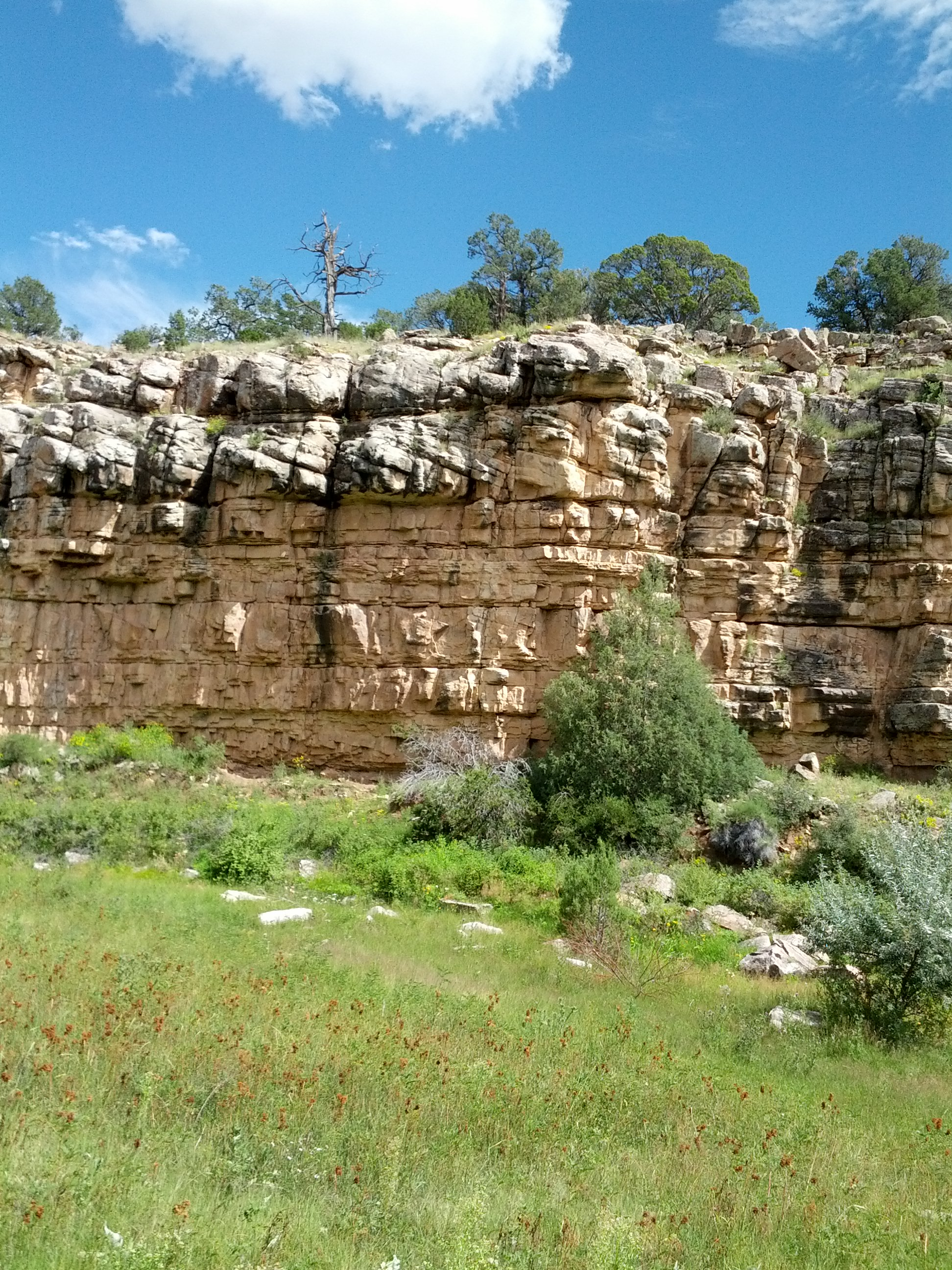
Cliffs along Bluewater Creek
