= Bluewater Village, New Mexico =

- Census-designated place
- Location within New Mexico
- Coordinates: 35°15′05″N 107°58′24″W
- Country: United States
- State: New Mexico
- County: Cibola

Area
  - Total: 3.56 sq mi (9.22 km^{2})
  - Land: 3.54 sq mi (9.18 km^{2})
  - Water: 0.012 sq mi (0.03 km^{2})
- Elevation: 6,628 ft (2,020 m)

Population (2020)
  - Total: 464
  - Density: 130.8/sq mi (50.52/km^{2})
- Time zone: UTC-7 (Mountain (MST))
  - Summer (DST): UTC-6 (MDT)
- ZIP code: 87005
- Area code: 505
- GNIS feature ID: 2584059

Bluewater Village is a census-designated place in Cibola County, New Mexico, United States. As of the 2020 census, Bluewater Village had a population of 464.

== Description ==
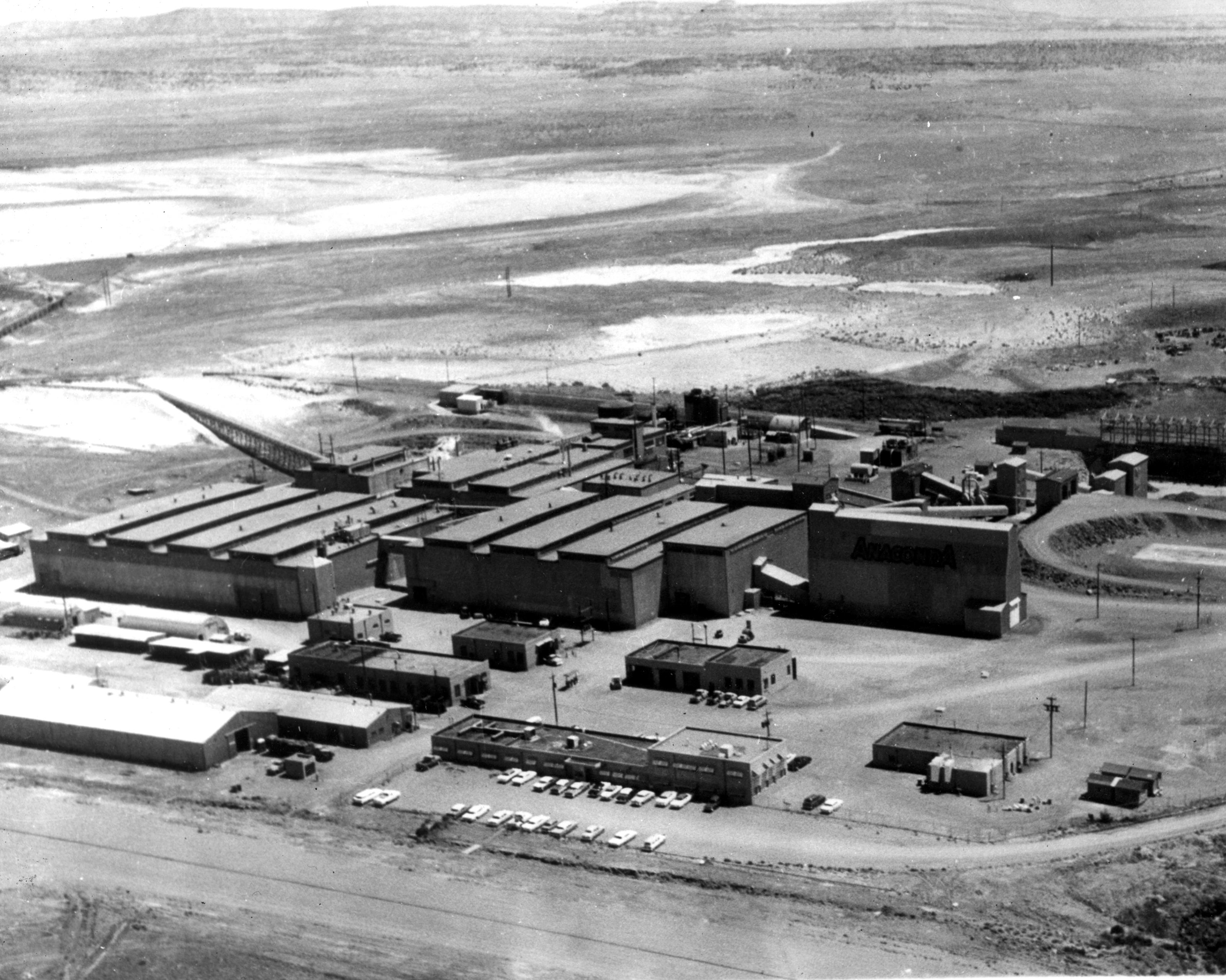
Anaconda Copper's Bluewater Mill, circa 1963

Bluewater Village is west of Grants. The Bluewater Elementary School is located here. The Bluewater post office, which is included in the CDP, has a ZIP code of 87005.

There was formerly a Navajo community at this location, and the area was called Agua Azul. The town was founded in 1880 as a stop on the A&P Railroad. Several Mormon settlers built an earthen dam and established a community nearby in 1896 named Mormontown. The railroad town faded, and Mormontown adopted the name Bluewater.

Nearby was the former Bluewater Mill, a uranium mill operated by Anaconda Copper from 1954 to 1982. The site was reclaimed in 1995, under the provisions of the Uranium Mill Tailings Radiation Control Act, and is monitored by the U.S. Department of Energy.

== Demographics ==
Historical population
Census	Pop.	Note	%±
2020	464		—
U.S. Decennial Census

== See also ==
- List of census-designated places in New Mexico
