= Trail of the Ancients Scenic Byway (New Mexico) =

Route in New Mexico with numerous archaeological and geological sites

Coordinates: 36°3′36″N 107°58′12″W

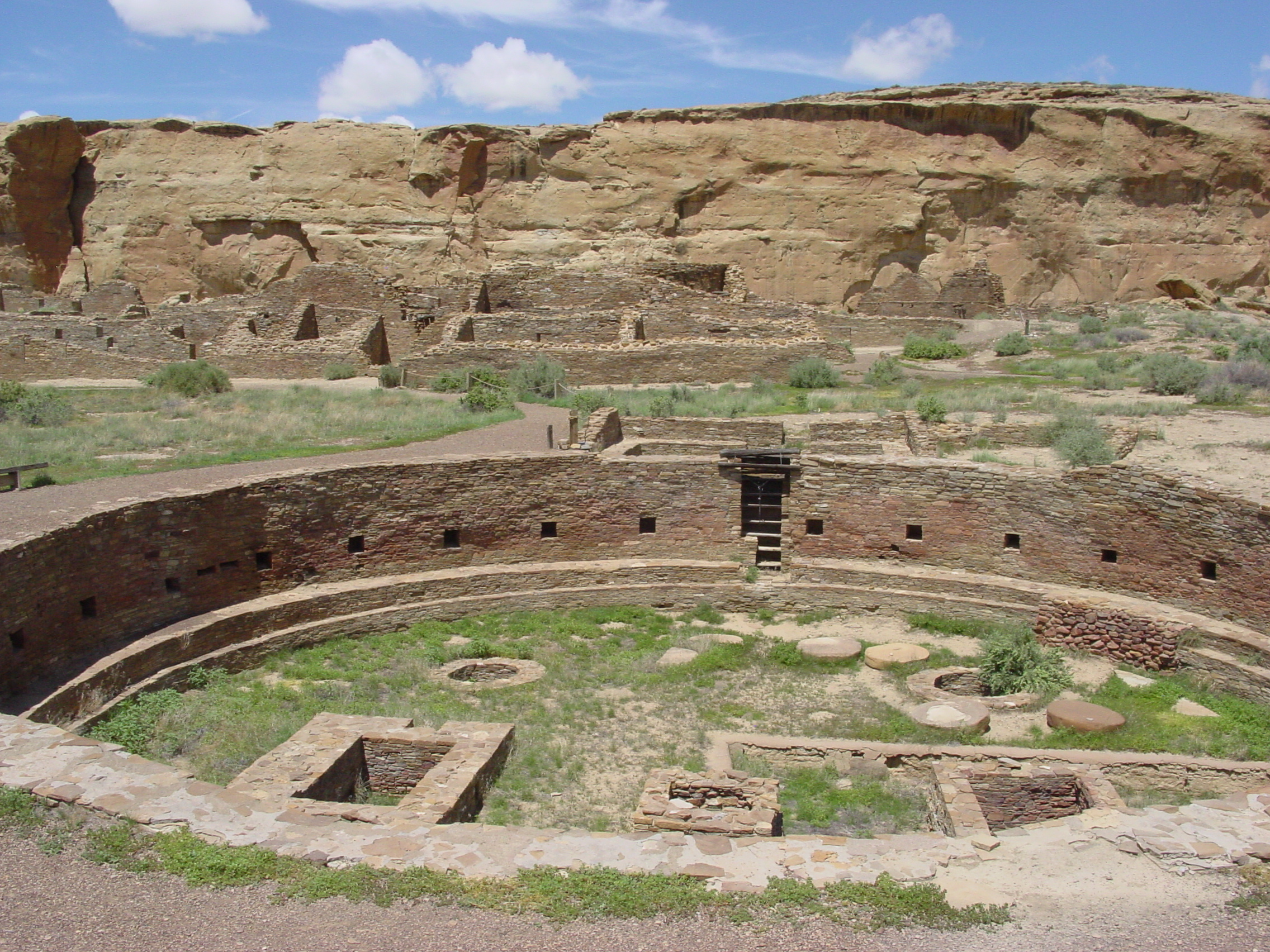
- Chaco Culture National Historical Park
- Interactive map of Trail of the Ancients Scenic Byway

The Trail of the Ancients is a New Mexico Scenic Byway to prehistoric archaeological and geological sites of northwestern New Mexico. It provides insight into the lives of the Ancestral Puebloans and the Navajo, Ute, and Apache peoples. Geological features include canyons, volcanic rock features, and sandstone buttes. Several of the sites are scenic and wilderness areas with recreational opportunities.

== Route description ==
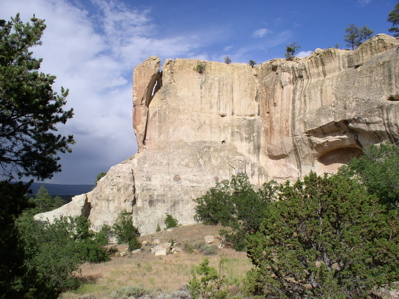
El Morro National Monument

The Trail of the Ancients captures the archaeological evidence of hunter and gatherers who lived in the area from 10,000 B.C. or earlier, in the northwestern portion of the state. The Ancient Puebloans that lived in the area between about 850 and 1250 A.D. are the ancestors of the modern Hopi, Zuni and Rio Grande Pueblo tribes. Navajos, from the Athabascan tribal areas in northwestern Canada, migrated into the area about 500 years ago. Other Native Americans include the Utes and Apaches.

Native peoples left evidence of their lives in ruins of agricultural communities, broken pieces of pottery, tools, pictographs, and petroglyphs. The landscape includes large sandstone formations, desolate deserts, interesting views, and geologic formations.

A key site on the byway are the ruins at Chaco Canyon, which was the "ceremonial center" for puebloan people at that and outlying pueblos between 850 and 1250 A.D. Other key sites are the El Morro National Monument and El Malpais National Monument.

A great portion of the land in northwestern New Mexico belongs to the Navajo Nation. The route traverses multiple roads, including U.S. Route 64, U.S. Route 550, NM 57, NM 122 and other state, county and Navajo Nation roads.

=== Chaco Culture National Historic Park ===
Chaco Culture National Historical Park, a UNESCO World Heritage Site that was inhabited in the canyon between 850 and 1250 A.D., is the center and starting point for the byway. It is located in a remote location on a rugged road. To reach the Chaco Culture site, follow National Park Service signs from U.S. Route 550, turning first onto County Road 7900. There are a visitor center, six monumental sites, and a trail to other sites.

=== Crownpoint ===
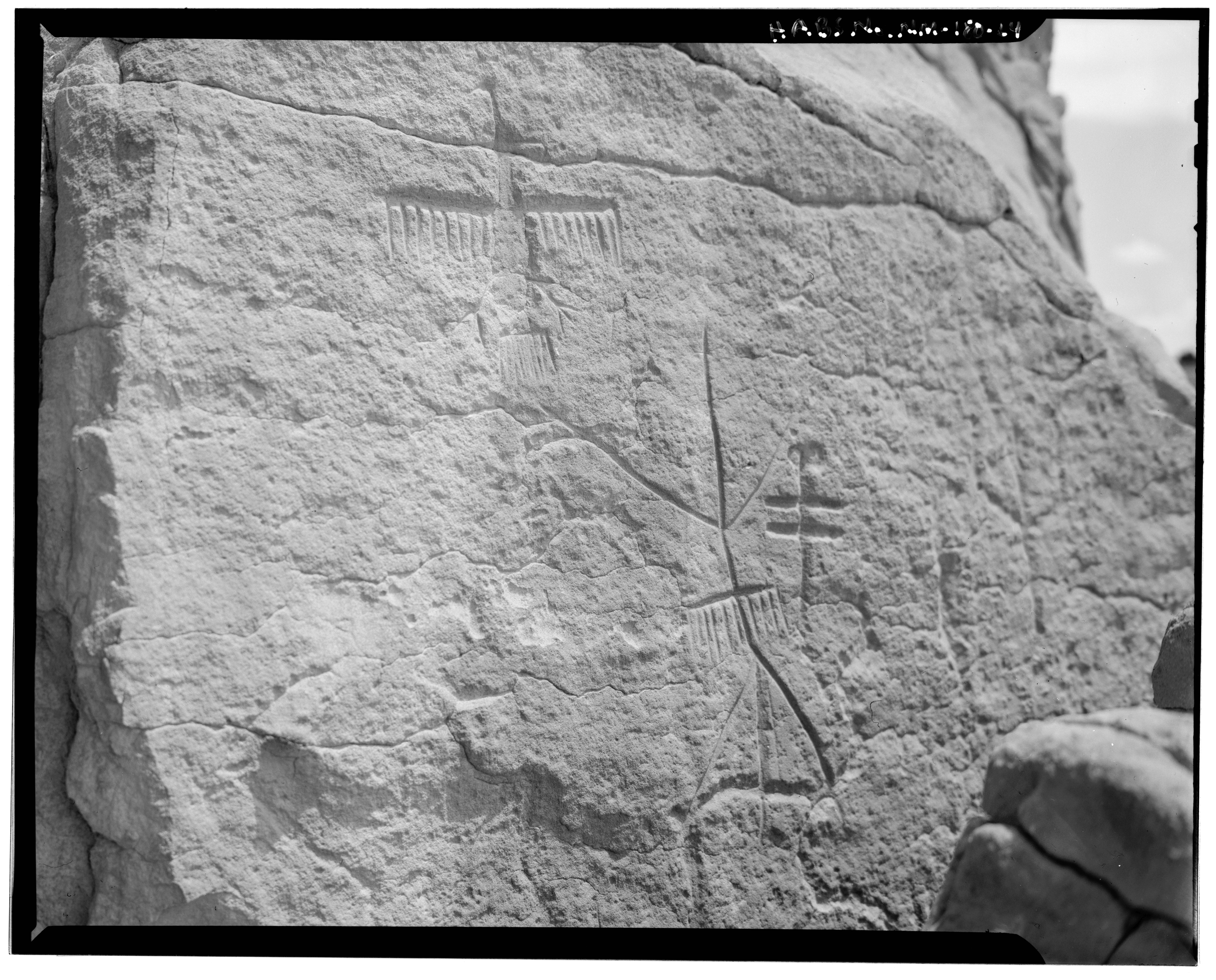
Thunderbird petroglyph at Crownpoint

On NM 57 drive south of the park to NM 371 and drive south to Crownpoint, known for its monthly auction of Navajo rugs.

=== Casamero Pueblo ===
Continue south on NM 371 to Navajo Road 48. Turn right on McKinley County Road 19 and continue on the road to the Casamero Pueblo, which was an outlier of the Chacoan site between about A.D. 1000 and 1125.

=== Grants volcanic sites ===
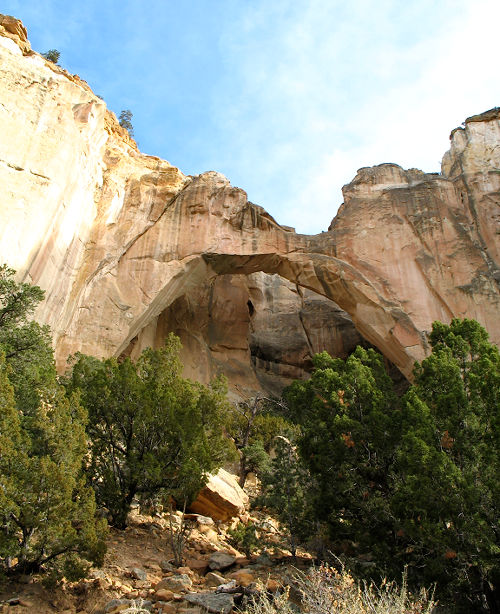
El Malpais National Monument

Travel south on McKinley County Road 19 to NM 122, turn left and travel the road to Grants, where there is the New Mexico Mining Museum. Continue on NM 122 to NM 117 and drive south to the El Malpais National Monument, made about 3,000 years ago by lava flows.

Return to Grants and from NM 122, take NM 53 south to the Ice Cave and Zuni-Bandera volcanic field, where there is the "Chain of Craters" of cinder cones.

=== El Morro ===
Drive west on NM 53 to El Morro National Monument, a large butte that appears "like a huge ocean liner" on the horizon.

=== Zuni Pueblo ===
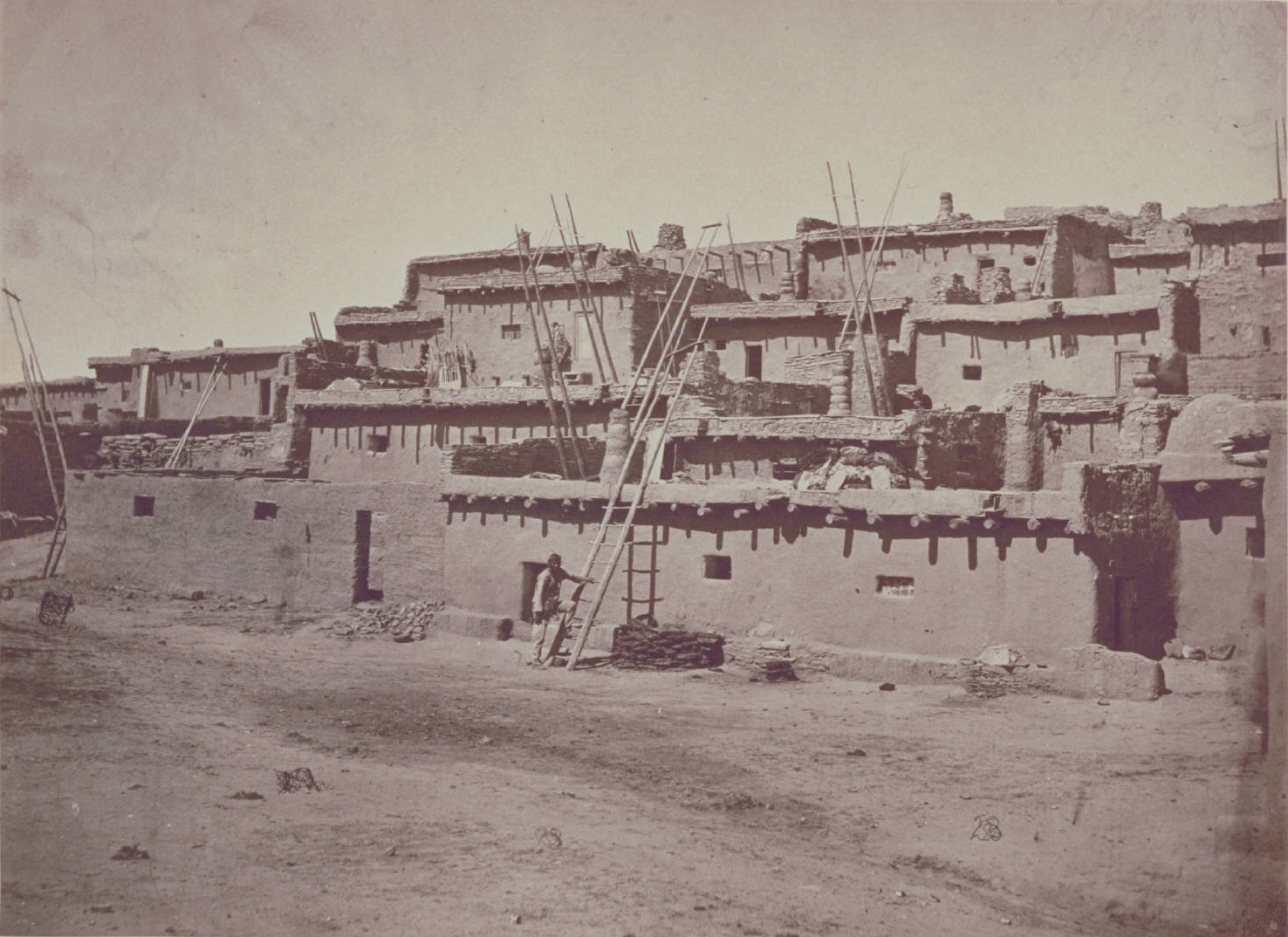
Zuni Pueblo

Continuing west on NM 53, the Zuni Pueblo with six original sites was the goal of Francisco Vázquez de Coronado in his search for the "Seven Cities of Gold."

=== Gallup ===
Gallup is located north on NM 602, where there is a mural to the Navajo Code Talkers of World War II, Indian crafts for sale, a Visitor Center, the Rex Mining Museum, and the historic El Rancho Hotel & Motel.

=== Trading posts ===
Two Grey Hills and Toadlena are two trading posts located north of Gallup in Newcomb on U.S. Route 491. There are about 1,500 Navajo people living near the trading posts, some of whom who sell their woven rugs at the trading posts.

=== Farmington ===
Farmington, where two thirds of the surface water in New Mexico flows through area rivers, is north on U.S. Route 64. Recreational trails and the Farmington Museum are key sites.

=== Aztec Ruins National Monument ===
Two pueblo ruins at the Aztec Ruins National Monument, an outlier of the Chacoan Canyon site, are near Bloomfield, which is east of Farmington off of U.S. 64.

=== Badlands recreation areas ===
South of Bloomfield off of NM 371, in the badlands of New Mexico, are the Bisti Wilderness Area, De-Na-Zin Wilderness Area, and Angel Peak Scenic Areas.

=== Beklabito ===
Beklabito (also spelled Beclabito), a Navajo community, is located west on U.S. 64. The scenery includes Navajo hogans, red sandstone formations and yellow and gray-striped hills.

== History ==
The Trail of the Ancients Scenic Byway was made one of the New Mexico Scenic Byways after July 31, 1998 and by 2013. It was designated a National Scenic Byway by the Federal Highway Administration on January 19, 2021.

== Gallery ==
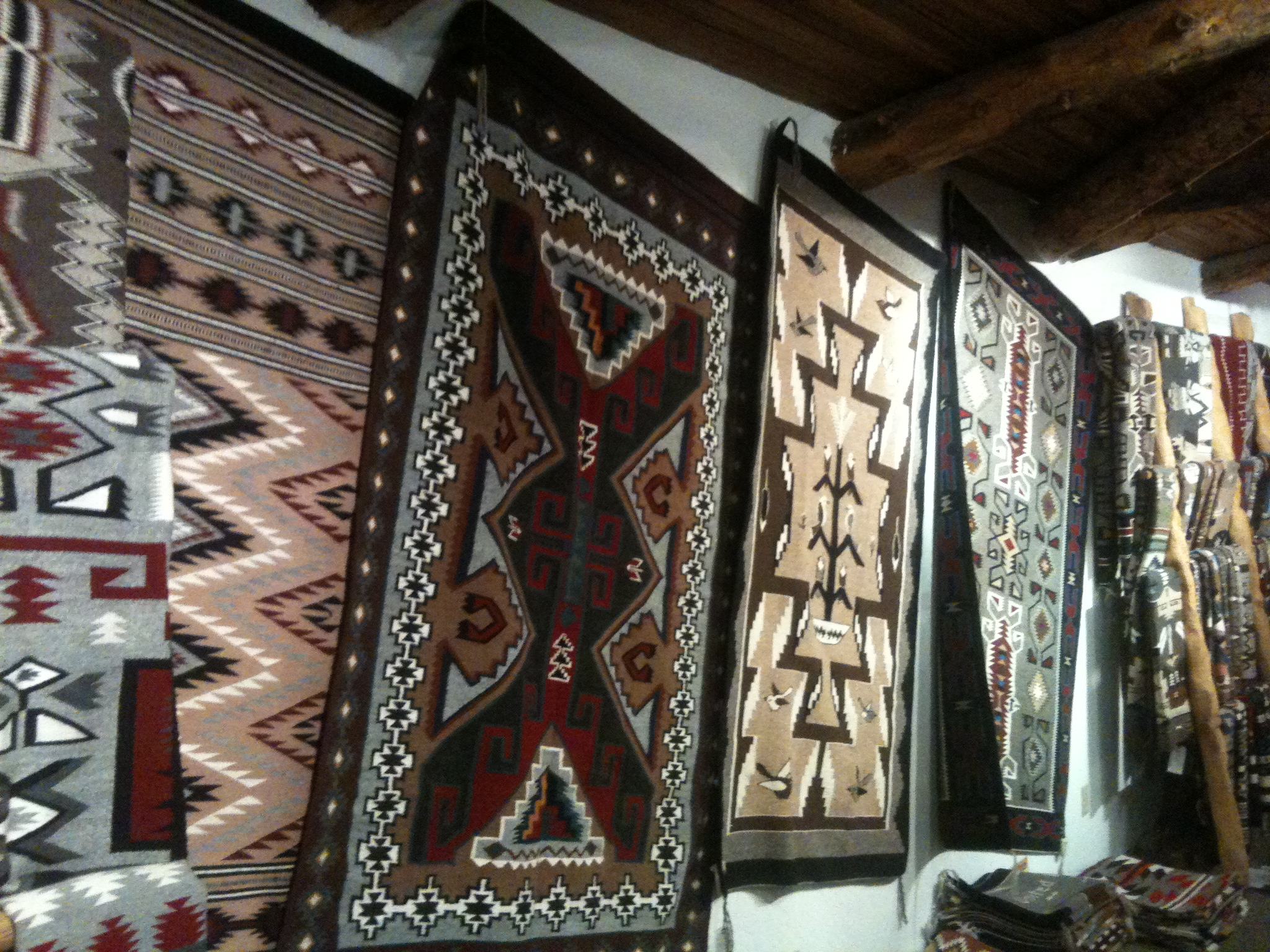
Examples of Navajo rugs

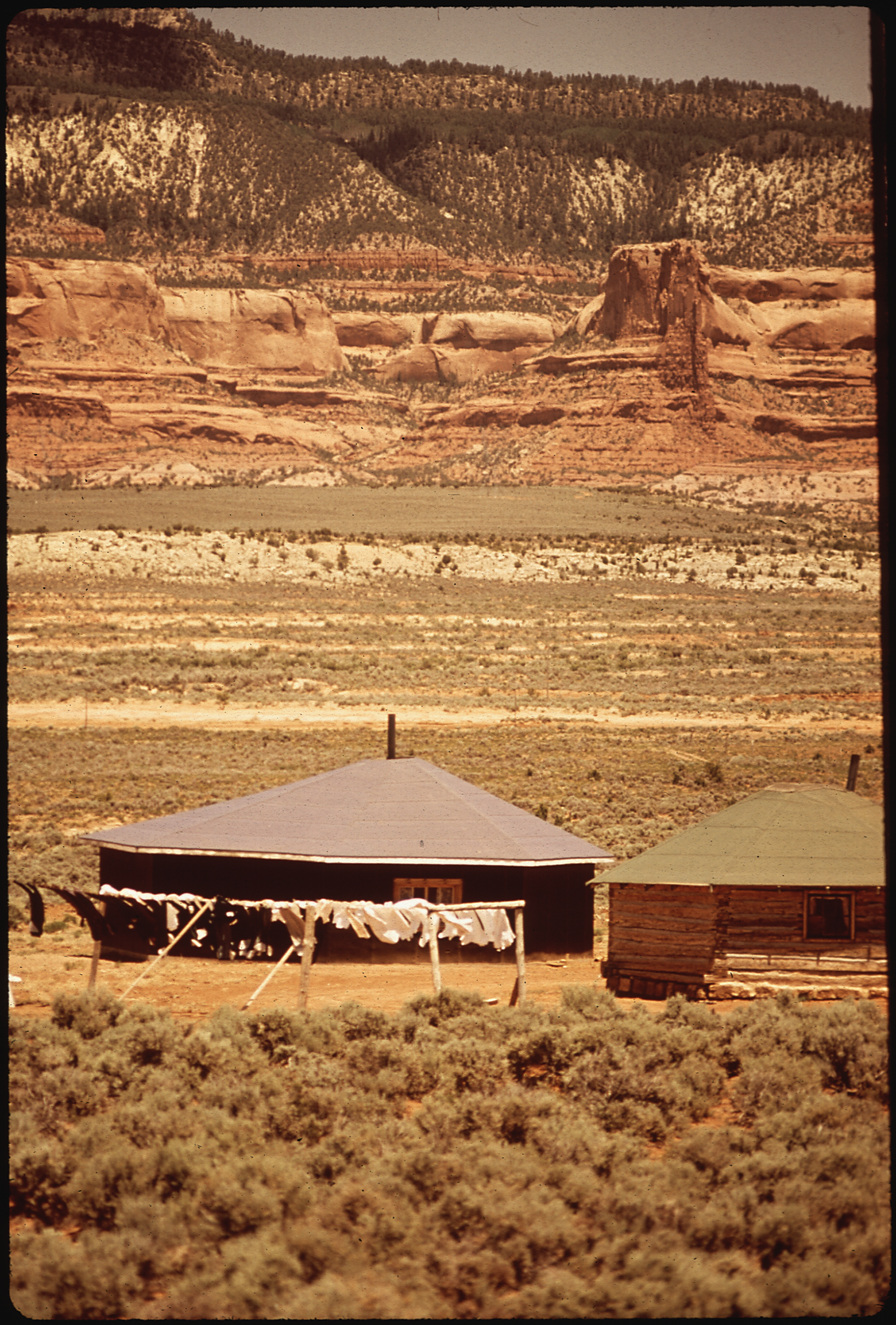
Examples of Navajo hogans

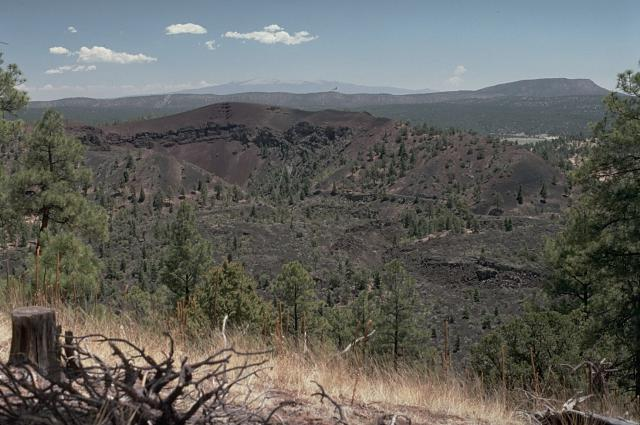
Bandera Volcano

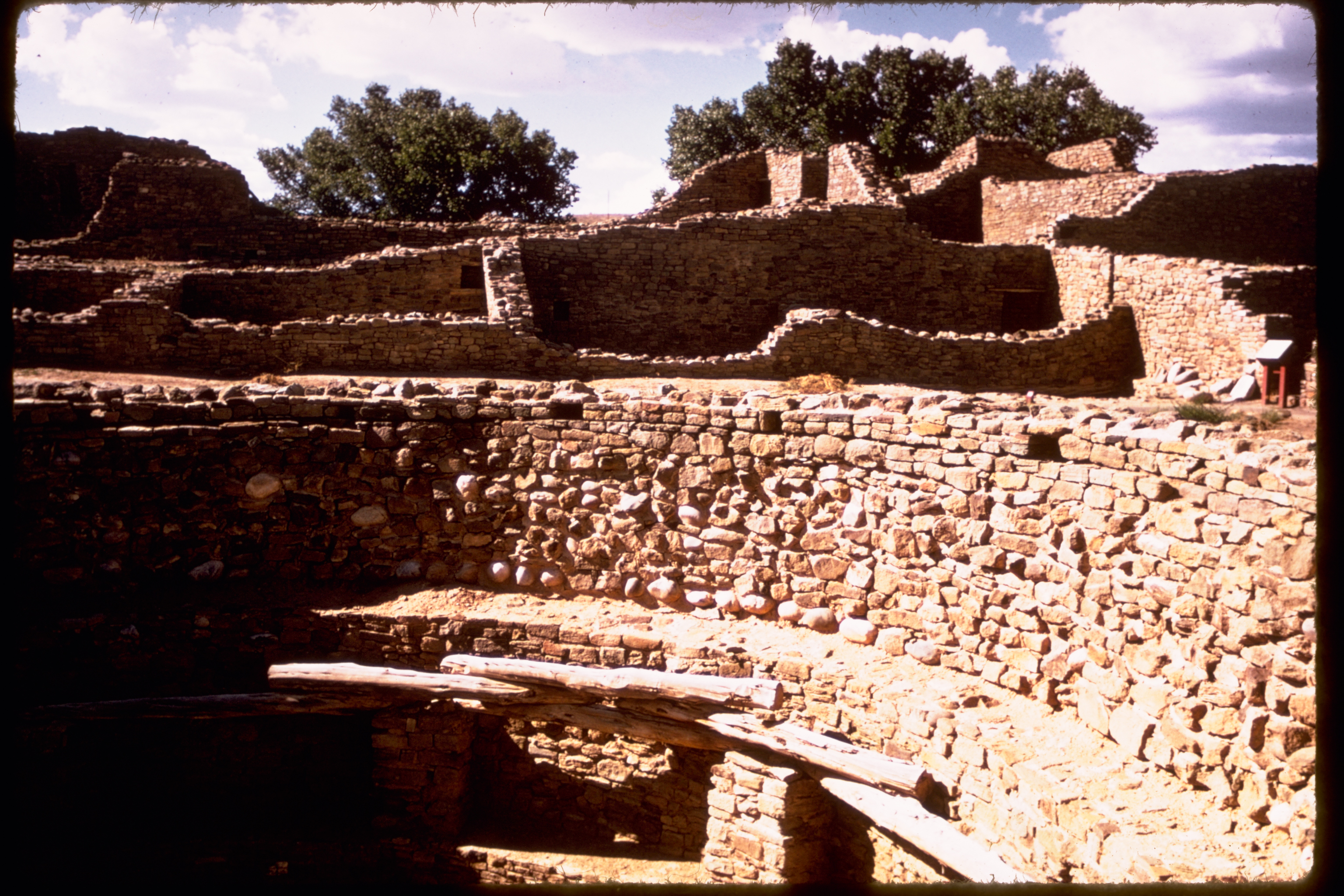
Aztec Ruins National Monument

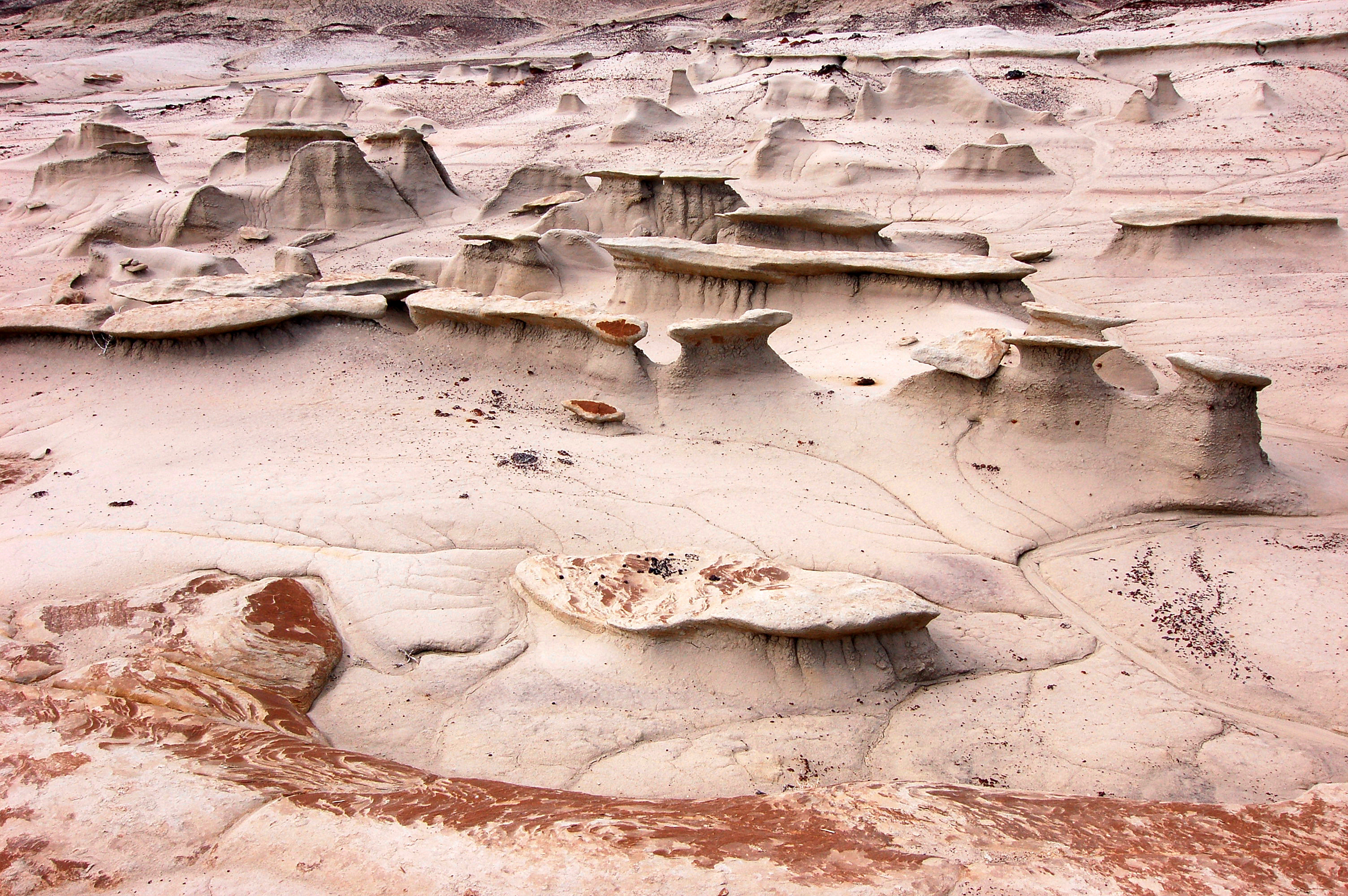
Bisti and De-Na-Zin Wilderness Areas

== See also ==
- Scenic byways in the United States
- Trail of the Ancients - Four Corners, Colorado and Utah
