= West Malpais Wilderness =

Wilderness area in New Mexico, United States

- IUCN category Ib (wilderness area)
- Location within the United States
- Location: Cibola County, New Mexico, United States
- Nearest city: Grants
- Coordinates: 34°53′24.6″N 108°09′30.4″W
- Area: 35,940 acres (145.4 km^{2})
- Established: 1987
- Governing body: United States Bureau of Land Management
- Website: West Malpais Wilderness

West Malpais Wilderness is a designated Wilderness Area managed by the U. S. Bureau of Land Management [BLM] located south of Grants, NM in Cibola County, New Mexico. Established in 1987, the 35,940-acre West Malpais Wilderness is located within the larger El Malpais National Conservation Area, a 231,230-acre BLM-managed area created in 1987 to protect the Grants Lava Flow, the Las Ventanas Chacoan Archeological Site, and other significant natural and cultural resources in Western New Mexico. One of two Wilderness Areas in the Conservation Area, the 35,940 acre West Malpais area is open to hiking, backpacking, horseback riding, and "Leave No Trace" primitive camping, and contains a short section of the Continental Divide National Scenic Trail.

== History and administration ==
The West Malpais Wilderness was created on December 31, 1987, with the passage of Public Law 100-225 by the 100th Congress. An important piece of public lands legislation, the law created not only the West Malpais Wilderness, but also created the 231,230 acre El Malpais National Conservation Area, the El Malpais National Monument, the Cebolla Wilderness, and the Masau Trail. In common with the larger Conservation Area and the nearby Cebolla Wilderness, West Malpais is administered by the Bureau of Land Management [BLM], and is managed as part of the BLM's Rio Puerco Field Office, located in Albuquerque, NM.

== Geography and climate ==
Mostly flat, and with elevations ranging from 7,000 to 7600 feet, the West Malpais Wilderness was shaped by countless volcanic eruptions, whose rivers of molten rock and flying cinders produced a landscape of craters, lava tubes, cinder cones, and pressure ridges. One of the most notable of these environmental elements is a 6,700-acre kipuka (a geological term describing an area of land surrounded by lava flows) in the northern half of the wilderness known as "Hole-In-The-Wall", where spreading waves of volcanic rock surround an island of ponderosa pine. A dry and hot environment known for high winds, the Wilderness sees high temperatures of 89 degrees Fahrenheit in July, average low temperatures in December around 20 degrees, and an average annual precipitation of 14 inches.

== Flora and fauna ==
Despite its volcanic origins and harsh climate, West Malpais contains many types of vegetation, as wind-deposited debris has thickened enough over the centuries to support many species of plant life. In the open southeastern portion of the wilderness, grasses and cacti dominate, while pinon and juniper can be found in the woodlands in the western areas and Ponderosa pine in the northern portion of the Wilderness. Common wildlife within the Wilderness includes antelopes, deer, rabbits, squirrels, coyotes, and red-tailed hawks. In the summer months a large colony of Mexican free-tailed bats migrates between the many caves that dot the lava fields.

== Location and access ==
Since the Wilderness shares much of its northern and eastern borders with the El Malpais National Monument, access to the area is along CR 42, which forms the southern and western borders of the Wilderness. A developed trail head, which leads into the Hole-in-the-Wall area, is located on CR 42 and can be accessed from the north via NM 53 SW of Grants, or from the east via NM 117 S of Grants. An unpaved road, CR 42 can be rendered difficult or impassible during times of wet weather and care should be taken to obtain current road conditions before visiting.

== Recreation ==
Like all Wilderness Areas, West Malpais is closed to all mechanized and motorized vehicles, including mountain bicycles. The Wilderness is open to hiking, backpacking, horseback riding, and "Leave-No-Trace" primitive camping. There are no permanent facilities in the Wilderness, and the only developed areas other than trail heads are the system of trails leading to the Hole-in-the-Wall area and the short section of the Continental Divide Trail that crosses the southern portion of the Wilderness. Trips into the Wilderness require a backcountry permit, which can be obtained from the El Malpais Information Center in Grants, or from the BLM Ranger Station on NM 117. As might be expected from a desert environment known as the "Badlands", the Wilderness has no water sources, so hikers and backpackers need to plan accordingly and be prepared to carry adequate supplies of water.

== Nearby attractions ==
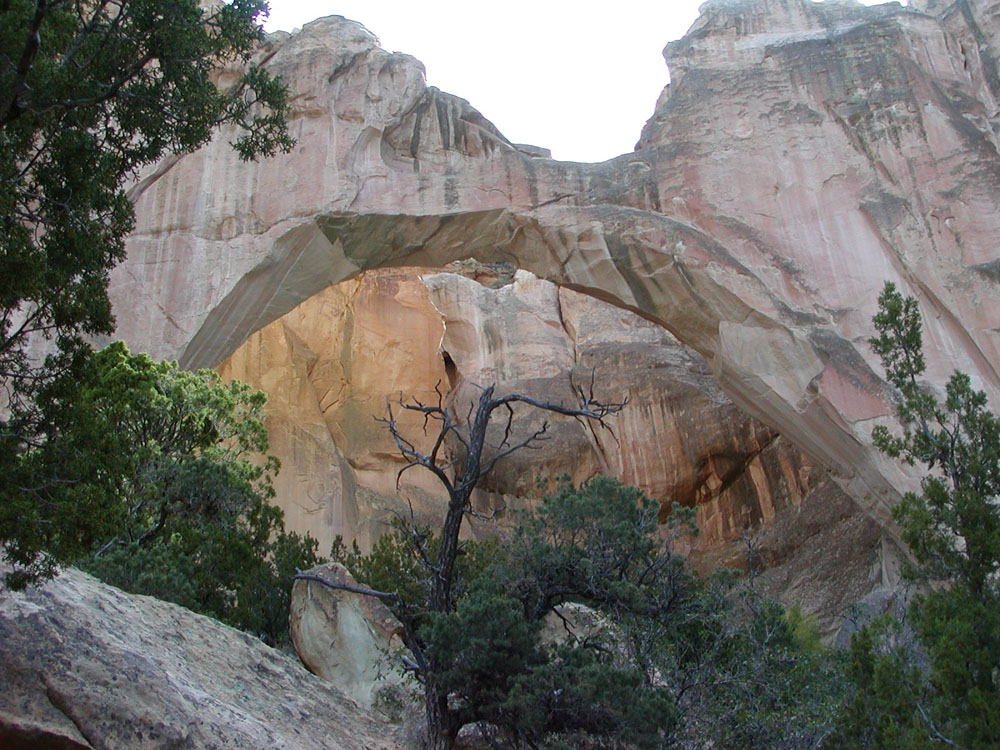
La Ventana Natural Arch, El Malpais N.C.A.

As previously noted, the West Malpais Wilderness is located within the 231,230 acre El Malpais National Conservation Area, a Bureau of Land Management area established at the same time as the Wilderness. The Conservation Area includes one primitive campground, several small picnic areas,

Immediately east of the Wilderness is El Malpais National Monument, a National Park Service-administered area created at the same time as the Conservation Area and the Wilderness. A fee-free area, the National Monument offers opportunities for hiking, scenic drives, and "Leave No Trace" primitive camping. Approximately 30 miles of the Continental Divide National Scenic Trail runs through the Monument and adjacent Conservation Area lands. El Malpais National Monument (U.S. National Park Service) The Monument can be reached via NM 53 just east of Grants, or by NM 117, from I-40, approximately 12 miles S of Grants. East and South of NM 117 lies the Conservation Area's other Wilderness Area, the 61,600-acre Cebolla Wilderness. An area of considerable archaeological interest, Cebolla is considerably easier to access than West Malpais Wilderness, and contains several developed trails and a number of developed trail heads along NM 117. Like West Malpais, Cebolla is open to hiking, backpacking, horseback riding, and "Leave No Trace" primitive camping. West of the Wilderness, along NM 53 is El Morro National Monument, a National Park Service-administered area... Another fee-free park, El Morro has a small developed campground, a rarity in the area. A year-round, first-come, first-served campground, the 9-site area offers vaulted-toilets and seasonal water.

== See also ==
- El Malpais National Conservation Area
- El Malpais National Monument
- Cebolla Wilderness
