= New Mexico State Road 601 =

State highway in New Mexico, United States

State Road 601
- NM 601 highlighted in red

Route information
- Maintained by NMDOT
- Length: 27.900 mi (44.901 km)

Major junctions
- South end: US 60 near Quemado
- North end: CR 35A to NM 36 at the Catron/ Cibola County line

Location
- Country: United States
- State: New Mexico
- Counties: Catron

Highway system
- New Mexico State Highway System; Interstate; US; State; Scenic
← NM 599	→ NM 602

State Road 601 (NM 601) is a 27.9-mile-long (44.9 km) state highway in the US state of New Mexico. NM 601's southern terminus is at U.S. Route 60 (US 60) west of Quemado, and the northern terminus is a continuation as Cibola County Route 35A (CR 35A) at the Catron–Cibola county line. CR 35A continues north to NM 36.

== History ==
The portion from the Cibola County line north to NM 36 maintenance was transferred to Cibola County on July 11, 1989 in a road exchange agreement.

== Major intersections ==
The entire route is in Catron County.

Location	mi	km	Destinations	Notes
	0.000	0.000	US 60	Southern terminus
	27.900	44.901	CR 35A to NM 36	Continues north as CR 35A at the Catron/ Cibola County line
1.000 mi = 1.609 km; 1.000 km = 0.621 mi
