= New Mexico State Road 599 =

State highway in Santa Fe County, New Mexico, United States

State Road 599
- Veterans Memorial Highway; Santa Fe Relief Route
- NM 599 highlighted in red

Route information
- Maintained by NMDOT
- Length: 14.019 mi (22.561 km)

Major junctions
- South end: NM 14 southwest of Santa Fe
- I-25 on border of La Cienega; CR 56 east of Santa Fe
- North end: US 84 / US 285 in Santa Fe

Location
- Country: United States
- State: New Mexico
- Counties: Santa Fe

Highway system
- New Mexico State Highway System; Interstate; US; State; Scenic
← NM 598	→ NM 601

New Mexico Road 599 (NM 599) is a 14.019-mile (22.561 km) state highway in northern Santa Fe County, New Mexico, United States. The divided highway expressway is also known as the Veterans Memorial Highway and the Santa Fe Relief Route; and both names are used on road signs. The latter name alludes to the highway's original purpose of bypassing the urbanized areas of Santa Fe and thereby relieving it from shipments of hazardous waste. It passes through less densely developed terrain in and around the northwestern boundary of the municipality. Speed limits on it range from 45 to 65 miles per hour (70 to 105 km/h).

== Route description ==
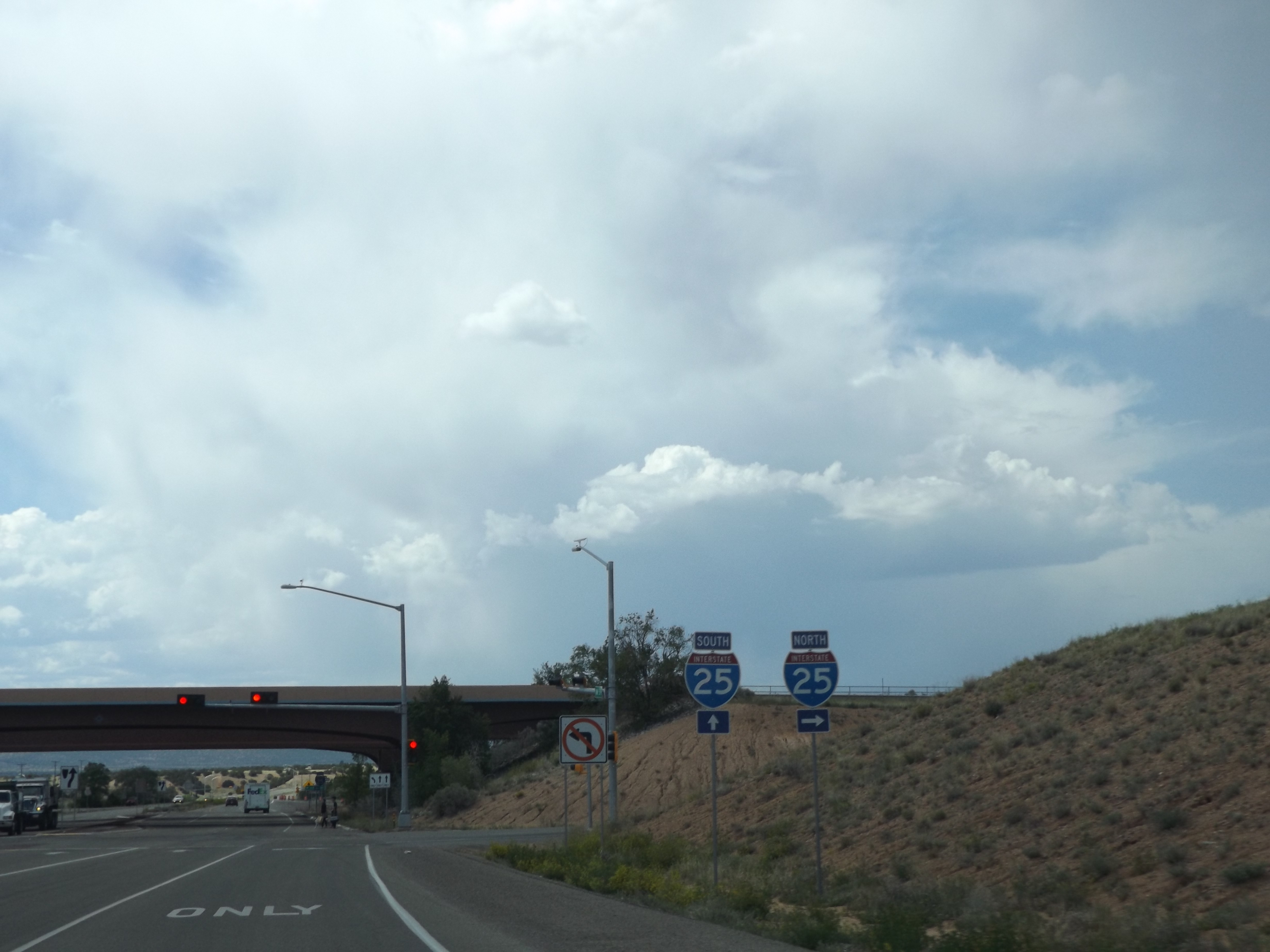
Northbound NM 599 approaching its diamond interchange with Interstate 25 in unincorporated Santa Fe County, June 2015

NM 599 begins at a traffic light–controlled intersection with Cerrillos Road (State Road 14 [NM 14]), about two miles (3.2 km) south of the eastern municipal boundaries of Santa Fe. (From the intersection the road heads east as Aveneda del Sur. NM 14 heads north as a divided highway to a diamond interchange with Interstate 25/U.S. Route 85 [I-25/US 85] and then on to Santa Fe. NM 14 heads south [initially as a divided highway] through Madrid and several other smaller communities to eventually end at Interstate 40.)

From its southern terminus NM 599 heads very briefly west to East I-25 Frontage Road before turning northwest. (East I-25 Frontage Road heads north toward the Santa Fe County/NM 599 RailRunner station.) The speed limit increases to 45 mph (70 km/h) as the expressway continues through its diamond interchange with I-25/US 85, where it passes under the freeway. North of the freeway, NM 599 briefly enters La Cienega, a census-designated place, and crosses West I-25 Frontage Road, which provides access to a horse racetrack (formerly known as Downs at Santa Fe). Northwest of the frontage road, the speed limit increases from 45 to 65 mph (70 to 105 km/h) for approximately two miles (3.2 km), as the expressway turns to the north and leaves La Cienega.

Next along the NM 599 is a diamond interchange with Jaguar Drive (Exit 2), that is located directly east of the Santa Fe Municipal Airport. (This interchange was added in 2015, years after the construction of the original highway, and, while it is directly east of the airport, the roadway does not yet continue west beyond the interchange.) Continuing north, and to the west of some of the Santa Fe's newer neighborhoods, the highway returns to a 45-mile-per-hour (72 km/h) speed limit before it approaches the remaining traffic light controlled intersection on the route at Airport Road (formerly State Route 284, now Santa Fe County Road 56). The Santa Fe Municipal Airport is accessed by heading west on Airport Road.

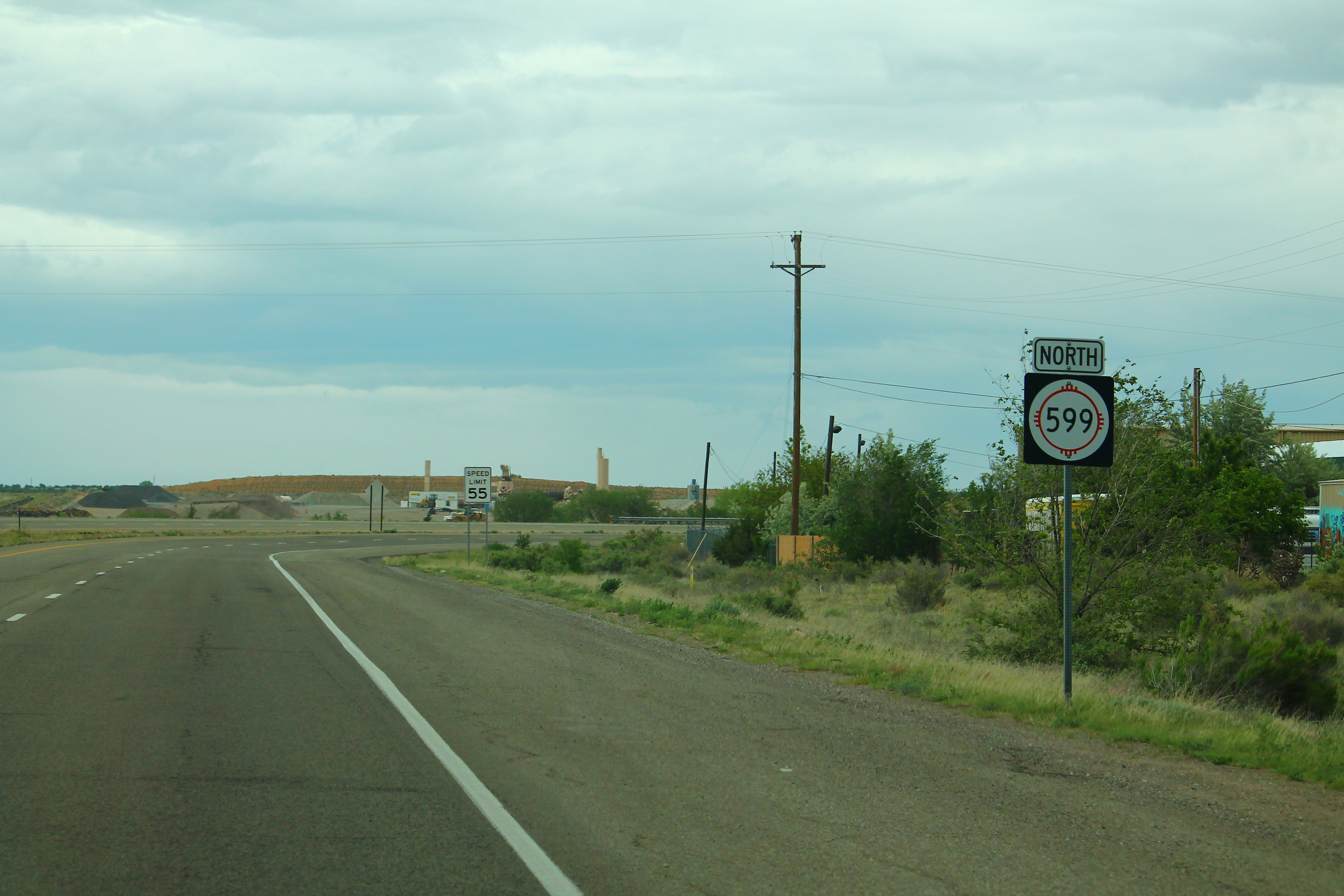
Northbound NM 599, just north of its intersection with Airport Road in unincorporated Santa Fe County, May 2017

As the highway leaves the industrial and residential area near the intersection with Airport Road, the speed limit increases to 55 mph (90 km/h) as the expressway curves to the northeast and crosses the Santa Fe River. Northeast of the river NM 599 gains a western frontage road. Continuing northeast the expressway begins a long moderate climb through rolling terrain with grasses and juniper shrubs punctuated by mostly light residential development, as the road follows (at a distance) Santa Fe's northwestern boundary, until it reaches a dumbbell interchange (Exit 6) with South Meadows Drive (CR 62). While South Meadow drive does not yet continue northwest beyond the interchange, it provides a connection with CR 62, which originally crossed NM 599, just northeast of the newer interchange. Continuing its northeasterly course, and its climb through rolling hills, the expressway reaches an intersection with Via Veteranos. (Northwest of this junction, the West Frontage Road was built to allow for this intersection to eventually be replaced by a diamond interchange.) Still further northeast along the route is the diamond interchange (unnumbered exit) with Camino La Tierra (north) and Paseo Nopal (south). The West Frontage Road ends at Camino La Tierra.

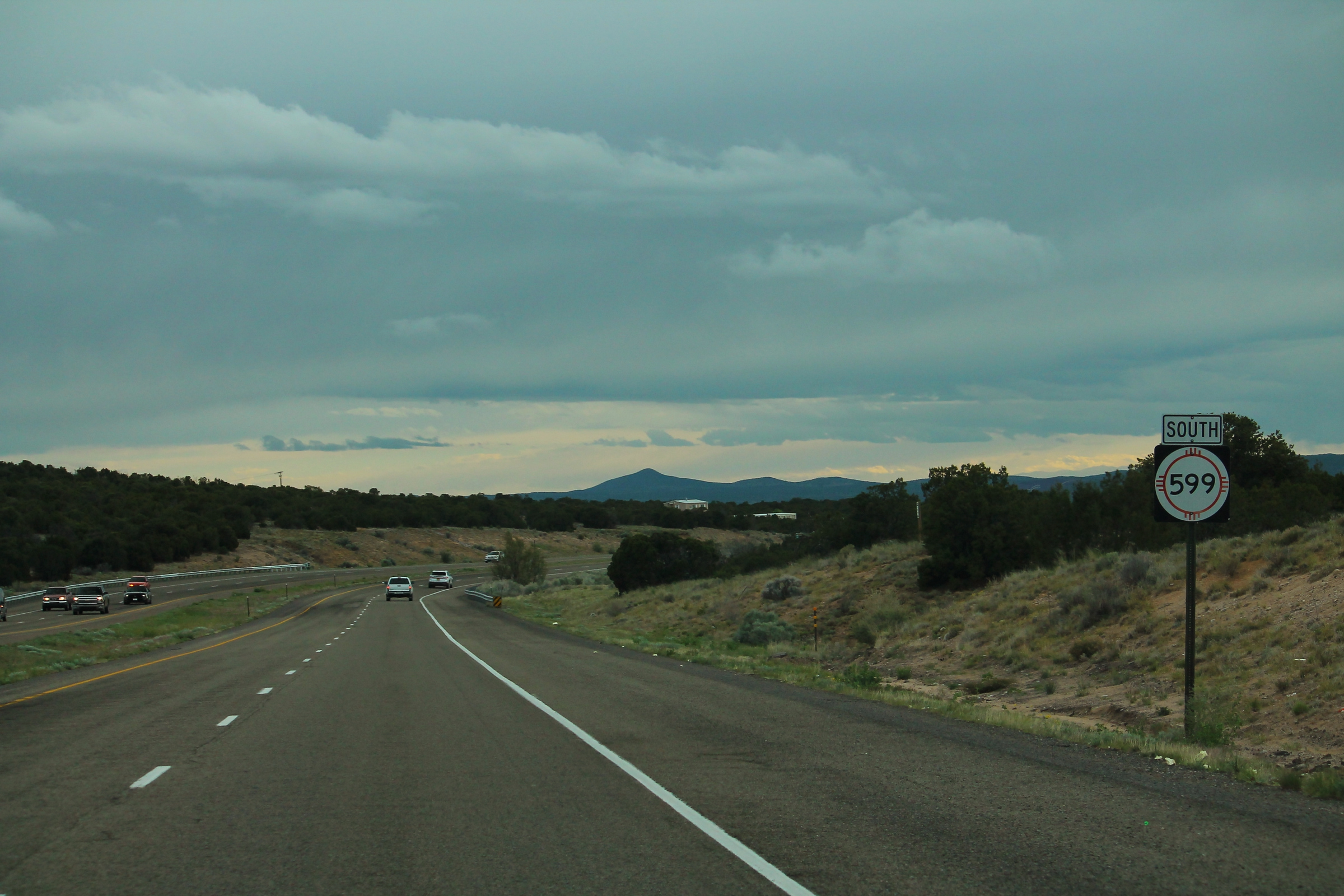
Southbound NM 599 at Miranda Road in Santa Fe, May 2017

Beyond the Camino La Tierra/Paseo Nopal interchange, the expressway assumes a more east–northeasterly course, re-enters the city limits of Santa Fe, and passes through largely open space (that is projected to be developed). About one mile (1.6 km) along this section is a T intersection with Miranda Road, which only connects with the southbound lanes of NM 599. After an intersection with Camino De Las Montoyas the route turns to the south–southeast and reaches its highest point at a diamond interchange (unnumbered exit) with Ridgetop Road. At 7,265 feet (2,214 m), this interchange is almost 1,000 feet (300 m) higher than the route's junction with I-25/US 85, approximately 12 miles (19 km) to the southwest. As the expressway crosses under Ridgetop Road the speed limit decreases to 45 mph (70 km/h) and the highway descends promptly into a canyon named Cañada Rincon. Less than a mile later, after turning to the southeast, NM 599 reaches its northern terminus at a trumpet interchange with the U.S. Route 84/U.S. Route 285 (US 84/US 285) freeway, which is part of the Camino Real de Tierra Adentro. (US 84/US 285 heads north out of Santa Fe to Pojoaque and Española and heads south to connect with I-25/US 85, immediately south of the Santa Fe city limits.)

== Design ==
Functionally, NM 599 is an expressway by being a divided highway with no driveway access. Instead, local access is provided by linked frontage roads or by way of other connecting roads. There are four diamond interchanges and a dumbbell interchange along the route, as well as a trumpet interchange at its northern terminus. (The diamond interchange with I-25/US 85 was originally constructed as a partial cloverleaf interchange, but was rebuilt as a diamond interchange in 2009 as part of the construction of the Santa Fe County/NM 599 RailRunner station in the median of I-25/US 85.) A few of the local highways that cross it at intervals are controlled by stop signs (but none on NM 599 itself) or traffic lights near the southern end of the route. Upgrades to the expressway are a consideration being undertaken by the New Mexico Department of Transportation's NM 599 Corridor Study.

== History ==
The NM 599 is significant as part of the road network traversed by vehicles transporting radioactive waste from Los Alamos National Laboratory (LANL) north of Santa Fe to the Waste Isolation Pilot Project (WIPP) in southern New Mexico (near Carlsbad). Much of the funding for construction of the route was supplied by the United States Department of Energy so that WIPP-bound waste from LANL would not have to pass through the center of Santa Fe. However, most of the traffic on the road is general public use and has nothing to do with WIPP waste, which is moved only at infrequent intervals in special convoys. Construction of the expressway took place over a period of several years in the 1990s and was completed in November 2000.

== Major intersections ==
The entire route is in Santa Fe County.

Location	mi	km	Exit	Destinations	Notes
	0.000	0.000		Avenida del Sur east	Road east beyond southern terminus
	0.000	0.000		NM 14	At-grade intersection; southern terminus
La Cienega	0.449– 0.765	0.723– 1.231		I-25 (US 85) – Albuquerque, Santa Fe	Diamond interchange; I-25 exit 276
Santa Fe			2	Jaguar Drive	Diamond interchange; opened to traffic on November 18, 2015
	3.581	5.763		CR 56 west (Airport Road) – Santa Fe Regional Airport, La Cieneguilla; Airport Road east (former NM 284) – Santa Fe	At-grade intersection
			Bridge over the Santa Fe River		
	6.300	10.139	6	CR 62 (South Meadows Road)	Dumbbell interchange
	8.130	13.084		CR 70 (West Alameda Street)	
	9.978– 10.230	16.058– 16.464		Camino La Tierra / Calle Nopal – Las Campanas	Diamond interchange; unnumbered exit
Santa Fe	11.670	18.781		CR 85 (Camino de los Montoyas)	At-grade intersection
Santa Fe	12.580	20.246		Ridgetop Road	Diamond interchange; unnumbered exit
Santa Fe	13.040– 14.019	20.986– 22.561		US 84 / US 285 – Española, Santa Fe	Northern terminus; Trumpet interchange; US 84/US 285 exit 166
1.000 mi = 1.609 km; 1.000 km = 0.621 mi: Closed/former

== See also ==
- List of state roads in New Mexico
