= New Mexico State Road 603 =

State highway in New Mexico, United States

State Road 603
- NM 603 highlighted in red

Route information
- Maintained by NMDOT
- Length: 22.666 mi (36.477 km)

Major junctions
- South end: US 60 in Pie Town
- North end: NM 36 near Quemado

Location
- Country: United States
- State: New Mexico
- Counties: Catron

Highway system
- New Mexico State Highway System; Interstate; US; State; Scenic
| ← NM 602 | → NM 605 |

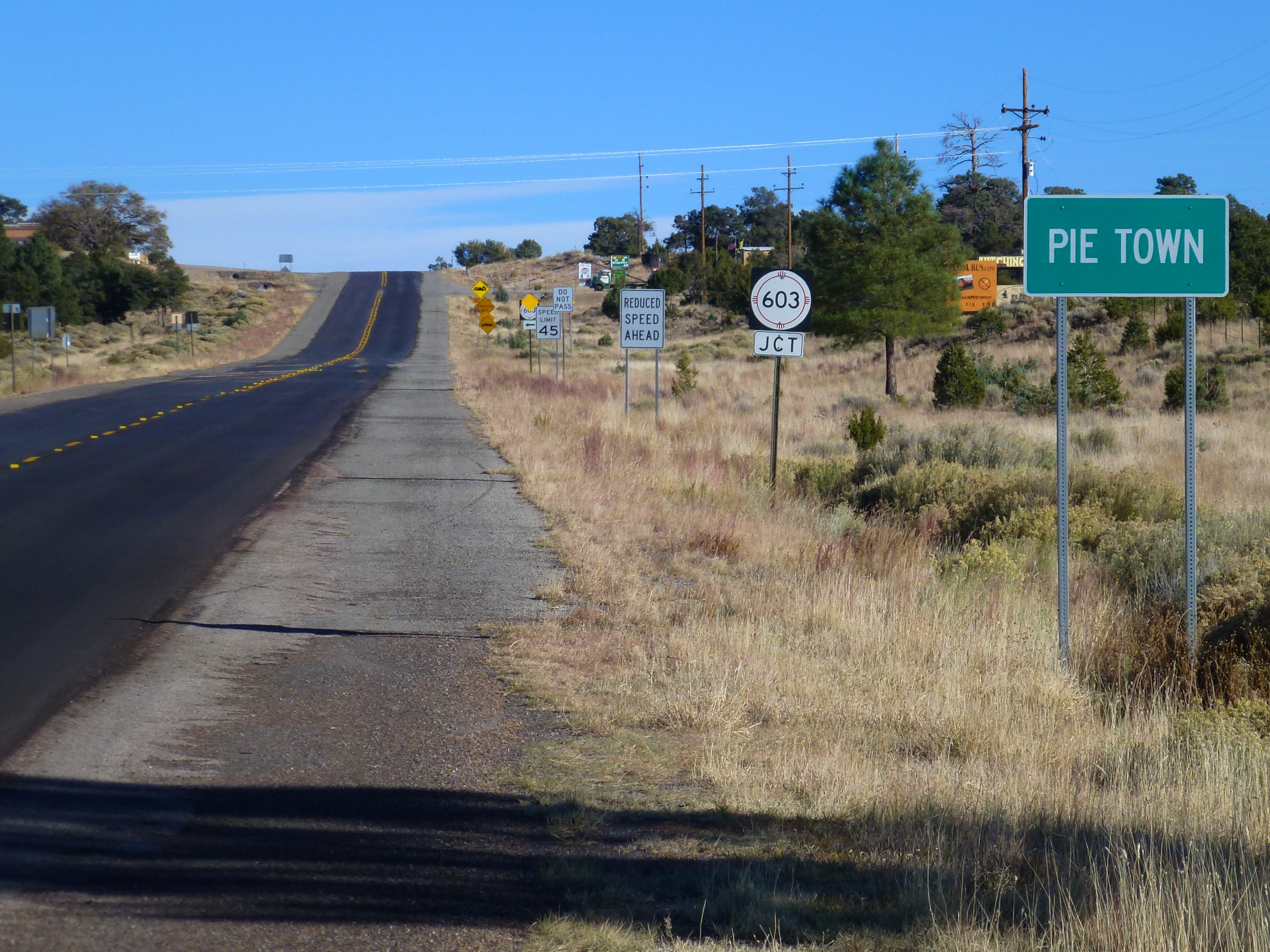
NM 603 junction on US 60 eastbound in Pie Town.

State Road 603 (NM 603) is a 22.7-mile-long (36.5 km) state highway in the US state of New Mexico. NM 603's southern terminus is at U.S. Route 60 (US 60) in Pie Town, and the northern terminus is at NM 36 north of Quemado.

== Major intersections ==
The entire route is in Catron County.

| Location | mi | km | Destinations | Notes |
|---|---|---|---|---|
| Pie Town | 0.000 | 0.000 | US 60 | Southern terminus |
| | 22.666 | 36.477 | NM 36 | Northern terminus |
1.000 mi = 1.609 km; 1.000 km = 0.621 mi
