= New Mexico State Road 117 =

State highway in New Mexico, United States

State Road 117
- NM 117 highlighted in red

Route information
- Maintained by NMDOT
- Length: 62.06 mi (99.88 km)

Major junctions
- South end: NM 36 near Quemado
- I-40 near Grants
- North end: NM 122 / Historic US 66 in Grants

Location
- Country: United States
- State: New Mexico
- Counties: Cibola

Highway system
- New Mexico State Highway System; Interstate; US; State; Scenic
← NM 116	→ NM 118

State Road 117 (NM 117) is a 62.06-mile-long (99.88 km) state road in north west New Mexico, entirely within Cibola County. The southern terminus is at NM 36 near Quemado, and the northern terminus is at NM 122 and Historic U.S. Route 66 in Grants. NM 117 runs through the El Malpais National Conservation Area.

It is one of the roads on the Trails of the Ancients Byway, one of the designated New Mexico Scenic Byways.

== History ==
The portion of NM 117 from I-40 north to NM 122 became a state highway on a road exchange agreement with Cibola County in October 1988.

== Major intersections ==
The entire route is in Cibola County.

Location	mi	km	Destinations	Notes
Mora	0.000	0.000	NM 36	Southern terminus
	56.726	91.292	I-40	I-40 exit 89
	56.818	91.440	NM 124 east	Western terminus of NM 124
Grants	62.058	99.873	NM 122 / Historic US 66	Northern terminus
1.000 mi = 1.609 km; 1.000 km = 0.621 mi
