= Cebolla Wilderness =

Wilderness area in Cibloa County, New Mexico, United States

- IUCN category Ib (wilderness area)
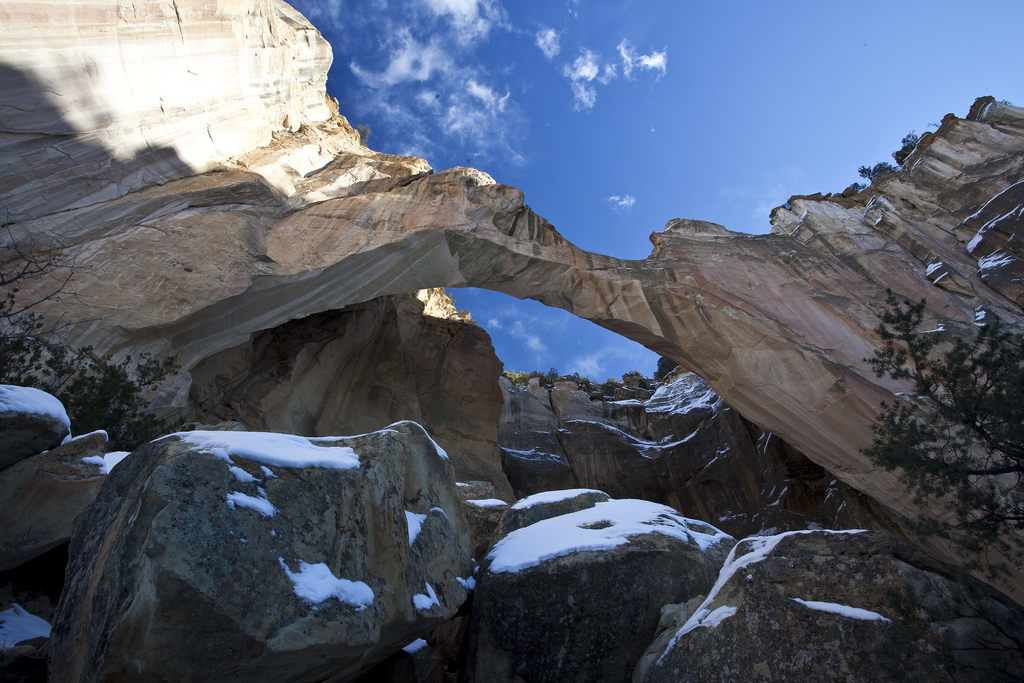
- La Ventana Natural Arch, September 2014
- Interactive map of Cebolla Wilderness
- Location: Cibola County, New Mexico, United States
- Coordinates: 34.75°N 107.92°W
- Area: 61,600 acres (24,900 ha)
- Established: 1987-12-31
- Governing body: Bureau of Land Management
- Website: Cebolla Wilderness

Cebolla Wilderness is a 61,600-acre (24,900 ha) Wilderness area located within the El Malpais National Conservation Area in Cibola County, New Mexico, United States.

== Description ==
The area was added to the National Wilderness Preservation System on December 31, 1987, by Public Law 100-225. The area is a bordered by the Acoma Pueblo to the east and the El Malpais National Monument and New Mexico Highway 117 to the west. Elevations range from 7,000 feet (2,100 m) to 8,200 feet (2,500 m). The sandstone canyons and mesas of this rimrock area include features such as La Ventana Natural Arch.

== See also ==
- List of wilderness areas of the United States
