= New Mexico State Road 36 =

State highway in New Mexico, United States

State Road 36

Route information
- Maintained by NMDOT
- Length: 72.220 mi (116.227 km)

Major junctions
- South end: US 60 in Quemado
- NM 117
- North end: NM 53 near Zuni

Location
- Country: United States
- State: New Mexico
- Counties: Catron, Cibola, McKinley

Highway system
- New Mexico State Highway System; Interstate; US; State; Scenic
← NM 35	→ NM 37

State Road 36 (NM 36) is a state highway in the US state of New Mexico. Its total length is approximately 72.2 miles (116.2 km). NM 36's southern terminus in Quemado at U.S. 60 (US 60), and the northern terminus is at NM 53.

== Major intersections ==
County	Location	mi	km	Destinations	Notes
Catron	Quemado	0.000	0.000	US 60	Southern terminus
Catron		14.878	23.944	NM 603 south	Northern terminus of NM 603
Cibola		21.510	34.617	NM 117 north	Southern terminus of NM 117
McKinley		72.220	116.227	NM 53	Northern terminus
1.000 mi = 1.609 km; 1.000 km = 0.621 mi
