= New Mexico State Road 564 =

State highway in New Mexico, United States

State Road 564
- NM 564 highlighted in red

Route information
- Maintained by NMDOT
- Length: 3.291 mi (5.296 km)

Major junctions
- West end: NM 602 / NM 610 in Gallup
- East end: NM 118 in Gallup

Location
- Country: United States
- State: New Mexico
- Counties: McKinley

Highway system
- New Mexico State Highway System; Interstate; US; State; Scenic
← NM 562	→ NM 566

State Road 564 (NM 564) is a 3.291-mile-long (5.296 km) state highway in the US state of New Mexico. NM 564's western terminus is at NM 602 and the southern terminus of NM 610 in Gallup, and the eastern terminus is at NM 118 in Gallup.

== Major intersections ==
The entire route is in Gallup, McKinley County.

mi	km	Destinations	Notes
0.000	0.000	NM 602 / NM 610 north	Western terminus; southern terminus of NM 610
3.291	5.296	NM 118	Eastern terminus
1.000 mi = 1.609 km; 1.000 km = 0.621 mi
