= La Ventana Natural Arch =

- Rock arch
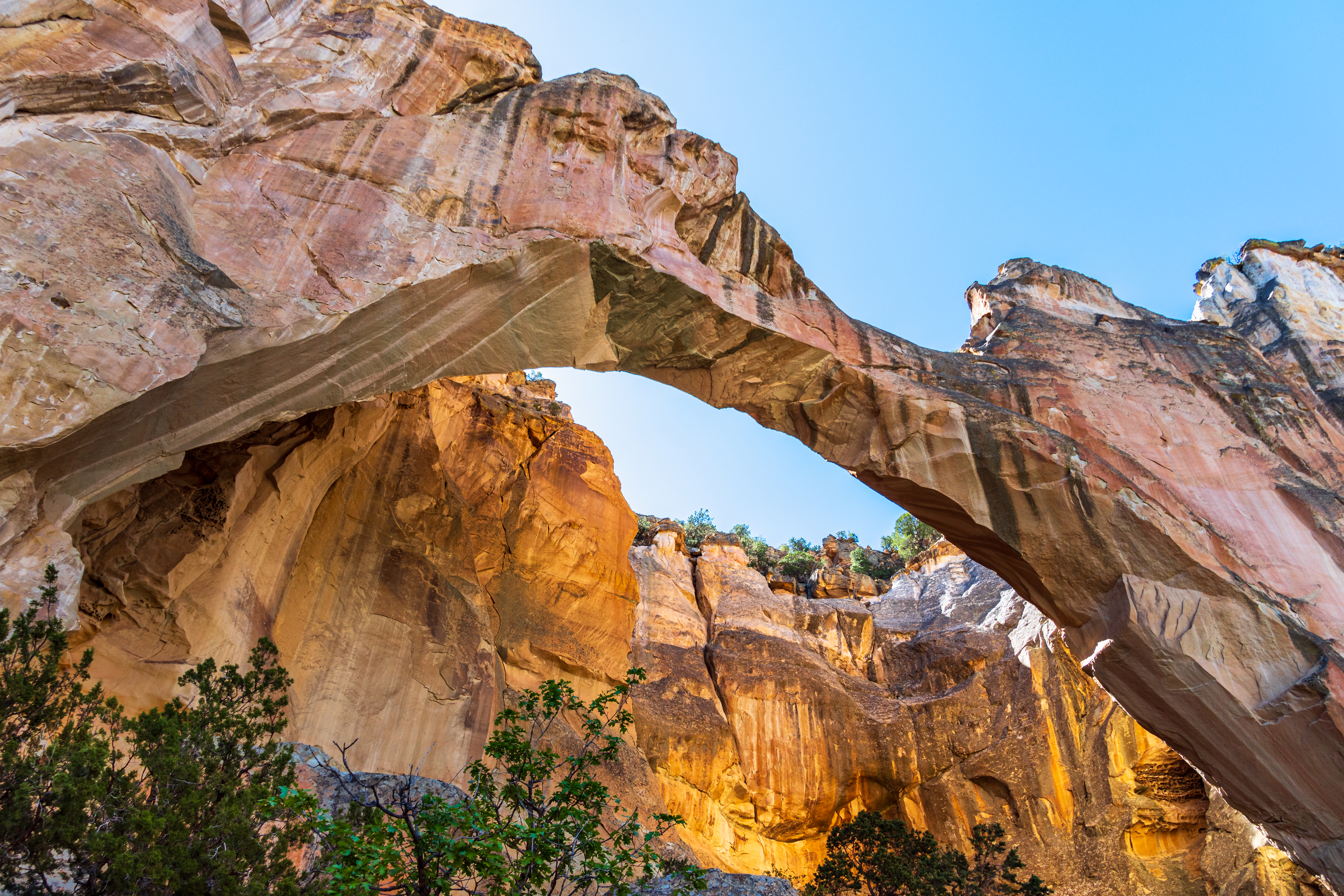
- Northwest aspect

- Location in New Mexico La Ventana Natural Arch (the United States)
- Coordinates: 34°52′09″N 107°53′21″W
- Location: El Malpais National Conservation Area / Cebolla Wilderness; Cibola County, New Mexico; United States
- Age: Jurassic
- Geology: Zuni Sandstone

Dimensions
  - Length: 135 ft (41 m)
  - Height: 80 ft (24 m)
- Elevation: 7,159 ft (2,182 m)
- Topo map: USGS North Pasture

La Ventana Natural Arch is a natural arch in Cibola County, New Mexico, United States. It is the second-largest natural arch in New Mexico and is situated in El Malpais National Conservation Area which is managed by the Bureau of Land Management. The arch is composed of Zuni Sandstone which was deposited as desert aeolian sand dunes about 165–175 million years ago, during the middle Jurassic period. Access is from Highway 117 and a 1/4 mile trail which transitions from paved to primitive as it enters the Cebolla Wilderness. This landform's toponym was officially adopted in 1989 by the U.S. Board on Geographic Names when it replaced the name "Alta Arch." The name La Ventana is a Spanish term, meaning "the window."

== Climate ==
According to the Köppen climate classification system, it is located in a Cold semi-arid climate zone, which is defined by the coldest month having an average mean temperature below 0 °C (32 °F) and at least 50% of the total annual precipitation being received during the spring and summer. This desert climate receives less than 10 inches (250 millimeters) of annual rainfall, and snowfall is generally light during the winter. Spring and fall are the most favorable seasons to visit La Ventana Arch.

== Gallery ==
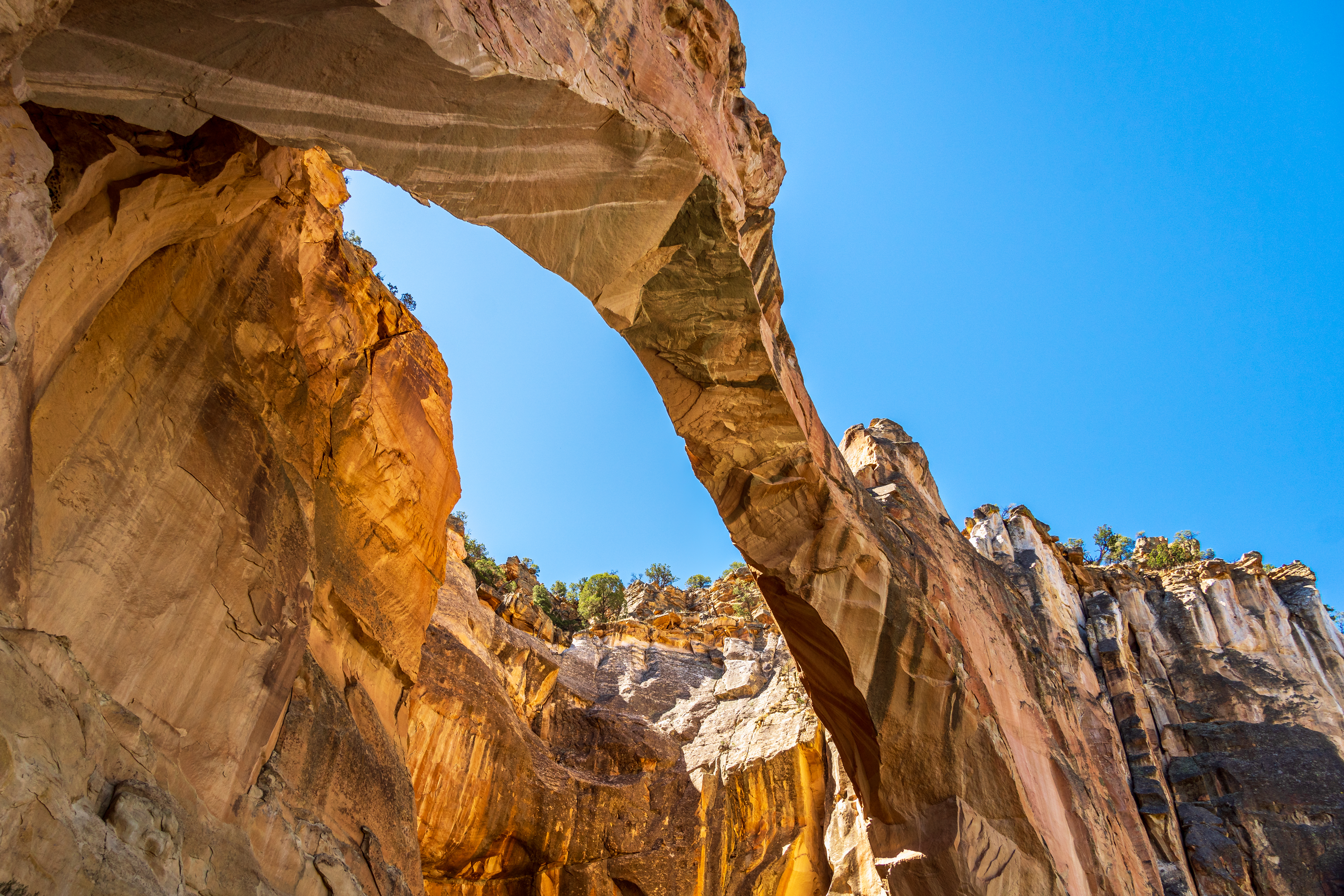

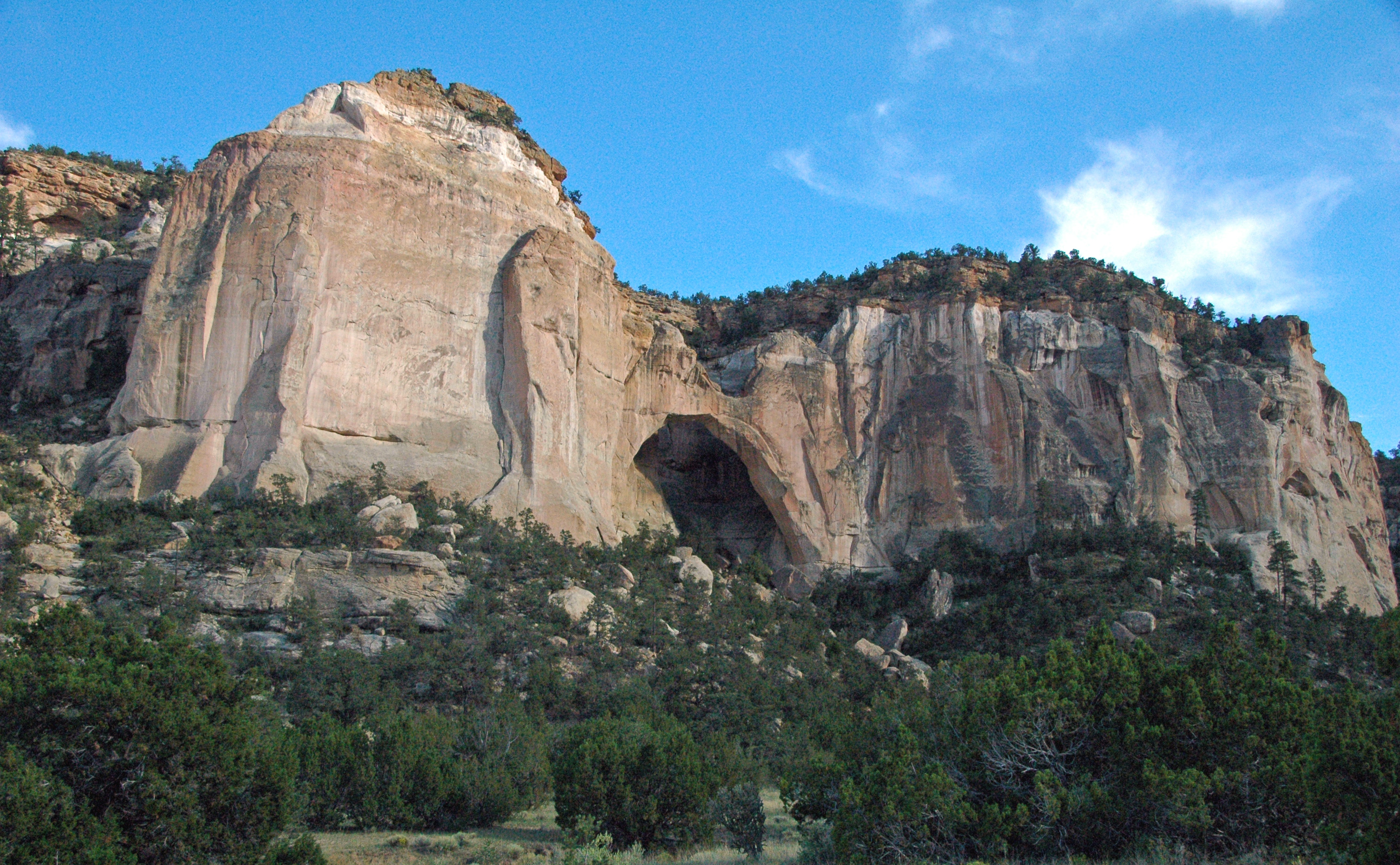

== See also ==
- Colorado Plateau
- Geology of New Mexico
