= El Malpais National Monument =

National monument in New Mexico, United States

El Malpais National Monument and National Conservation Area
- IUCN category V (protected landscape/seascape)
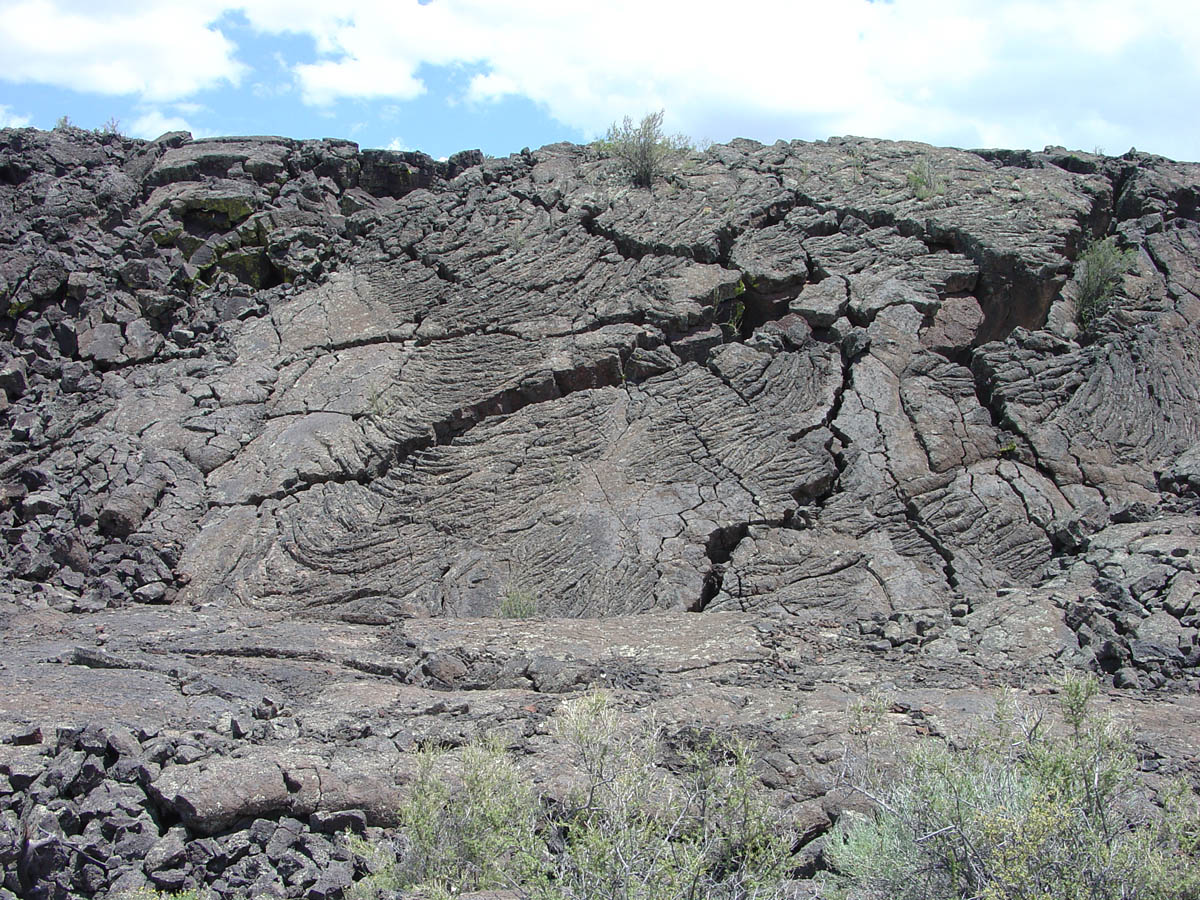
- Pahoehoe lava flow in El Malpais National Monument

- Location within New Mexico Location within the United States
- Interactive map of El Malpais National Monument and National Conservation Area
- Location: Cibola County, New Mexico, USA
- Nearest city: Grants, NM
- Coordinates: 34°52′38″N 108°03′03″W
- Area: 114,276 acres (462.46 km^{2})
- Established: December 31, 1987
- Visitors: 151,998 (in 2025)
- Governing body: National Park Service
- Website: El Malpais National Monument

El Malpais National Monument is a National Monument located in western New Mexico, in the Southwestern United States. The name El Malpais is from the Spanish term Malpaís, meaning badlands, due to the extremely barren and dramatic volcanic field that covers much of the park's area.

It is on the Trails of the Ancients Byway, one of the designated New Mexico Scenic Byways. There are many geologic features, including lava tubes and ice caves. There is also abundant wildlife to be encountered year round. Native Americans have used the area for centuries, and it became a National Monument in 1987.

== Geography and geology ==
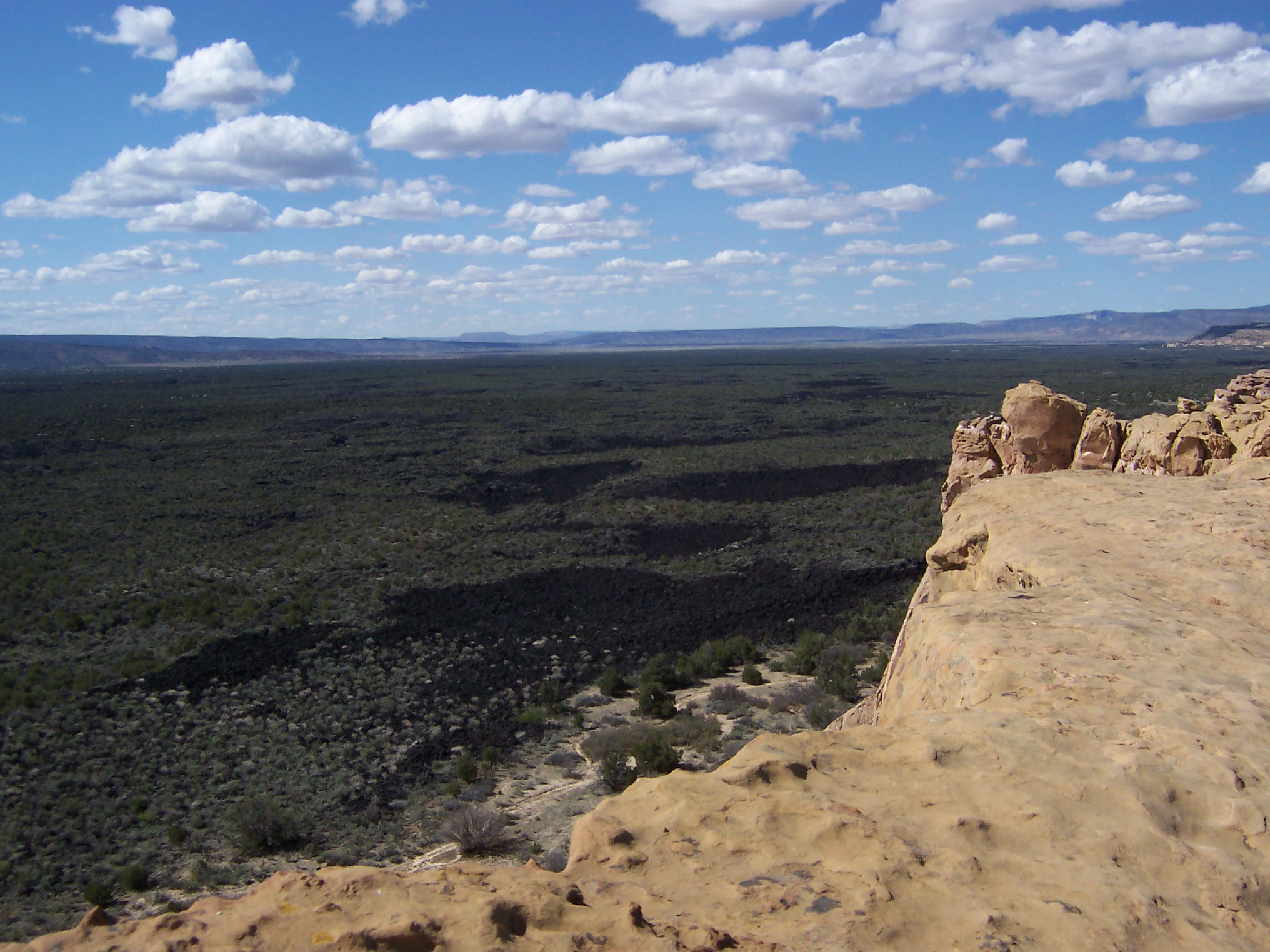
View of El Malpais Lava Fields and sandstone bluff

The lava flows, cinder cones, and other volcanic features of El Malpais are part of the Zuni-Bandera volcanic field, the second largest volcanic field in the Basin and Range Province. This volcanically active area on the southeast margin of the Colorado Plateau is located on the ancient Jemez Lineament, which provides the crustal weakness that recent magmatic intrusions and Cenozoic volcanism are attributed to.

The rugged pahoēhoē and ʻaʻā lava flows of the Zuni-Bandera eruptions (also called the Grants Lava Flows) filled a large basin, created by normal faulting associated with the Rio Grande Rift, between the high mesas of the Acoma Pueblo to the east, Mt. Taylor to the north, and the Zuni Mountain anticline to the northwest. Vents associated with these flows include Bandera Crater, El Calderon, and several other cinder cones; more than a dozen older cinder cones follow a roughly north–south distribution along the Chain of Craters west of the monument.

== Features ==
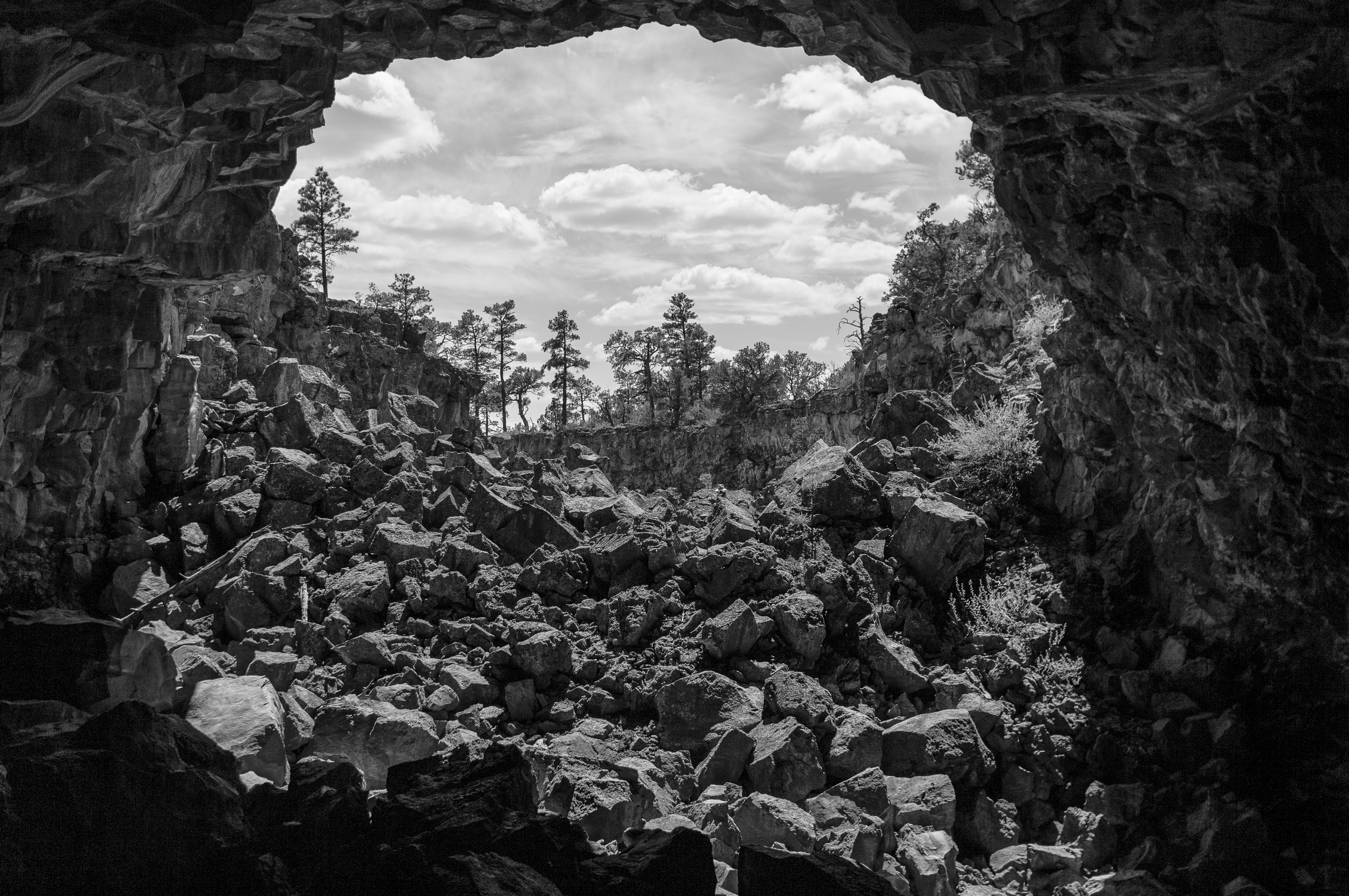
Looking out of Giant Ice Cave in the Big Tube area

El Malpais has many lava tubes; two are open to explore (unguided) with a free caving permit, available at NPS-staffed facilities. The two caves currently accessible by permit are Giant Ice in the Big Tubes area, and Lava Bomb in the Hoya de Cibola area. The Junction Bridge lava tube ia also accessible as part of the El Calderon trail.

A nearby scenic overlook at Sandstone Bluffs offers spectacular panoramic views over the monument's lava flows.

== Natural history ==
Some of the oldest Rocky Mountain Douglas-firs (Pseudotsuga menziesii subsp. glauca) on Earth can be found living in El Malpais Monument. In 2020, a new population of hart's-tongue ferns (Asplenium scolopendrium) was discovered inside of a cave with basaltic lava flows in El Malpais, which represents the first confirmed population of the species in the United States or Canada west of the Mississippi; all other known populations of the fern are around the Great Lakes, Alabama, and Tennessee. Genetic analyses and surveys are currently being performed to determine the population's variation and overall health.

El Malpais’ lava flows and associated lava-tubes provide a unique and critical roosting habitat for bats. These underground structures offer stable temperatures, protection, and proximity to limited water resources, making them essential hibernacula for diverse bat species, setting the park apart from others with similar woodlands and water resources. Conservation efforts to preserve these lava-tubes are vital for safeguarding bat populations, especially in light of potential threats like White-nose syndrome. From December 2010 to June 2013, all caves were temporarily closed to recreational use to protect bats from the spread of White Nose Syndrome (WNS) until a permitting process, including visitor screening for WNS, could be implemented. Recent research at El Malpais shows that the bacterial microbiome of bats and the bacterial microbiome in the caves can affect each other, which may provide more insight into the connections between cave environments, defense systems of bats, and WNS.

== History ==
El Malpais National Monument
- Long title: An Act to establish the El Malpais National Monument and the El Malpais National Conservation Area in the State of New Mexico, to authorize the Masau Trail, and for other purposes.
- Enacted by: the 100th United States Congress
- Effective: December 31, 1987

Citations
- Public law: Pub. L. 100–225
- Statutes at Large: 101 Stat. 1539

Codification
- Titles amended: Title 16—Conservation
- U.S.C. sections created: 16 U.S.C. §§ 460uu–460uu-50

Legislative history
- Introduced in the House as H.R. 403 by Bill Richardson (D–NM) on January 7, 1987; Committee consideration by House Interior and Insular Affairs; Passed the House on June 1, 1987; Passed the Senate on December 17, 1987 (unanimous consent) with amendment; House agreed to Senate amendment on December 18, 1987 (unanimous consent); Signed into law by President Ronald Reagan on December 31, 1987

The area around El Malpais was used for resources, settlement, and travel by Oasisamerica cultures, Native Americans, and Spanish colonial and pioneer exploration. Archaeological sites remain in the park. People of the Acoma Pueblo used to utilize the lava tubes that would collect cold air as sanctuary to protect them from the heat above. Some caves hold ice year round, which can be 2,000 years old. The Acoma and Zuni Pueblos forged a trail through El Malpais that connected the Pueblos, a hundred miles apart. Along the trail, ice from the caves would be melted as a water source.

In the 1940s the Malpais lava field was one of the eight candidate sites considered by the Manhattan Project to test detonate the first atomic bomb, the Trinity nuclear test, which did occur to the south at White Sands Proving Ground. The Department of Defense did use the site as a bombing range to train pilots during World War II.

After the war, the Bureau of Land Management became the administrator of the area. In 1987, President Reagan signed Pub. L. 100–225 that created El Malpais National Monument and designated it a unit of the National Park Service. It is jointly managed with the nearby El Morro National Monument. The Acoma Pueblo did not want the United States to make the area a National Monument. They asked for their land back, as it was used for spiritual purposes. Congress did not agree and went ahead with the Monument, while allowing sections to be closed at the Pueblos' request for spiritual use.

== Flora and fauna ==
Over 190 species of birds can be seen in El Malpais, occupying various habitats the area offers. Raptors including red-tailed hawks, American kestrels, peregrine falcons, great horned owls, and wester screech-owls may be seen. The region also has significant reptile and amphibian biodiversity, including bullsnakes that mimic rattlesnakes, horned lizards that can double their size in self defense, venomous rattlesnakes, collared lizards that warm up in the sun, and canyon treefrogs that lay their eggs in the tinajas. Mammals found in the area include black bears, coyotes, elk, and bats. Many moths and butterflies can also be encountered in the park, including Western Tiger and Black Swallowtail, Mourning Cloak, Mexican Tiger Moth, and Giant Leopard Moth.

Conifers such as piñon, alligator juniper, oneseed juniper, Rocky Mountain juniper, ponderosa pine, quaking aspen, and Douglas fir are found here. Shrubs include sagebrush, rabbitbrush, mountain mahogany, Apache plume, and more. Many wildflowers, such as paintbrush, evening primrose, and desert globemallow can be seen. Prickly pear, claret cup, and cane cholla cacti can be found as well. Cinder phacelia is a flowering plant that can only be found in El Malpais or in Sunset Crater National Monument. Moss and other bryophyte gardens also form in El Malpais, as a result of ice melting and dripping water along humid, cool, sunlit cave entrances. 95 mosses and 15 liverworts have been documented, included species that aren't usually found in New Mexico's climate. Four vegetative communities are identified in the area, competing for space and resources. They are Grass-Shrub, Piñon-Juniper, Ponderosa Pine, and Lava Complex.

== Protection and management ==
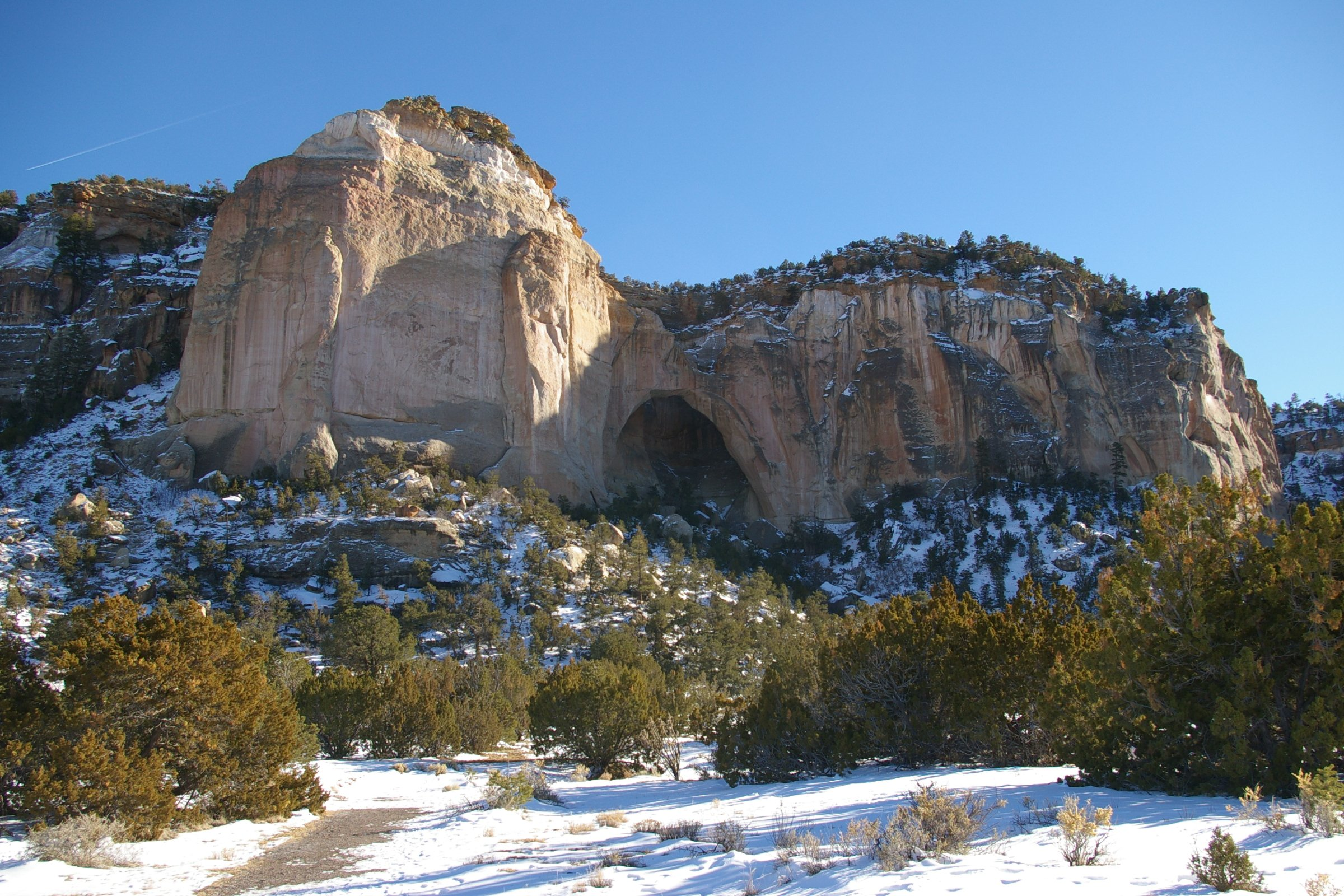
El Malpais National Conservation Area: La Ventana Natural Arch

The U.S. National Park Service protects, manages, and interprets El Malpais National Monument. El Malpais Visitor Center (formerly The Northwest New Mexico Visitor Center) is just south of Exit 85 off I-40 in Grants, New Mexico.

The adjacent El Malpais National Conservation Area is protected and managed by the U.S. Bureau of Land Management. They staff the El Malpais National Conservation Area Ranger Station 8 miles down State Highway 117 south of I-40 Exit 89.

The Cibola National Forest conserves large natural areas, wildlife, and habitats in the surrounding region as well.

== In literature ==
The second portion of the 1932 book Brave New World by Aldous Huxley takes place on the "savage reservation", which is located on land encompassing the park's area.

The malpais is the setting for a western story, "Flint" (November, 1960) by Louis L'Amour. Flint is a successful business man who thinks he is dying of cancer and returns to a hidden campsite within the malpais he had learned of in his youth.

A scene in Cormac McCarthy's 1985 novel Blood Meridian takes place on the malpais.

== See also ==
- List of national monuments of the United States
