= El Malpais National Conservation Area =

Protected area in New Mexico, United States

- IUCN category V (protected landscape/seascape)
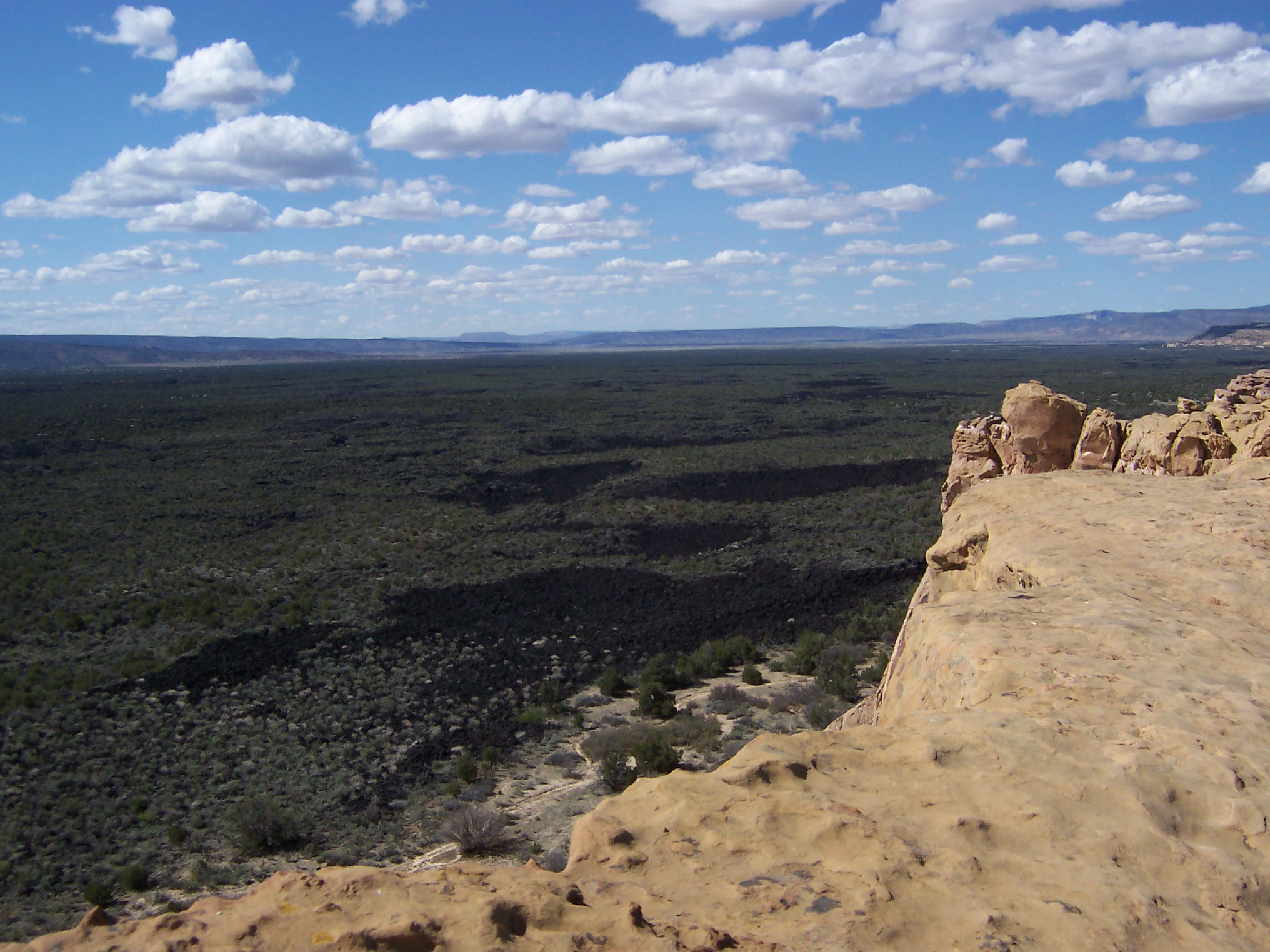
- El Malpais National Conservation Area

- Location within the United States
- Location: Cibola County, New Mexico, United States
- Nearest city: Grants, New Mexico
- Coordinates: 34°51′32″N 108°01′16″W
- Area: 263,000 acres (1,060 km^{2})
- Established: 1987
- Governing body: Bureau of Land Management
- Website: El Malpais National Conservation Area

The El Malpais National Conservation Area is a federally protected conservation area in the U.S. state of New Mexico. The El Malpais National Conservation area was established in 1987 and is managed by the Bureau of Land Management as part of the National Landscape Conservation System. The adjoining El Malpais National Monument was established at the same time and is managed by the National Park Service.

The 263,000-acre (1,060 km^{2}) El Malpais NCA includes two wilderness areas — the West Malpais Wilderness and Cebolla Wilderness Area — covering almost 100,000 acres (400 km^{2}).

== Cultural landscape ==
For more than 10,000 years people have interacted with the El Malpais landscape. Historic and prehistoric Cultural landscape sites provide connections to past times. More than mere artifacts, these cultural resources are kept alive by the spiritual and physical presence of contemporary Indian groups, including the Puebloan peoples of Acoma, Laguna and Zuni, and the Ramah Navajo.

== Features ==
El Malpais ('the badlands') is Spanish, pronounced Mal-(rhymes with wall)-pie-ees(rhymes with rice). The El Malpais National Conservation Area was established to protect nationally significant geological, archaeological, ecological, cultural, scenic, scientific, and wilderness resources surrounding the Grants Lava Flows.

In addition to the two wilderness areas, the NCA includes sandstone cliffs, canyons, La Ventana Natural Arch, the Chain of Craters Back Country Byway and the Narrows Picnic Area.

There are two visitor centers that serve the NCA, both off of I-40. El Malpais Visitor Center, operated jointly with the National Park Service, is on the south side of exit 85. The Bureau of Land Management Ranger Station is about eight miles south of exit 89 on State Highway 117.
