= New Mexico State Road 53 =

State highway in New Mexico, United States

State Road 53
- NM-53 highlighted in red

Route information
- Maintained by NMDOT
- Length: 86.002 mi (138.407 km)

Major junctions
- West end: SR 61 at the Arizona border near Zuni
- NM 36 east-northeast of Zuni; I-40 in Grants
- East end: NM 122 in Grants

Location
- Country: United States
- State: New Mexico
- Counties: Cibola, McKinley

Highway system
- New Mexico State Highway System; Interstate; US; State; Scenic
← NM 52	→ US 54

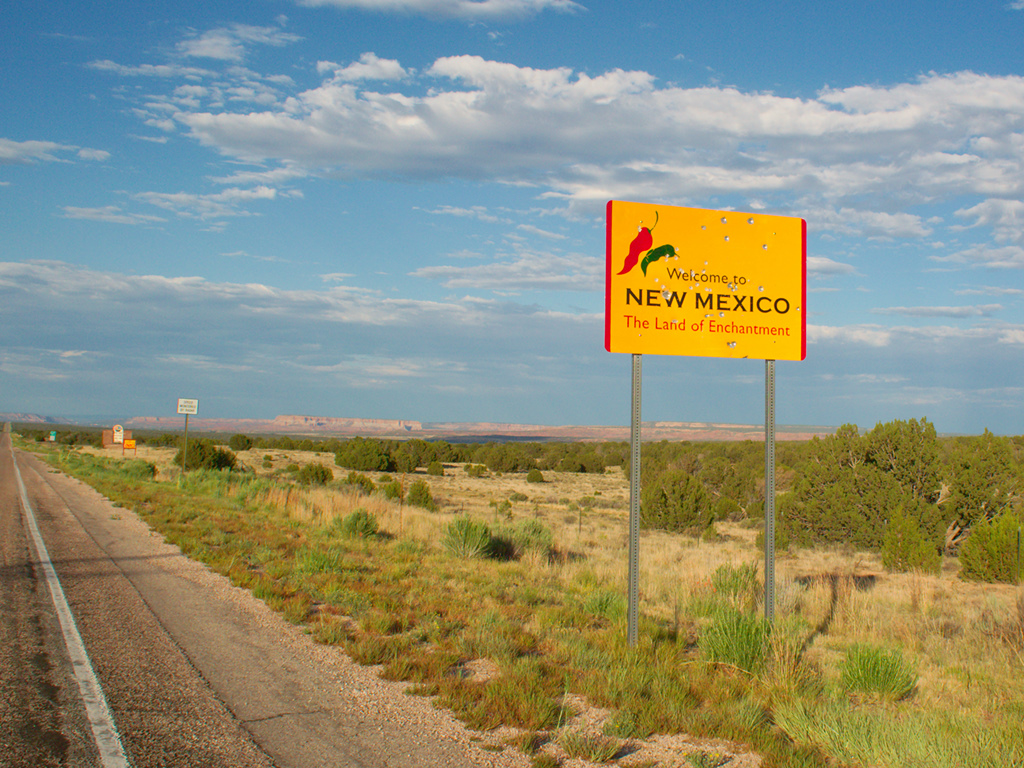
NM 53 eastbound near the Arizona border.

State Road 53 (NM 53) is a state highway in the US state of New Mexico. Its total length is approximately 86 miles (138 km). NM 53's western terminus is a continuation as Arizona State Route 61 (AZ 61) at the Arizona border west-southwest of Zuni, and the eastern terminus at NM 122 in the village of Grants.

== History ==
State Road 54
- Location: Arizona state line to Grants
- Existed: 1920s–1930s

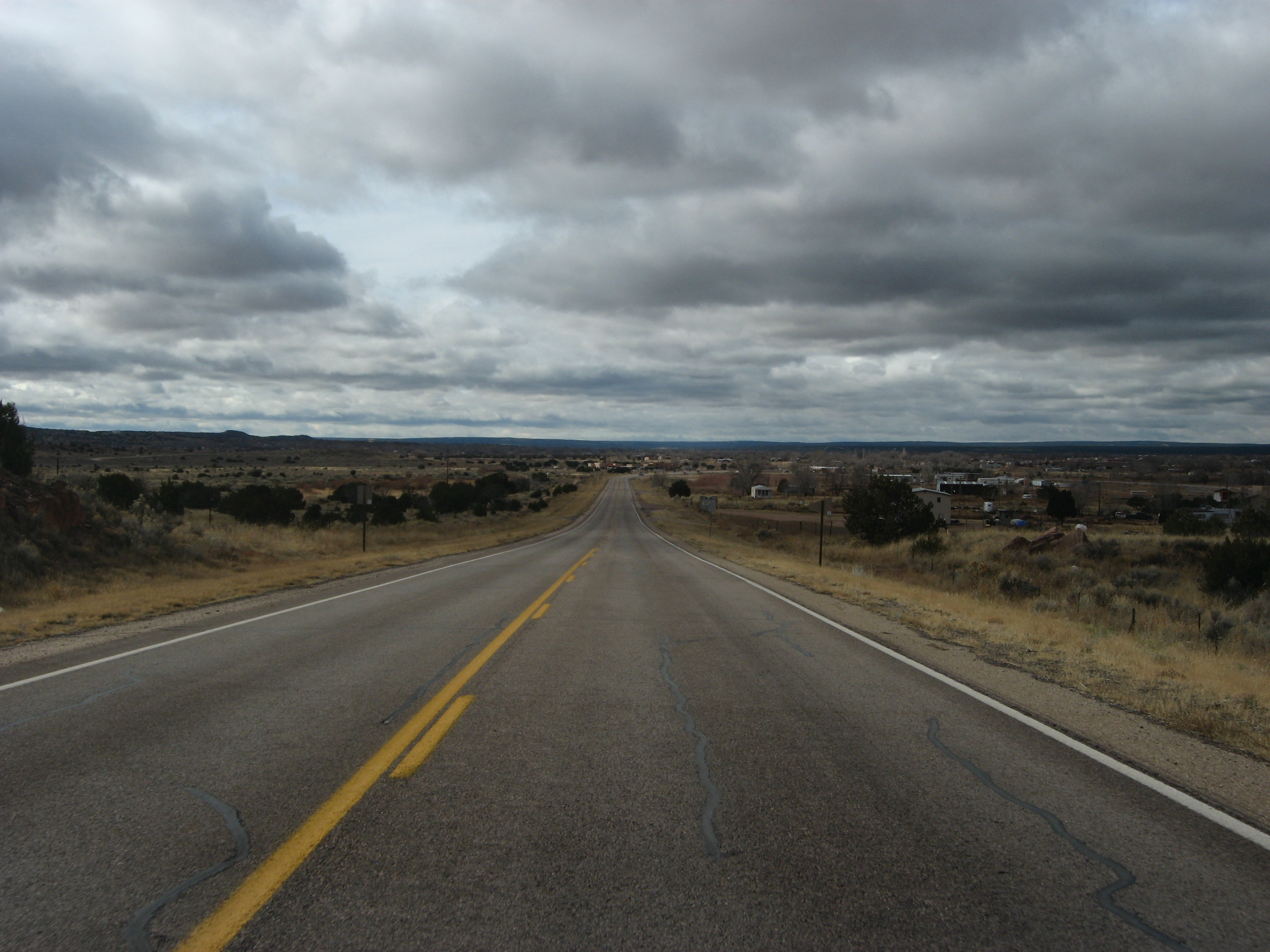
NM 53 approaching Zuni Pueblo

NM 53 was originally the east end of NM 54 and then after 1927 a short route extending west from Grants, it was extended over old NM 36 to the Arizona border by the 1940s. It was renamed as NM 53 to avoid confusion with U.S. Route 54 (US 54). In the 1940s, NM 53 was extended northeast from Milan to San Mateo, a small town near Mt. Taylor. The segment from Milan to San Mateo was renumbered NM 605 in 1988.

== Major intersections ==
County	Location	mi	km	Destinations	Notes
McKinley		0.000	0.000	SR 61 south	Continuation into Arizona
McKinley		21.147	34.033	NM 602 north	Southern terminus of NM 602
McKinley		21.614	34.784	NM 36 south	Northern terminus of NM 36
Cibola	Grants	85.600– 85.700	137.760– 137.921	I-40 – Albuquerque, Gallup	I-40 exit 81
Cibola	Grants	86.002	138.407	Historic US 66 (NM 122)	Eastern terminus; serves Cibola General Hospital; road continues north unpaved as Lava Road
1.000 mi = 1.609 km; 1.000 km = 0.621 mi

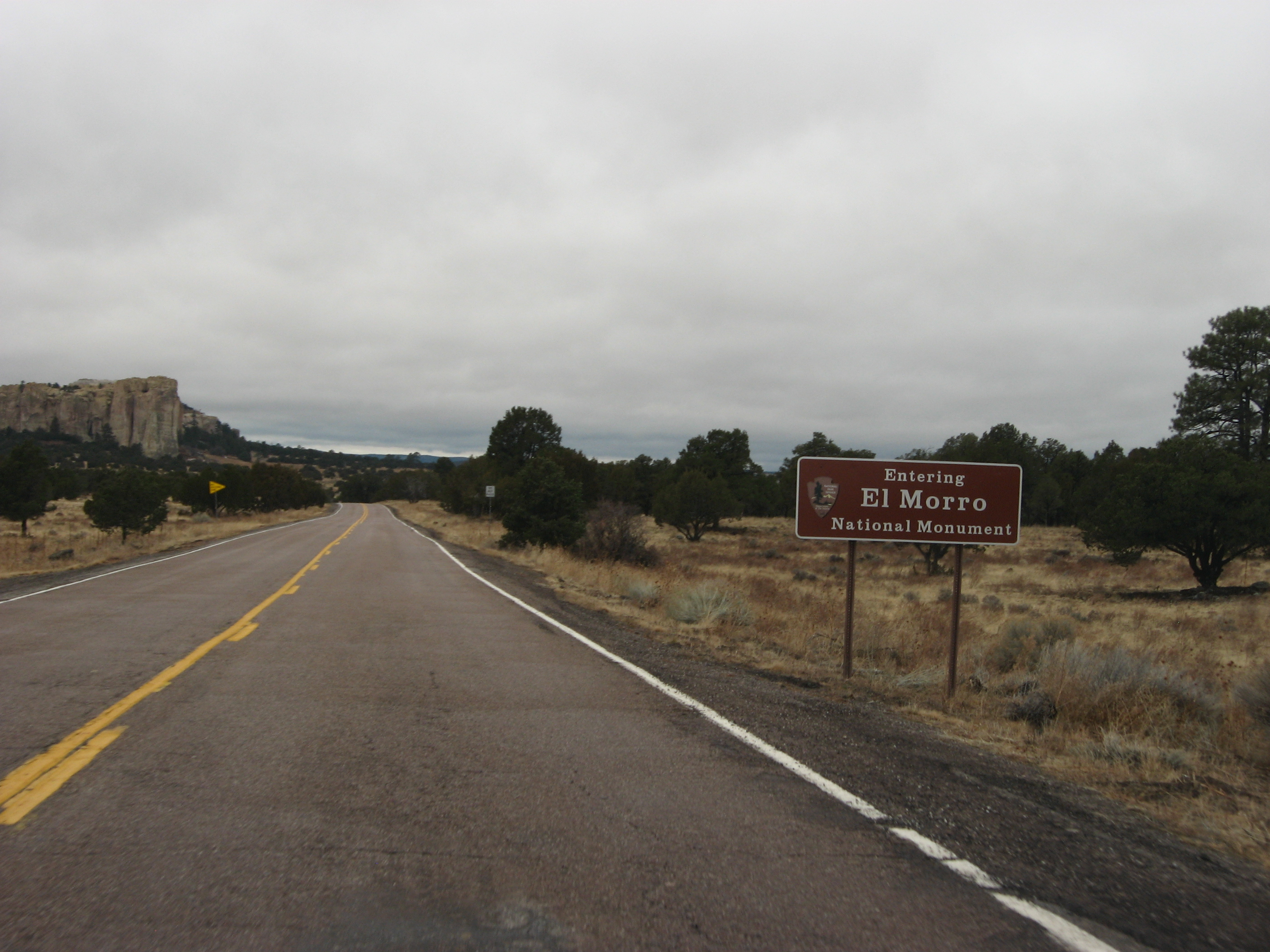

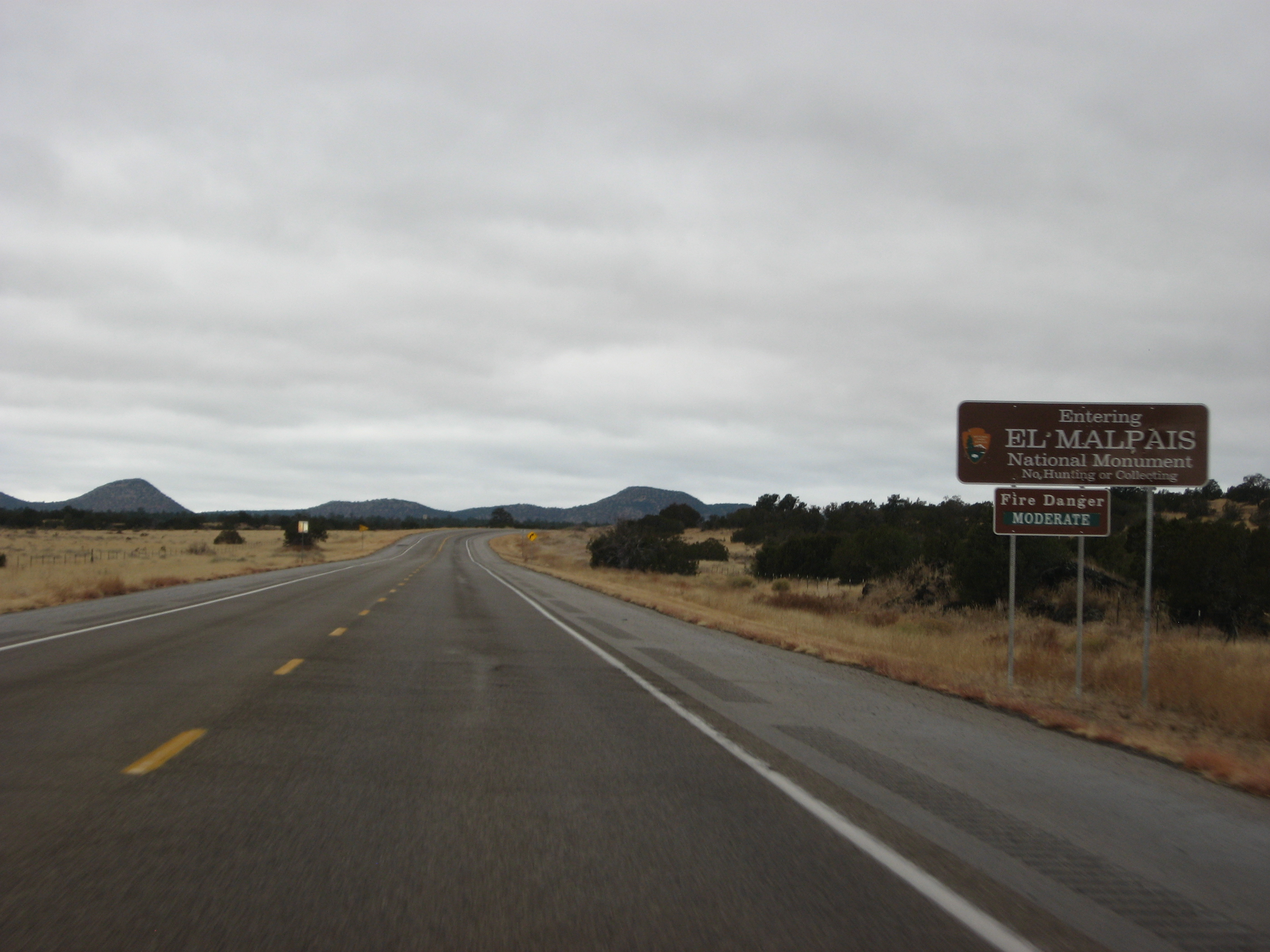

== See also ==
- List of state roads in New Mexico
