= New Mexico State Road 602 =

Highway in New Mexico

State Road 602

Route information
- Maintained by NMDOT
- Length: 30.727 mi (49.450 km)

Major junctions
- South end: NM 53 near Black Rock
- North end: I-40 / US 491 in Gallup

Location
- Country: United States
- State: New Mexico
- Counties: McKinley

Highway system
- New Mexico State Highway System; Interstate; US; State; Scenic
← NM 601	→ NM 603

State Road 602 (NM 602) is a 30.727-mile-long (49.450 km) state highway in the US state of New Mexico. NM 602's southern terminus is at NM 53 east of Black Rock, and the northern terminus is at Interstate 40 (I-40) and U.S. Route 491 (US 491) in Gallup.

== Major intersections ==
The entire route is in McKinley County.

Location	mi	km	Destinations	Notes
	0.000	0.000	NM 53	Southern terminus
Gallup	28.614	46.050	NM 564 east / NM 610 north	Western terminus of NM 564, southern terminus of NM 610
Gallup	30.239	48.665	Aztec Avenue to NM 118	Access to NM 118 via Aztec Avenue and Arnold Street
Gallup	30.727	49.450	I-40 / US 491 north	Northern terminus, southern terminus of US 491
1.000 mi = 1.609 km; 1.000 km = 0.621 mi
