= La Cieneguilla Petroglyphs =

Rock art site in New Mexico

- Rock art
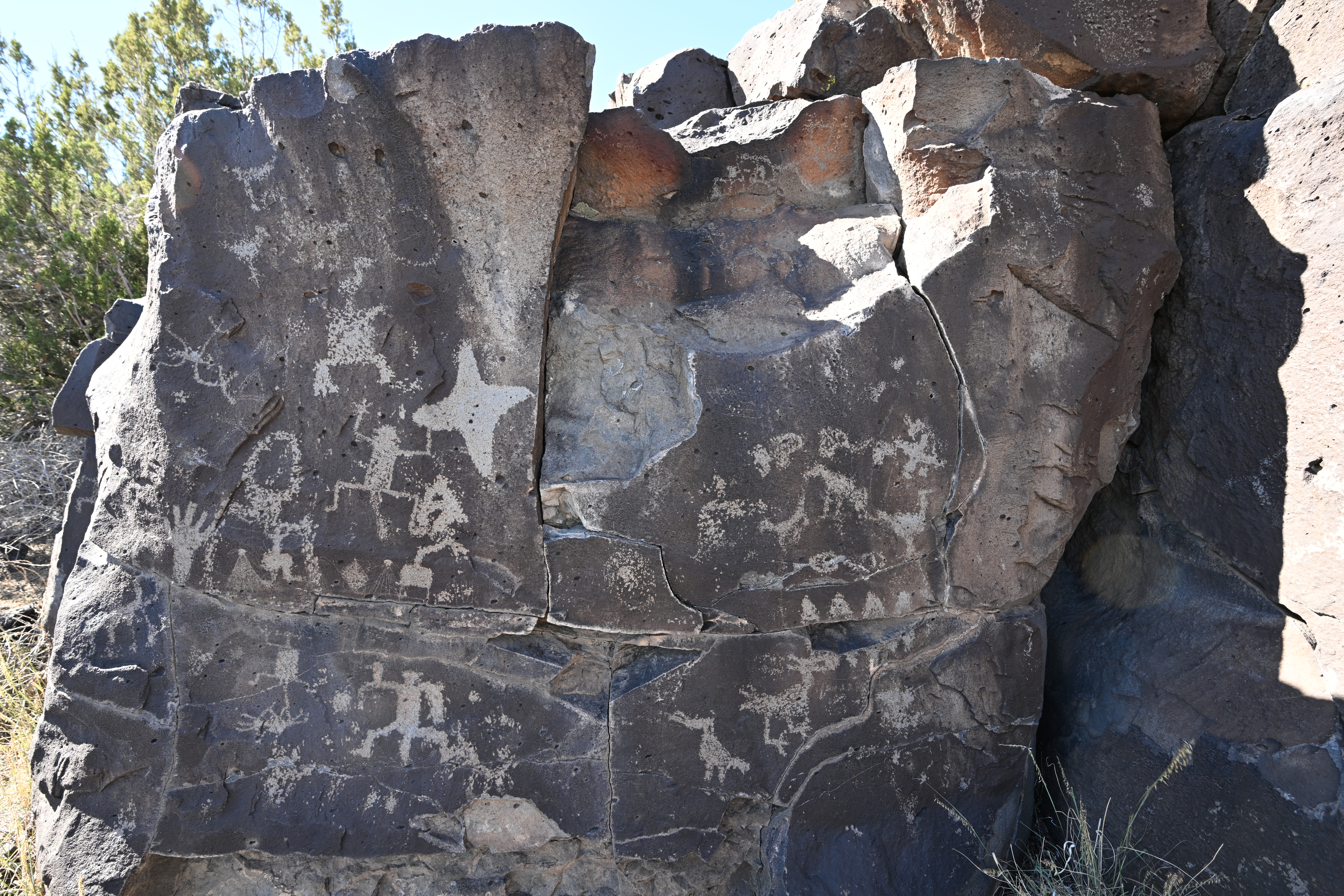
- A large collection of petroglyphs on a rock, 2023

- Coordinates: 35.6047°N 106.1240°W
- Location: 662-674 Paseo Real, Santa Fe, NM 87507
- Age: 400-800 years old
- Etymology: "Ciénaga", Spanish for "mash"
- Defining authority: Bureau of Land Management

Area
  - Total: 1.5 km (0.93 mi)

The La Cieneguilla Petroglyphs are a rock art site near Santa Fe, New Mexico. It is a mesa above the Sante Fe River containing thousands of petroglyphs. Followers of the Camino Real de Tierra Adentro also pass this site.

== History ==
The petroglyphs were created by speakers of the Keres and Tanoan languages from the 13th and 17th centuries. Their descendants live in the Cochiti and Santo Domingo pueblos. A contrasting theory states the markings were made from 8000 to 2000 BC.

== Features ==
Many figures depict a humpbacked flute player, the fertility deity Kokopelli, and birds. A survey in 1991 recorded 1,385 bird figures out of the over 4400 total. The petroglyphs' meanings, despite being studied extensively, are unknown. Many of the etchings are also indecipherable. The northern part of the site is less-studied.

== Threats ==
The area is commonly used for target practice for paintball players, resulting in vandalism and the defacement of rock art. Graffiti is also prevalent.
