= Quemado, New Mexico =

- Census-designated place
- Location within the state of New Mexico Quemado (the United States)
- Coordinates: 34°20′23″N 108°29′54″W
- Country: United States
- State: New Mexico
- County: Catron

Area
  - Total: 1.80 sq mi (4.66 km^{2})
  - Land: 1.79 sq mi (4.64 km^{2})
  - Water: 0.012 sq mi (0.03 km^{2})
- Elevation: 6,877 ft (2,096 m)

Population (2020)
  - Total: 163
  - Density: 91.1/sq mi (35.16/km^{2})
- Time zone: UTC-5 (Mountain (MST))
  - Summer (DST): MDT
- Area code: 575
- GNIS feature ID: 2584190

Quemado is a census-designated place in Catron County, New Mexico, United States. As of the 2020 census, Quemado had a population of 163. Walter De Maria's 1977 art installation, The Lightning Field, is between Quemado and Pie Town, New Mexico.

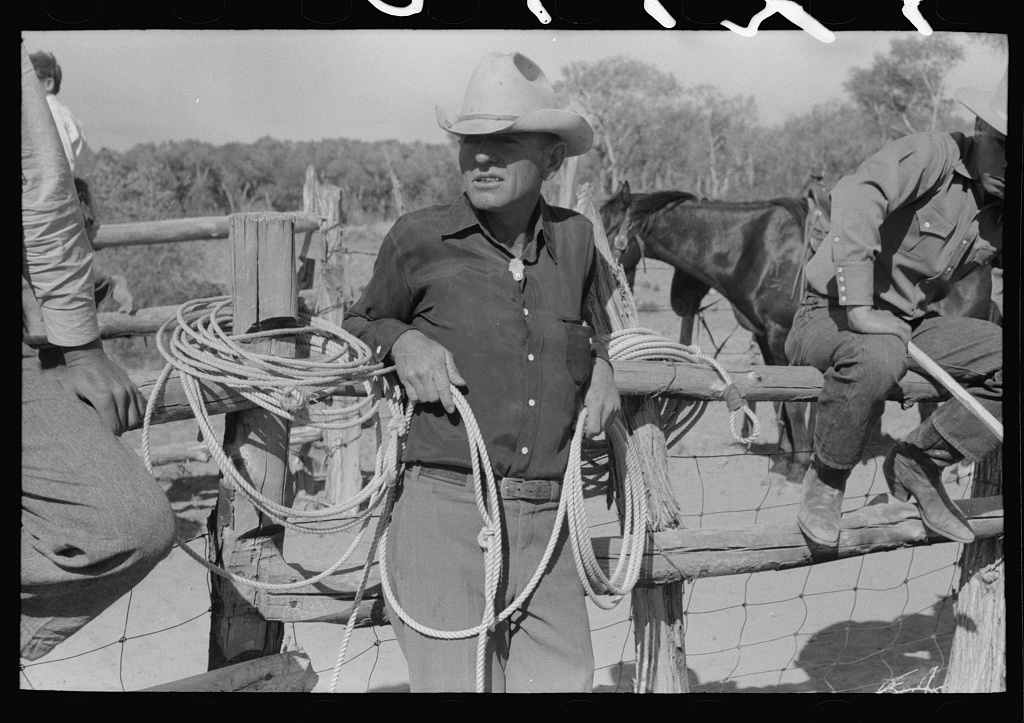
Cowboy at Rodeo. Quemado, 1940

== Geography ==
=== Climate ===
Quemado (meaning "burnt" in English) was named by Spanish conquistadors due to the blackened stones that cover the earth. It was caused by a fire that preceded the arrival of the Spanish in the early 1500s and the carbon remains partially due to paltry rainfall in the region.

Quemado is categorized as being within the 6a USDA hardiness zone, meaning temperatures can get as low as -10 to -5 °F.

Climate data for Quemado, New Mexico, 1991–2020 normals, extremes 1918–present
Month	Jan	Feb	Mar	Apr	May	Jun	Jul	Aug	Sep	Oct	Nov	Dec	Year
Record high °F (°C)	69 (21)	77 (25)	80 (27)	88 (31)	95 (35)	99 (37)	100 (38)	99 (37)	94 (34)	87 (31)	81 (27)	71 (22)	100 (38)
Mean maximum °F (°C)	58.2 (14.6)	64.2 (17.9)	71.5 (21.9)	76.8 (24.9)	85.4 (29.7)	92.5 (33.6)	92.5 (33.6)	89.5 (31.9)	86.0 (30.0)	79.5 (26.4)	69.9 (21.1)	60.7 (15.9)	93.8 (34.3)
Mean daily maximum °F (°C)	46.2 (7.9)	49.9 (9.9)	58.0 (14.4)	65.6 (18.7)	74.8 (23.8)	83.8 (28.8)	84.5 (29.2)	81.7 (27.6)	76.5 (24.7)	67.9 (19.9)	55.7 (13.2)	46.1 (7.8)	65.9 (18.8)
Daily mean °F (°C)	30.4 (−0.9)	34.3 (1.3)	40.4 (4.7)	46.4 (8.0)	54.3 (12.4)	63.4 (17.4)	68.3 (20.2)	66.2 (19.0)	59.7 (15.4)	49.5 (9.7)	38.6 (3.7)	30.8 (−0.7)	48.5 (9.2)
Mean daily minimum °F (°C)	14.7 (−9.6)	18.7 (−7.4)	22.8 (−5.1)	27.2 (−2.7)	33.9 (1.1)	43.0 (6.1)	52.2 (11.2)	50.7 (10.4)	43.0 (6.1)	31.2 (−0.4)	21.5 (−5.8)	15.5 (−9.2)	31.2 (−0.4)
Mean minimum °F (°C)	−3.8 (−19.9)	0.0 (−17.8)	6.1 (−14.4)	15.2 (−9.3)	20.8 (−6.2)	32.7 (0.4)	44.6 (7.0)	42.9 (6.1)	30.4 (−0.9)	16.4 (−8.7)	1.6 (−16.9)	−3.5 (−19.7)	−8.8 (−22.7)
Record low °F (°C)	−33 (−36)	−19 (−28)	−20 (−29)	−2 (−19)	8 (−13)	18 (−8)	31 (−1)	32 (0)	18 (−8)	−1 (−18)	−20 (−29)	−20 (−29)	−33 (−36)
Average precipitation inches (mm)	0.47 (12)	0.55 (14)	0.64 (16)	0.39 (9.9)	0.12 (3.0)	0.58 (15)	1.88 (48)	2.92 (74)	1.89 (48)	0.92 (23)	0.49 (12)	0.51 (13)	11.36 (287.9)
Average snowfall inches (cm)	3.8 (9.7)	3.9 (9.9)	1.8 (4.6)	0.3 (0.76)	0.2 (0.51)	0.0 (0.0)	0.0 (0.0)	0.0 (0.0)	0.0 (0.0)	0.6 (1.5)	1.4 (3.6)	5.6 (14)	17.6 (44.57)
Average extreme snow depth inches (cm)	2.6 (6.6)	2.0 (5.1)	0.8 (2.0)	0.1 (0.25)	0.1 (0.25)	0.0 (0.0)	0.0 (0.0)	0.0 (0.0)	0.0 (0.0)	0.3 (0.76)	1.1 (2.8)	2.3 (5.8)	4.3 (11)
Average precipitation days (≥ 0.01 in)	2.6	3.1	2.1	1.5	1.4	1.5	7.4	8.9	4.3	3.4	2.5	3.4	42.1
Average snowy days (≥ 0.1 in)	1.6	1.8	1.2	0.4	0.1	0.0	0.0	0.0	0.0	0.2	0.7	2.4	8.4
Source 1: NOAA
Source 2: National Weather Service

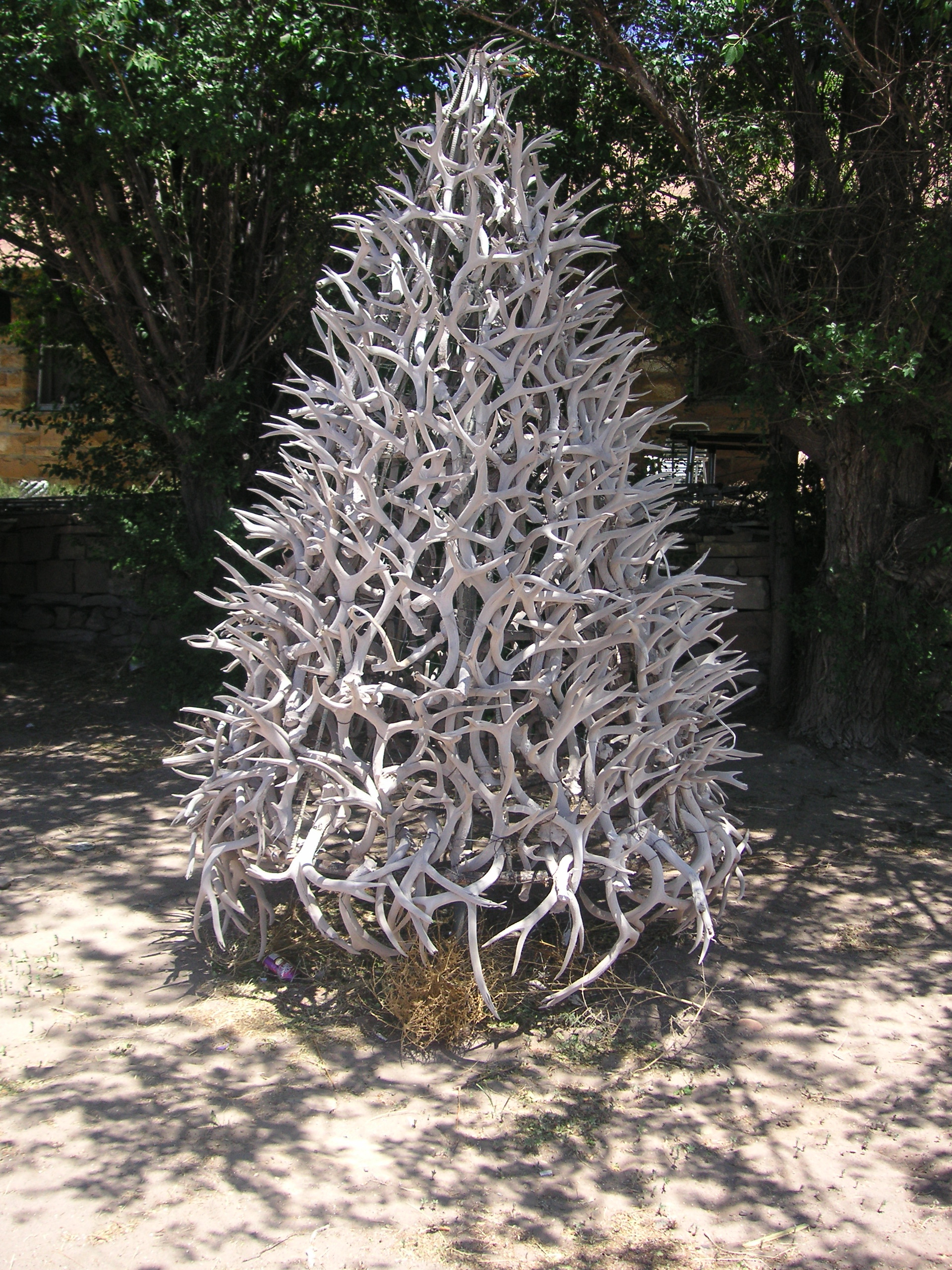
Antler tree in Quemado, 2006

== Demographics ==
Historical population
Census	Pop.	Note	%±
2020	163		—
U.S. Decennial Census

== Education ==
The school district is Quemado Schools.

== Notable residents ==
Jerry D. Thompson, historian of the American Southwest, was reared in Quemado.

== See also ==
- List of census-designated places in New Mexico
- The Lightning Field, located near Pie Town. Tours meet in Quemado
