= List of state roads in New Mexico =

State Road System
- Standard route signage in New Mexico

Highway names
- Interstates: Interstate XX (I-XX)
- US Highways: U.S. Route XX (US XX)
- State: State Road XX (NM XX)

System links
- New Mexico State Highway System; Interstate; US; State; Scenic

State roads in New Mexico, along with the Interstate Highway System, and the United States Numbered Highway System, fall under the jurisdiction of the New Mexico Department of Transportation (NMDOT). The U.S. state of New Mexico has 412 state roads, totaling 7,405.762 miles (11,918.419 km) that criss-cross the 33 counties of the state. (Note: Total mileage is a summation of the mileages below.) Most highway numbers are one, two, or three digits long, however there are three highways that have four digit highway numbers. These highways are New Mexico State Road 1113 (NM 1113), NM 5001, and NM 6563.

There are 26 state roads that are shorter than one mile (1.6 km) long in the state. The shortest, NM 446, is a quarter-mile (402 m) long and serves to connect Valmora to NM 97. NM 597, the second shortest highway, links U.S. Route 160 (US 160) to the Four Corners Monument, a tourist destination on the Navajo Nation where the states of Utah, Arizona, New Mexico, and Colorado meet. In comparison, the longest state road in New Mexico is NM 120, 119.031 miles (191.562 km) long, which is more than 475 times longer than the shortest state road.

== Route log ==
| Number | Length (mi) | Length (km) | Southern or western terminus | Northern or eastern terminus | Formed | Removed | Notes |
|---|---|---|---|---|---|---|---|
| NM 1 | — | — | US 85 (now I-25) near Socorro | US 85 (now I-25) near Belen | 1903 | 1930 | Became part of rerouted US 85 when the road was improved |
| NM 1 | 61.26 | 98.59 | I-25 near Truth or Consequences | I-25 Bus. in Socorro | — | — | Portion of the old US 85; which was functionally bypassed by I-25 |
| NM 2 | — | — | Texas state line near Malaga | Colorado state line near Chama | 1909 | 1937 | Became US 285 in 1934; roads were concurrent for a few years |
| NM 2 | 32.859 | 52.881 | US 285 near Artesia | US 285 near Roswell | 1950 | current | In the 1988 renumbering, one section became NM 256; the spur north of there became just plain NM 2. |
| NM 3 | 72.401 | 116.518 | US 54 in Duran | I-25 near Villanueva | 1909 | current | In the 1988 renumbering, the sections north of Villanueva were renumbered as NM 518 and NM 522. |
| NM 4 | — | — | US 80/NM 42 in Lordsburg | US 80/US 85/NM 1 in Las Cruces | 1909 | 1927 | Original highway between Arizona and Las Cruces. Truncated to Lordsburg circa 1923. Decommissioned in favor of US 80 in 1927. |
| NM 4 | 67.946 | 109.348 | US 550 in San Ysidro | NM 502 near Los Alamos | — | — | In the 1988 renumbering, NM 4 BL was renumbered as NM 501 (which extended north on roads previously not a state highway) and part of NM 502, and the section of NM 4 east of NM 4 BL was renumbered as part of NM 502 and NM 503. |
| NM 5 | — | — | Santa Clara Indian Reservation | US 84/US 285 in Española | 1927 | 1988 | Partially replaced by NM 30; rest now Indian Route 601 |
| NM 6 | — | — | US 66 near Mesita | US 66 near Santa Rosa | 1927 | 1937 | Replaced by US 66 in 1937 and later I-40. Reassigned on old US 66 to form the current route. |
| NM 6 | 36.360 | 58.516 | I-40 near Correro | NM 47 near Los Lunas | 1937 | current | In the 1988 renumbering, the section concurrent with US 85 (NM 314 after the renumbering) was dropped, and section from US 85 to NM 47 was renumbered as NM 309, and the section east of NM 47 became part of rerouted NM 47 (old route of NM 47 became NM 304). It was instead rerouted over NM 49 to NM 47. |
| NM 7 | — | — | NM 44 (now US 550) in San Ysidro | North of Jemez | 1927 | 1929 | Became an extension of NM 4 |
| NM 7 | 7.199 | 11.586 | US 62/US 180 in Whites City | Carlsbad Caverns National Park | 1929 | current | |
| NM 8 | 15 | 24 | NM 176 near Eunice | US 62/US 180 near Hobbs | — | — | Section north of near Hobbs renumbered as an extension of NM 529 and as NM 238 in the 1988 renumbering. Section east to NM 207 transferred to NM 176 (its designation before the 1988 renumbering) in May 2006. |
| NM 9 | — | — | US 85 in Santo Domingo | NM 41 in Galisteo | — | 1946 | Became part of NM 22 |
| NM 9 | 109.154 | 175.666 | NM 80 near Rodeo | CR A003 at the Luna–Doña Ana county line | — | — | |
| NM 10 | — | — | US 54 near Carrizozo | US 85 in Santa Fe | 1927 | 1968 | Renumbered NM 14 to avoid confusion with I-10 |
| NM 11 | 34.119 | 54.909 | MX 2 spur at Mexico – U.S. border | Florida Street in Deming | 1927 | current | International crossing at Columbus Port of Entry |
| NM 12 | 74.297 | 119.569 | US 180 | US 60 in Datil | 1927 | current | |
| NM 13 | 36.002 | 57.940 | US 82 near Artesia | US 285 near Roswell | 1927 | current | |
| NM 14 | — | — | SR 86 at Arizona state line | US 80 in Road Forks | 1927 | 1960 | NM 14 and SR 86 in Arizona provided a more direct route to US 80 in Benson, Arizona. Route was replaced by I-10 in 1960. |
| NM 14 | 53.957 | 86.835 | NM 333 in Tijeras | US 84/US 285 in Santa Fe | 1968 | current | Formerly numbered NM 10; Section south of Tijeras renumbered NM 337 and as an extension of NM 55 in the 1988 renumbering. |
| NM 15 | — | — | NM 10 in Tajique | NM 41 in Estancia | 1927 | 1944 | renumbered to NM 55; went down to Gran Quivira until 1946, when this section was replaced by an extension of NM 10 (now NM 14) |
| NM 15 | 44.314 | 71.316 | US 180 in Silver City | Gila Cliff Dwellings | 1968 | current | Formerly numbered as part of NM 25 and NM 527 |
| NM 16 | — | — | US 62 near Hobbs | Texas state line E of Hobbs | 1927 | 1943 | Became a portion of US 180 |
| NM 16 | — | — | US 64 in Farmington | Farmington Airport | 1943 | 1980 | |
| NM 16 | 10.500 | 16.898 | NM 22 near Pena Blanca | I-25 | 1988 | current | Renumbered from part of NM 22 in the 1988 renumbering. |
| NM 17 | 9.590 | 15.434 | US 64/US 84 in Chama | SH 17 at the Colorado state line | — | — | |
| NM 18 | 72.117 | 116.061 | SH 18 at Texas state line | US 82/NM 83 in Lovington | — | — | Sections renumbered NM 206, NM 209, NM 402, and NM 406 in the 1988 renumbering. NM 18 BL renumbered NM 207 and NM 18 BYP renumbered NM 208. |
| NM 19 | — | — | US 666 (now US 491) in Shiprock | SH 19 near Cedar Hill | 1927 | 1940 | was cosigned with US 550 for a few years until cancellation because of it |
| NM 19 | — | — | US 84 in Chama | SH 17 near Chama | 1940 | 1956 | transferred to NM 17 |
| NM 19 | 10.257 | 16.507 | NM 209 near Broadview | FM 2013 at the Texas state line | 1968 | current | |
| NM 20 | 45.906 | 73.879 | US 285 near Roswell | US 60 near Fort Sumner | c. 1930 | current | |
| NM 21 | 34.447 | 55.437 | US 64 in Cimarron | I-25 Bus. in Springer | — | — | rerouted east over NM 199 in the 1988 renumbering; old route renumbered as NM 442 and rest removed from the state highway system. |
| NM 22 | 13.941 | 22.436 | I-25 near Santo Domingo | Cochiti Pueblo | c. 1930 | current | messiest state highway before the 1988 renumbering; sections were renumbered as NM 16, NM 301, NM 586, NM 587, NM 588, NM 589, NM 590, NM 591, NM 592, and an extension of NM 475. |
| NM 23 | — | — | NM 3 (now US 54) in Duran | US 70 (now US 60) in Encino | 1927 | 1930 | Became a reroute of NM 3 |
| NM 23 | — | — | NM 124 | Acoma Pueblo | 1930 | 1990 | Removed south of I-40 in 1988; now Indian Route 23 |
| NM 24 | 50.023 | 80.504 | NM 130 near Cloudcroft | US 82 near Hope | — | — | Section north of Cloudcroft became an extension of NM 130 and north of there was renumbered as NM 244 in the 1988 renumbering. |
| NM 25 | — | — | US 180 in Silver City | NM 61 in Mimbres | — | 1968 | Originally started from Red Rock to west of Silver City; extended and truncated; renumbered as NM 15 and NM 35 to avoid conflict with I-25. |
| NM 26 | 47.862 | 77.026 | US 180 near Deming | I-25 near Hatch | 1905 | current | |
| NM 27 | 30.200 | 48.602 | NM 26 in Nutt | NM 152 in Hillsboro | 1905 | current | |
| NM 28 | 30.346 | 48.837 | FM 259 at Texas state line | NM 478 in Las Cruces | 1905 | current | section north of Las Cruces renumbered as NM 157 and NM 158 in the 1988 renumbering and rest eliminated. |
| NM 29 | — | — | NM 30 in Villanueva | US 85 (now I-25) near Las Vegas | 1927 | 1930 | Became part of NM 3 |
| NM 29 | — | — | NM 3 in Duran | US 60 in Vaughn | 1930 | 1940 | Cosigned with US 54 for a few years |
| NM 29 | 1.050 | 1.690 | NM 17 in Chama | Edward Sargent Wildlife Area | — | — | |
| NM 30 | — | — | US 85 in San Jose | US 66 (now US 84) in Anton Chico | 1927 | 1944 | one portion transferred to NM 3 |
| NM 30 | 8.949 | 14.402 | NM 502 near Pojoaque | US 84/US 285 in Española | — | — | |
| NM 31 | 22.676 | 36.493 | US 285 near Loving | US 62/US 180 near Carlsbad | — | — | Section north of Carlsbad renumbered as an extension of NM 360, county road 222, and NM 249 in the 1988 renumbering |
| NM 32 | 41.323 | 66.503 | NM 12 in Apache Creek | US 60 in Quemado | — | — | Section north of Quemado renumbered as NM 601, a reroute of NM 36, and NM 602 in the 1988 renumbering. NM 32's old route in Gallup renumbered NM 610. NM 32 Loop renumbered NM 615. |
| NM 33 | — | — | US 366 (now US 70) in Alamogordo | NM 34 (now NM 24) near Elk | 1927 | 1930 | Became part of NM 83 (now US 82). |
| NM 33 | — | — | US 70 near White Sands | NM 83 (now US 82) near Elk | 1930 | 1947 | Part became part of NM 24 and rest removed from system; this section was later restored as NM 506 |
| NM 33 | — | — | NM 502 | County Road 84 | 1988 | 1990 | former NM 4 Spur; now county road 84D |
| NM 34 | — | — | NM 18 in Lovington | Texas border east of Lovington | 1927 | 1947 | Became part of rerouted NM 83. |
| NM 34 | 20.200 | 32.509 | Clines Corners | Rowe | — | — | Section in Santa Fe county eliminated in 1990. |
| NM 35 | — | — | US 66 in Thoreau | Colorado border north of Farmington | 1927 | 1946 | Later north end truncated to US 550 (now US 64) as north part became part of NM 17; rest became part of NM 56 south of it and rest was removed from the state highway system |
| NM 35 | — | — | NM 41 in Galisteo | Cerro Pelon | 1947 | 1960 | |
| NM 35 | 27.520 | 44.289 | NM 152 in San Lorenzo | NM 15 | 1968 | current | Formerly numbered as part of NM 25; one section was part of NM 61 before its truncation |
| NM 36 | 72.220 | 116.227 | US 60 in Quemado | NM 53 | — | — | section southeast to Pie Town renumbered as NM 603 in the 1988 renumbering. Rerouted over part of NM 117 there. Also, the section from Zuni south was eliminated and the section from NM 53 to NM 32 (now NM 602) was renumbered as NM 604 (which was eliminated just a little later), and it was instead rerouted over part of NM 32 to Ramah. |
| NM 37 | 14.162 | 22.792 | NM 48 | US 380 | — | — | The section south of NM 48 became an extension of NM 48 in the 1988 renumbering. |
| NM 38 | 29.266 | 47.099 | NM 522 in Questa | US 64 in Eagle Nest | — | — | The section south of Eagle Nest renumbered NM 434 in the 1988 renumbering. |
| NM 39 | 93.712 | 150.815 | US 54 in Logan | US 56/US 412 in Abbot | — | — | The section south of Logan renumbered NM 469 in the 1988 renumbering. |
| NM 40 | — | — | NM 24 in Weed | NM 34 (now NM 24) in Dunken | 1927 | 1944 | Removed from system |
| NM 40 | — | — | NM 18 (now NM 209) near Broadview | NM 108 near Hollene | — | 1968 | Renumbered NM 19 to avoid confusion with I-40 |
| NM 41 | 62.02 | 99.81 | US 60 in Willard | US 285 in Lamy | — | — | |
| NM 42 | 35.542 | 57.199 | US 54 in Corona | US 60 in Willard | — | — | section from Corona to US 285 renumbered NM 247 in the 1988 renumbering and section from US 285 to US 60 eliminated. |
| NM 43 | — | — | NM 18 near Broadview | NM 108 near Hollene | 1927 | 1932 | Removed from system; later became part of an extended NM 24 and in the 1988 renumbering, became NM 244. |
| NM 43 | — | — | NM 2 in Lake Arthur | NM 31 near Hagerman | 1932 | 1947 | |
| NM 43 | — | — | NM 44 near La Ventana | NM 44 near La Ventana | — | 1990 | Short spur of NM 44. |
| NM 44 | — | — | I-25 near Bernalillo | US 64 near Bloomfield | 1927 | 2000 | Section east of I-25 renumbered as NM 165 and an extension of NM 536 on October 24, 1985. Section north of US 64 renumbered NM 544 in the 1988 renumbering. Both NM 44 and NM 544 became part of rerouted US 550. |
| NM 45 | — | — | Placitas | NM 10 near Cedar Crest | — | 1940 | Became part of NM 44 (now NM 165 and part of NM 536) |
| NM 45 | 12.670 | 20.390 | NM 314 in Isleta Pueblo | NM 528 in Albuquerque | — | — | |
| NM 46 | — | — | I-25 in Alameda | NM 44 (now US 550) near Corrales | — | 1988 | Became part of extended NM 448 and extended NM 528 in the 1988 renumbering. |
| NM 47 | 59.644 | 95.988 | US 60 | NM 556 in Albuquerque | — | — | In the 1988 renumbering, the section along Prosperity Avenue was removed from the state highway system and the section along 2nd Street was renumbered as NM 303. It was instead rerouted along NM 361 and the east-west section of NM 98. Also, it was rerouted southeast over a former section of NM 6, while the old route was renumbered as NM 304. |
| NM 48 | 22.140 | 35.631 | US 70 in Hollywood | US 380 in Capitan | — | — | Extended south over section of NM 37 in the 1988 renumbering. Section north of Capitan renumbered NM 246. |
| NM 49 | — | — | I-25 in Belen | NM 47 in Valencia | — | 1988 | Became part of rerouted NM 6 in the 1988 renumbering. |
| NM 50 | — | — | NM 83 in Elk | US 70 in Picacho | 1927 | 1944 | |
| NM 50 | 6.028 | 9.701 | I-25/US 84/US 85 in Glorieta | NM 63/NM 223 in Pecos | — | — | |
| NM 51 | — | — | NM 18 north of Claud | Hollene | — | 1944 | |
| NM 51 | 17.857 | 28.738 | I-25 Bus. in Truth or Consequences | Engle | — | — | Extended east from what is now NM 177 over part of NM 52 in the 1988 renumbering. |
| NM 52 | 88.596 | 142.581 | NM 181 near Truth or Consequences | US 60 near Magdalena | — | — | Section north of current intersection with CR 549 became NM 168 and north of there was renumbered as NM 169 in the 1988 renumbering. Rerouted on a new route and part of NM 78 to Magdalena. Section east of Truth or Consequences renumbered as NM 195, NM 177 (which was newly designated on old 51), and an extension of NM 51. |
| NM 53 | 86.002 | 138.407 | SR 61 at the Arizona state line | NM 122 in Grants | — | — | Section northeast of Grants renumbered NM 605 in the 1988 renumbering. |
| NM 54 | — | — | Inscription Rock | Hospah | 1927 | 1930 | Renumbered to NM 53 to avoid confusion with US 54 |
| NM 55 | — | — | NM 44 near Cuba | US 550 in Aztec | 1927 | 1944 | Became part of rerouted NM 44 when the old route of NM 44 was removed from the state highway system. |
| NM 55 | 96.844 | 155.855 | US 54 near Ancho | NM 41 in Estancia | 1944 | current | renumbered from NM 15 because the road was shorter; extended west over part of NM 14 in the 1988 renumbering. |
| NM 56 | — | — | NM 53 near Ice Cave | NM 44 (now US 550) in Blanco Trading Post | 1927 | 1968 | renumbered NM 57 to avoid conflict with US 56 |
| NM 57 | — | — | NM 120 near Yates | NM 18 near Amistad | 1927 | 1958 | Section west of Bueyeros removed and section east of Bueyeros became part of NM 102 |
| NM 57 | 27.640 | 44.482 | US 550 | San Juan–McKinley county line | 1968 | current | Section south of County Line now Indian Route 14, Indian Route 9, and NM 371. Section south of there renumbered NM 606 and south of there eliminated in the 1988 renumbering. NM 57 Spur renumbered NM 612 in the 1988 renumbering. |
| NM 58 | 18.909 | 30.431 | US 64 | I-25 | — | — | |
| NM 59 | — | — | US 85 in Maxwell | US 87 in Mount Dora | 1927 | 1944 | Eastern half later restored as NM 426. |
| NM 59 | 31.089 | 50.033 | NM 52 | Beaverhead | — | — | |
| NM 60 | — | — | NM 18 in Jenkins | US 366 in Elida | 1927 | 1932 | Renumbered NM 90 to avoid conflict with US 60 |
| NM 61 | 25.024 | 40.272 | US 180 | NM 152 | — | — | section north of Silver City transferred to NM 35 and north of there removed from the state highway system. |
| NM 62 | — | — | NM 38 (now NM 434) in Black Lake | NM 58 (now US 56) near Gladstone | 1927 | 1932 | renumbered NM 120 to avoid conflict with US 62 |
| NM 63 | 25.146 | 40.469 | I-25/US 84/US 85 in Rowe | Cowles | — | — | |
| NM 65 | 15.505 | 24.953 | NM 329 in Las Vegas | El Porvenir | — | — | Section northeast of Las Vegas renumbered as NM 419, an extension of NM 102, and NM 420 in the 1988 renumbering. |
| NM 67 | — | — | La Liendre | NM 104 near Las Vegas | — | 2004 | Originally went from El Porvenir to Newkirk. Rerouted on current NM 104 west to NM 65 in 1946. Swapped designations with NM 104 (this was originally part of NM 20) in 1947. |
| NM 68 | — | — | Arizona state line | US 666 (now US 491) near Ya-ta-hey | — | 1966 | Renumbered NM 264 to match Arizona |
| NM 68 | 45.513 | 73.246 | US 84/US 285 in Española | US 64 in Taos | — | — | The two NM 68 Spurs was renumbered NM 584 and NM 585 in the 1988 renumbering. |
| NM 69 | — | — | I-40 in Cuervo | NM 104 in Variadero | — | 1988 | south of county line removed by 1983 as it became a private ranch road; northern half now county routes C58B and C58D |
| NM 71 | — | — | US 85 in San Felipe Pueblo | US 85 in San Jose | 1927 | 1932 | Removed from system |
| NM 71 | — | — | NM 329 in Las Vegas | San Antonio | — | 1988 | Removed from system |
| NM 72 | 36.001 | 57.938 | I-25 in Raton | NM 456 in Folsom | — | — | Section east of Folsom renumbered as part of rerouted NM 325 in the 1988 renumbering. |
| NM 73 | — | — | US 64 (now NM 456) near Folsom | Colorado state line | 1927 | 1940 | restored as NM 551 in 1960 |
| NM 73 | 2.688 | 4.326 | NM 75 in Peñasco | Llano | — | — | NM 73 spur was renumbered NM 579 in the 1988 renumbering. |
| NM 74 | 4.755 | 7.652 | NM 68 in Ohkay Owingeh | US 84/US 285 in El Duende | — | — | |
| NM 75 | 20.547 | 33.067 | NM 68 near Dixon | NM 518 near Sipapu Ski Area | — | — | NM 75 Spur was renumbered NM 588 in the 1988 renumbering. |
| NM 76 | 29.805 | 47.966 | NM 68 in Santa Cruz | NM 75 in Picuris Pueblo | — | — | |
| NM 77 | 12.559 | 20.212 | NM 209 near Clovis | FM 2290 at New Mexico–Texas state line | — | — | |
| NM 78 | 15.213 | 24.483 | SR 78 at Arizona state line | US 180 near Buckhorn | — | — | Section east of Buckhorn renumbered as NM 159, NM 163, and a rerouted NM 52. |
| NM 79 | — | — | U.S. Route 66 in Montoya | NM 156 in Ima | 1927 | 1945 | |
| NM 79 | — | — | Cloverdale | NM 81 near Antelope Wells | — | 1980 | Possibly continued to the Mexican border in the 1950s; now a private road |
| NM 79 | — | — | NM 502 | County Road 84 | 1988 | 1990 | former NM 4 Spur; now county road 101E |
| NM 80 | 32.416 | 52.168 | SR 80 at Arizona state line | I-10 in Road Forks | — | — | Follows former routing of U.S. Route 80 through the Bootheel of New Mexico |
| NM 81 | 45.800 | 73.708 | Local road to MX 2 at Mexican border | NM 9 in Hachita | — | — | International crossing at Antelope Wells Port of Entry; section north of Hachita renumbered NM 146 in the 1988 renumbering. |
| NM 82 | — | — | Arizona state line | US 70 near Virden | 1927 | 1968 | Renumbered to NM 92 to avoid conflict with US 82 |
| NM 83 | 12.911 | 20.778 | US 82/NM 18 in Lovington | NM 132 north of Hobbs | — | — | Section east of NM 132 became part of NM 132 in the 1988 renumbering. |
| NM 84 | — | — | NM 21 in Rayado | US 85 in Springer | — | 1938 | Renumbered NM 199 to avoid confusion with US 84 |
| NM 86 | — | — | US 60/US 84 in Tolar | NM 18 (now NM 209) in Ragland | 1927 | 1988 | North section became part of NM 252 and NM 89 in the 1988 renumbering; south section eliminated. |
| NM 87 | — | — | NM 18 near Grady | US 66 near Tucumcari | 1927 | 1935 | Renumbered as an extension of NM 88 (now part of NM 268) to avoid confusion with US 87 |
| NM 88 | 21.486 | 34.578 | US 70 in Portales | FM 746 at Texas state line | — | — | Section west and north of Portales renumbered as NM 267, NM 268, and NM 278 in the 1988 renumbering. |
| NM 89 | 19.788 | 31.846 | NM 252 in House | NM 268 near Melrose | — | — | Section east of Melrose renubmered as NM 288 in the 1988 renumbering. |
| NM 90 | — | — | NM 17 in Lumberton | Colorado state line | 1927 | 1932 | Renumbered NM 106 so that NM 90 could renumber NM 60 |
| NM 90 | — | — | NM 18 in Crossroads | US 60 in Elida | 1932 | 1956 | |
| NM 90 | 42.770 | 68.832 | US 70 near Lordsburg | US 180 in Silver City | c. 1961 | current | Section east of Silver City renumbered NM 152 in the 1988 renumbering. |
| NM 91 | 12.619 | 20.308 | I-40 Bus./US 54 in Santa Rosa | Near Puerto de Luna | — | — | |
| NM 92 | — | — | US 70 in Elida | SH 116 at Texas state line | 1927 | 1955 | Renumbered NM 116 to match Texas; now NM 114 |
| NM 92 | 11.168 | 17.973 | Virden Highway at Arizona state line | US 70 near Virden | — | — | |
| NM 93 | — | — | NM 60 in Eagle Hill | NM 18 in Milnesand | 1927 | 1930 | |
| NM 93 | 16.448 | 26.470 | I-40/NM 392 near Endee | Curry–Quay county line | — | — | Section west of Bellview transferred to NM 241 in the 1988 renumbering. Section south of the County Line eliminated. |
| NM 94 | 18.630 | 29.982 | NM 518 in Sapello | NM 518 in Mora | — | — | |
| NM 95 | 13.415 | 21.589 | US 64/US 84 in Los Ojos | Heron Dam | — | — | Section south of Heron Dam eliminated in the 1988 renumbering and part renumbered NM 595. |
| NM 96 | 48.989 | 78.840 | US 550 near Cuba | US 84 near Abiquiu Reservoir | — | — | Section east of Abiquiu lake renumbered as NM 554, NM 567, and NM 570 in the 1988 renumbering. |
| NM 97 | 9.650 | 15.530 | NM 161 in Watrous | Near Valmora | — | — | |
| NM 98 | — | — | NM 44 in Haynes | NM 124 in Haynes | 1927 | 1946 | |
| NM 98 | — | — | NM 47 in Albuquerque | US 85 Alt./NM 47 in Albuquerque | 1960 | 1990 | East-west section along Menaul Blvd transferred to NM 47 in the 1988 renumbering. Rest eliminated shortly after. |
| NM 99 | — | — | Central Avenue (US 66) in Albuquerque | University of New Mexico | — | 1988 | |
| NM 100 | — | — | NM 96 in El Rito, Rio Arriba County | NM 111 in Vallecitos | — | 1982 | originally went further west on current NM 110; northern section restored in 1988 as NM 576 |
| NM 100 | — | — | NM 502 | County Road 84 | 1988 | 1990 | former NM 4 Spur; now county road 101G |
| NM 101 | 1.420 | 2.285 | NM 28 in Mesilla | NM 478 in Las Cruces | 1940 | current | |
| NM 102 | 46.318 | 74.542 | NM 39 near Mosquero | NM 402 near Amistad | — | — | Section east of Amistad renumbered NM 421 in the 1988 renumbering. Extended west over part of truncated NM 65 (section east of there now NM 420). |
| NM 103 | — | — | NM 65 in El Porvenir | US 85 in Las Vegas | 1927 | 1946 | |
| NM 103 | 3.900 | 6.276 | NM 32 near Quemado | Quemado | — | — | |
| NM 104 | 106.897 | 172.034 | I-25 Bus. in Las Vegas | I-40 Bus./NM 209 in Tucumcari | — | — | Current route became part of NM 67 in 1944. Reassigned to section of NM 20 in 1946. Swapped designations with NM 67 in 1947. Parts were cosigned with NM 65 and NM 129 until 1988. |
| NM 105 | 9.100 | 14.645 | NM 94 near Tierra Monte | Rociada | — | — | |
| NM 106 | — | — | Lumberton | Colorado State Line | — | 1943 | decommissioned due to US 84 extension |
| NM 106 | 0.752 | 1.210 | Española | Santa Cruz | — | — | Section north of Española renumbered NM 583 in the 1988 renumbering. |
| NM 107 | 41.722 | 67.145 | Magdalena | Magdalena | — | — | |
| NM 108 | 23.380 | 37.626 | Texico | NM 19 | — | — | |
| NM 109 | 7.757 | 12.484 | Bosque | Belen | — | — | |
| NM 110 | 3.798 | 6.112 | FR 559 | El Rito | — | — | Originally went north on current NM 111 and on an unnumbered road from Canyon Plaza to Tres Piedras. |
| NM 111 | 19.519 | 31.413 | Ojo Caliente | Canon Plaza | — | — | Originally went along current NM 519 and southeast to Arroyo Hondo |
| NM 112 | 44.755 | 72.026 | Regina | Los Ojos | — | — | |
| NM 113 | — | — | US 85 in Socorro | New Mexico Institute of Mining and Technology | — | 1980 | |
| NM 113 | 20.647 | 33.228 | NM 9 near Playas | I-10 near Ulmoris | — | — | |
| NM 114 | — | — | Johns Canyon | NM 94 in Sapello | — | 1946 | later restored as NM 266 |
| NM 114 | — | — | Kelly | US 60 in Magdalena | — | 1970 | Removed from system |
| NM 114 | 47.054 | 75.726 | US 70 in Elida | SH 114 at Texas state line | — | — | |
| NM 115 | — | — | US 85 in Pecos | Cow Creek | — | 1944 | later restored as NM 223 |
| NM 115 | 3.457 | 5.564 | Cebolla | CR 455 | — | — | |
| NM 116 | — | — | NM 2 in Tesuque | Aspen Ranch | — | 1946 | became part of NM 22 |
| NM 116 | 47.054 | 75.726 | US 70 in Elida | SH 116 (now SH 114) at Texas state line | 1955 | 1977 | Renumbered to NM 114 when TX-116 was renumbered to TX-114 |
| NM 116 | 15.792 | 25.415 | Bernardo | Belen | — | — | formerly part of US 85 |
| NM 117 | 62.058 | 99.873 | Techado | Grants | — | — | Originally went from New Horse Springs to Techado; it was reassigned to current route by 1947. Section southwest of Techado became part of rerouted NM 36 in the 1988 renumbering. |
| NM 118 | — | — | US 85 in Santa Fe | New Mexico Capitol Building | — | 1966 | Originally continued to then-NM 9 near Santo Domingo until 1946, when this became part of NM 22 |
| NM 118 | 36.852 | 59.308 | Grant Road at Arizona state line | I-40 in Iyanbito | — | — | Historic routing of US 66 |
| NM 119 | 5.647 | 9.088 | Dilla | Chico | — | — | |
| NM 120 | 119.031 | 191.562 | Black Lakes | Gladstone | — | — | Longest state road in New Mexico; section north of Gladstone renumbered as NM 453 in the 1988 renumbering. |
| NM 121 | 8.581 | 13.810 | Mora | Chacon | — | — | |
| NM 122 | — | — | US 66 in Laguna | US 66 in Rio Puerco | — | 1958 | western half replaced by NM 279 |
| NM 122 | 36.740 | 59.127 | I-40 in Continental Divide | I-40 in Grants | — | — | Historic routing of US 66 |
| NM 123 | — | — | NM 3 near La Cueva | US 85 near Watrous | — | 1944 | now partly NM 161 |
| NM 123 | — | — | US 285 in Santa Fe | NM 14 in Santa Fe | — | 2000 | Guadalupe Street |
| NM 124 | — | — | west of Pounds Mill | NM 95 at Heron Reservoir | — | 1946 | had a spur north to Dulce |
| NM 124 | 25.523 | 41.075 | NM 117 southeast of Grants | I-40 east of Laguna | — | — | Historic routing of US 66 |
| NM 125 | — | — | Lyden | US 64 east of Lyden | — | 1946 | |
| NM 125 | 25.412 | 40.897 | US 380 near Tatum | SH 125 at Texas state line | — | — | Former NM 294 |
| NM 126 | 39.654 | 63.817 | Cuba | Jemez Springs | — | — | |
| NM 127 | — | — | US 60 in Salt Lake | US 60 in Quemado | — | 1941 | part became part of NM 32 (now NM 601); rest eliminated from system |
| NM 127 | 3.530 | 5.681 | Eagle Nest | Idlewood | — | — | |
| NM 128 | — | — | US 66 in Albuquerque | US 85 in Alameda | — | 1945 | Became part of NM 47 |
| NM 128 | 59.979 | 96.527 | NM 31 near Loving | SH 128 at Texas state line | — | — | Former NM 256 |
| NM 129 | 17.383 | 27.975 | Newkirk | Mesa Rica | — | — | Section north of Mesa Rica was cosigned with NM 104 until the 1988 renumbering. |
| NM 130 | 21.872 | 35.200 | Cloudcroft | Mayhill | — | — | Extended west over section of NM 24 in the 1988 renumbering |
| NM 131 | — | — | NM 18 in Hobbs | Texas state line E of Hobbs | — | 1948 | replaced by extension of NM 132, now NM 218 |
| NM 131 | 2.401 | 3.864 | Manzano | Manzano Mountains State Park | 1988 | current | |
| NM 132 | 19.760 | 31.801 | NM 18/NM 218 in Hobbs | SH 83 at Texas state line | — | — | Replaced section of NM 83 in the 1988 renumbering. Section from NM 18 east renumbered NM 218. |
| NM 133 | 3.600 | 5.794 | NM 132 near Knowles | FM 1757 at Texas state line | — | — | |
| NM 134 | — | — | US 70 in Las Cruces | US 85 (now I-25) in Fort Selden | — | 1944 | became part of NM 28 |
| NM 134 | 22.470 | 36.162 | Sheep Springs | McKinley–San Juan county line | — | — | |
| NM 135 | — | — | US 66 (now Central Ave.) near Albuquerque | US 85 (now NM 314) near Albuquerque | — | 1969 | Bridge Blvd. |
| NM 136 | — | — | NM 17 near Chama | Colorado state line | — | 1943 | became part of US 84 |
| NM 136 | 9.157 | 14.737 | MX 2 spur at Mexican border | SH 178 at Texas state line | 1988 | current | International crossing at Santa Teresa Port of Entry |
| NM 137 | 55.007 | 88.525 | Texas state line (north entrance to Guadalupe Mountains National Park) | US 285 near Seven Rivers | — | — | |
| NM 138 | — | — | NM 27 in Lake Valley | NM 61 in Sherman | — | 1947 | Had two sections |
| NM 138 | 0.670 | 1.078 | Las Cruces | Las Cruces | 1988 | current | Renumbered from NM 342 Spur in the 1988 renumbering. |
| NM 139 | — | — | NM 185 in Las Cruces | US 70 in Las Cruces | 1988 | 2001 | Renumbered from part of NM 292 in the 1988 renumbering. |
| NM 140 | 2.828 | 4.551 | Hatch | Rincon | — | — | Section west of Hatch renumbered NM 154 in the 1988 renumbering. Rerouted on a former spur. |
| NM 141 | — | — | NM 52 and NM 140 in Engel | US 54 in Oscuro | — | 1947 | decommissioned due to extension of White Sands Missile Range |
| NM 141 | — | — | NM 11 near Deming | NM 143 near Rockhound State Park | 1988 | 2003 | |
| NM 142 | 10.088 | 16.235 | Truth or Consequences | Placitas | — | — | |
| NM 143 | — | — | NM 52 in Cuchillo | US 85 near Williamsburg | — | 1949 | |
| NM 143 | 6.147 | 9.893 | — | Rockhound State Park | 1988 | current | |
| NM 144 | 1.230 | 1.979 | Las Vegas | Camp Luna Technical-Vocational Institute | — | — | |
| NM 145 | — | — | NM 184 near Black Spring | NM 52 | — | 1942 | became part of NM 78 |
| NM 145 | 3.500 | 5.633 | NM 80 | NM 338 near Cotton City | — | — | |
| NM 146 | — | — | NM 41 near Robsart | US 60 in Scholle | — | 1947 | |
| NM 146 | 19.157 | 30.830 | Hachita | Separ | 1988 | current | Renumbered from part of NM 81 in the 1988 renumbering. |
| NM 147 | 1.070 | 1.722 | Isleta Pueblo | Isleta Pueblo | — | — | |
| NM 148 | — | — | NM 32 in Atarque | Arizona Border | — | 1947 | |
| NM 148 | — | — | County Road C030 near Deming | east of NM 11 near Deming | 1988 | 2003 | renumbered from part of NM 497 and NM 497 spur in the 1988 renumbering. |
| NM 149 | — | — | Arizona state line | NM 57 south of Farmington | — | 1947 | |
| NM 149 | — | — | I-25 in Socorro | NM 439 Socorro | 1988 | — | renumbered from NM 439 spur in the 1988 renumbering |
| NM 150 | 14.547 | 23.411 | Taos | Taos Ski Valley | — | — | Section east of Taos Ski Valley now impassable; passable section renumbered NM 578 in the 1988 renumbering. |
| NM 151 | — | — | NM 58 in Taylor Springs | NM 39 in Mills | — | 1947 | |
| NM 151 | — | — | County Road C027 | NM 517 | 1988 | 1990 | renumbered from NM 517 spur in the 1988 renumbering |
| NM 152 | — | — | NM 21 in Lucero | US 85 in Wagon Mound | — | 1947 | |
| NM 152 | 66.067 | 106.325 | Santa Clara | Caballo | 1988 | current | Renumbered from part of NM 90 in the 1988 renumbering. |
| NM 153 | — | — | NM 4 in Cundiyo | NM 76 in Chimayo | — | 1940 | Later restored as NM 520 |
| NM 153 | 3.752 | 6.038 | Gila | Gila | 1988 | current | Renumbered from part of NM 293 in the 1988 renumbering. |
| NM 154 | — | — | NM 65 in Rosebud | NM 18 south of Sedan | — | 1947 | |
| NM 154 | 4.189 | 6.742 | Hatch | Rincon | 1988 | current | Renumbered from part of NM 140 in the 1988 renumbering. |
| NM 155 | — | — | Ute Reservoir | US 54 | — | 1988 | The second section on the other side of the reservoir to NM 39 was deleted by 1983. |
| NM 156 | 60.603 | 97.531 | Santa Rosa | Ragland | — | — | |
| NM 157 | 1.740 | 2.800 | Radium Springs | Radium Springs | 1988 | current | renumbered from part of NM 28 in the 1988 renumbering. |
| NM 158 | — | — | NM 86 in House | NM 88 north of Melrose | — | 1947 | Became part of rerouted NM 89; old NM 89 was removed from the system. |
| NM 158 | 0.900 | 1.448 | Hill | Hill | 1988 | current | renumbered from part of NM 28 in the 1988 renumbering. |
| NM 159 | — | — | NM 89 east of House | NM 86 southwest of Ragland Hill | — | 1947 | |
| NM 159 | 30.550 | 49.165 | Alma | Willow Creek | 1988 | current | renumbered from part of NM 78 in the 1988 renumbering. |
| NM 160 | — | — | NM 3 (now NM 518) near Buena Vista | US 85 near Watrous | — | 1970 | renumbered in 1970 to avoid confusion with US 160 |
| NM 161 | — | — | US 380 in Bingham | NM 15 near Claunch | — | 1942 | became an extension of NM 41 |
| NM 161 | 31.902 | 51.341 | La Cueva | Fort Union National Monument | — | — | extended northwest over NM 477 in the 1988 renumbering. |
| NM 162 | 2.600 | 4.184 | Tierra Amarilla | Tierra Amarilla | — | — | Section northeast of Tierra Amarilla renumbered NM 573 in the 1988 renumbering. Rerouted over section of NM 531 instead. |
| NM 163 | — | — | Atarque | NM 39 in Logan | — | 1947 | |
| NM 163 | 40.100 | 64.535 | Former NM 61 | NM 52 | 1988 | current | Renumbered from part of NM 78 in the 1988 renumbering. |
| NM 164 | — | — | US 66 in Church Rock | Crownpoint | — | 1946 | Became NM 56 and NM 57; now the southern end of NM 371 |
| NM 165 | — | — | NM 148/NM 182 in Atarque | NM 36/NM 176 in Zuni Pueblo | — | 1946 | became part of NM 36 |
| NM 165 | 16.754 | 26.963 | NM 120 in Bernalillo | Sandia Ski Basin | — | — | Was part of NM 44 until October 24, 1985. |
| NM 166 | — | — | NM 120 in Bernalillo | US 64 east of Folsom | — | 1946 | |
| NM 166 | 1.900 | 3.058 | NM 52 near Magdalena | VLA Visitor Center near Magdalena | 1988 | current | Renumbered from NM 78 Spur in the 1988 renumbering, and former routing of US 60 before that. |
| NM 167 | — | — | NM 47 in Bosque Farms | NM 47 in Bosque Farms | — | 1990 | |
| NM 168 | — | — | US 82 west of Artesia | NM 13 north of Hope | — | 1947 | |
| NM 168 | — | — | NM 52 southwest of Magdalena | US 60 west of Magdalena | 1988 | 2001 | Renumbered from part of NM 52 in the 1988 renumbering. |
| NM 169 | — | — | NM 146 west of Rayo Hills | US 60 west of Scholle | — | 1946 | |
| NM 169 | 35.700 | 57.454 | Magdalena | Alamo | 1988 | current | Renumbered from part of NM 52 in the 1988 renumbering. |
| NM 170 | 19.599 | 31.542 | US 64 near Farmington | SH 140 at Colorado state line | — | — | |
| NM 171 | — | — | NM 65 (now NM 420) | NM 57 in Buyeros | — | 1958 | became part of NM 102 as NM 57 had parts removed from the state highway system. |
| NM 171 | — | — | Truth or Consequences | Truth or Consequences | 1988 | 2014 | Newly added in the 1988 renumbering; given to the city of Elephant Butte |
| NM 172 | — | — | NM 45 (now NM 165) in Placitas | US 85 in Algodones | — | 1938 | |
| NM 172 | 28.189 | 45.366 | Maljamar | Roswell | — | — | |
| NM 173 | 18.057 | 29.060 | Aztec | Navajo Dam | — | — | Section northwest of Aztec renumbered as NM 574 in the 1988 renumbering. NM 173 Spur was renumbered as NM 575. |
| NM 174 | — | — | NM 53 near Paxton | US 66 (now I-40) near Grants | — | 1942 | became part of rerouted NM 53 |
| NM 174 | 5.000 | 8.047 | Glenwood | Mogollon | — | — | |
| NM 175 | — | — | NM 2 in Hernandez | US 64 (now I-40) in San Juan | — | 1944 | became part of rerouted US 285 |
| NM 175 | 1.600 | 2.575 | Eunice | Oil Center | — | — | |
| NM 176 | — | — | NM 36/NM 165 in Zuni Pueblo | NM 32 in Ramah | — | 1938 | became part of NM 53 |
| NM 176 | 28.488 | 45.847 | US 62/US 180/NM 243 near Carlsbad | SH 176 at Texas state line | — | — | Section east of Oil Center renumbered as an extension of NM 8, a previously concurrent part of NM 18 BL (renumbered NM 207), and NM 234 in the 1988 renumbering. Section west of Carlsbad renumbered NM 243. Reverted to its pre-1988 route (east only, not west) in May 2006, replacing part of NM 8, part of NM 207, and all of NM 234. The section of NM 207 north of NM 176 was renumbered as NM 248. |
| NM 177 | — | — | NM 165 near Zuni | NM 176 in Black Rock | — | 1938 | became part of NM 32 |
| NM 177 | 0.835 | 1.344 | NM 51 east of Truth or Consequences | NM 51 at Elephant Butte Dam | 1988 | current | Old routing of NM 51 and NM 52. Section east of now closed section of NM 195 renumbered from part of NM 52 in the 1988 renumbering and section from NM 51 to old NM 52 was newly added. |
| NM 178 | — | — | US 84 near Fort Sumner | NM 91 near Santa Rosa | — | 1947 | |
| NM 178 | — | — | I-25 near San Antonio | NM 1 near San Antonio | 1988 | 2003 | Renumbered from NM 1 Spur in the 1988 renumbering. |
| NM 179 | — | — | US 54 in Corona | US 285 near Ramon | — | 1944 | became part of NM 42 (now NM 247) |
| NM 179 | 2.050 | 3.299 | NM 51 east of Truth or Consequences | NM 195 at Elephant Butte Dam | — | — | |
| NM 180 | — | — | US 70 near Lordsburg | US 85 in Caballo | — | 1962 | renumbered to NM 90; one portion now NM 152 |
| NM 181 | — | — | US 60 east of Quemado | NM 117 near Pie Town | — | 1946 | |
| NM 181 | 11.820 | 19.022 | Truth or Consequences | Cuchillo | 1988 | current | Renumbered from part of U.S. Route 85 in the 1988 renumbering. |
| NM 182 | — | — | NM 127 in Salt Lake | NM 148/NM 165 in Salt Lake | — | 1941 | became part of NM 32 |
| NM 182 | 1.306 | 2.102 | La Union | La Union | — | — | Renumbered from part of NM 273 in the 1988 renumbering. |
| NM 183 | — | — | NM 11 in Alma | Cooney | — | 1946 | |
| NM 183 | 0.596 | 0.959 | La Union | La Union | 1988 | current | Renumbered from part of NM 273 in the 1988 renumbering. |
| NM 184 | — | — | NM 78 (now NM 163) | NM 145 (now NM 159) in Black Spring | — | 1942 | became an extension of NM 78 |
| NM 184 | 0.567 | 0.912 | NM 273 in Santa Teresa | Country Club Road to SH 20 at Texas state line | 1988 | current | Renumbered from NM 273 Spur in the 1988 renumbering. |
| NM 185 | — | — | NM 186 (now a forest road; former NM 61) | NM 52 | — | 1942 | became an extension of NM 59 |
| NM 185 | 35.397 | 56.966 | Las Cruces | Hatch | 1988 | current | Renumbered from part of US 85 in the 1988 renumbering. |
| NM 186 | — | — | NM 180 (now NM 152) at San Lorenzo | NM 185 | — | 1942 | became an extension of NM 61 |
| NM 186 | 1.522 | 2.449 | NM 28 near Chamberino | FL 5872 (Levee Road) near Anthony | 1988 | current | Renumbered from part of NM 404 in the 1988 renumbering. |
| NM 187 | — | — | US 260 (now US 180) | NM 186 near Mimbres | — | 1942 | became an extension of NM 25 |
| NM 187 | 36.253 | 58.344 | Hatch | Truth or Consequences | 1988 | current | Renumbered from part of US 85 in the 1988 renumbering. |
| NM 188 | — | — | US 70 in Lordsburg | Red Rock | — | 1953 | Now NM 464 |
| NM 188 | 2.945 | 4.740 | Las Cruces | Las Cruces | 1988 | current | Renumbered from US 85 bypass in the 1988 renumbering. |
| NM 189 | — | — | NM 180 in White Signal | US 80 in Separ | — | 1953 | |
| NM 189 | 1.200 | 1.931 | La Mesa | Vado | 1988 | current | Renumbered from part of NM 227 in the 1988 renumbering. |
| NM 190 | — | — | NM 11 in Silver City | NM 11 southeast of Silver CIty | — | 1947 | |
| NM 190 | 2.110 | 3.396 | Dexter | Dexter | — | — | |
| NM 191 | — | — | US 66 in Cubero | US 66 in Cubero | — | 1947 | |
| NM 191 | — | — | Arizona State Line | NM 32 near Fence Lake | — | 1980 | |
| NM 192 | 2.367 | 3.809 | San Miguel | Mesquite | 1988 | current | Renumbered from part of NM 228 in the 1988 renumbering. |
| NM 193 | 42.200 | 67.914 | Springer | Raton | — | — | |
| NM 194 | — | — | Los Ranchos | NM 528 in Alameda | — | 1993 | Rio Grande Blvd. |
| NM 195 | — | — | US 54 in Carrizozo | Claunch | — | 1942 | Became NM 15 when it was rerouted east from Claunch instead of south. Later this became part of NM 10, later NM 14, and is now part of NM 55. |
| NM 195 | 6.550 | 10.541 | NM 181 at I-25 north of Truth or Consequences | NM 177 at Elephant Butte Dam | 1988 | current | Renumbered from part of NM 52 in the 1988 renumbering. |
| NM 196 | 11.659 | 18.763 | Costilla | Costilla Ski Basin | — | — | |
| NM 197 | 31.825 | 51.217 | Cuba | Sandoval–McKinley county line | — | — | |
| NM 198 | — | — | NM 96 south of La Madera | La Madera | — | 1941 | |
| NM 198 | 2.657 | 4.276 | NM 143 | Spring Canyon State Park | 1988 | current | |
| NM 199 | — | — | NM 21 in Rayado | I-25 in Springer | — | 1988 | Became part of NM 21 in the 1988 renumbering. |
| NM 200 | — | — | US 66 near Coolidge | Coolidge | — | 1945 | |
| NM 200 | 8.410 | 13.535 | Carlsbad | Carlsbad | 2000 | current | Also known as the Carlsbad Relief Route |
| NM 201 | — | — | US 66 in Albuquerque | Kirtland AFB | — | 1980 | |
| NM 201 | — | — | NM 30 in Española | US 84/US 285 in Española | — | 1993 | Became part of rerouted US 84 and US 285 |
| NM 202 | — | — | NM 83 near Lovington | US 62 | — | 1944 | Became part of NM 8 (this section now NM 238) |
| NM 202 | 12.600 | 20.278 | US 70 near Midway | FM 1760 at Texas state line | 1988 | current | |
| NM 203 | 10.300 | 16.576 | CR 3 at the De Baca/Guadalupe County line | US 84 north of Fort Sumner | — | — | |
| NM 204 | 11.300 | 18.186 | US 64 north of Cimarron | Philmont Scout Ranch | — | — | |
| NM 205 | 4.145 | 6.671 | Jal | Bennet | — | — | |
| NM 206 | — | — | US 82 | US 285 | — | 1947 | Became part of NM 31 (portions now NM 360 and county roads) |
| NM 206 | 83.879 | 134.990 | US 82 near Lovington | US 70 in Portales | 1988 | current | Renumbered from part of NM 18 in the 1988 renumbering. |
| NM 207 | — | — | Roswell, New Mexico | Bottomless Lakes State Park | — | 1947 | |
| NM 207 | 5.925 | 9.535 | NM 18 near Eunice | NM 176 in Eunice | 1988 | current | Renumbered from NM 18 BL in the 1988 renumbering. Section north of Eunice renumbered NM 248 in May 2006. |
| NM 208 | 3.470 | 5.584 | NM 18 in Hobbs | US 62/US 180 near Hobbs | 1988 | current | Renumbered from NM 18 BYP in the 1988 renumbering. Also known as the Hobbs Truck Bypass |
| NM 209 | 84.407 | 135.840 | Clovis | Tucumcari | 1988 | current | Renumbered from part of NM 18 in the 1988 renumbering. |
| NM 210 | 4.008 | 6.450 | McAlister | Ragland | — | — | |
| NM 211 | 6.447 | 10.375 | Gila | Cliff | — | — | |
| NM 212 | 4.100 | 6.598 | NM 272 | US 60/US 84 east of Fort Sumner | — | — | |
| NM 213 | 6.085 | 9.793 | FM 3255 at the Texas state line | White Sands Missile Range | — | — | |
| NM 214 | — | — | US 70 in Glencoe | US 380 near Capitan | — | 1994 | Partially NM 220 now |
| NM 215 | 3.047 | 4.904 | El Rito | Las Placitas | — | — | NM 215 Spur was renumbered as NM 571 in the 1988 renumbering. |
| NM 216 | 6.442 | 10.367 | Loving | Carlsbad | — | — | |
| NM 217 | 10.545 | 16.971 | Chilili | Sedillo | — | — | |
| NM 218 | — | — | Mt. Calvary Cemetery | NM 65 in Las Vegas | — | — | |
| NM 218 | 1.709 | 2.750 | NM 18/NM 132 in Hobbs | US 62/US 180 near Hobbs | 1988 | current | Renumbered from part of NM 132 in the 1988 renumbering. |
| NM 219 | 15.213 | 24.483 | US 54 in Pastura | I-40/US 84 north of Pastura | — | — | |
| NM 220 | — | — | Happy Valley | Carlsbad | — | — | |
| NM 220 | 16.008 | 25.762 | Alto | Capitan | 1994 | current | |
| NM 221 | 4.648 | 7.480 | Cebolla | Alire | — | — | |
| NM 222 | — | — | NM 14 near Escanoba | I-40 in Edgewood | — | 1998 | |
| NM 223 | 2.184 | 3.515 | Pecos | Pecos | — | — | |
| NM 224 | 15.600 | 25.106 | US 60/US 84 east of Melrose | NM 288 | — | — | |
| NM 225 | 2.164 | 3.483 | NM 28 near La Union | FM 1905 near Anthony | — | — | |
| NM 226 | 2.600 | 4.184 | Chamberino | Berino | — | — | |
| NM 227 | 1.816 | 2.923 | Las Cruces | Las Cruces | — | — | Section west of NM 478 renumbered NM 189 in the 1988 renumbering. |
| NM 228 | 1.812 | 2.916 | Las Cruces | Las Cruces | — | — | Section west of NM 478 renumbered NM 192 in the 1988 renumbering. |
| NM 229 | 12.426 | 19.998 | US 285 in Atoka | US 285 in Artesia | — | — | |
| NM 230 | 4.824 | 7.763 | Taos | Taos | — | — | |
| NM 231 | 4.995 | 8.039 | Tucumcari | Grady | — | — | |
| NM 232 | — | — | NM 3 | Lovato | — | 2002 | |
| NM 233 | 0.850 | 1.368 | Española | Medanales | — | — | |
| NM 234 | — | — | US 64 | Dawson | — | — | |
| NM 234 | — | — | NM 207 in Eunice | SH 176 at Texas state line | 1988 | 2006 | Renumbered from part of NM 176 in the 1988 renumbering. Became part of NM 176 again in May 2006. |
| NM 235 | 17.879 | 28.773 | NM 206 near Dora | FM 298 at Texas state line | — | — | |
| NM 236 | 20.581 | 33.122 | Melrose | Portales | — | — | |
| NM 237 | 2.410 | 3.879 | I-40 Bus. in Tucumcari | US 54 in Tucumcari | — | — | part of US 54 until the Tucumcari bypass was built. |
| NM 238 | — | — | Bayard | Bayard | — | — | Street unknown |
| NM 238 | 19.466 | 31.327 | NM 529 west of Hobbs | US 82 west of Lovington | 1988 | current | Renumbered from part of NM 8 in the 1988 renumbering. |
| NM 239 | — | — | US 285 in Carlsbad | County Road | — | 1988 | |
| NM 240 | 6.185 | 9.954 | Ranchos de Taos | Taos | — | — | |
| NM 241 | 9.700 | 15.611 | NM 209/NM 275 in Broadview | FM 1058 at the Texas state line | — | — | Extended over the east-west segment of NM 93 in the 1988 renumbering. |
| NM 242 | — | — | Western New Mexico University | NM 90 in Silver City | — | — | |
| NM 243 | — | — | Deming | Deming | — | — | |
| NM 243 | 8.206 | 13.206 | US 62/US 180 northeast of Carlsbad | US 62/US 180/NM 176 near Carlsbad | 1988 | current | Renumbered from part of NM 176 in the 1988 renumbering. |
| NM 244 | — | — | Roswell | Roswell | — | — | College Boulevard |
| NM 244 | 29.435 | 47.371 | US 82 in Cloudcroft | US 70 northeast of Mescalero | 1988 | current | Renumbered from part of NM 24 in the 1988 renumbering. |
| NM 245 | 7.021 | 11.299 | NM 311 north of Cannon Air Force Base | NM 209 in Clovis | 1988 | current | |
| NM 246 | 82.456 | 132.700 | Capitan | Roswell | 1988 | current | Renumbered from part of NM 48 in the 1988 renumbering. |
| NM 247 | 48.342 | 77.799 | US 54 in Corona | US 285 near Ramon | 1988 | current | Renumbered from part of NM 42 in the 1988 renumbering. |
| NM 248 | — | — | US 550 (now NM 516) in Aztec | Aztec Ruins National Monument | — | 2001 | |
| NM 248 | 6.674 | 10.741 | NM 176 in Eunice | NM 18 near Hobbs | 2006 | current | established May 2006 as a replacement for part of NM 207. |
| NM 249 | 44.100 | 70.972 | Hagerman | Maljamar | 1988 | current | Renumbered from part of NM 31 in the 1988 renumbering. |
| NM 250 | 4.500 | 7.242 | Las Vegas | Las Vegas Municipal Airport | — | — | |
| NM 251 | — | — | US 64/US 84/US 285 in Santa Fe | NM 22 (later NM 590) in Santa Fe | — | 1989 | |
| NM 252 | 43.106 | 69.372 | Taiban | Ragland | — | — | Extended over part of NM 86 in the 1988 renumbering. Section south of Taiban renumbered NM 294 |
| NM 253 | 5.400 | 8.690 | NM 256 southeast of Roswell | End of route southeast of Roswell | — | — | Originally looped around to US 380 and made another loop on the other side of US 380, but this became part of NM 261 and NM 265 in 1988 |
| NM 254 | 4.378 | 7.046 | NM 256 in Roswell | US 380 in Roswell | — | — | |
| NM 255 | 3.112 | 5.008 | NM 256 southeast of Roswell | NM 253 southeast of Roswell | — | — | |
| NM 256 | — | — | NM 18 in Jal | Texas state line | — | 1955 | Renumbered NM 128 to match Texas (256 was unavailable in Texas) |
| NM 256 | 8.230 | 13.245 | NM 2 south of Roswell | US 380 in Roswell | 1988 | current | Renumbered from part of NM 2 in the 1988 renumbering. |
| NM 257 | — | — | US 70 at Eastern New Mexico University | Eastern New Mexico University | — | — | |
| NM 258 | 9.980 | 16.061 | South Roosevelt Road 41 west of Milnesand | NM 206/NM 252 in Milnesand | 1988 | current | Renumbered from part of NM 262 in the 1988 renumbering |
| NM 259 | — | — | US 64 in Taos | Kit Carson Memorial | — | — | |
| NM 259 | — | — | NM 458 | Roosevelt Road N& Roosevelt Road 30 | 1988 | 1990 | Renumbered from NM 458 Spur in the 1988 renumbering. |
| NM 260 | — | — | NM 381 | Brantley Lake | 1988 | 1990 | Renumbered from NM 381 Spur in the 1988 renumbering. |
| NM 261 | — | — | Portales | Portales | — | — | |
| NM 261 | 4.570 | 7.355 | NM 253 southeast of Roswell | NM 254 southeast of Roswell | 1988 | current | Renumbered from part of NM 253 in the 1988 renumbering. |
| NM 262 | 17.640 | 28.389 | NM 206 in Milnesand | FM 2182 at the Texas state line | — | — | |
| NM 263 | 5.720 | 9.205 | Los Lunas | Los Lunas | — | — | |
| NM 264 | — | — | US 56 in Clayton | US 56 in Clayton | — | 1966 | First Avenue and Fourth Street in Clayton |
| NM 264 | 15.945 | 25.661 | SR 264 at Arizona state line | US 491 in Yah-ta-hey | — | — | |
| NM 265 | 4.039 | 6.500 | College Boulevard/Atkinson Avenue in Roswell | US 380 and Red Bridge Road east of Roswell | 1988 | 2010 | Renumbered from part of NM 253 in the 1988 renumbering. |
| NM 266 | 6.400 | 10.300 | Las Vegas | San Ignacio | — | — | |
| NM 267 | 32.389 | 52.125 | Portales | Melrose | 1988 | current | Renumbered from part of NM 88 in the 1988 renumbering. |
| NM 268 | 27.718 | 44.608 | Melrose | Ragland | 1988 | current | Renumbered from part of NM 88 in the 1988 renumbering. |
| NM 269 | — | — | NM 45 near Isleta Pueblo | NM 314 in Pajarito | — | 1993 | |
| NM 270 | — | — | US 60/US 84 near Clovis | US 70 in Clovis | — | 2000 | |
| NM 271 | 24.100 | 38.785 | Wagon Mound | Mora–San Miguel county line | — | — | |
| NM 272 | 9.310 | 14.983 | Fort Sumner | Fort Sumner | — | — | |
| NM 273 | 14.015 | 22.555 | Anapra Road at the Texas state line in Sunland Park | NM 28 in La Union | — | — | Section from NM 28 east renumbered NM 183 in the 1988 renumbering. Section from NM 28 west renumbered as NM 182 in 2000; one small section to the north was removed from the state highway system. It was rerouted over NM 319. |
| NM 274 | — | — | NM 10 near Cedar Crest | La Madera | — | — | |
| NM 275 | 14.938 | 24.040 | NM 209 in Broadview | NM 469 north of Wheatland | — | — | |
| NM 276 | 5.800 | 9.334 | Mora | Lower Rociada | — | — | |
| NM 277 | — | — | US 60/US 84 | NM 88 | — | 1988 | south section transferred to NM 311 in the 1988 renumbering; north section eliminated by 1983 |
| NM 278 | — | — | Albuquerque | Albuquerque | — | — | Bypass |
| NM 278 | 33.536 | 53.971 | Grady | Tucumcari | 1988 | current | Renumbered from part of NM 88 in the 1988 renumbering. |
| NM 279 | 11.600 | 18.668 | Laguna | Seboyeta | — | — | |
| NM 281 | 6.364 | 10.242 | End of route near McAllister Lake | NM 104 east of Las Vegas | — | — | |
| NM 282 | 1.088 | 1.751 | Aztec | Aztec Municipal Airport | — | — | |
| NM 283 | 13.811 | 22.227 | Las Vegas | Mineral Hill | — | — | |
| NM 284 | — | — | Santa Fe Airport | NM 14 in Santa Fe | — | 1993 | Removed from system, probably due to completion of the Santa Fe Relief Route; now Santa Fe County Road 56 |
| NM 286 | — | — | Santa Fe | Santa Fe | — | 1958 | Alameda Street |
| NM 286 | 0.781 | 1.257 | Tucumcari | Tucumcari | — | — | Renumbered from part of NM 88 in the 1988 renumbering. |
| NM 287 | — | — | Military Institute | Roswell | — | — | |
| NM 287 | — | — | NM 88 in Portales | NM 88 in Portales | 1988 | — | |
| NM 288 | 27.503 | 44.262 | Weber City | Claud | 1988 | current | Renumbered from part of NM 89 in the 1988 renumbering. |
| NM 289 | — | — | Dexter | Dexter | — | — | 3400 feet in length |
| NM 289 | 1.833 | 2.950 | Claud | Broadview | 1988 | current | Renumbered from NM 89 spur in the 1988 renumbering. |
| NM 290 | 6.060 | 9.753 | NM 4 near Jemez Pueblo | Ponderosa | — | — | |
| NM 291 | 3.600 | 5.794 | Santa Cruz | Ranchitos | — | — | Section north of Ranchitos renumbered NM 582 in the 1988 renumbering. |
| NM 292 | 1.450 | 2.334 | Las Cruces | Las Cruces | — | — | |
| NM 293 | 4.925 | 7.926 | NM 211 west of Gila | Mogollon Creek | — | — | Second section renumbered NM 153 in the 1988 renumbering. |
| NM 294 | — | — | US 380 near Tatum | Texas state line | — | 1955 | Renumbered NM 125 to match Texas (294 was unavailable in Texas) |
| NM 294 | 15.757 | 25.358 | de Baca County Road 3 | US 60/US 84 near Taiban | 1988 | current | Renumbered from part of NM 252 in the 1988 renumbering. |
| NM 295 | — | — | NM 314 in Albuquerque | NM 314 in Albuquerque | — | — | La Vega Drive |
| NM 295 | — | — | NM 272 in Fort Sumner | NM 272 in Fort Sumner | 1988 | — | Renumbered from NM 272 loop in the 1988 renumbering. |
| NM 296 | — | — | US 85 (now NM 556) in Alameda | NM 425 in Alameda | — | 1985 | Alameda Road; removed due to NM 528 extension |
| NM 297 | — | — | US 66 (Central Avenue) in Albuquerque | Menaul Blvd in Albuquerque | — | 1980 | Wyoming Blvd |
| NM 297 | — | — | House | House | 1988 | — | Renumbered from NM 470 spur in the 1988 renumbering. |
| NM 298 | — | — | — | — | — | — | An unknown road in Albuquerque |
| NM 299 | — | — | NM 31 east of Loving | road intersection | 1988 | — | Renumbered from part of NM 387 and NM 387 Spur in the 1988 renumbering. |
| NM 300 | 6.605 | 10.630 | NM 466 in Santa Fe | US 285 spur near I-25 east of Santa Fe | — | — | Part of the Old Las Vegas Highway |
| NM 301 | — | — | NM 101 in Las Cruces | US 70 in Las Cruces | — | — | Solano Avenue |
| NM 301 | — | — | I-25 near Santo Domingo Pueblo | NM 14 near Golden | 1988 | 1990 | Renumbered from part of NM 22 in the 1988 renumbering. |
| NM 302 | 3.0 | 4.8 | NM 371 south of Farmington | NAPI HQ | — | — | |
| NM 303 | 0.573 | 0.922 | U.S. Route 85 in Albuquerque vicinity | NM 98 in Albuquerque | — | — | Claremont Avenue |
| NM 303 | — | — | NM 47 near Albuquerque | NM 314 in Albuquerque | 1988 | 2002 | Renumbered from part of NM 47 in the 1988 renumbering north of Prosperity Avenue, and south of there established on a new route in exchange for turning back Second Street (NM 47 before the renumbering). |
| NM 304 | — | — | U.S. Route 66 in Albuquerque | U.S. Route 85 in Albuquerque | — | — | 8th Street |
| NM 304 | 23.284 | 37.472 | La Joya | Belen | 1988 | current | Renumbered from part of NM 47 in the 1988 renumbering. |
| NM 305 | — | — | NM 28 in Las Cruces | NM 342 in Las Cruces | — | — | Three Crosses Avenue and Mesquite Street |
| NM 305 | 0.500 | 0.805 | End of route at Rio Arriba–Sandoval county line | NM 595 west of Lindrith | 1988 | current | Renumbered from NM 95 spur in the 1988 renumbering. The section in Sandoval County was turned back in 1988. |
| NM 306 | — | — | NM 14 in San Antonito | NM 333 in Sedillo | 1988 | 1995 | Renumbered from part of NM 536 in the 1988 renumbering. |
| NM 307 | — | — | NM 45 near Albuquerque | NM 314 near Albuquerque | — | 1990 | Removed due to NM 500 extension |
| NM 308 | — | — | NM 45 near Albuquerque | NM 314 near Albuquerque | — | 1990 | |
| NM 309 | 2.432 | 3.914 | Belen | Belen | 1988 | current | Renumbered from part of NM 6 in the 1988 renumbering. |
| NM 311 | 22.869 | 36.804 | Field | Clovis | — | — | |
| NM 312 | 8.112 | 13.055 | NM 252 in McAlister | NM 268 south of Forrest | — | — | |
| NM 313 | 17.091 | 27.505 | NM 556 in Albuquerque | FR 2530 north of Algodones | 1988 | current | Renumbered from part of US 85 in the 1988 renumbering. |
| NM 314 | 18.523 | 29.810 | Belen | Isleta Village Proper | 1988 | current | Renumbered from part of US 85 in the 1988 renumbering. |
| NM 315 | 0.479 | 0.771 | Algodones | Algodones | 1988 | current | |
| NM 316 | 3.6 | 5.8 | Mesa Verde Ranch | US 54/70 in Alomogordo | — | — | |
| NM 317 | — | — | — | — | — | — | An unknown road in Eddy County |
| NM 317 | 1.247 | 2.007 | Isleta Pueblo | Isleta Pueblo | 1988 | current | |
| NM 318 | — | — | US 70 near Clovis | US 60/US 84 near Clovis | — | 1988 | |
| NM 319 | — | — | NM 273 near La Union | NM 28 | — | 1988 | consolidated with NM 273 |
| NM 320 | 2.000 | 3.219 | Las Cruces | Doña Ana | — | — | |
| NM 321 | 4.606 | 7.413 | NM 114 in Causey | FM 54 at New Mexico–Texas state line | — | — | |
| NM 322 | 3.152 | 5.073 | near Monument | NM 8 in Monument | — | — | |
| NM 323 | — | — | US 285 in Carlsbad | US 62 in Carlsbad | — | 1980 | |
| NM 324 | — | — | US 285 in Roswell | Eastern New Mexico State Fair Grounds | — | — | |
| NM 325 | 16.669 | 26.826 | Capulin | Des Moines | — | — | Rerouted over section of NM 72 in the 1988 renumbering. Old route renumbered NM 456. |
| NM 326 | 1.329 | 2.139 | Albuquerque | Albuquerque | — | — | Street unknown |
| NM 327 | — | — | US 85 (now NM 14) in Santa Fe | US 84/US 85/US 285 (now Old Pecos Trail) in Santa Fe | — | 1958 | Now Cordova Road, |
| NM 327 | 0.560 | 0.901 | Isleta Village Proper | Isleta Village Proper | — | — | |
| NM 328 | — | — | US 84/US 85/US 285 (now Old Pecos Trail) in Santa Fe | Dead End in Santa Fe | — | — | Now Old Santa Fe Trail |
| NM 328 | — | — | I-40 in Albuquerque | I-40 in Albuquerque | 1988 | 1990 | Historic routing of U.S. Route 66 |
| NM 329 | 1.881 | 3.027 | Las Vegas | Las Vegas | — | — | |
| NM 330 | 20.363 | 32.771 | Elida | Melrose | — | — | |
| NM 331 | — | — | South of Deming | NM 418 near Deming | — | 1999 | deleted in 1990, but restored by 1996 |
| NM 332 | — | — | NM 331 near Deming | I-10 | — | 2003 | partially impassable |
| NM 333 | — | — | Central | Whiskey Creek | — | 1961 | Old US 180; now partially impassable |
| NM 333 | 27.715 | 44.603 | NM 566 (Tranway Boulevard) and Central Avenue in Albuquerque | I-40 Bus. in Moriarty | — | — | Historic routing of U.S. Route 66 |
| NM 334 | — | — | US 66 (now I-40) in Bluewater | NM 279 in Marquez | — | 1980 | |
| NM 335 | — | — | US 285 in Atoka | NM 229 near Atoka | — | 1990 | |
| NM 336 | — | — | NM 335 in Atoka | US 285 in Atoka | — | 1990 | |
| NM 337 | — | — | NM 18 near Lovington | Texas state line | — | 1963 | became part of US 82 |
| NM 337 | 29.685 | 47.773 | Estancia | Tijeras | 1988 | current | renumbered from part of NM 14 in the 1988 renumbering. |
| NM 338 | 24.440 | 39.332 | I-10 near Gary | County Road 23C001 in Animas | — | — | |
| NM 339 | — | — | NM 558 west of Hagerman | NM 2 in Dexter | — | — | Decommissioning date is unknown. |
| NM 340 | — | — | NM 2 south of Greenfield | NM 2 north of Dexter | — | — | Decommissioning date is unknown. |
| NM 341 | 1.3 | 2.1 | Albuquerque | Albuquerque | — | — | Street unknown |
| NM 341 | — | — | NM 519 near La Madera | Servilleta | — | — | |
| NM 342 | — | — | NM 292 near Las Cruces | I-25 in Las Cruces | — | 2000 | NM 342 Spur partially renumbered NM 138 and rest eliminated in the 1988 renumbering. |
| NM 343 | 0.7 | 1.1 | NM 304 in Albuquerque | US 85 in Albuquerque | — | — | Lead Avenue and Coal Avenue |
| NM 344 | 17.372 | 27.958 | NM 333/Historic US 66 in Edgewood | NM 14 near Golden | — | — | |
| NM 345 | — | — | US 70 in Las Cruces | NM 28 in Las Cruces | — | — | Compress Road |
| NM 345 | — | — | Albuquerque | Albuquerque | — | — | Removed from system in a route swap with the city of Albuquerque. Albuquerque took over this road in exchange for NMDOT taking over the southern portion of Coors Boulevard between Old Coors and St Josephs Boulevard. Reinstated by 2020. |
| NM 346 | 2.710 | 4.361 | NM 116 south of Belen | NM 304 | — | — | |
| NM 347 | 29.600 | 47.637 | Albuquerque | Bernalillo | 2010 | current | |
| NM 348 | 7.200 | 11.587 | Roosevelt Road A/FM 3125 at Texas state line | US 60/US 70/US 84 in Texico | — | — | |
| NM 349 | 8.500 | 13.679 | Carrizozo | White Oaks | — | — | |
| NM 350 | — | — | Cottonwood Springs | NM 2 near Artesia | — | 1988 | |
| NM 351 | — | — | NM 350 near Artesia | NM 438 near Artesia | — | 2000 | |
| NM 352 | — | — | US 66 (Central Avenue) in downtown Albuquerque | I-40 in northeast Albuquerque | — | 1980 | |
| NM 353 | — | — | US 87 in Clayton | Clayton airport | — | — | |
| NM 355 | 1.091 | 1.756 | Carlsbad | Carlsbad | — | — | |
| NM 356 | 5.052 | 8.130 | Bayard | Hanover | — | — | |
| NM 357 | 3.950 | 6.357 | Artesia | — | — | — | |
| NM 358 | — | — | Albuquerque | Albuquerque | — | — | Served University Heights School |
| NM 359 | 2.616 | 4.210 | Las Cruces | — | — | — | |
| NM 360 | 25.098 | 40.391 | US 62/US 180 northeast of Carlsbad | US 83 near Artesia | — | — | Extended south over part of NM 31 in the 1988 renumbering. |
| NM 361 | — | — | NM 47 near Albuquerque | US 85 (now 4th St; former NM 313) in Albuquerque | — | 1988 | Became part of rerouted NM 47 in the 1988 renumbering. |
| NM 362 | — | — | Albuquerque | Albuquerque | — | — | Street unknown |
| NM 363 | 5.0 | 8.0 | Albuquerque | Albuquerque | — | — | Probably Indian School Road |
| NM 364 | — | — | AZ 364 at the Arizona State Line | CO 40 at the Colorado State Line | — | 1965 | Replaced by US 164, now US 160 |
| NM 365 | — | — | NM State Fair Grounds in Albuquerque | US 66 in Albuquerque | — | 1980 | |
| NM 366 | — | — | Albuquerque | Albuquerque | — | 1980 | Carlisle Boulevard |
| NM 367 | 5.000 | 8.047 | Albuquerque | Albuquerque | — | 1980 | |
| NM 368 | 17.458 | 28.096 | Tinnie | Arabela | — | — | |
| NM 369 | 2.400 | 3.862 | Española | Española | — | — | |
| NM 370 | 47.521 | 76.478 | Clayton | Folsom | — | — | |
| NM 371 | 107.650 | 173.246 | Thoreau | Farmington | — | — | Bisti Highway. From Thoreau to Crownpoint was formerly part of NM 57. |
| NM 372 | 2.633 | 4.237 | Las Cruces | Mesilla | — | — | |
| NM 373 | 1.496 | 2.408 | Mesilla | Mesilla | — | — | |
| NM 374 | 1.224 | 1.970 | — | Mesilla Dam | — | — | |
| NM 375 | — | — | US 64 near Hoxie Junction | Koehler | — | 1970 | |
| NM 376 | — | — | NM 371 in Farmington | US 64 in Farmington | — | 1988 | Pinon Street; originally followed Broadway before the bypass on it from Miller to Pinon opened |
| NM 377 | 1.877 | 3.021 | Deming | — | — | — | |
| NM 378 | 3.400 | 5.472 | Questa | Taos County Dump | — | — | |
| NM 379 | — | — | I-40 near Santa Rosa | Colonias | — | 1990 | |
| NM 381 | — | — | US 285 near Seven Rivers | NM 229 near Atoka | — | 2000 | |
| NM 382 | — | — | NM 68 | Miranda Canyon | — | 2000 | |
| NM 385 | — | — | NM 309 near Belen | NM 314 near Belen | — | 2003 | |
| NM 386 | 8.820 | 14.194 | Dilia | Anton Chico | — | — | |
| NM 387 | — | — | US 285 in Loving | NM 299 | — | 1999 | |
| NM 389 | — | — | NM 68 | county line north of Alcalde | — | 2000 | |
| NM 390 | 4.280 | 6.888 | Salem | Garfield | — | — | |
| NM 391 | — | — | NM 187 in Salem | NM 187 near Hatch | — | 1989 | |
| NM 392 | 15.878 | 25.553 | Endee | Porter | — | — | |
| NM 393 | — | — | NM 185 | NM 140 near Rincon | — | 1989 | |
| NM 394 | — | — | US 180 in Deming | Arrowhead | — | 2000 | |
| NM 395 | 0.480 | 0.772 | Tinne | Tinne | — | — | |
| NM 396 | — | — | US 62/US 180 near Carlsbad | Black River Village | — | 2000 | |
| NM 397 | — | — | US 285 in Roswell | US 285 in Roswell | — | — | College Boulevard, Washington Avenue, and Hobbs Street |
| NM 398 | — | — | NM 275 near Broadview | NM 93 near Bellview | — | 1990 | |
| NM 399 | 3.185 | 5.126 | Sombrillo | La Mesilla | — | — | NM 399 Spur was renumbered NM 581 in the 1988 renumbering. |
| NM 400 | 10.620 | 17.091 | — | McGaffey | — | — | |
| NM 401 | — | — | I-40 in Albuquerque | US 66 in Albuquerque | — | 1980 | San Pedro Dr in Albuquerque |
| NM 402 | — | — | US 66 Truck (now Menaul Boulevard) in Albuquerque | US 66 in Albuquerque | — | — | 5th/6th Street |
| NM 402 | 62.852 | 101.150 | Nara Visa | Clayton | 1988 | current | Renumbered from part of NM 18 in the 1988 renumbering. |
| NM 403 | — | — | NM 44 in Counselor | Mustang Camp | — | — | |
| NM 404 | 9.700 | 15.611 | Anthony | NM 213 in Chaparral | — | — | Portion west of NM 460 removed from the state highway system and rest renumbered NM 186 in 1997. |
| NM 405 | — | — | NM 225 near Anthony | NM 404 near Anthony | — | 1983 | |
| NM 406 | — | — | New Mexico state tuberculosis sanatorium in Socorro | Socorro | — | 1974 | |
| NM 406 | 35.145 | 56.560 | Clayton | — | 1988 | current | Renumbered from part of NM 18 in the 1988 renumbering. |
| NM 407 | — | — | NM 32 (now NM 610) in Gallup | Gallup Indian Medical Center | — | — | Nizhoni Boulevard |
| NM 408 | 6.017 | 9.683 | Lemitar | Chamizal | — | — | |
| NM 409 | 13.200 | 21.243 | Roswell | Bottomless Lakes State Park | — | — | |
| NM 410 | — | — | — | — | — | — | An unknown road in Artesia |
| NM 410 | 1.942 | 3.125 | NM 406 near Moses | Local road at the New Mexico–Oklahoma state line | 1988 | current | |
| NM 411 | 3.965 | 6.381 | Clayton | — | 1988 | current | |
| NM 412 | 6.790 | 10.927 | — | Bluewater State Park | — | — | |
| NM 413 | — | — | NM 404 | NM 226 near Berino | — | 1983 | |
| NM 414 | 0.350 | 0.563 | Ojo Caliente | — | — | — | |
| NM 415 | — | — | NM 28 near Chamberino | Chamberino | — | 1983 | |
| NM 416 | — | — | NM 273 near La Union | NM 319 (now NM 273) near La Union | — | 1983 | |
| NM 417 | 4.750 | 7.644 | NM 402 | RM 3296 at the New Mexico–Texas state line | 1989 | current | |
| NM 418 | 14.069 | 22.642 | — | Deming | — | — | Former US Route 70/80 |
| NM 419 | 48.752 | 78.459 | Variadero | Mosquerdo | 1988 | current | Renumbered from part of NM 65 in the 1988 renumbering. |
| NM 420 | 30.473 | 49.042 | Mosquerdo | Nara Vista | 1988 | current | Renumbered from part of NM 65 in the 1988 renumbering. |
| NM 421 | — | — | Farmington | Farmington | — | — | Apache Street |
| NM 421 | 8.101 | 13.037 | NM 402 | SH 102 at the New Mexico–Texas state line | 1988 | current | Renumbered from part of NM 102 in the 1988 renumbering. |
| NM 422 | — | — | NM 500 near Albuquerque | US 85 (now NM 273) near Bernalillo | — | 1981 | now I-25 |
| NM 423 | 17.000 | 27.359 | Albuquerque | Albuquerque | — | — | |
| NM 424 | — | — | New Mexico Highlands University | New Mexico Highlands University | — | — | |
| NM 425 | — | — | NM 98 in Albuquerque | NM 296 near Albuquerque | — | 1990 | |
| NM 426 | — | — | Sofia | US 64/US 87 in Mt. Dora | — | 1989 | mileage exchanged with NM 417 |
| NM 427 | 3.980 | 6.405 | Deming | Deming | — | — | |
| NM 428 | — | — | Lake Avalon South Side | NM 239 near Carlsbad | — | 1988 | |
| NM 429 | — | — | NM 96 in El Rito | Northern New Mexico College | — | 1988 | |
| NM 430 | — | — | US 70 in Fairacres | US 85 near Las Cruces | — | 1979 | |
| NM 431 | 1.710 | 2.752 | Roswell | Roswell | — | — | |
| NM 432 | 1.000 | 1.609 | Mesa Rica | Mesa Rica | 1988 | current | Renumbered from part of NM 129 in the 1988 renumbering. |
| NM 433 | 2.900 | 4.667 | Conchas | Conchas | 1988 | current | Renumbered from part of NM 129 in the 1988 renumbering. |
| NM 434 | 36.843 | 59.293 | Mora | Eagle Nest | 1988 | current | Renumbered from part of NM 38 in the 1988 renumbering. |
| NM 435 | 5.206 | 8.378 | Reserve | — | — | — | |
| NM 436 | 3.541 | 5.699 | Garfield | Derry | — | — | |
| NM 437 | — | — | Deming | Deming cemetery | — | — | |
| NM 438 | 10.016 | 16.119 | Lake Arthur | Cottonwood Creek | — | — | |
| NM 439 | — | — | US 60 in Socorro | Hope Farms Road near Socorro | — | 2003 | still shown on the 2016 map |
| NM 440 | — | — | south of Elida | NM 114 in Elida | — | 1982 | |
| NM 441 | — | — | US 60 in Fort Sumner | US 60 in Fort Sumner | — | — | Avenue C/D and 10th Street |
| NM 442 | 13.010 | 20.938 | Central Avenue in Albuquerque | Douglas-Macarthur school | — | 1980 | |
| NM 442 | 21.375 | 34.400 | La Cueva | Ocate | 1988 | current | Renumbered from part of NM 21 in the 1988 renumbering. |
| NM 443 | — | — | NM 28 near La Union | Texas state line | — | 1983 | Had two sections |
| NM 444 | — | — | Meadows Home in Las Vegas | NM 329 in Las Vegas | — | — | Hot Springs Boulevard |
| NM 445 | 12.255 | 19.723 | Maxwell | Cimarron | 1988 | current | Renumbered from part of US 85 in the 1988 renumbering. |
| NM 446 | — | — | US 62/US 180 in Hobbs | US 62/US 180 in Hobbs | — | — | Broadway |
| NM 446 | 0.250 | 0.402 | Watrous | Valmora | 1988 | current | Shortest state road in New Mexico; was a spur of NM 97 before the 1988 renumbering. |
| NM 447 | — | — | US 70/US 380 in Roswell | US 70/US 285 in Roswell | — | 1990 | |
| NM 448 | 13.010 | 20.938 | Albuquerque | Rio Rancho | — | — | |
| NM 449 | — | — | Rockin R Red Rd | US 82 in Hope | — | 1990 | |
| NM 450 | 0.349 | 0.562 | Valmora | Valmora | 1988 | current | was a spur of NM 97 before the 1988 renumbering. |
| NM 451 | 3.086 | 4.966 | Anton Chico | Dilla | 1988 | current | Renumbered from part of NM 119 in the 1988 renumbering. |
| NM 453 | 20.918 | 33.664 | Clayton | Grenville | 1988 | current | Renumbered from part of NM 120 in the 1988 renumbering. |
| NM 454 | — | — | Santo Domingo Pueblo | NM 22 | — | — | |
| NM 455 | — | — | Governor's Mansion in Santa Fe | NM 22 (later NM 590) in Santa Fe | — | 1988 | |
| NM 455 | 1.540 | 2.478 | Clayton | Clayton Lake State Park | 1988 | current | Renumbered from NM 370 Spur in the 1988 renumbering. |
| NM 456 | 58.784 | 94.604 | NM 325 at Folsom | SH-325 at the New Mexico–Oklahoma state line | 1988 | current | Renumbered from part of NM 325 in the 1988 renumbering. |
| NM 457 | 31.862 | 51.277 | — | Tatum | — | — | |
| NM 458 | 12.048 | 19.389 | Pep | — | — | — | |
| NM 459 | — | — | New Mexico Military Institute | — | — | — | |
| NM 460 | 3.805 | 6.124 | SH 20 at New Mexico–Texas state line | I-10 near Anthony | — | — | |
| NM 461 | 0.490 | 0.789 | Carrizozo | Coyote | — | — | |
| NM 462 | 2.474 | 3.982 | Carrizozo | Ancho | — | — | |
| NM 463 | — | — | NM 549 in Carne | Lewis Flats | — | 1983 | |
| NM 464 | 20.962 | 33.735 | US 70 near Lordsburg | Redrock | — | — | Formerly numbered NM 188. |
| NM 465 | — | — | NM 237 in Tucumcari | BL I-40 in Tucumcari | 1988 | — | Lake Street |
| NM 466 | 4.000 | 6.437 | Santa Fe | Santa Fe | 1958 | current | For a time US 85 Bypass and part of NM 14. |
| NM 467 | 16.765 | 26.981 | Portales | Clovis | — | — | |
| NM 468 | 2.510 | 4.039 | Springer | New Mexico Boys School entrance | — | — | |
| NM 469 | — | — | Taos | Taos | — | — | Plaza |
| NM 469 | 43.553 | 70.092 | Grady | — | 1988 | current | Renumbered from part of NM 39 in the 1988 renumbering. |
| NM 470 | — | — | House | House | — | — | |
| NM 471 | — | — | NM 98 in Albuquerque | I-25 in Albuquerque | — | 1990 | |
| NM 472 | 11.975 | 19.272 | Edgewood | Stanley | — | — | |
| NM 473 | 0.548 | 0.882 | Bernalillo | Bernalillo | — | — | |
| NM 474 | — | — | NM 313 near Algodones | Dead end near I-25 | — | 2000 | Removed from system |
| NM 475 | 16.907 | 27.209 | Santa Fe | Santa Fe Ski Basin | — | — | Extended west over section of NM 22 in the 1988 renumbering. |
| NM 476 | — | — | Raton Coal Mine | I-25 Bus. in Raton | — | 2000 | |
| NM 477 | — | — | I-25 in Watrous | Fort Union National Monument | c. 1960 | 1988 | Became part of NM 161 in the 1988 renumbering. |
| NM 478 | 24.172 | 38.901 | Anthony | Las Cruces | 1956 | current | Historic routing of US 80/US 85 (prior to completion of I-10). Extended north from I-10 to US 70 in the 1988 renumbering. |
| NM 479 | — | — | US 85 (now I-25) near Santa Fe | NM 10 (now NM 14) near Santa Fe | — | 1988 | |
| NM 480 | 13.084 | 21.057 | NM 330 north of Elida | US 70 southwest of Portales | — | — | |
| NM 483 | 16.200 | 26.071 | US 62/US 180 in Arkansas Junction | Lovington | — | — | Former routing of US 62 |
| NM 484 | — | — | — | — | — | — | an unknown road in Tularosa |
| NM 484 | 1.000 | 1.609 | County Road B31A | NM 3 in Pueblo | — | — | Was to be exchanged with San Miguel County, but NM 232 was turned back instead |
| NM 485 | 3.900 | 6.276 | Jemez Pueblo | Canones | — | — | |
| NM 486 | — | — | Alamogordo | Alamogordo | — | — | |
| NM 487 | — | — | NM 18 in Hobbs | US 62/US 180 in Hobbs | — | — | Grimes Street |
| NM 489 | — | — | US 64 west of Farmington | US 64 | — | 2000 | |
| NM 490 | 3.900 | 6.276 | NM 331 south of Deming | NM 11 | — | 2003 | Removed from system |
| NM 494 | 1.918 | 3.087 | Lordsburg | Lordsburg | — | — | |
| NM 495 | — | — | NM 517 south of Deming | NM 11 | — | 1995 | Now County Road C-14 |
| NM 496 | — | — | NM 96 in La Jara | Cañon Madera | — | 1980 | now County Road 496 |
| NM 497 | — | — | NM 148 | NM 418 in Deming | — | 2003 | |
| NM 498 | 0.932 | 1.500 | NM 273 in Sunland Park | Doniphan Drive at the New Mexico–Texas state line | — | — | |
| NM 500 | 4.345 | 6.993 | Albuquerque | Albuquerque | — | — | |
| NM 501 | — | — | Las Vegas | Las Vegas | — | — | Gonzales Street |
| NM 501 | 7.323 | 11.785 | Los Alamos | Los Alamos | 1988 | current | Renumbered from part of NM 4 BL in the 1988 renumbering and also designated along a new route north of NM 502. |
| NM 502 | 18.301 | 29.453 | Los Alamos | Pojoaque | 1988 | current | Renumbered from part of NM 4 BL and part of NM 4 in the 1988 renumbering. |
| NM 503 | 14.570 | 23.448 | Pojoaque | Rio Chiquito | 1988 | current | Renumbered from part of NM 4 in the 1988 renumbering. |
| NM 504 | — | — | Arizona state line (AZ-64/AZ-504) west of Beclabito | US 666 near Shiprock | c. 1960 | 1990 | Became a portion of US 64 |
| NM 505 | 12.100 | 19.473 | Cimarron | Maxwell | — | — | |
| NM 506 | 31.900 | 51.338 | Orogrande | Fort Bliss | — | — | |
| NM 507 | 3.304 | 5.317 | NM 2 near Lake Arthur | Pecos River | — | — | |
| NM 508 | 17.227 | 27.724 | NM 206 near Crossroads | NM 125 near the Texas state line | c. 1960 | current | |
| NM 509 | 36.500 | 58.741 | San Mateo | Whitehorse | c. 1960 | current | |
| NM 510 | — | — | Gibson Blvd., Albuquerque | Central Avenue, Albuquerque | — | 1988 | Louisiana Boulevard |
| NM 510 | — | — | NM 14 at US 85/US 285 in Santa Fe | NM 589? | — | — | Only shows on online maps; route inconsistent |
| NM 511 | 32.346 | 52.056 | US 64 near Blanco | SH 172 at New Mexico–Colorado state line | — | — | |
| NM 512 | 7.700 | 12.392 | Brazos | Corkins Lodge | — | — | |
| NM 513 | 0.700 | 1.127 | Scholle | Abo unit of Salinas Pueblo Missions National Monument | — | — | |
| NM 514 | — | — | Monjeau Lookout Tower | NM 37 | — | — | |
| NM 514 | 1.500 | 2.414 | NM 112 west of Los Ojos | US 64/US 84 in Los Ojos | — | — | Former routing of US 64 |
| NM 515 | 2.100 | 3.380 | Questa | Red River fish hatchery | — | — | |
| NM 516 | — | — | NM 522 in Costilla | Colorado state line | — | 1988 | Turned back; now County Road B24 |
| NM 516 | 13.719 | 22.079 | US 64 in Farmington | US 550 in Aztec | c. 2000 | current | Formerly part of US 550 |
| NM 517 | — | — | County Road C-15 south of Deming | NM 11 | — | 1990 | Removed from system; now County Road C-10 |
| NM 518 | 72.899 | 117.320 | Las Vegas | Ranchos de Taos | 1988 | current | Renumbered from part of NM 3 in the 1988 renumbering. |
| NM 519 | 15.007 | 24.151 | NM 111 in La Madera | Las Tablas | — | — | |
| NM 520 | — | — | NM 503 west of Cundiyo | NM 76 in Chimayo | c. 1970 | 2000 | Now County Road 99 |
| NM 521 | — | — | Sacramento | NM 24 in Weed | — | 2003 | Turned back as part of route swap between NMDOT and Otero County for Alamogordo relief route; still shown on the 2016 map |
| NM 522 | — | — | US 180 | NM 61 | — | — | Now part of NM 61, which followed CR A009. |
| NM 522 | 41.096 | 66.138 | US 64 near Taos | SH 159 at the New Mexico–Colorado state line | 1988 | current | Renumbered from part of NM 3 in the 1988 renumbering. |
| NM 523 | 8.273 | 13.314 | Clovis | — | — | — | |
| NM 524 | 8.500 | 13.679 | Carlsbad | Carlsbad | — | — | |
| NM 525 | 4.946 | 7.960 | White Sands Missile Range (Stallion Gate) | US 380 east of Socorro | — | — | |
| NM 526 | 6.339 | 10.202 | NM 72 east of Raton | NM border at Lake Maloya | c. 1970 | current | |
| NM 527 | — | — | Gila Cliff Dwellings National Monument | NM 25 | — | 1970 | became part of NM 15 |
| NM 527 | 16.922 | 27.233 | Sims Mesa Campground (on Navajo Lake) | US 64 in Gobernator | 1988 | current | |
| NM 528 | 15.355 | 24.711 | Albuquerque | Bernalillo | c. 1970 | current | |
| NM 529 | 31.307 | 50.384 | US 82 near Artesia | US 62/ US 180 near Hobbs | — | — | |
| NM 530 | — | — | Arizona state line | NM 92 in Weed | — | 2000 | |
| NM 531 | 3.300 | 5.311 | Tierra Amarilla | La Puente | — | — | Section northwest of La Puente renumbered NM 572 in the 1988 renumbering. Section east of Tierra Amarilla renumbered as rerouted NM 162. |
| NM 532 | 11.869 | 19.101 | Ruidoso | Sierra Blanca Ski Area | — | — | |
| NM 533 | 0.800 | 1.287 | Stateline Road at the Arizona–New Mexico state line | NM 80 near Rodeo | — | — | |
| NM 534 | — | — | Santa Fe | Santa Fe | — | — | Exact route uncertain; probably now Pen Road |
| NM 535 | — | — | Silver City | Silver City | — | 2003 | |
| NM 536 | 13.392 | 21.552 | Sandia Peak | NM 14 in San Antonio | c. 1970 | current | |
| NM 537 | 55.943 | 90.032 | US 550 northwest of Cuba | US 64 southwest of Dulce | — | — | |
| NM 538 | 1.510 | 2.430 | US 87 in Clayton | US 56/US 64/US 412 in Clayton | — | — | |
| NM 539 | 5.840 | 9.399 | Navajo City | Navajo Dam | c. 1980 | current | |
| NM 540 | 4.400 | 7.081 | Ute Lake | US 54 in Logan | — | — | |
| NM 541 | — | — | I-25 in Albuquerque | I-40 in Albuquerque | — | 1988 | Now part of NM 423 and NM 556 |
| NM 542 | 15.200 | 24.462 | Mountainair | Estancia | c. 1980 | current | |
| NM 543 | — | — | I-25 | US 85 in Hatch | — | 1988 | Replaced by NM 26 |
| NM 543 | — | — | NM 516 in Costilla | NM 522 in Costilla | 1988 | 1988 | Turned back; now old NM 3 |
| NM 544 | — | — | Colorado State Line | NM 511 in Navajo Dam | — | 1970 | Now part of NM 511 |
| NM 544 | — | — | US 64 in Bloomfield | US 550 in Aztec | 1988 | 2000 | Renumbered from part of NM 44 in the 1988 renumbering; replaced by rerouted US 550 |
| NM 545 | 2.500 | 4.023 | Alamogordo | La Luz | — | 2005 | Deleted as part of a highway swap with Otero County for Alamogordo relief route. |
| NM 546 | 0.660 | 1.062 | NM 187 south of Derry | I-25 | — | — | |
| NM 547 | 13.010 | 20.938 | NM 122 in Grants | Coal Mine Canyon | — | — | |
| NM 548 | — | — | I-25 in Belen | Business I-25 in Belen | — | 2000 | |
| NM 549 | 31.430 | 50.582 | Business I-10 in Deming | I-10 east of Deming | — | — | Former US Route 70/80 |
| NM 551 | 6.440 | 10.364 | NM 456 near Folsom | SH 389 at the New Mexico–Colorado state line | — | — | |
| NM 552 | 1.900 | 3.058 | Ute Lake Dam | US 54 south of Logan | — | — | |
| NM 553 | — | — | US 84 in Tierra Amarilla | NM 111 in Tres Piedras | c. 1970 | 1975 | replaced by rerouted US 64 |
| NM 553 | — | — | US 285 | Lamy | 1988 | 1995 | Renumbered from part of NM 47 in the 1988 renumbering. |
| NM 554 | 21.153 | 34.042 | US 84 east of Abiquiu | NM 111 in Ojo Caliente | 1988 | current | Renumbered from part of NM 96 in the 1988 renumbering. |
| NM 555 | 31.885 | 51.314 | York Canyon Coal Mine | I-25 Business south of Raton | — | — | |
| NM 556 | 15.701 | 25.268 | Albuquerque | Albuquerque | c. 1970 | current | |
| NM 557 | — | — | US 285 north of Artesia | NM 2 in Lake Arthur | c. 1970 | — | Decommissioning date is unknown. |
| NM 558 | — | — | US 285 south of Roswell | NM 2 in Hagerman | c. 1970 | — | Decommissioning date is unknown. |
| NM 559 | — | — | Roswell Correctional Facility | US 285 south of Roswell | c. 1970 | 2007 | |
| NM 560 | — | — | US 285 south of Roswell | NM 2 in Dexter | c. 1970 | 2007 | |
| NM 561 | — | — | NM 522 | Lawrence Ranch University of New Mexico Historical Marker | — | 1994 | |
| NM 562 | 19.562 | 31.482 | Clapham | Clayton | c. 1980 | current | |
| NM 563 | — | — | NM 38 in Questa | northeast of Questa | — | 2001 | |
| NM 564 | 3.291 | 5.296 | Gallup | Gallup | — | — | |
| NM 565 | — | — | US 285 in Española | west of Española | — | 1995 | |
| NM 566 | 11.644 | 18.739 | Gallup | Churchrock Mine | — | — | |
| NM 567 | 11.819 | 19.021 | Tres Piedras | Pilar | 1988 | current | Renumbered from part of NM 96 in the 1988 renumbering. |
| NM 568 | 1.050 | 1.690 | NMDOT Transportation Yard in Milan | NM 122 in Milan | — | — | |
| NM 569 | 13.886 | 22.347 | Charette Lake | I-25 south of Springer | c. 1970 | current | |
| NM 570 | 12.531 | 20.167 | Pilar | Ranchos de Taos | 1988 | current | Renumbered from part of NM 96 and NM 96 Spur in the 1988 renumbering. |
| NM 571 | 2.000 | 3.219 | Las Placitas | El Rito | 1988 | current | Renumbered from NM 215 Spur in the 1988 renumbering. |
| NM 572 | 1.100 | 1.770 | NM 95 in Rutherton | La Puente (west of NM 112) | 1988 | current | Renumbered from part of NM 531 in the 1988 renumbering. |
| NM 573 | 2.220 | 3.573 | NM 162 in Tierra Amarilla | CR 327/CR 331 south of NM 512 near Ensenada | 1988 | current | Renumbered from part of NM 162 in the 1988 renumbering. |
| NM 574 | 14.300 | 23.014 | NM 170 in La Plata | NM 516 in Aztec | 1988 | current | Renumbered from part of NM 173 in the 1988 renumbering. |
| NM 575 | 7.986 | 12.852 | NM 173 east of Aztec | US 64 in Blanco | 1988 | current | Renumbered from NM 173 spur in the 1988 renumbering. |
| NM 576 | 0.500 | 0.805 | National Forest boundary | NM 111 in Vallecitos | 1988 | current | Established as part of a road exchange. Formerly Rio Arriba County Road 247, and before that, part of NM 100. |
| NM 577 | — | — | Arroyo Seco | Arroyo Hondo | 1988 | 1996 | Renumbered from NM 150 Spur in the 1988 renumbering. |
| NM 578 | 6.437 | 10.359 | Wheeler Peak Village | NM 38 near Red River | 1988 | current | Renumbered from part of NM 150 in the 1988 renumbering. |
| NM 579 | — | — | NM 73 in Rodarte | southeast of Rodarte | 1988 | — | Renumbered from NM 73 Spur in the 1988 renumbering. |
| NM 580 | 2.200 | 3.541 | NM 75 in Apodaca | Cañoncito | 1988 | current | Renumbered from NM 75 Spur in the 1988 renumbering. |
| NM 581 | 0.812 | 1.307 | Española | Española | 1988 | current | Renumbered from NM 399 Spur in the 1988 renumbering. |
| NM 582 | — | — | NM 74 in Chamita | Lyden | 1988 | 2003 | Renumbered from part of NM 291 in the 1988 renumbering. |
| NM 583 | 2.048 | 3.296 | Española | Española | 1988 | current | Renumbered from part of NM 106 in the 1988 renumbering. |
| NM 584 | 1.277 | 2.055 | Española | Española | 1988 | current | Renumbered from NM 68 Spur in the 1988 renumbering. |
| NM 585 | 2.208 | 3.553 | Taos | Taos | 1988 | current | Renumbered from NM 68 Spur in the 1988 renumbering. |
| NM 586 | — | — | Interstate 25 | Cerrillos | 1988 | 1992 | Renumbered from part of NM 22 in the 1988 renumbering. |
| NM 587 | — | — | Interstate 25 | La Cienega | 1988 | 2000 | Renumbered from part of NM 22 in the 1988 renumbering. |
| NM 588 | — | — | US 84/US 285 in Santa Fe | Santa Fe Airport | 1988 | 2000 | Renumbered from part of NM 22 in the 1988 renumbering. |
| NM 589 | — | — | US 84/US 285 in Santa Fe | NM 475 in Santa Fe | 1988 | 2000 | Renumbered from part of NM 22 in the 1988 renumbering. |
| NM 590 | — | — | NM 475 in Santa Fe | NM 591 in Tesuque | 1988 | 2000 | Renumbered from part of NM 22 in the 1988 renumbering. Bishops Lodge Road |
| NM 591 | — | — | US 84/US 285 south of Tesuque | US 84/US 285 north of Tesuque | 1988 | 2000 | Renumbered from part of NM 22 in the 1988 renumbering. |
| NM 592 | 5.345 | 8.602 | Tesuque | Rio en Medio | 1988 | current | Renumbered from part of NM 22 in the 1988 renumbering. |
| NM 593 | — | — | NM 475 in Santa Fe | US 84/US 285 in Santa Fe | — | 2004 | Old Taos Highway |
| NM 594 | — | — | White Rock | West of Santa Fe | — | 2013 | Unbuilt; probably a placeholder for a future route planned as a direct route between Santa Fe and Los Alamos |
| NM 595 | 25.314 | 40.739 | Regina | Lindrith | 1988 | current | Renumbered from part of NM 95 in the 1988 renumbering. |
| NM 596 | — | — | NM 503 | Santa Cruz Lake | — | 2004 | |
| NM 597 | 0.447 | 0.719 | US 160 | Four Corners Monument | c. 2000 | current | |
| NM 598 | — | — | NM 76 in Truchas | point east of Truchas | — | 2012 | |
| NM 599 | 14.019 | 22.561 | Santa Fe | Santa Fe | — | — | Also known as the Santa Fe Relief Route |
| NM 601 | 27.900 | 44.901 | US 60 near Quemado | Catron–Cibola county line | 1988 | current | Renumbered from part of NM 32 in the 1988 renumbering. |
| NM 602 | 30.724 | 49.445 | NM 53 near Ramah | US 491 in Gallup | 1988 | current | Renumbered from part of NM 32 in the 1988 renumbering. |
| NM 603 | 23.400 | 37.659 | US 60 in Pie Town | NM 36 near Quemado | 1988 | current | Renumbered from part of NM 36 in the 1988 renumbering. |
| NM 604 | — | — | NM 36 | NM 602 | 1988 | 1990 | Renumbered from part of NM 36 in the 1988 renumbering. |
| NM 605 | 22.234 | 35.782 | NM 122 in Milan | San Mateo | 1988 | current | Renumbered from part of NM 53 in the 1988 renumbering. |
| NM 606 | 1.250 | 2.012 | NM 122 near Grants | Bluewater | 1988 | current | Renumbered from part of NM 57 in the 1988 renumbering. |
| NM 607 | — | — | NM 124 in San Fidel | I-40 in San Fidel | 1988 | 1990 | Renumbered from NM 124 Spur in the 1988 renumbering. |
| NM 608 | 1.969 | 3.169 | Gallup | US 491 in Gallup | 1988 | 2017 | Renumbered from part of US 666 (now US 491) in the 1988 renumbering. Given to the city of Gallup in 2017. |
| NM 609 | 2.314 | 3.724 | US 491 in Gallup | NM 118 in Gallup | 1988 | current | Renumbered from part of NM 118 in the 1988 renumbering. |
| NM 610 | 2.020 | 3.251 | NM 602 in Gallup | NM 609 in Gallup | 1988 | current | Renumbered from part of NM 32 in the 1988 renumbering. |
| NM 612 | 9.186 | 14.783 | NM 122 in Thoreau | McKinley–Cibola county line | 1988 | current | Renumbered from NM 57 Spur in the 1988 renumbering. |
| NM 615 | 0.468 | 0.753 | Milan | NM 122 in Milan | 1988 | current | Renumbered from NM 32 Loop in the 1988 renumbering. |
| NM 789 | 135 | 217 | US 66/SR 789 at New Mexico–Arizona state line | US 666/SH 789 at New Mexico–Colorado state line | 1955 | 1965 | Part of the proposed US 789 "Canada to Mexico Highway" |
| NM 1113 | 5.325 | 8.570 | NM 9 near Antelope | Road 113 in Playas | 1995 | current | |
| NM 2001 | 0.3 | 0.48 | Scenic Drive in Alamogordo | New Mexico Museum of Space History | — | — | Was not connected to the rest of the State Road system. Decommissioning date is unknown. |
| NM 5001 | 3.224 | 5.189 | US 64 in Farmington | US 64 in Farmington | — | — | Unsigned, portion of US 64 |
| NM 6563 | 15.530 | 24.993 | NM 130 near Cloudcroft | Sacramento Peak National Solar Observatory | — | — | |
Former
