= Valmora Sanatorium Historic District =

Historic district in New Mexico, United States

- U.S. National Register of Historic Places
- U.S. Historic district
- Location within New Mexico
- Nearest city: Watrous, New Mexico
- Coordinates: 35.817081°N 104.924119°W
- Area: 5 acres (2.0 ha)
- Built: 1910, 1920
- Architect: Thomas, F. Trent; Vierra, Carlos
- Architectural style: Mission/spanish Revival, Pueblo, New Mexico Vernacular
- NRHP reference No.: 95000286
- Added to NRHP: March 23, 1995

The Valmora Sanatorium Historic District, near Watrous, New Mexico, includes building(s) dating from 1910. It was listed as a historic district on the National Register of Historic Places in 1995. The listing included nine contributing buildings and a contributing site (a park), on 5 acres (2.0 ha).

It was a tuberculosis sanatorium complex which included a hospital and cottages for patients. Surviving buildings include the hospital (1920), a dining hall, a recreation hall, two of the original cottages, and a doctor's residence.

According to signatures in surviving architectural drawings, the hospital, built in 1920, was designed by architect F. Trent Thomas and associate Carlos Vierra, apparently of Rapp, Rapp and Hendrickson. According to the NRHP nomination, "Stylistically the hospital is an amalgam of California Mission Revival (towers, gable and hip roofs, overhanging eaves, inner courtyard) and the Spanish-Pueblo Revival (asymmetry, carved corbels, portals, heavy exposed lintels, buttresses, inner courtyard), all covered with the standing-seam metal roofs characteristic of the New Mexico Vernacular."

It has also been known as Valmora Industrial Sanatorium and Valmora Medical Center, and more recently as Valmora, Inc. It still appears on maps as a small town and is further discussed on Wikipedia as Valmora, New Mexico

It is located on a creek, Wolf Creek, near its confluence with the Mora River, off New Mexico State Road 97, 4 miles (6.4 km) east of its junction with New Mexico State Road 161, northeast of Watrous.
