= New Mexico State Road 229 =

State highway in New Mexico, United States

State Road 229

Route information
- Maintained by NMDOT
- Length: 12.426 mi (19.998 km)

Major junctions
- South end: US 285 in Atoka
- US 82
- North end: US 285 in Artesia

Location
- Country: United States
- State: New Mexico
- Counties: Eddy

Highway system
- New Mexico State Highway System; Interstate; US; State; Scenic
| ← NM 228 | → NM 230 |

State Road 229 (NM 229) is a state highway in the US state of New Mexico. Its total length is approximately 12.4 miles (20.0 km). NM 229's southern terminus is at U.S. Route 285 (US 285) in Atoka, and the northern terminus is in the city of Artesia at US 285.

== Major intersections ==
| County | Location | mi | km | Destinations | Notes |
|---|---|---|---|---|---|
| Eddy | Artesia | 0.000 | 0.000 | US 285 | Northern terminus |
| Eddy | Artesia | 3.372 | 5.427 | NM 357 west | Eastern terminus of NM 357 |
| Eddy | Artesia | 4.426 | 7.123 | US 82 | |
| Eddy | Atoka | 12.426 | 19.998 | US 285 | Southern terminus |
1.000 mi = 1.609 km; 1.000 km = 0.621 mi
