= Claunch =

Claunch is a place name. Places with the surname include:

- Claunch, New Mexico

Claunch is a surname. Notable people with the surname include:

- Austin Claunch (born 1989), American college basketball coach
- Charles Kenneth Claunch (1899–1978), American government official
- Quinton Claunch (1921–2021), American musician, songwriter, record producer and record label owner
