= New Mexico State Road 159 =

State highway in New Mexico, United States

State Road 159
- Bursum Road
- NM 159 highlighted in red

Route information
- Maintained by NMDOT
- Length: 30.551 mi (49.167 km)
- Existed: 1988–present

Major junctions
- West end: US 180 south of Alma
- East end: CR 28 (Bursum Road) north of Willow Creek Campground

Location
- Country: United States
- State: New Mexico
- Counties: Catron

Highway system
- New Mexico State Highway System; Interstate; US; State; Scenic
← NM 158	→ US 160

State Road 159 (NM 159) is a 30.551-mile (49.167 km) state road located entirely within Catron County, New Mexico, United States. NM 159's western terminus is at U.S. Route 180 (US 180) south of Alma. It heads east via Mogollon to a few miles past Willow Creek Campground in Gila National Forest where it continues as Catron County Route 28 (CR 28), which is also known as Bursum Road.

== Route description ==
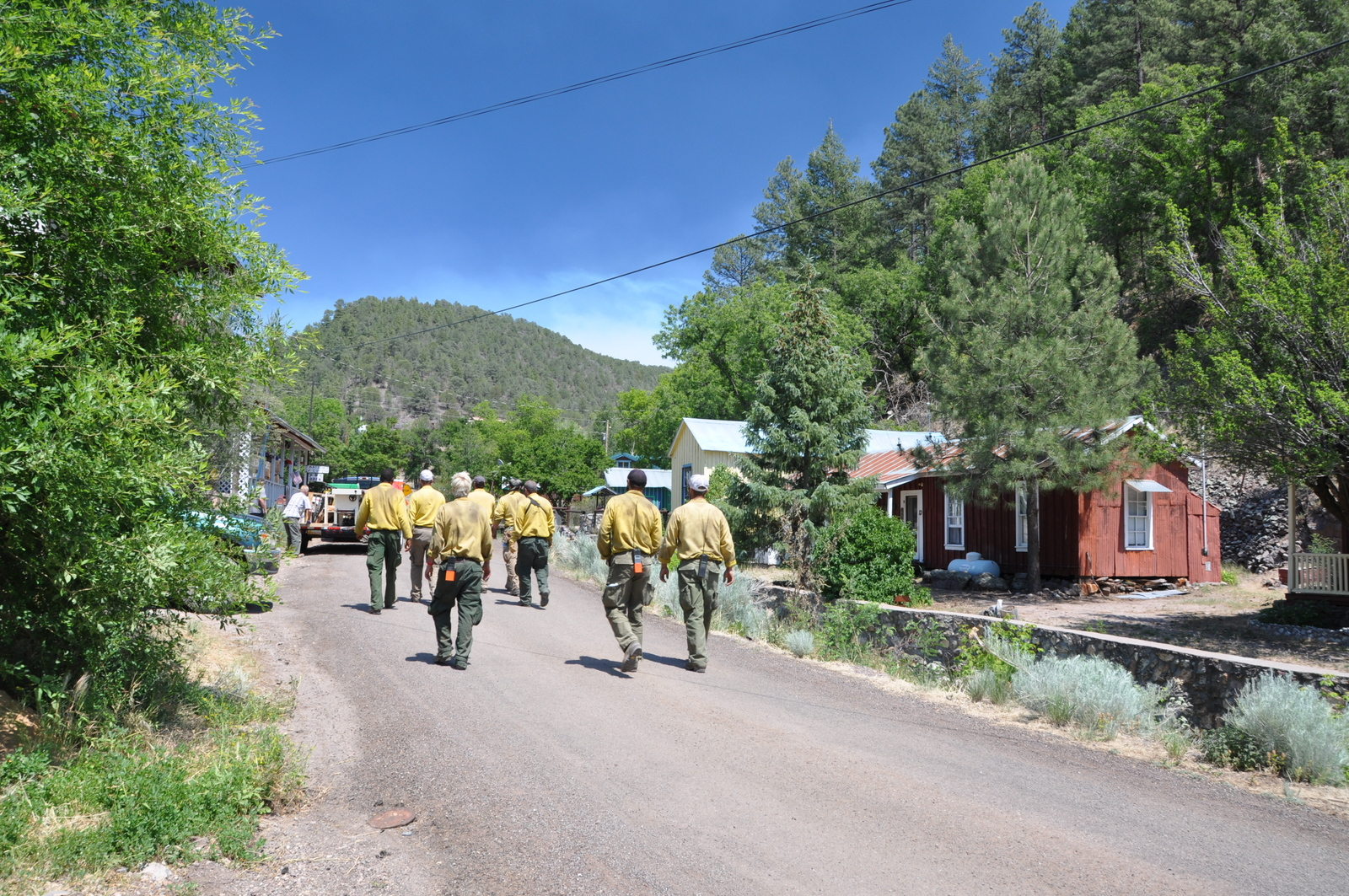
Firefighters walking east on NM 159 in Mogollon, during the Whitewater–Baldy complex Fire, June 2012

NM 159 begins at a junction with US 180 between the communities of Alma to the north and Glenwood to the south. The route heads east-northeast through a sparsely populated semi-arid region until it reaches a junction with Forestry Trail 586, which goes south to NM 174. Past this junction, the route continues its east-northeast trajectory into a mountainous area. After following a winding path through the mountains, the highway reaches Mogollon, a historic mining town.

East of Mogollon, the highway becomes an unpaved, rough single-lane road known as Bursum Road. This section of the road is also twisting and mountainous, and it is closed in winter due to the risk of icy, snowy conditions. The road continues east to Willow Creek Campground in Gila National Forest, where state maintenance ends.

== Major intersections ==
The entire route is in Gila National Forest, Catron County.

mi	km	Destinations	Notes
0.000	0.000	US 180 south – Silver City, Deming US 180 north – Reserve, Luna	Western terminus Continuation west as Forest Road 106
30.551	49.167	CR 28 east (Bursum Road)	Eastern terminus Continuation east as CR 28 (Bursum Road) toward NM 163
1.000 mi = 1.609 km; 1.000 km = 0.621 mi

== See also ==
- List of state roads in New Mexico
