= New Mexico State Road 58 =

State highway in New Mexico, United States

State Road 58
- NM 58 highlighted in red

Route information
- Maintained by NMDOT
- Length: 18.909 mi (30.431 km)

Major junctions
- West end: US 64 at Cimarron
- East end: I-25 / US 85

Location
- Country: United States
- State: New Mexico
- County: Colfax

Highway system
- New Mexico State Highway System; Interstate; US; State; Scenic
← NM 57	→ NM 59

State Road 58 (NM 58) is a state highway in the US state of New Mexico. Its total length is approximately 18.9 miles (30.4 km). NM 58's western terminus is at U.S. Route 64 (US 64), and the eastern terminus is at Interstate 25 (I-25).

== Major intersections ==
The entire route is in Colfax County.

Location	mi	km	Destinations	Notes
Cimarron	0.000	0.000	US 64	Western terminus
	18.909	30.431	I-25 / US 85 – Springer, Raton	Eastern terminus
1.000 mi = 1.609 km; 1.000 km = 0.621 mi
