= New Mexico State Road 57 =

State highway in New Mexico, United States

State Road 57

Route information
- Maintained by NMDOT
- Length: 27.640 mi (44.482 km)

Major junctions
- South end: Navajo Route 14 at the San Juan–McKinley county line
- North end: US 550 northwest of Nageezi

Location
- Country: United States
- State: New Mexico
- Counties: San Juan

Highway system
- New Mexico State Highway System; Interstate; US; State; Scenic
← US 56	→ NM 58

State Road 57 (NM 57) is a state highway in the US state of New Mexico. Its total length is approximately 27.6 miles (44.4 km). NM 57's southern terminus is at the San Juan–McKinley county line where it continues south as Navajo Route 14, and NM 57's northern terminus is at U.S. Route 550 (US 550) northwest of Nageezi.

== History ==
NM 57 was originally NM 56, but was renumbered to NM 57 to avoid confusion with US 56. From 1970 to 1988 the southern terminus was at NM 53 west of Ice Cave. After the 1988 statewide renumbering NM 57 extended from Interstate 40 (I-40) to NM 44, which is now US 550. The segment from Milan to NM 53 around the Ice Cave was removed from the state highway system in 1988. Then in 1989, the portion of NM 57 between Chaco Canyon and Crownpoint were removed from the state highway system and are now Indian Routes. The portion south of Crownpoint is now part of NM 371. The portion in McKinley County from NM 371 eastward to Navajo Route 14 became Navajo Route 9 in a road exchange agreement on July 1, 1989.

== Major intersections ==
The entire route is in San Juan County.

Location	mi	km	Destinations	Notes
	0.000	0.000	Navajo Route 14	McKinley County line; southern terminus
	27.640	44.482	US 550	Northern terminus
1.000 mi = 1.609 km; 1.000 km = 0.621 mi
