= New Mexico State Road 169 =

State highway in Socorro County, New Mexico, United States

State Road 169
- NM 169 highlighted in red

Route information
- Maintained by NMDOT
- Length: 35.700 mi (57.454 km)

Major junctions
- South end: US 60 in Magdalena
- North end: End of state maintenance near Alamo

Location
- Country: United States
- State: New Mexico
- Counties: Socorro

Highway system
- New Mexico State Highway System; Interstate; US; State; Scenic
← NM 168	→ NM 170

State Road 169 (NM 169) is a 35.7-mile-long (57.5 km) state highway in the US state of New Mexico. NM 169's southern terminus is at U.S. Route 60 (US 60) in Magdalena, and the northern terminus is at the end of state maintenance east of Alamo.

== Major intersections ==
The entire route is in Socorro County.

Location	mi	km	Destinations	Notes
Magdalena	0.000	0.000	US 60 – Datil, Socorro	Southern terminus
	35.700	57.454	End of state maintenance	Northern terminus
1.000 mi = 1.609 km; 1.000 km = 0.621 mi
