= New Mexico State Road 127 =

State highway in New Mexico, United States

State Road 127
- NM 127 highlighted in red

Route information
- Maintained by NMDOT
- Length: 3.530 mi (5.681 km)

Major junctions
- East end: US 64 in Eagle Nest
- West end: End of state maintenance by Idlewild

Location
- Country: United States
- State: New Mexico
- Counties: Colfax

Highway system
- New Mexico State Highway System; Interstate; US; State; Scenic
← NM 126	→ NM 128

State Road 127 (NM 127) is a 3.5-mile-long (5.6 km) state highway in the US state of New Mexico. NM 127's eastern terminus is at U.S. Route 64 (US 64) in Eagle Nest, and the western terminus is at the end of state maintenance near Idlewild.

== Major intersections ==
The entire route is in Colfax County.

Location	mi	km	Destinations	Notes
Eagle Nest	0.000	0.000	US 64	Eastern terminus
	3.530	5.681	End of state maintenance	Western terminus
1.000 mi = 1.609 km; 1.000 km = 0.621 mi
