= New Mexico State Road 161 =

State highway in New Mexico, United States

State Road 161
- NM 161 highlighted in red

Route information
- Maintained by NMDOT
- Length: 31.902 mi (51.341 km)

Major junctions
- CW end: NM 518 near La Cueva
- I-25 / US 85 near Watrous; NM 97 in Watrous
- CCW end: Fort Union National Monument

Location
- Country: United States
- State: New Mexico
- Counties: Mora

Highway system
- New Mexico State Highway System; Interstate; US; State; Scenic
← US 160	→ NM 162

State Road 161 (NM 161) is a 31.902-mile-long (51.341 km) state highway in northeastern New Mexico. NM 161 begins in the west at its junction with NM 518 several miles south of the unincorporated community of La Cueva. The road travels southeast through remote, sparsely populated land before reaching a junction with Interstate 25 (I-25) south of Watrous. From there, the road turns northeast and briefly parallels I-25 before cutting back to the northwest, where it intersects I-25 again, then continues north for roughly seven miles before terminating at Fort Union National Monument. Shortly before reaching Fort Union, New Mexico, NM 161 crosses the former path of the Santa Fe Trail, which is still visible as a broad, shallow ditch or low spot in the terrain.

== Major intersections ==
The entire route is in Mora County.

Location	mi	km	Destinations	Notes
Buena Vista	0.000	0.000	NM 518 / Santa Fe Trail Scenic Byway – Las Vegas, Mora	Clockwise terminus
	21.758	35.016	I-25 (US 85) – Raton, Las Vegas	I-25 exit 364
Watrous	22.758	36.625	NM 97 east – Valmora	Western terminus of NM 97
	23.717	38.169	I-25 (US 85) – Raton, Las Vegas	I-25 exit 366
	23.8	38.3	Frontage Road / Santa Fe Trail Scenic Byway	State-maintained; former US 85
	31.902	51.341	Fort Union National Monument	Counterclockwise terminus
1.000 mi = 1.609 km; 1.000 km = 0.621 mi
