= New Mexico State Road 357 =

State highway in New Mexico, United States

State Road 357
- Richey Avenue

Route information
- Maintained by NMDOT
- Length: 3.95 mi (6.36 km)

Major junctions
- East end: NM 229 in Artesia
- US 285
- West end: 26th Street in Artesia

Location
- Country: United States
- State: New Mexico
- Counties: Eddy

Highway system
- New Mexico State Highway System; Interstate; US; State; Scenic
← NM 356	→ NM 359

State Road 357 (NM 357) is a state highway in the US state of New Mexico. Its total length is approximately 3.95 miles (6.36 km). NM 357's eastern terminus is in the city of Artesia at NM 229 (NM 229), and the western terminus is 26th street in Artesia. NM 357 is also known as Richey Avenue.

== Major intersections ==
The entire route is in Artesia, Eddy County.

mi	km	Destinations	Notes
0.000	0.000	NM 229	Eastern terminus
2.120	3.412	US 285	
3.950	6.357	26th Street	Western terminus
1.000 mi = 1.609 km; 1.000 km = 0.621 mi
