= New Mexico State Road 175 =

State highway in New Mexico, United States

State Road 175

Route information
- Maintained by NMDOT
- Length: 1.6 mi (2.6 km)

Major junctions
- West end: Gulf Road near Oil Center
- East end: NM 8 near Oil Center

Location
- Country: United States
- State: New Mexico
- Counties: Lea

Highway system
- New Mexico State Highway System; Interstate; US; State; Scenic
← NM 174	→ NM 176

State Road 175 (NM 175) is a 1.6-mile-long (2.6 km) state highway in the US state of New Mexico. NM 175's western terminus is at Gulf Road northwest of Oil Center, and the eastern terminus is at NM 8 north of Oil Center.

== Major intersections ==
The entire route is in Lea County.

Location	mi	km	Destinations	Notes
	0.000	0.000	Gulf Road	Western terminus
	1.600	2.575	NM 8	Eastern terminus
1.000 mi = 1.609 km; 1.000 km = 0.621 mi
