= New Mexico State Road 25 =

State highway in New Mexico, United States

State Road 25

Route information
- Maintained by NMDOT
- Existed: mid 1930s–1968

Major junctions
- South end: US 180 in Silver City
- North end: NM 61 near Mimbres

Location
- Country: United States
- State: New Mexico
- Counties: Rio Arriba

Highway system
- New Mexico State Highway System; Interstate; US; State; Scenic
← I-25	→ NM 26

State Road 25 (NM 25) was a state highway in the US state of New Mexico. NM 25's southern terminus was at U.S. Route 180 (US 180) in Silver City, and the northern terminus was at NM 61 north of Mimbres. It was established in the late-1930s as NM 187 then changed to NM 25 in the 1940s. Then it was renumbered in 1968 as NM 15 and NM 35 to avoid a number conflict with Interstate 25 (I-25).
