= La Madera, Rio Arriba County, New Mexico =

La Madera, New Mexico
- Census-designated place
- Location within New Mexico Location within the United States
- Coordinates: 36°22′25″N 106°02′29″W
- Country: United States
- State: New Mexico
- County: Rio Arriba

Area
  - Total: 4.439 sq mi (11.50 km^{2})
  - Land: 4.439 sq mi (11.50 km^{2})
  - Water: 0 sq mi (0 km^{2})
- Elevation: 6,483 ft (1,976 m)

Population (2010)
  - Total: 154
  - Density: 34.7/sq mi (13.4/km^{2})
- Time zone: UTC−07:00 (Mountain (MST))
  - Summer (DST): UTC−06:00 (MDT)
- ZIP Code: 87539
- Area code: 575
- GNIS feature ID: 2584129

La Madera is a census-designated place in Rio Arriba County, New Mexico, United States. Its population was 154 as of the 2010 census. La Madera has a post office with ZIP Code 87539.

La Madera used to be a thriving lumber town in the 1900s which since has had a decline in population.

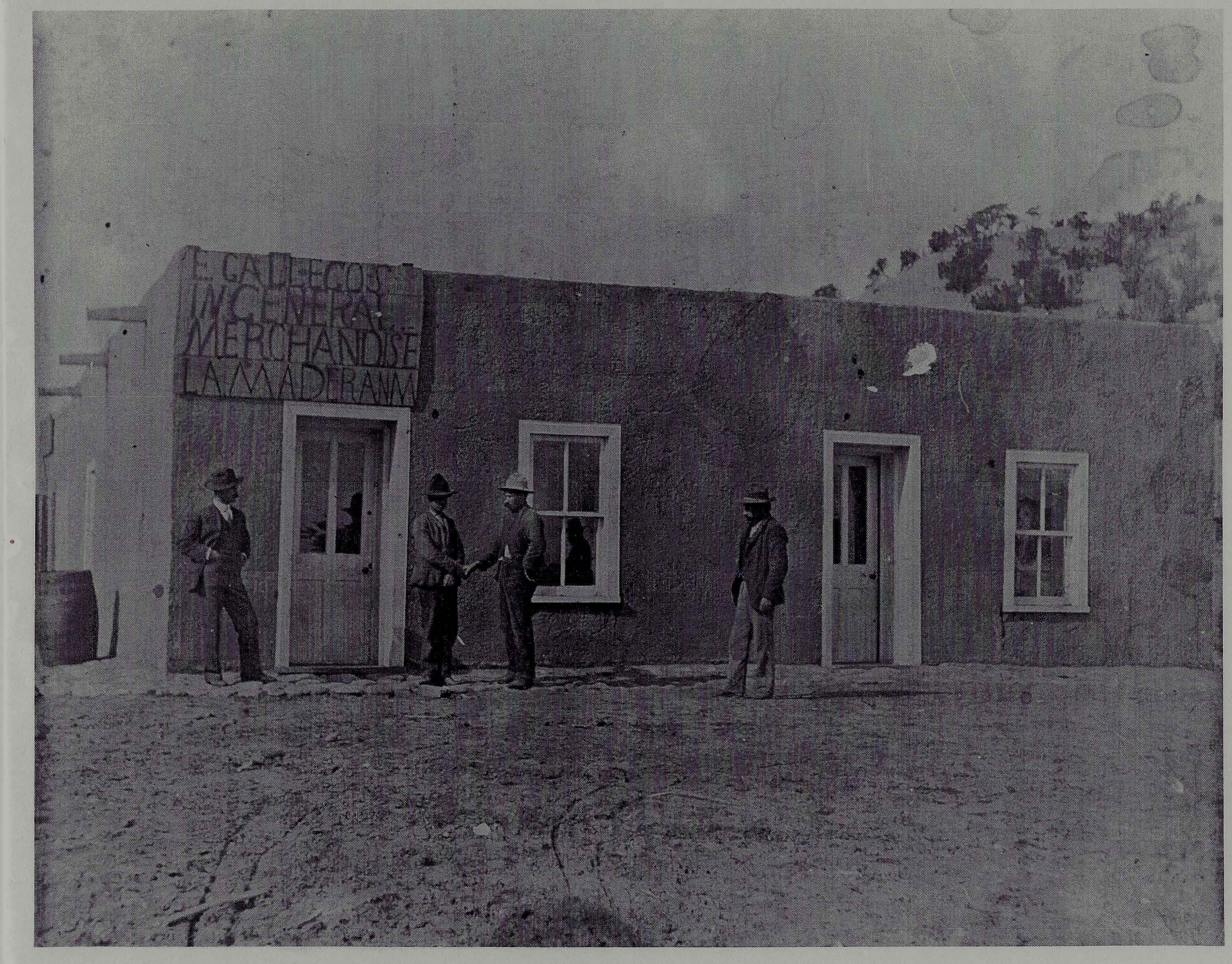
Gallegos General Store

== Geography ==
According to the U.S. Census Bureau, the community has an area of 4.439 square miles (11.50 km^{2}), all land.

La Madera is a community located in the mountains of northern New Mexico and nestled within the confines of the Kit Carson National Forest. The village is surrounded by many of the existing Hispano communities which populated the area during the 18th and 19th centuries. The topographical layout of the village is consistent with that of many of the small towns and villages of the region: a fertile valley surrounded by high volcanic scarps descending from the surrounding mesas.

== History ==
Sacramental records for the pueblo church at Abiquiu, province of New Mexico, often referred to a settlement Nuestra Señora de Guadalupe de la Cueva. This hamlet probably served as the initial source of settlers that later formed the future village of La Cañada de La Madera approximately two miles due north of this site. At some point in time in the early 1900s, the name of the village of La Cueva was changed to Cañada de La Madera. The first US Post Office was established under the name of La Madera, rumored in order to accommodate postal authorities. The first postmaster, Elias Gallegos, was appointed on July 9, 1906. The post office was operated within the mercantile store that Elias Gallegos had previously built.

The settlement's economy changed dramatically by 1912 when the Hallack and Howard Lumber Company of Denver opened a sawmill to provide lumber for the company's western and mid-western clientele. The company built two large logging camps, which served as a source of timber harvested from permitted Federal Government land in the nearby Carson National Forest. Hallack and Howard financed the construction of a narrow gauge rail spur from the La Madera operation to the D&RG Railroad connection at Taos Junction. The cut logs were transported by the company's own locomotives to the rail spur head at Tres Piedras. The lumber company also constructed permanent housing for its employees as well as a primary school and commissary.

Since the settlement of La Cueva, province of New Mexico, was not a result of a formal land grant with specific assignment of land parcels to original grantees, the analysis of the initial pobadores will be made in a sequential manner starting with the year 1822.
