= New Mexico State Road 174 =

State highway in New Mexico, United States

State Road 174
- Cat Walk Road
- NM 174 highlighted in red

Route information
- Maintained by NMDOT
- Length: 5.000 mi (8.047 km)

Major junctions
- South end: US 180 in Glenwood
- North end: End of road at Catwalk Recreation Area

Location
- Country: United States
- State: New Mexico
- Counties: Catron

Highway system
- New Mexico State Highway System; Interstate; US; State; Scenic
| ← NM 173 | → NM 175 |

State Road 174 (NM 174), also known as Cat Walk Road, is a 5.000-mile (8.047 km) state highway in Catron County, New Mexico, United States, that connects U.S. Route 180 (US 180) in Glenwood with the Catwalk Recreation Area (southwest of Mogollon).

== Major intersections ==
The entire route is in Catron County.

| Location | mi | km | Destinations | Notes |
|---|---|---|---|---|
| Glenwood | 0.000 | 0.000 | US 180 north – Reserve, Luna US 180 south – Cliff, Silver City | Southern terminus: T-intersection |
| | 5.000 | 8.047 | Catwalk Recreation Area | Northern terminus; Dead end road |
1.000 mi = 1.609 km; 1.000 km = 0.621 mi

== See also ==
- List of state roads in New Mexico
