= Blanco Trading Post, New Mexico =

Coordinates: 36.3598°N 107.8103°W

Blanco Trading Post (Navajo: Tsii' Łizhin) was located along U.S. highway 550 in northwest New Mexico in San Juan County.

Justin and Savannah Higgins were fourth-generation traders, and Blanco had been dealing and trading with Navajos and tourists since the 1920s, when Wilfred “Tabby” and Jim Brimhall established the post.

The store closed in 2010, and local oilman Tom Dugan, founder of Dugan Production Corp., purchased the trading post in April 2012. The site is now a private lot used to park vehicles and store equipment.

In Tony Hillerman's book A Thief of Time, his eighth mystery novel featuring the Navajo Nation Police, anthropologist Eleanor Friedman-Bernal dropped off her mail at the post before disappearing.
