= Mount Dora, New Mexico =

Mount Dora
- Unincorporated community
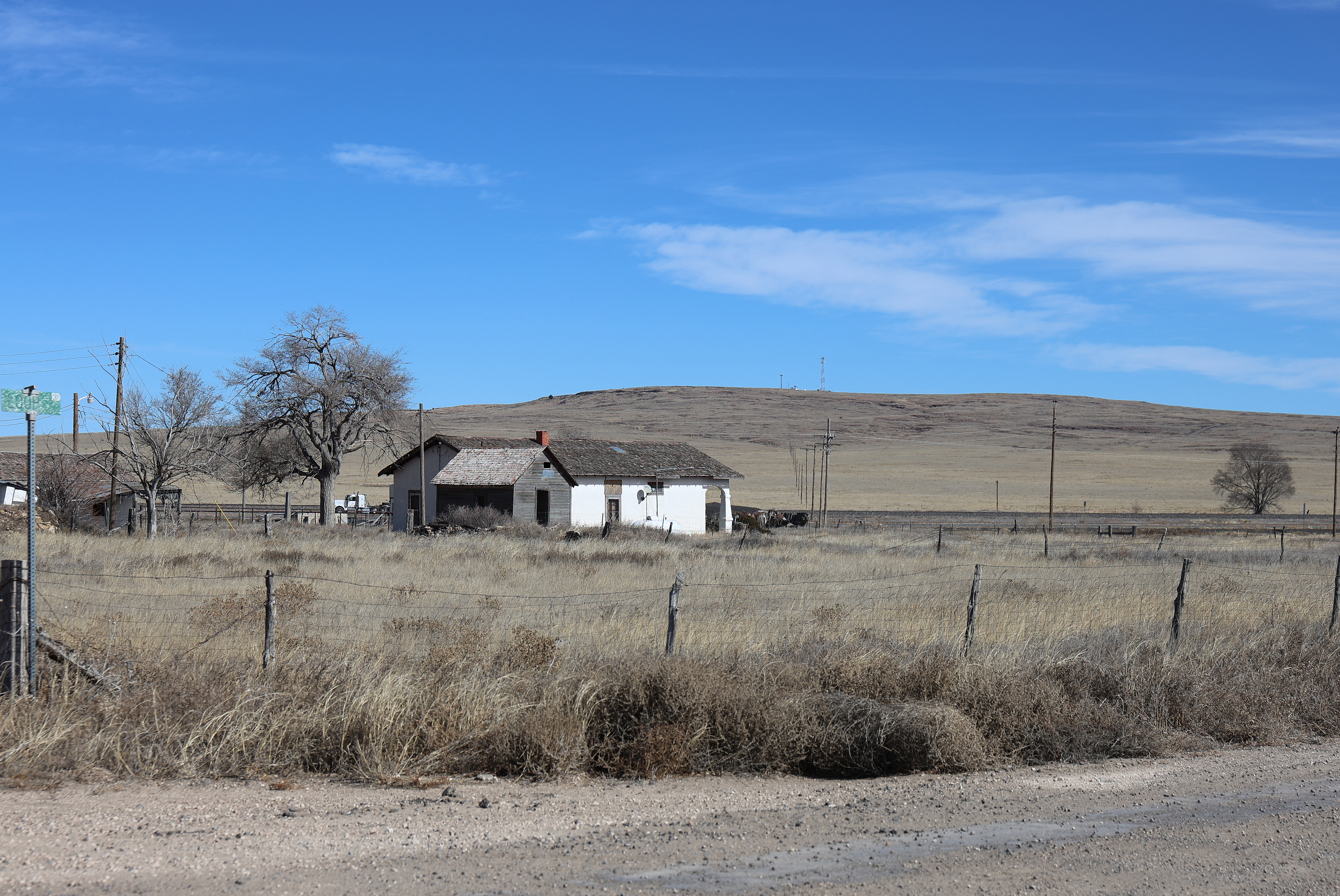
- The community of Mount Dora (foreground) and the mountain

- Location within the state of New Mexico Mount Dora (the United States)
- Coordinates: 36°31′10″N 103°29′21″W
- Country: United States
- State: New Mexico
- County: Union
- Elevation: 5,715 ft (1,742 m)
- Time zone: UTC-7 (Mountain (MST))
  - Summer (DST): UTC-6 (MDT)
- Area code: 575
- GNIS feature ID: 899609

Mount Dora is an unincorporated community located in Union County, New Mexico, United States. The community is located along U.S. routes 64 and 87, 17.6 miles (28.3 km) west-northwest of Clayton. Mount Dora had its own post office from April 10, 1908, until November 2, 2002. It was named Mount Dora by Senator Stephen W. Dorsey after his sister-in-law.
