= Gladstone, New Mexico =

Gladstone
- Unincorporated community
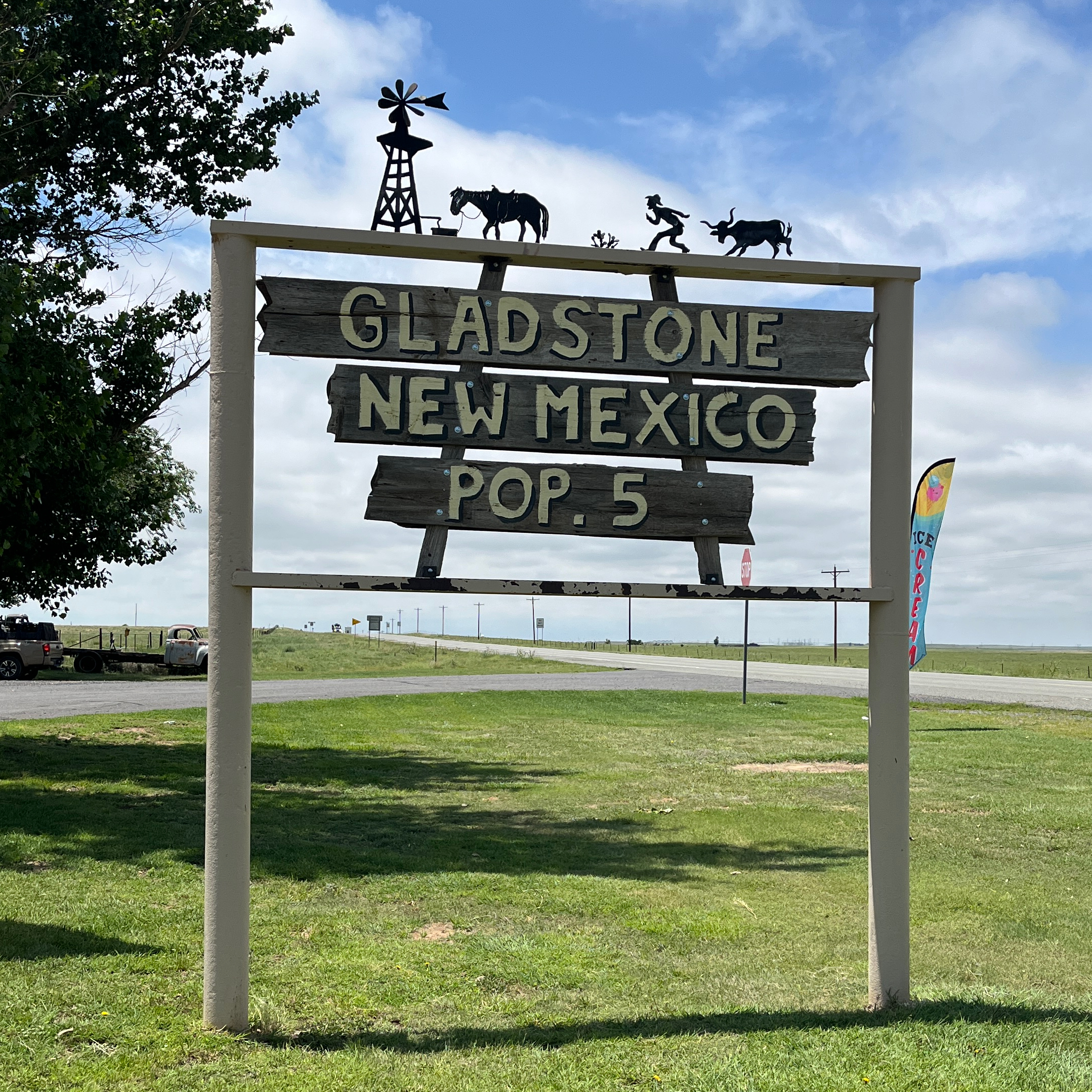

- Location within the state of New Mexico Gladstone (the United States)
- Coordinates: 36°18′17″N 103°58′23″W
- Country: United States
- State: New Mexico
- County: Union
- Elevation: 5,883 ft (1,793 m)

Population (2000)
  - Total: 5
- Time zone: UTC-7 (Mountain (MST))
  - Summer (DST): UTC-6 (MDT)
- ZIP codes: 88422
- Area code: 575
- GNIS feature ID: 898549

Gladstone is an unincorporated community in Union County, New Mexico, United States, founded in 1880. It lies at the intersection of US Route 56 and Union County Road C001. The post office, which opened in 1888, closed in 2010.

== History ==
Gladstone was founded in 1880 by William H. Harris, an Englishman, who hoped to set up a Utopian religious community called "Gladstone Colony". He named it in honor of William Ewart Gladstone, a Liberal politician and the British Prime Minister at the time. A fair number of settlers came to Gladstone, but many left disillusioned shortly thereafter.

== Climate ==
According to the Köppen Climate Classification system, Gladstone has a semi-arid climate, abbreviated "BSk" on climate maps. The hottest temperature recorded in Gladstone was 104 °F (40.0 °C) on June 29, 1957, while the coldest temperature recorded was −26 °F (−32.2 °C) on January 13, 1963.

Climate data for Pasamonte, New Mexico, 1991–2020 normals, extremes 1925–present
Month	Jan	Feb	Mar	Apr	May	Jun	Jul	Aug	Sep	Oct	Nov	Dec	Year
Record high °F (°C)	77 (25)	80 (27)	83 (28)	90 (32)	97 (36)	104 (40)	103 (39)	101 (38)	99 (37)	89 (32)	84 (29)	78 (26)	104 (40)
Mean maximum °F (°C)	67.2 (19.6)	69.0 (20.6)	77.0 (25.0)	80.9 (27.2)	88.3 (31.3)	95.5 (35.3)	96.7 (35.9)	93.7 (34.3)	90.5 (32.5)	84.2 (29.0)	75.1 (23.9)	67.9 (19.9)	98.2 (36.8)
Mean daily maximum °F (°C)	47.0 (8.3)	50.0 (10.0)	57.7 (14.3)	65.1 (18.4)	74.0 (23.3)	84.0 (28.9)	87.4 (30.8)	87.6 (30.9)	78.3 (25.7)	67.5 (19.7)	55.8 (13.2)	46.7 (8.2)	66.8 (19.3)
Daily mean °F (°C)	31.9 (−0.1)	34.2 (1.2)	41.8 (5.4)	48.5 (9.2)	58.2 (14.6)	67.9 (19.9)	71.9 (22.2)	70.0 (21.1)	63.1 (17.3)	51.6 (10.9)	40.0 (4.4)	31.9 (−0.1)	50.9 (10.5)
Mean daily minimum °F (°C)	16.9 (−8.4)	18.5 (−7.5)	25.3 (−3.7)	32.0 (0.0)	42.4 (5.8)	51.8 (11.0)	56.4 (13.6)	55.5 (13.1)	48.0 (8.9)	35.7 (2.1)	24.1 (−4.4)	17.0 (−8.3)	35.3 (1.9)
Mean minimum °F (°C)	2.4 (−16.4)	3.2 (−16.0)	9.9 (−12.3)	19.1 (−7.2)	30.0 (−1.1)	42.8 (6.0)	50.8 (10.4)	49.6 (9.8)	35.8 (2.1)	19.8 (−6.8)	9.4 (−12.6)	1.1 (−17.2)	−3.5 (−19.7)
Record low °F (°C)	−26 (−32)	−19 (−28)	−11 (−24)	5 (−15)	16 (−9)	32 (0)	39 (4)	35 (2)	25 (−4)	0 (−18)	−15 (−26)	−23 (−31)	−26 (−32)
Average precipitation inches (mm)	0.30 (7.6)	0.27 (6.9)	0.68 (17)	0.90 (23)	1.81 (46)	1.65 (42)	2.97 (75)	3.20 (81)	1.73 (44)	0.96 (24)	0.36 (9.1)	0.41 (10)	15.24 (385.6)
Average snowfall inches (cm)	4.1 (10)	3.1 (7.9)	4.0 (10)	1.6 (4.1)	0.3 (0.76)	0.0 (0.0)	0.0 (0.0)	0.0 (0.0)	0.0 (0.0)	1.2 (3.0)	2.8 (7.1)	3.4 (8.6)	20.5 (51.46)
Average precipitation days (≥ 0.01 in)	2.0	1.9	4.0	4.5	6.4	7.2	9.7	9.6	5.3	3.5	2.6	2.7	59.4
Average snowy days (≥ 0.1 in)	1.7	1.7	1.8	0.8	0.1	0.0	0.0	0.0	0.0	0.4	1.3	2.0	9.8
Source 1: NOAA
Source 2: National Weather Service
