= El Porvenir, New Mexico =

- Unincorporated community
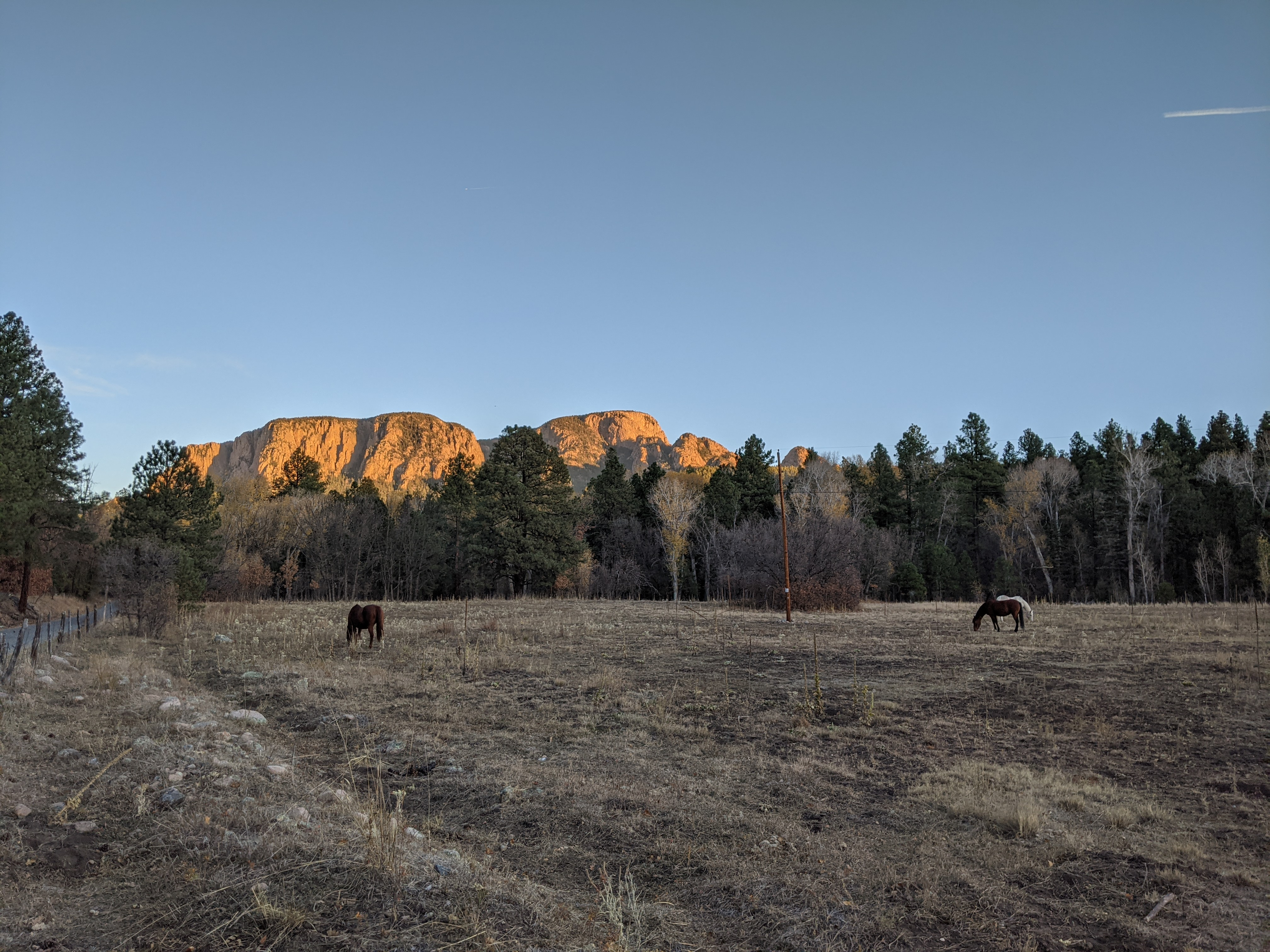
- NM Highway 65 passing through El Porvenir, New Mexico. Hermit Peak is visible in the distance.

- Location within New Mexico
- Coordinates: 35°41′48″N 105°22′58″W
- Country: United States
- State: New Mexico
- County: San Miguel
- Elevation: 7,290 ft (2,220 m)
- Time zone: UTC-7 (Mountain (MST))
  - Summer (DST): UTC-6 (MDT)
- Area code: 505
- GNIS feature ID: 906073

El Porvenir is an unincorporated community in San Miguel County, New Mexico, United States.
