= New Mexico State Road 97 =

State highway in New Mexico, United States

State Road 97
- NM 97 highlighted in red

Route information
- Maintained by NMDOT
- Length: 9.536 mi (15.347 km)

Major junctions
- West end: NM 161 in Watrous
- East end: Southeast of Shoemaker

Location
- Country: United States
- State: New Mexico
- County: Mora

Highway system
- New Mexico State Highway System; Interstate; US; State; Scenic
← NM 96	→ NM 101

State Road 97 (NM 97) is a state highway in the US state of New Mexico. Its total length is approximately 9.5 miles (15.3 km). NM 97's western terminus is NM 161 in Watrous, and the eastern terminus is past the NM 450 intersection where the state maintenance ends.

== Major intersections ==
The entire route is in Mora County.

Location	mi	km	Destinations	Notes
Watrous	0.000	0.000	NM 161	Western terminus
	4.850	7.805	NM 446 north	Southern terminus of NM 446
	6.877	11.067	NM 450 north	Southern terminus of NM 450
	9.536	15.347	Eastern terminus	
1.000 mi = 1.609 km; 1.000 km = 0.621 mi
