= Claunch, New Mexico =

- Unincorporated community
- Location within New Mexico
- Coordinates: 34°08′31″N 105°59′40″W
- Country: United States
- State: New Mexico
- County: Socorro
- Elevation: 6,217 ft (1,895 m)
- Time zone: UTC-7 (Mountain (MST))
  - Summer (DST): UTC-6 (MDT)
- ZIP code: 87011
- Area code: 575
- GNIS feature ID: 905190

Claunch is an unincorporated community in Socorro County, New Mexico, United States. Claunch is located on New Mexico State Road 55 in the easternmost region of Socorro County. Claunch has a post office with ZIP code 87011.

== History ==
A post office has been in operation at Claunch since 1930. The community was named for L. H. Claunch, a cattleman.
