= Atoka, New Mexico =

- Census-designated place
- Location within New Mexico
- Coordinates: 32°46′40″N 104°23′20″W
- Country: United States
- State: New Mexico
- County: Eddy

Area
  - Total: 6.79 sq mi (17.59 km^{2})
  - Land: 6.76 sq mi (17.51 km^{2})
  - Water: 0.031 sq mi (0.08 km^{2})
- Elevation: 3,370 ft (1,030 m)

Population (2020)
  - Total: 1,153
  - Density: 170.6/sq mi (65.85/km^{2})
- Time zone: UTC-7 (Mountain (MST))
  - Summer (DST): UTC-6 (MDT)
- Area code: 575
- GNIS feature ID: 2584053

Atoka is a census-designated place in Eddy County, New Mexico, United States. As of the 2020 census, Atoka had a population of 1,153. U.S. Route 285 passes through the community. The name was derived from a Native American word, probably Choctaw, whose meaning is unknown.

It is within the Artesia Public Schools school district. Artesia High School is the school district's sole comprehensive high school.

== Demographics ==
Historical population
Census	Pop.	Note	%±
2020	1,153		—
U.S. Decennial Census
