= Valmora, New Mexico =

Unincorporated community in New Mexico, United States

- Unincorporated community
- Location within New Mexico Location within the United States
- Coordinates: 35°48′59″N 104°55′23″W
- Country: United States
- State: New Mexico
- County: Mora
- Elevation: 6,358 ft (1,938 m)
- Time zone: UTC-7 (Mountain (MST))
  - Summer (DST): UTC-6 (MDT)
- ZIP codes: 87750
- Area code: 575
- GNIS feature ID: 899980

Valmora is an unincorporated community located in Mora County, New Mexico, United States. The community is located along New Mexico State Road 97, 3.75 miles (6.04 km) east-northeast of Watrous. State Road 446, the shortest state road in New Mexico at .25 miles (0.40 km), links the community to State Road 97. It was founded in 1916 when a tuberculosis sanitarium was established.

== History ==
The name "Valmora" was coined to mean "in the valley of the Mora river." It was founded in 1916 as a community serving a tuberculosis sanitarium, long since closed. Because of this, however, in 1995 Valmora was added to the registry of National Historic Places.
