= New Mexico State Road 531 =

State highway in Rio Arriba County, New Mexico, United States

State Road 531
- NM 531 highlighted in red

Route information
- Maintained by NMDOT
- Length: 3.300 mi (5.311 km)

Major junctions
- West end: NM 572 / CR 340 in La Puente
- NM 112 in Tierra Amarilla; US 64 / US 84 in Tierra Amarilla
- East end: NM 162 in Tierra Amarilla

Location
- Country: United States
- State: New Mexico
- Counties: Rio Arriba

Highway system
- New Mexico State Highway System; Interstate; US; State; Scenic
← NM 529	→ NM 532

State Road 531 (NM 531) is a 3.300-mile (5.311 km) state highway in Rio Arriba County, New Mexico, United States, that connects New Mexico State Road 572 (NM 572) and County Road 340 (CR 340) in La Puente with New Mexico State Road 162 (NM 162) in Tierra Amarilla.

== Route description ==
NM 531 begins at a T intersection with NM 572 and CR 340 in the unincorporated community of La Puente. (CR 340 heads northwesterly to Los Ojos and northbound NM 572 officially heads west to promptly ford the Rio Chama and on through Plaza Blanca to end at New Mexico State Road 95 [NM 95]. However, after NM 95 was extended west from Rutheron in 1969, the state has not maintained the river crossing [nor the adjacent sections of dirt road] along NM 572. Therefore, the ford of the Rio Chama is likely impassable.)

From its western terminus NM 153 heads easterly as a two-lane asphalt paved road to pass through the La Puente Historic District and leaves La Puente. Just over 1 mile (1.6 km) along its route, NM 153 crosses New Mexico State Road 112 (NM 112) at an intersection on the westernmost edge of the census-designated place of Terria Amarilla, immediately west of the Tierra Amarilla Elementary School. (NM 112 heads north toward Los Ojos and south toward El Vado.)

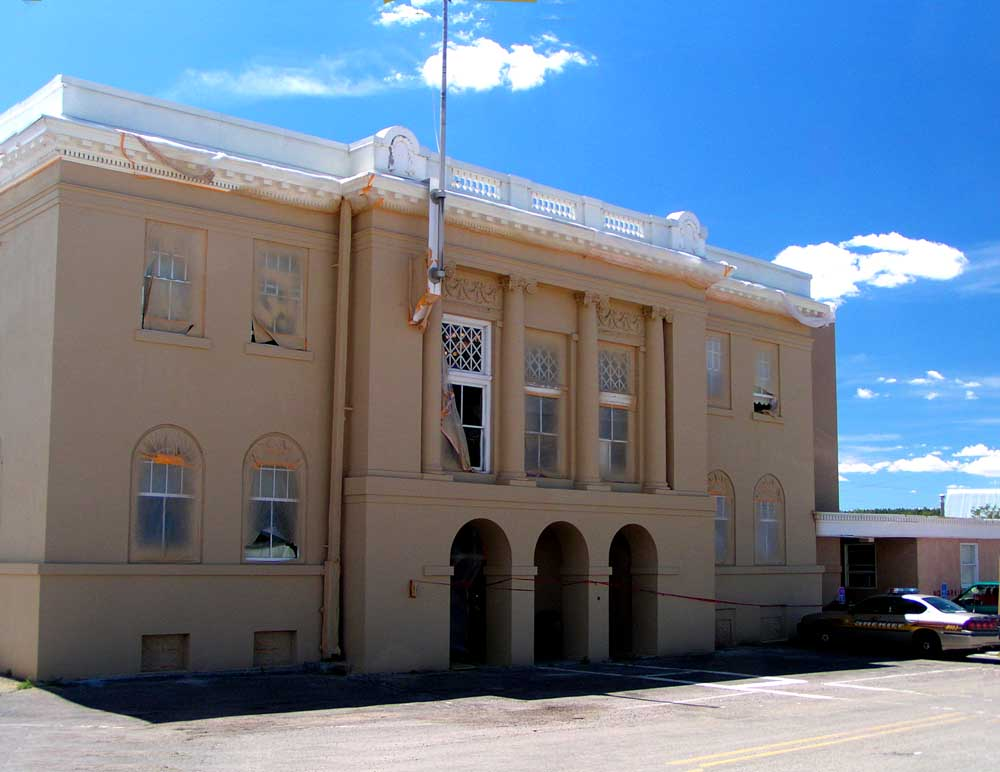
The Rio Arriba County Courthouse, located the junction of NM 531 and NM 162 within the Tierra Amarilla Historic District in downtown Tierra Amarilla

East of its NM 112 junction, NM 153 enters Tierra Amarilla and, just after passing the Escalante High School, enters the Tierra Amarilla Historic District. NM 531 then crosses U.S. Route 64 / US 84 (US 64 / US 84) 1.1 miles (1.8 km) later. (Eastbound US 64 / US 84 heads south toward Tres Piedras, Española, Taos, and Santa Fe. Westbound US 64 / US 84 heads north toward Chama.) One-half mile (0.80 km) farther east NM 153 reaches its eastern terminus at a T intersection with NM 162 in downtown Tierra Amarilla, and still within the Tierra Amarilla Historic District. (NM 162, which forms an eastern loop off of US 84, heads north toward 64 / US 84 and south toward 64 and then US 84.)

== Major intersections ==
Mile markers increase from east to west.

The entire route is in Rio Arriba County.

Location	mi	km	Destinations	Notes
La Puente	0.000	0.000	CR 340 north – Los Ojos	Continuation north from western terminus
La Puente	0.000	0.000	NM 572 west – Plaza Blanca, NM 95	Western terminus T intersection
Tierra Amarilla	1.100	1.770	NM 112 north – Los Ojos NM 112 south – El Vado	
Tierra Amarilla	2.800	4.506	US 64 east / US 84 east – Tres Piedras, Española, Taos, Santa Fe US 64 west / US 84 west – Chama	
Tierra Amarilla	3.300	5.311	NM 162 north – US 64 / US 84, Chama NM 162 south – US 64, US 84, Tres Piedras, Española, Taos, Santa Fe	Eastern terminus: T intersection
1.000 mi = 1.609 km; 1.000 km = 0.621 mi: Route transition

== See also ==
- List of state highways in New Mexico
