= New Mexico State Road 112 =

State highway in Rio Arriba County, New Mexico, United States

State Road 112

Route information
- Maintained by NMDOT
- Length: 44.755 mi (72.026 km)

Major junctions
- South end: NM 96 north of Regina
- NM 531 east-northeast of La Puente; NM 531 south of Los Ojos
- North end: US 64 / US 84 south of Los Ojos

Location
- Country: United States
- State: New Mexico
- Counties: Rio Arriba

Highway system
- New Mexico State Highway System; Interstate; US; State; Scenic
← NM 111	→ NM 113

State Road 112 (NM 112) is a 44.755-mile (72.026 km) state highway in Rio Arriba County, New Mexico, United States, that connects New Mexico State Road 96 (NM 96), north of Regina, with U.S. Route 64 / U.S. Route 84 (US 64 / US 84) on the northern edge of Tierra Amarilla.

== Route description ==
NM 112 begins at a T intersection with NM 96, roughly three miles (4.8 km) north of the census-designated place of Regina. (NM 96 heads east toward Gallina and US 84. Westbound NM 96 heads south toward Regina and U.S. Route 550.) From its southern terminus NM 112 heads north-northeasterly as a two-lane asphalt paved road for about 10.3 miles (16.6 km) before passing through the unincorporated community of Llaves.

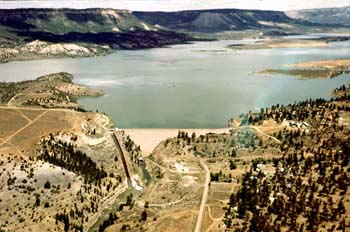
North at El Vado Dam and NM 112

North of Llaves NM 112 continues its north-northeasterly course within the Santa Fe National Forest, but after approximately 4.6 miles (7.4 km) it becomes a gravel road, and remains so for the next 16 miles (26 km). Just over 11 miles (18 km) north of Llaves NM 112 leaves the National Forest and enters the Jicarilla Apache Nation Reservation and assumes a more northeasterly course. Seven miles (11 km) later MN 112 leaves the Reservation near the southern end of El Vado Reservoir. About 1.3 miles (2.1 km) beyond NM 112 crosses over the El Vado Dam and enters the unincorporated community of El Vado. On the east side of the dam the gravel road ends and NM 112 continues as an asphalt paved road.

East of El Vado NM 112 proceeds very briefly southeast before continuing on a northeasterly course for 11 miles (18 km). After passing south of the unincorporated community of La Puente NM 112 crosses New Mexico State Road 153 (NM 153) at an intersection on the westernmost edge of the CDP of Terria Amarilla, immediately west of the Tierra Amarilla Elementary School. (NM 153 heads east to cross US 64 / US 84 end at New Mexico State Road 162 and heads west to El Puente.) About 1.7 miles (2.7 km) northeast of its junction with NM 153, at after running along the northwestern edge of the CDP, NM 112 reaches its northern terminus at a T intersection with US 64 / US 84 on the northernmost edge of Tierra Amarilla. (Eastbound US 64 / US 84 heads south toward Tres Piedras, Española, Taos, and Santa Fe. Westbound US 64 / US 84 heads north toward Chama.)

== Major intersections ==
The entire route is in Rio Arriba County.

Location	mi	km	Destinations	Notes
	0.000	0.000	NM 96 east – Gallina, US 84 NM 96 west – Regina, US 550	Southern terminus; T intersection
			El Vado Dam on the Rio Chama	
Tierra Amarilla	43.055	69.290	NM 531 east – US 64 / US 84, NM 162 NM 531 west – La Puente	
Tierra Amarilla	44.726	71.980	NM 514 north – Los Ojos	Southern end of NM 514; T intersection
Tierra Amarilla	44.755	72.026	US 64 east / US 84 east – Tres Piedras, Española, Taos, Santa Fe US 64 west / US 84 west – Chama	Northern terminus; T intersection
1.000 mi = 1.609 km; 1.000 km = 0.621 mi

== See also ==
- List of state highways in New Mexico
