= New Mexico State Road 162 =

State highway in Rio Arriba County, New Mexico, United States

State Road 162
- NM 162 highlighted in red

Route information
- Maintained by NMDOT
- Length: 2.600 mi (4.184 km)
- Existed: c. 1951–present

Major junctions
- South end: US 84 south of Tierra Amarilla
- US 64 in Tierra Amarilla; NM 531 in Tierra Amarilla; NM 573 in Tierra Amarilla
- North end: US 64 / US 84 in Tierra Amarilla

Location
- Country: United States
- State: New Mexico
- Counties: Rio Arriba

Highway system
- New Mexico State Highway System; Interstate; US; State; Scenic
← NM 161	→ NM 163

State Road 162 (NM 162) is a 2.600-mile (4.184 km) state highway in Rio Arriba County, New Mexico, United States, that connects U.S. Route 84 (US 84), south of Tierra Amarilla, with U.S. Route 64 / US 84 (US 64 / US 84 in Tierra Amarilla. NM 162 forms an eastern loop off of NM 84 and is an asphalt paved, two-lane road for its entire length.

== Route description ==
NM 162 begins at a T intersection with US 84 south of the census-designated place of Tierra Amarilla. (Westbound US 84 heads north to US 64, Tierra Amarilla, and Chama. Eastbound US 84 heads south toward Española and Santa Fe.) From its southern terminus NM 162 proceeds north-northeast for one-half mile (0.80 km) before crossing US 62 on the southern edge of Tierra Amarilla. (Westbound US 84 heads north to US 64, Tierra Amarilla, and Chama. Eastbound US 84 heads south toward Española and Santa Fe.)

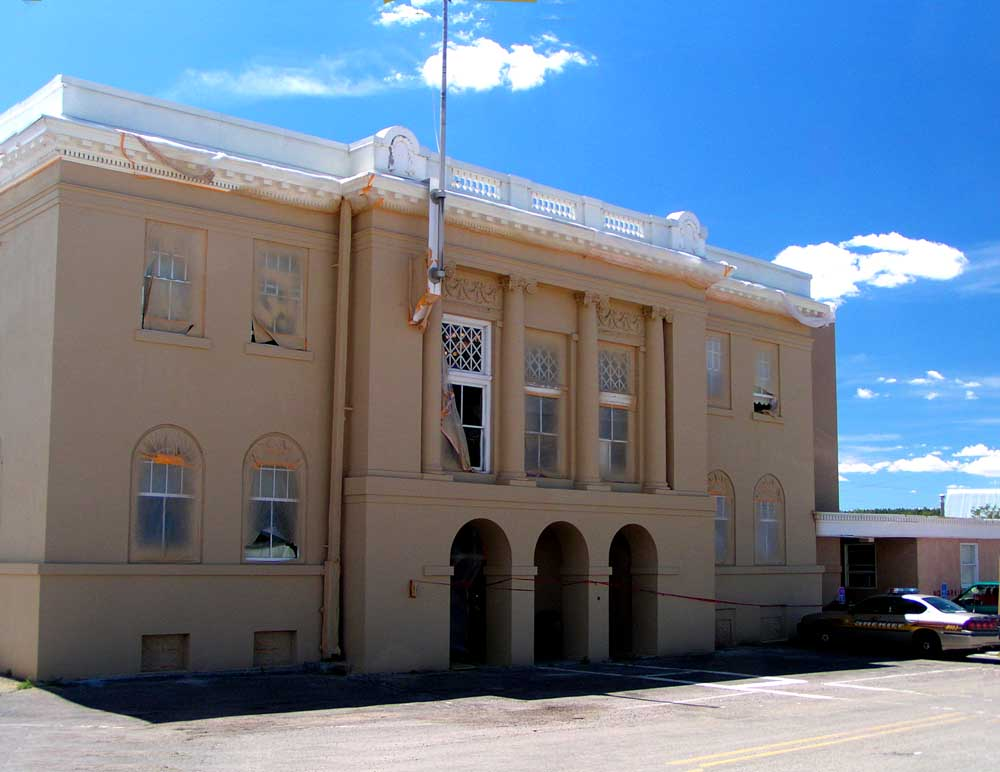
The Rio Arriba County Courthouse, located the junction of NM 531 and NM 162 within the Tierra Amarilla Historic District in downtown Tierra Amarilla

Entering Tierra Amarilla, NM 162 quickly enters the Tierra Amarilla and continues northerly for just under one mile (1.6 km) to reach a T-intersection with the east end of NM 153 on the northeast corner of the Rio Arriba County Courthouse in downtown Tierra Amarilla. At the intersection, NM 162 turns northeast to leave the downtown area and proceeds north.

One-half mile (0.80 km) later, after leaving the Tierra Amarilla Historic District, in the northern outskirts of the community, NM 162 reaches the southern end of NM 573 at another T-intersection. From that intersection, NM 162 turns to proceed northwest and continues through open land with a few houses for 0.7 miles (1.1 km) before reaching its northern terminus at US 64/US 84 in the northern part of Tierra Amarilla.

The New Mexico Department of Transportation (NMDOT) tracks the traffic levels on its highways. On NM 162 in 2017, they determined that on average the traffic was between 1 and 2,999 vehicles per day along the highway.

== History ==
NM 162 was established between 1948 and 1951. It travelled from US 84 north of Tierra Amarilla along modern NM 573 to NM 512 which it followed west to US 84 in Brazos. In 1951, the entire length was an improved gravel road. By 1956, the section from US 84 to Ensenada had been paved. Between 1956 and 1958, US 84 was moved onto a new alignment slightly west of Tierra Amarilla. US 64 originally followed modern NM 68 from Taos to Espanola, then US 84 from there to Santa Fe. On November 24, 1972, AASHTO approved plans to reroute US 64 from Taos through Tres Piedras, Tierra Amarilla, and Bloomfield to Farmington along former NM 111, NM 553 and NM 17. In the 1988 renumbering, NM 512 and NM 573 were created and NM 162's northern terminus was changed to its current location. The former segment of NM 162 Ensenada west to US 64 / US 84 became County Road 339A.

== Major intersections ==
The entire route is in Rio Arriba County.

Location	mi	km	Destinations	Notes
	0.000	0.000	US 84 east – Española, Santa Fe US 84 west – US 64, Tierra Amarilla, NM 162	Southern terminus; T intersection
Tierra Amarilla	0.500	0.805	US 64 east – Tres Piedras, Taos US 64 west – US 84, Tierra Amarilla, NM 162	
Tierra Amarilla	1.400	2.253	NM 531 west – US 64 / US 84, La Puente	Eastern end of NM 531
Tierra Amarilla	1.900	3.058	NM 573 north – Ensenada	Southern end of NM 573; former routing of NM 162
Tierra Amarilla	2.600	4.184	US 64 east / US 84 east – NM 162 US 64 west / US 84 west – Chama	Northern terminus; Y intersection
1.000 mi = 1.609 km; 1.000 km = 0.621 mi

== See also ==
- List of state highways in New Mexico
