= New Mexico State Road 514 =

State highway in Rio Arriba County, New Mexico

State Road 514

Route information
- Maintained by NMDOT
- Length: 1.5 mi (2.4 km)

Major junctions
- South end: NM 112 in Tierra Amarilla
- CR 340 in Los Ojos
- North end: US 64 / US 84 in Los Ojos

Location
- Country: United States
- State: New Mexico
- Counties: Rio Arriba

Highway system
- New Mexico State Highway System; Interstate; US; State; Scenic
← NM 513	→ NM 515

State Road 514 (NM 514) is a 1.5-mile (2.4 km) state highway in Los Ojos, New Mexico, United States, that connects New Mexico State Road 112 (NM 112) in Tierra Amarilla with U.S. Route 64 / U.S. Route 84 (US 64 / US 84) in Los Ojos.

== Route description ==
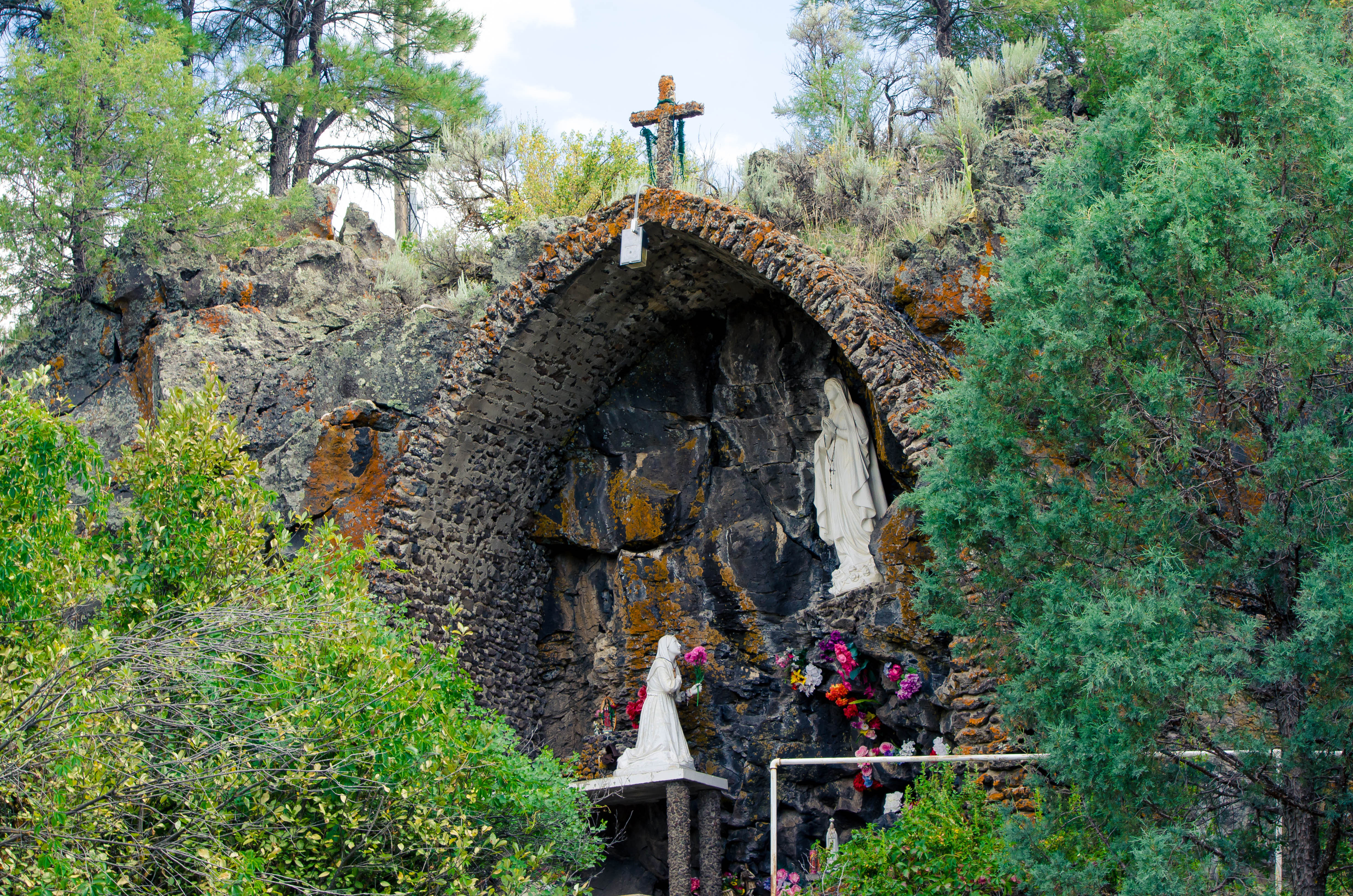
Our Lady of Lourdes Grotto, a site listed on the National Register of Historic Places, along NM 514, south of Los Ojos, August 2015

NM 514 begins at a T intersection with NM 112 on the northernmost edge of the census-designated place (CDP) of Tierra Amarilla, just west of US 64 / US 84. (NM 112 heads east to end at US 64/US 84 and west toward La Puente.) From its southern terminus NM 514 proceeds northerly for about 0.8 miles (1.3 km) to enter the CDP of Los Ojos as Main Street and reach the northern end of County Road 340 (CR 340) at a T intersection. (CR 340 heads southwesterly toward La Puente.)

Beyond the junction with CR 340, NM 514 continues northerly for approximately another 0.7 miles (1.1 km) to reach its northern terminus with US 64 / US 84, just south of that highway's junction with the east end of New Mexico State Road 95. (Eastbound US 64 / US 84 heads south toward Tres Piedras, Española, Taos, and Santa Fe. Westbound US 64 / US 84 heads north toward Chama.)

== Major intersections ==
The entire route is in Rio Arriba County.

Location	mi	km	Destinations	Notes
Tierra Amarilla	0.0	0.0	NM 112 north – US 64/US 84 NM 112 south – Regina	Southern terminus T intersection
Los Ojos	0.8	1.3	CR 340 south – La Puente	T intersection
Los Ojos	1.5	2.4	US 64 east / US 84 east – NM 112, Española, Santa Fe US 64 west / US 84 north – NM 96, Chama	Northern terminus: T intersection
1.000 mi = 1.609 km; 1.000 km = 0.621 mi

== See also ==
- List of state roads in New Mexico
