= County Road 340 (Rio Arriba County, New Mexico) =

County road in Rio Arriba County, New Mexico, United States

County Road 340

Route information
- Length: 2.8 mi (4.5 km)

Major junctions
- South end: NM 531 / NM 572 in La Puente
- North end: NM 514 in Los Ojos

Location
- Country: United States
- State: New Mexico
- County: Rio Arriba

Highway system
- New Mexico State Highway System; Interstate; US; State; Scenic

County Road 340 (CR 340) is a 2.8-mile (4.5 km) county road in Rio Arriba County, New Mexico, United States, that connects New Mexico State Road 531 (NM 531) and NM 572 in La Puente with NM 514 in Los Ojos.

== Route description ==
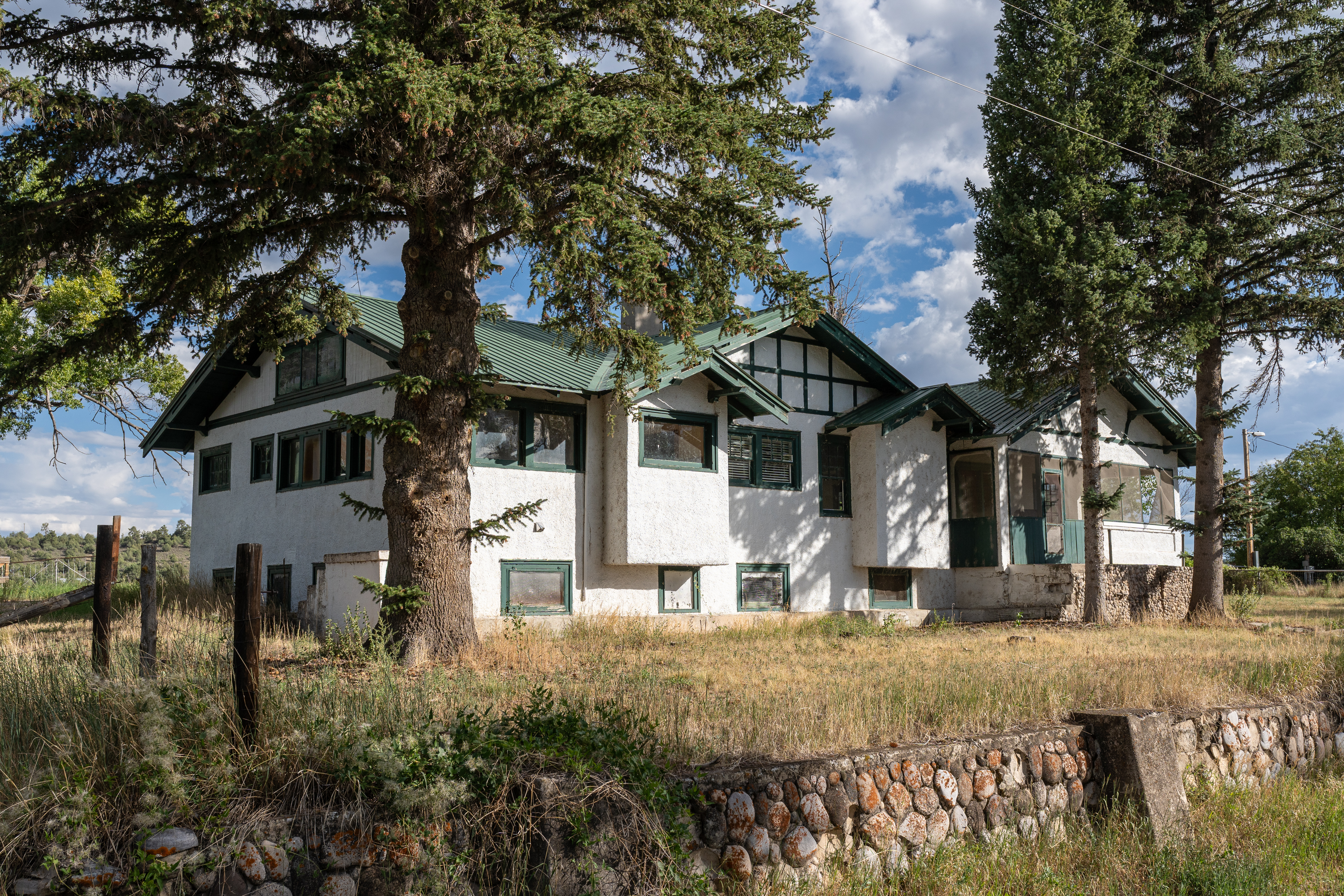
The George Becker House, one of several historic houses along La Puente Road (CR 340), south of Los Ojos, which are listed on the National Register of Historic Places, August 2025

CR 340 begins at a T-intersection with NM 531 and NM 572 in the unincorporated community of La Puente.

From its southern terminus CR 340 heads northeasterly as a two-lane asphalt paved road southeast of, but roughly parallel to, the Rio Chama. About 2.8 miles (4.5 km) from its southern terminus, CR 340 reaches its northern terminus at a T-intersection with NM 514 (Main Street) in Los Ojos.

== Major intersections ==
The entire route is in Rio Arriba County.

Location	mi	km	Destinations	Notes
La Puente	0.0	0.0	NM 572 north – Plaza Blanca NM 531 east – Tierra Amarilla	Western terminus; T-intersection; roadway continues eastward as NM 531
Los Ojos	2.8	4.5	NM 514 (Main Street) – Chama, Tierra Amarilla	Eastern terminus; T-intersection
1.000 mi = 1.609 km; 1.000 km = 0.621 mi
