= New Mexico State Road 572 =

State highway in Rio Arriba County, New Mexico, United States

State Road 572
- NM 572 highlighted in red

Route information
- Maintained by NMDOT
- Length: 1.100 mi (1.770 km)

Major junctions
- South end: NM 531 in La Puente
- North end: NM 95 in Plaza Blanca

Location
- Country: United States
- State: New Mexico
- Counties: Rio Arriba

Highway system
- New Mexico State Highway System; Interstate; US; State; Scenic
← NM 571	→ NM 573

State Road 572 (NM 572) is a 1.100-mile (1.770 km) state highway in Rio Arriba County, New Mexico, United States, that officially connects New Mexico State Road 531 (NM 531) and County Road 340 (CR 340) in La Puente with New Mexico State Road 95 (NM 95) in Plaza Blanca,

== Route description ==
NM 572 begins at a T intersection with NM 531 and CR 340, just east of the Rio Chama on the west side of the unincorporated community of La Puente. (CR 340 heads northeasterly, paralleling the Rio Chama, towards Los Ojos. NM 531 heads easterly towards Tierra Amarilla.) From its southern terminus NM 572 proceeds southwest as a dirt road down the east bank of the Rio Chama before turning northeasterly to ford the river and entering the unincorporated community of Plaza Blanca.

Roughly 1,300 feet (400 m) west of the river NM 572 reaches asphalt pavement and turns briefly west, before turning north. About 1,600 feet (490 m) later it turns northwest and quickly reaches its northern terminus at a T intersection with NM 95 on the western edge of Plaza Blanca. (NM 95 heads east towards Los Ojos and west towards the north end of El Vado Lake State Park.)

Following the extension of NM 95 west from Rutheron in 1969, the state has not maintained the river crossing (nor the adjacent sections of dirt road) along NM 572. Therefore, the ford of the Rio Chama is likely impassable.

== Major intersections ==
Mile markers increase from north to south.

The entire route is in Rio Arriba County.

Location	mi	km	Destinations	Notes
La Puente	0.000	0.000	CR 340 north – Los Ojos NM 531 east – Tierra Amarilla	Southern terminus; T intersection
Plaza Blanca–La Puente line			Ford of the Rio Chama	
Plaza Blanca	1.100	1.770	NM 95 east – Los Ojos NM 95 west – El Vado Lake State Park	Northern terminus; T intersection
1.000 mi = 1.609 km; 1.000 km = 0.621 mi

== See also ==
- List of state highways in New Mexico
