= New Mexico State Road 573 =

State highway in Rio Arriba County, New Mexico, United States

State Road 573
- NM 573 highlighted in red

Route information
- Maintained by NMDOT
- Length: 2.220 mi (3.573 km)
- Existed: 1988–present

Major junctions
- South end: NM 162 in Tierra Amarilla
- North end: CR 327 / CR 331 in Ensenada

Location
- Country: United States
- State: New Mexico
- Counties: Rio Arriba

Highway system
- New Mexico State Highway System; Interstate; US; State; Scenic
← NM 572	→ NM 574

State Road 573 (NM 573) is a 2.22-mile (3.57 km) state highway in Rio Arriba County, New Mexico, United States, that connects New Mexico State Road 162 (NM 162) in Tierra Amarilla with County Route 331 (CR 331) and County Road 327 (CR 327) in Ensenada.

== Route description ==
NM 573 begins at a T intersection in the northern part of the census-designated place (CDP) of Tierra Amarilla. (NM 162, which forms an eastern loop off of U.S. Route 84 [US 84], heads north toward U.S. Route 64 (US 64) / US 84 and south toward 64 and then US 84.) From its southern terminus NM 573 proceeds northeasterly at a two-lane asphalt paved road to quickly leave Tierra Amarilla.

NM 573 continues its north-northeasterly heading for about 1.2 miles (1.9 km) to enter the CDP of Ensenada. Just under one mile (1.6 km) farther north NM 573 reaches its northern terminus with CR 331 and CR 327 at a T intersection on the northern edge of Ensenada. (CR 331 heads northerly for just over one-half mile [0.80 km] to end at New Mexico State Road 512. CR 327 heads easterly for less than one mile [1.6 km] before ending at a private residence. County Road 339A, which forks off to the west from CR 331 immediately west of NM 573's northern terminus, is the pre-1988 routing of NM 162.)

== History ==
From the 1950s until 1988 the road that is now NM 573 was originally designated as NM 162. NM 573 was created in 1988 when NM 162's northern terminus was changed to its current location to (end a U.S. Route 64 / U.S. Route 84 in New Mexico) and the previous segment of NM 162 (from Tierra Amarilla to Ensenada) was designated as NM 573 and the segment from Ensenada west to US 64 / US 84 became County Road 339A.

== Major intersections ==
The entire route is in Rio Arriba County.

Location	mi	km	Destinations	Notes
Tierra Amarilla	0.000	0.000	NM 162 north – US 64 / US 84, Chama NM 162 south – US 64, US 84, Tres Piedras, Española, Taos, Santa Fe	Southern terminus; T intersection
Ensenada	2.220	3.573	CR 331 north – NM 512, Brazos CR 327 east	Northern terminus; T intersection; southern end of CR 331; western end of CR 327
1.000 mi = 1.609 km; 1.000 km = 0.621 mi

== See also ==
- List of state highways in New Mexico
