= U.S. Route 64 in New Mexico =

Highway in Arizona and New Mexico

U.S. Route 64
- US 64 highlighted in red

Route information
- Maintained by ADOT and NMDOT
- Length: 429.912 mi (691.876 km) 4.157 miles (6.690 km) in Arizona; 425.755 miles (685.186 km) in New Mexico
- Existed: November 11, 1926–present
- History: AZ: Designated December 2, 1988; NM: Designated November 11, 1926

Major junctions
- West end: US 160 in Teec Nos Pos, AZ
- US 491 in Shiprock, NM; US 550 in Bloomfield, NM; US 84 in Tierra Amarilla, NM; US 285 in Tres Piedras, NM; I-25 / US 85 / US 87 near Raton, NM; US 56 / US 87 / US 412 in Clayton, NM
- East end: US 56 / US 64 / US 412 at the Oklahoma state line near Clayton, NM

Location
- Country: United States
- States: Arizona, New Mexico
- Counties: AZ: Apache; NM: San Juan, Rio Arriba, Taos, Colfax, Union

Highway system
- United States Numbered Highway System; List; Special; Divided
- Arizona State Highway System; Interstate; US; State; Scenic Proposed; Former
- New Mexico State Highway System; Interstate; US; State; Scenic
← SR 63	AZ	→ SR 64
← NM 63	NM	→ NM 65

U.S. Route 64 (US 64) is a U.S. Numbered Highway that runs from the Four Corners area in Arizona to the east coast of North Carolina. In Arizona, the highway starts at U.S. Route 160 (US 160) and heads southeast for 4.5 miles (7.2 km) before entering New Mexico near the town of Beclabito. Through New Mexico, the highway passes through Shiprock, Bloomfield, Tierra Amarilla and Taos, sharing a short concurrency with I-25 near Raton, before heading east through Clayton to the Oklahoma state line.

== Route description ==
=== Arizona ===
U.S. Route 64 (US 64) starts at an intersection with US 160 at Teec Nos Pos on the Navajo Nation. The highway then heads southeast passing an intersection with Bureau of Indian Affairs Route 5028 (BIA 5028) at the edge of town across the highway from the Teec Nos Pos Trading Post. The highway then cuts through a mesa before making a slight curve south by southeast. Past the mesa, US 64 passes through sparse ranch land, intersecting BIA 5111 before turning slightly eastward. After passing an intersection with BIA 5113, US 64 crosses the New Mexico state line.

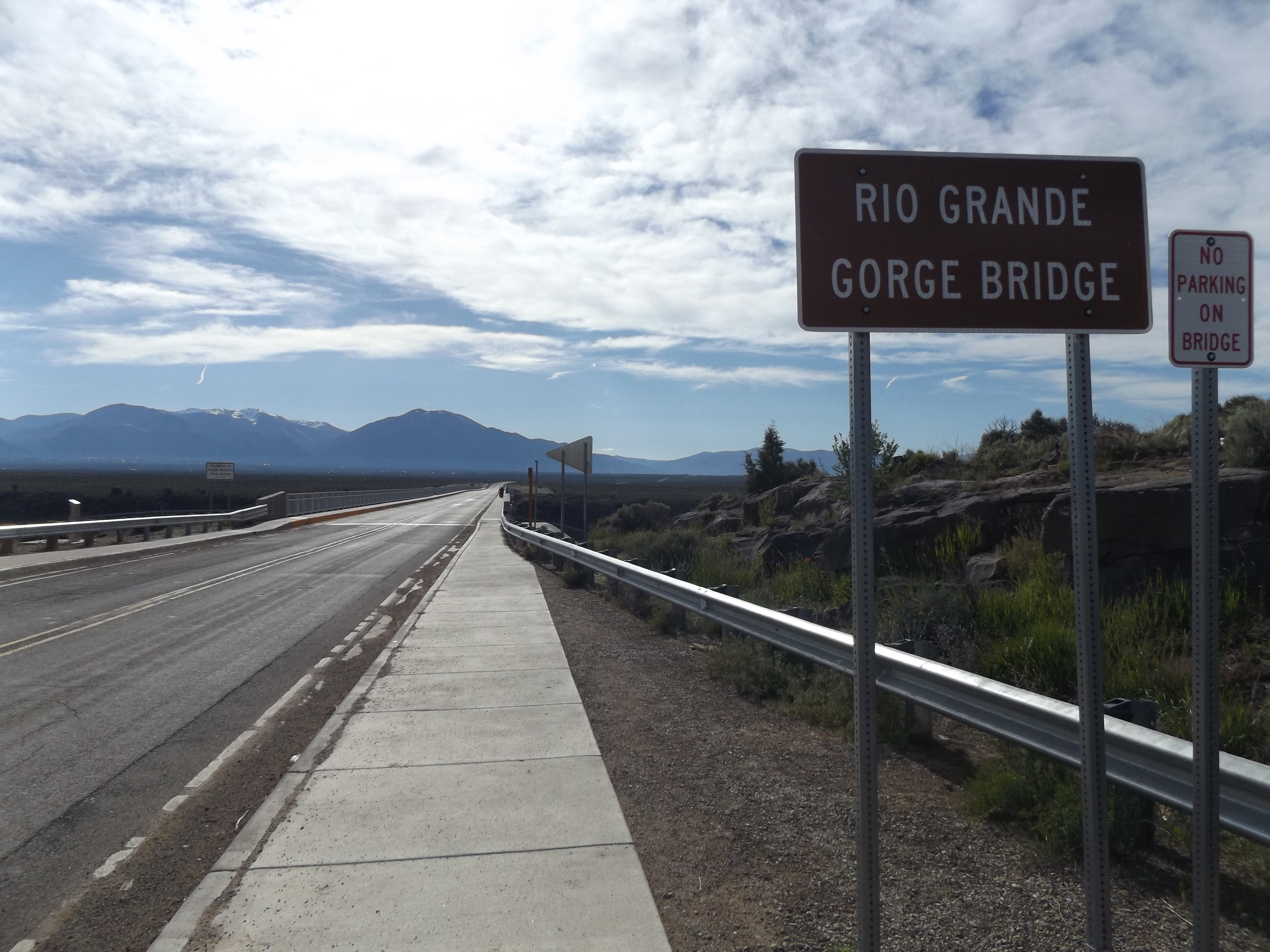
US 64 approaching the Rio Grande Gorge Bridge

=== New Mexico ===
Entering from Arizona, US 64 continues into the town of Beclabito, traveling to Shiprock. There US 64 makes a concurrency with US 491 for 0.5 miles (0.80 km). US 64 continues east into the city of Farmington, where it is multiplexed with unsigned State Road 5001 between junctions with US 64 Business. Then it passes through Bloomfield, followed by the towns of Blanco and Navajo City. After entering the Rocky Mountains, US 64 has a concurrency with US 84 from Chromo Mountain to Tierra Amarilla.

The highway then passes through Tres Piedras before crossing via the Rio Grande Gorge Bridge and heading into Taos. US 64 continues through the towns of Eagle Nest and Cimarron before eventually reaching I-25. The two highways bring up a short concurrency before US 64 turns northwest off of I-25 in Raton, then continuing to travel east, this time bringing up a concurrency with US 87 through the towns of Capulin, Des Moines, Grenville, and Mount Dora. The two highways split in Clayton, and US 64 forms another new concurrency with US 56 and US 412. The three highways barely touch the Texas Panhandle before continuing into Oklahoma.

== History ==
When originally designated on November 11, 1926, U.S. Route 64 (US 64) had its western terminus at US 385 in Capulin, New Mexico. In 1933, US 64 had been extended to end at US 85 in Santa Fe, New Mexico, replacing all of the previously designated US 485 between Raton and Santa Fe, through Taos. On November 11, 1972, US 64 was truncated from Santa Fe to Taos, then extended west through Tres Piedras, Brazos, Monero and Bloomfield to US 550 in Farmington. The new routing replaced all of New Mexico State Road 111 (NM 111) and NM 553 between Taos and Tierra Amarilla. US 64 now shared a concurrency with US 84 between Tierra Amarilla and a highway junction 4 miles (6.4 km) east of Monero. US 64 then replaced all of NM 17 between US 84 and US 550 in Farmington. On December 2, 1988, or sometime after that date, US 64 was further extended over Arizona State Route 504 and New Mexico State Road 504 to a junction with US 160 in Teec Nos Pos, Arizona near Four Corners. Today, the western terminus of US 64 remains at Teec Nos Pos.

== New Mexico State Road 5001 ==
State Road 5001
- Location: Farmington, New Mexico
- Length: 3.244 mi (5.221 km)

State Road 5001 (NM 5001) is an unsigned 3.244-mile-long (5.221 km) state highway. For its entire length, NM 5001 is multiplexed with US 64, and is also known as Murray Drive. NM 5001's western terminus is at US 64 Bus. (Main Street) in Farmington, and the eastern terminus is at US 64 Bus. (Broadway Avenue) in Farmington. NM 5001 is one of only three four-digit state highways in New Mexico (the others being NM 1113 and NM 6563).

== Future ==
Several plans involve safety improvements in US 64 at its intersection with NM 68.

== Junction list ==
State	County	Location	mi	km	Destinations	Notes
Arizona	Apache	Teec Nos Pos	465.400	748.989	US 160 – Kayenta, Cortez, Four Corners Monument	National western terminus; US 64 east to the New Mexico state line is former SR 504
			469.557 0.000	755.679 0.000	Arizona–New Mexico line	
New Mexico	San Juan	Shiprock	21.935	35.301	US 491 south – Gallup	Western end of US 491 concurrency; former US 666; US 64 west to the Arizona state line is former NM 504
New Mexico	San Juan	Shiprock	22.787	36.672	US 491 north – Cortez	Eastern end of US 491 concurrency; former US 666
New Mexico	San Juan	Farmington	48.371	77.846	NM 170 north – La Plata	
New Mexico	San Juan	Farmington	50.114	80.651	US 64 Bus. east (Main Street) – Farmington	Former US 550 north
New Mexico	San Juan	Farmington	50.114	80.651	Begin NM 5001	
New Mexico	San Juan	Farmington	51.472	82.836	NM 371 south (Bisti Highway) – Crownpoint	
New Mexico	San Juan	Farmington	52.400	84.330	End NM 5001	
New Mexico	San Juan	Farmington	52.400	84.330	US 64 Bus. west (Broadway Avenue) – Farmington	
New Mexico	San Juan	Farmington	53.842	86.650	NM 516 north (Browning Parkway) – Aztec, Durango	
New Mexico	San Juan	Bloomfield	63.862	102.776	US 550 south – Nageezi	Western end of US 550 concurrency
New Mexico	San Juan	Bloomfield	64.177	103.283	US 550 north – Aztec	Eastern end of US 550 concurrency
New Mexico	San Juan	Blanco	72.798	117.157	NM 575 north – Aztec	
New Mexico	San Juan		75.473	121.462	NM 511 north – Turley	
New Mexico	Rio Arriba	Navajo City	88.301	142.107	NM 539 north – Navajo Dam	
New Mexico	Rio Arriba		101.687	163.649	NM 527 west	
New Mexico	Rio Arriba		124.283	200.014	NM 537 south – Cuba, Albuquerque	
New Mexico	Rio Arriba		148.222	238.540	US 84 north – Pagosa Springs	Western end of US 84 concurrency
New Mexico	Rio Arriba	Chama	160.622	258.496	NM 17 north – Antonito, CO	
New Mexico	Rio Arriba	Brazos	169.477	272.747	NM 512	
New Mexico	Rio Arriba	Brazos–Los Ojos line	171.092	275.346	NM 95 west – Heron Lake State Park	
New Mexico	Rio Arriba	Los Ojos	171.171	275.473	NM 514	
New Mexico	Rio Arriba	Los Ojos	172.242	277.197	NM 112 – El Vado State Park	
New Mexico	Rio Arriba	Tierra Amarilla	172.894	278.246	NM 162 south	
New Mexico	Rio Arriba	Tierra Amarilla	173.634	279.437	NM 531 – La Puente	
New Mexico	Rio Arriba	Tierra Amarilla	174.560	280.927	US 84 south – Santa Fe	Eastern end of US 84 concurrency
New Mexico	Rio Arriba	Tierra Amarilla	174.740	281.217	NM 162	
New Mexico	Rio Arriba		215.950	347.538	NM 111 south – Vallecitos	
New Mexico	Taos	Tres Piedras	222.873	358.679	US 285 – Ojo Caliente, Antonito	
New Mexico	Taos		250.000	402.336	NM 150 north / NM 522 north – Taos Ski Valley, Arroyo Hondo	
New Mexico	Taos	Taos	254.025	408.814	NM 68 – Ranchos De Taos	
New Mexico	Taos	Taos	255.901	411.833	NM 585 west – Taos	
New Mexico	Colfax	Angel Fire	275.536	443.432	NM 434 south – Angel Fire, Angel Fire Airport	
New Mexico	Colfax	Eagle Nest	284.678	458.145	NM 127	
New Mexico	Colfax	Eagle Nest	285.270	459.098	NM 38 north – Red River	
New Mexico	Colfax	Cimarron	308.730	496.853	NM 21 south / Santa Fe Trail Scenic Byway – Philmont Scout Ranch	
New Mexico	Colfax	Cimarron	309.299	497.768	NM 58 east – Springer	
New Mexico	Colfax	Cimarron	313.020	503.757	NM 204 north	Access to areas in Philmont Scout Ranch
New Mexico	Colfax		320.652	516.039	NM 505 east – Maxwell	
New Mexico	Colfax		334.755	538.736	NM 445 south – Maxwell	
New Mexico	Colfax		343.875 448.010	553.413 721.002	I-25 south (US 85 south)	Western end of I-25/US 85 concurrency; I-25 exit 446; mileposts change to reflect I-25
New Mexico	Colfax	Raton	451.250 0.000	726.216 0.000	I-25 north (US 85 north) / I-25 BL begins / Santa Fe Trail Scenic Byway – Trinidad	Eastern end of I-25/US 85 concurrency; western end of I-25 Bus. concurrency; I-25 exit 450; mileposts change to reflect I-25 Bus.
New Mexico	Colfax	Raton	0.275	0.443	NM 555 west – New Mexico Department of Game and Fish, Rodeo Grounds, Miners' Colfax Medical Center	
New Mexico	Colfax	Raton	1.463 348.754	2.354 561.265	I-25 BL north (2nd Street north) – Trinidad, Historic District	Eastern end of I-25 Bus. concurrency; mileposts change to reflect US 64
New Mexico	Colfax	Raton	349.282	562.115	US 87 north / I-25 (US 85) – Springer, Trinidad	Western end of US 87 concurrency; I-25 exit 451
New Mexico	Colfax		361.054	581.060	NM 193	
New Mexico	Union	Capulin	376.663	606.180	NM 325 east – Folsom, Folsom Museum	Counterclockwise terminus of NM 325
New Mexico	Union	Des Moines	385.406	620.251	NM 325 north – Folsom, Folsom Museum	Clockwise terminus of NM 325
New Mexico	Union	Grenville	403.753	649.777	NM 453 / Santa Fe Trail Scenic Byway	
New Mexico	Union	Clayton	430.299	692.499	NM 370	
New Mexico	Union	Clayton	430.634 82.530	693.038 132.819	US 56 / US 412 west / US 87 south – Springer, Texline	Eastern end of US 87 concurrency; western end of US 56/US 412 concurrency; mileposts change to reflect US 56
New Mexico	Union	Clayton	83.250	133.978	NM 538 – Clayton Municipal Airport	
New Mexico	Union		85.890	138.227	NM 406 / Santa Fe Trail Scenic Byway – Seneca	
New Mexico	Union		94.172	151.555	US 56 east / US 64 east / US 412 east – Boise City	Continuation into Oklahoma
1.000 mi = 1.609 km; 1.000 km = 0.621 mi: Concurrency terminus

== Related route ==
=== Farmington business loop ===
U.S. Highway 64 Business
- Location: Farmington, New Mexico
- Length: 3.1 mi (5.0 km)

U.S. Route 64 Business (US 64 Bus.) goes through downtown Farmington, via Main Street and Broadway Avenue. Mainline US 64 is signed as both Bypass and Truck route, going south around Farmington, via Murray Drive.

U.S. Route 64
Previous state: Terminus	Arizona	Next state: New Mexico

U.S. Route 64
Previous state: Arizona	New Mexico	Next state: Oklahoma
