= Brazo (disambiguation) =

Brazo (Spanish, 'arm') is an American missile project.

Brazo or Brazos may also refer to:

== Rivers ==
- Brazos River, in Texas, U.S.
- Rio Brazos, a river in New Mexico, U.S.

== Places ==
- Brazos, Texas, U.S., in Palo Pinto County
- Brazos County, Texas, U.S.
- Brazos Mountains, in Rio Arriba County, New Mexico, U.S.

== Other uses ==
- Brazo, ring name variations of several members of the Alvarado wrestling family
- Brazos (band), American band of Martin McNulty Crane
- Battle of the Brazos, an athletic rivalry between Baylor University and Texas A&M University
- Brazos Press, an imprint of Baker Publishing Group
- Brazos, a generation of AMD APU

== See also ==
- Los Brazos Historic District in Los Ojos, New Mexico, U.S.
