= New Mexico State Road 512 =

State highway in Rio Arriba County, New Mexico, United States

State Road 512

Route information
- Maintained by NMDOT
- Length: 7.700 mi (12.392 km)

Major junctions
- West end: US 64 / US 84 in Brazos
- East end: End of state maintenance at Corkins Lodge

Location
- Country: United States
- State: New Mexico
- Counties: Rio Arriba

Highway system
- New Mexico State Highway System; Interstate; US; State; Scenic
← NM 511	→ NM 513

State Road 512 (NM 512) is a 7.700-mile (12.392 km) state highway in Rio Arriba County, New Mexico, United States, that connects U.S. Route 64 / U.S. Route 84 (US 64 / US 84) in Brazos with the end of state maintenance near Corkins Lodge.

== Route description ==
NM 512 begins at T intersection with US 64 / US 84 on the northmost edge of the census-designated place (CDP) of Brazos. (Eastbound US 64 / US 84 heads south toward Tierra Amarilla, Tres Piedras, Española, Taos, and Santa Fe. Westbound US 64 / US 84 heads north toward Chama.) From its western terminus, NM 512 proceeds southeast as a two-lane asphult paved road (briefly along the northeastern edge of Brazos) and quickly leaves the CDP.

About 1.8 miles (2.9 km) southeast of its western terminus NM 512 reaches its junction with the north end of County Route 331 (CR 331) at a T intersection. (CR 331 heads southerly for just over one-half mile [0.80 km] to end at the north end of New Mexico State Road 573 on the northernmost edge of Ensenda.) From its junction with CR 331, NM heads east (north of, but roughly paralleling, the Rio Brazos) for nearly 6 miles (9.7 km) until it reaches its eastern terminus at the Corkins Lodge resort.

== Major intersections ==
The entire route is in Rio Arriba County.

Location	mi	km	Destinations	Notes
Brazos	0.000	0.000	US 64 east / US 84 east – Tierra Amarilla, Tres Piedras, Española, Taos, Santa Fe US 64 west / US 84 west – Chama	Western terminus; T intersection
	1.800	2.897	CR 331 south – Ensenada, NM 573	T intersection; northern end of CR 331
	7.700	12.392	End of state maintenance at Corkins Lodge	Eastern terminus
1.000 mi = 1.609 km; 1.000 km = 0.621 mi

== See also ==
- List of state highways in New Mexico
