= Tierra Amarilla =

Tierra Amarilla may refer to:

- Tierra Amarilla Land Grant, a 600,000 acres (240,000 ha) Mexican land grant in New Mexico.
- Tierra Amarilla, Chile, a commune in Chile
- Tierra Amarilla, New Mexico, a census-designated place in New Mexico
- Tierra Amarilla Air Force Station, a closed United States Air Force station in New Mexico
- Tierra Amarilla Historic District, a listed historic district in Tierra Amarilla, New Mexico
