= New Mexico State Road 445 =

State highway in New Mexico, United States

State Road 445

Route information
- Maintained by NMDOT
- Length: 12.255 mi (19.723 km)

Major junctions
- Southern end: I-25 in Maxwell
- Northern end: US 64 near Maxwell

Location
- Country: United States
- State: New Mexico
- Counties: Colfax

Highway system
- New Mexico State Highway System; Interstate; US; State; Scenic
← NM 444	→ NM 446

State Road 445 (NM 445) is a 12 1/4-mile-long (19.7 km) state highway in the US state of New Mexico. NM 445's southern terminus is at Interstate 25 (I-25) in Maxwell, and the northern terminus is at U.S. Route 64 (US 64) north-northeast of Maxwell.

== Major intersections ==
The entire route is in Colfax County.

Location	mi	km	Destinations	Notes
Maxwell	0.000	0.000	I-25	Southern terminus
	1.000	1.609	NM 505 north	Southern terminus of NM 505
	12.255	19.723	US 64	Northern terminus
1.000 mi = 1.609 km; 1.000 km = 0.621 mi
