= New Mexico State Road 571 =

State highway in New Mexico, United States

State Road 571
- NM 571 highlighted in red

Route information
- Maintained by NMDOT
- Length: 2.0 mi (3.2 km)

Major junctions
- South end: NM 215 in Las Placitas
- North end: NM 554 in El Rito

Location
- Country: United States
- State: New Mexico
- Counties: Rio Arriba

Highway system
- New Mexico State Highway System; Interstate; US; State; Scenic
← NM 570	→ NM 572

State Road 571 (NM 571) is a 2-mile-long (3.2 km) state highway in the US state of New Mexico. NM 571's southern terminus is at NM 215 in Las Placitas, and the northern terminus is at NM 554 in El Rito.

== Major intersections ==
The entire route is in Rio Arriba County.

Location	mi	km	Destinations	Notes
El Rito	0.000	0.000	NM 554	Northern terminus
Las Placitas	2.000	3.219	NM 215	Southern terminus
1.000 mi = 1.609 km; 1.000 km = 0.621 mi
