= New Mexico State Road 215 =

State highway in New Mexico, United States

State Road 215

Route information
- Maintained by NMDOT
- Length: 3.047 mi (4.904 km)

Major junctions
- South end: CR 218 near Las Placitas
- North end: NM 554 near El Rito

Location
- Country: United States
- State: New Mexico
- Counties: Rio Arriba

Highway system
- New Mexico State Highway System; Interstate; US; State; Scenic
← NM 214	→ NM 216

State Road 215 (NM 215) is a 3.047-mile-long (4.904 km) state highway in the US state of New Mexico. NM 215's southern terminus is a continuation as County Route 218 (CR 218) southeast of Las Placitas, and the northern terminus is at NM 554 in El Rito.

== Major intersections ==
The entire route is in Rio Arriba County.

Location	mi	km	Destinations	Notes
El Rito	0.000	0.000	NM 554	Northern terminus
Las Placitas	2.174	3.499	NM 571 north	Southern terminus of NM 571
	3.047	4.904	CR 218	Southern terminus, continues south as CR 218
1.000 mi = 1.609 km; 1.000 km = 0.621 mi
