= New Mexico State Road 110 =

State highway in New Mexico, United States

State Road 110
- NM 110 highlighted in red

Route information
- Maintained by NMDOT
- Length: 3.798 mi (6.112 km)

Major junctions
- South end: NM 554 in El Rito
- North end: Forest Road 559 near El Rito

Location
- Country: United States
- State: New Mexico
- Counties: Rio Arriba

Highway system
- New Mexico State Highway System; Interstate; US; State; Scenic
← NM 109	→ NM 111

State Road 110 (NM 110) is a state highway in the US state of New Mexico. Its total length is approximately 3.8 miles (6.1 km). NM 110's southern terminus is at NM 554 in El Rito, and the northern terminus is at the end of state maintenance at Forest Road 559 north of El Rito.

== Major intersections ==
The entire route is in Rio Arriba County.

Location	mi	km	Destinations	Notes
El Rito	0.000	0.000	NM 554	Southern terminus
	3.798	6.112	Forest Road 559	Northern terminus
1.000 mi = 1.609 km; 1.000 km = 0.621 mi
