= New Mexico State Road 505 =

State highway in New Mexico, United States

State Road 505

Route information
- Maintained by NMDOT
- Length: 11.973 mi (19.269 km)

Major junctions
- South end: NM 445 near Maxwell
- North end: US 64 near Cimarron

Location
- Country: United States
- State: New Mexico
- Counties: Colfax

Highway system
- New Mexico State Highway System; Interstate; US; State; Scenic
← NM 503	→ NM 506

State Road 505 (NM 505) is a 12-mile-long (19 km) state highway in the US state of New Mexico. NM 505's southern terminus is at NM 445 north of Maxwell, and the northern terminus is at U.S. Route 64 (US 64) east-northeast of Cimarron.

== Major intersections ==
The entire route is in Colfax County.

Location	mi	km	Destinations	Notes
	0.000	0.000	NM 445	Southern terminus
	11.973	19.269	US 64	Northern terminus
1.000 mi = 1.609 km; 1.000 km = 0.621 mi
