= Tierra Amarilla Historic District =

Historic district in New Mexico, United States

- U.S. National Register of Historic Places
- NM State Register of Cultural Properties
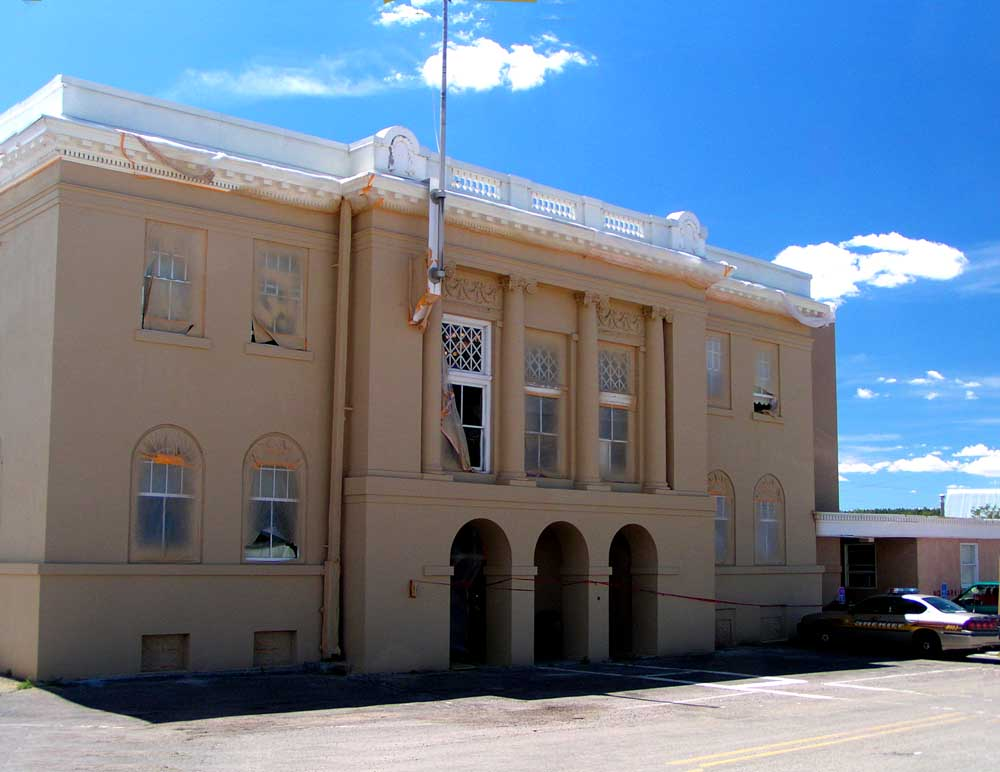
- The Rio Arriba County Courthouse, located at the junction of NM 531 and NM 162
- Location: Roughly along La Puente Road on both sides of US 64 / US 84 and along Old Highway (NM 162) and Creek Road (NM 531) in Tierra Amarilla, New Mexico
- Coordinates: 36°42′01″N 106°33′24″W
- Area: 81 acres (33 ha)
- Architectural style: New Mexico Vernacular
- MPS: La Tierra Amarilla MRA
- NRHP reference No.: 86002327

Significant dates
- Added to NRHP: September 29, 1986
- Designated NMSRCP: February 28, 1986

The Tierra Amarilla Historic District is an 81 acres (33 ha) historic district in the census-designated place of Tierra Amerilla, New Mexico, United States, that is listed on the National Register of Historic Places (NRHP).

== Description ==
The district is located mostly along roads that are now designated as New Mexico State Road 531 and New Mexico State Road 162 and includes 107 contributing buildings It was listed on the NRHP September 29, 1986.

== See also ==
- National Register of Historic Places listings in Rio Arriba County, New Mexico
