= María Dolores Gonzales (author) =

Bilingual education advocate and educator (1946-)

- Born: 1946 (age 79–80); Roy, New Mexico
- Occupations: Bilingual education advocate and educator

María Dolores Gonzales (born 1946) is a Mexican-American author and educator, and advocate for bilingual education in the US. She is a scholar in the realm of bilingual studies and linguistic history of the American Southwest. She taught at University of New Mexico for 12 years as a professor and was head of the Sabine Ulibarrí Spanish Heritage Program, and after retiring established the Spanish immersion program, Bilingual Strategies. Her programs advocate for the revitalization of New Mexican Spanish and dialectical awareness to connect Spanish speakers with their heritage, in order to reverse the damage of Spanish and US colonialism.

== Early life and education ==
Gonzales was born to Canuto and Carlotta Gonzales, Jr. Her father worked with the Bureau of Animal Industry in Mexico. Her family migrated from Zacatecas, Mexico in the mid-16th century.

In 1945, Gonzales' family moved from Bueyeros, New Mexico to Roy, New Mexico after a rainstorm destroyed their family farm and ranch. Gonzales was born one year later in 1946. She is one of five children: Consuelo Trujillo, Erlinda Gonzales-Berry, Cecilia Gonzales de Tucker, and Gloria Gonzales. Her father worked as a liaison for the US government to educate farmers about foot and mouth disease, and left the family to work in Mexican villages.

Gonzales exclusively spoke Spanish until she was six years old. Their small town was racially divided with Anglos on one side of the street and Hispanics on the other. This contributed to the environment where Gonzales did not feel safe using her first language. Gonzales received punishment for speaking Spanish in her classes. She felt embarrassed and humiliated, and dropped out of the University of New Mexico for 10 years. These experiences cemented her career trajectory to help New Mexican Spanish-speakers in the American Southwest.

Their family moved to Guadalajara in 1949 for one year while her father worked for the US government.

She returned to New Mexico in 1950, and lived in Roy then Rosebud in Llano Estacado. Her mother was a school teacher in the early 1950s.

Their family moved again in 1958 to Albuquerque.

== Career ==
Gonzales graduated from Adams State College in Alamosa, Colorado with a bachelor's degree in Spanish and Chicano Studies. She attended University of New Mexico for her master's degree in Spanish and Latin American Literature, and her doctorate degree in Spanish sociolinguistics. She taught at UNM as well as in Las Cruces and Corpus Christi, Texas.

She revived and coordinated the Sabine Ulibarrí Spanish Heritage Program at UNM starting in 1999. When she began the program, it was limited to four sections and four teaching assistants. By the time she retired, the program had grown to include 23 sections, 11 graduate students, and an assistant director.

She retired from UNM and created the Bilingual Strategies Language Institute. This program offers Spanish immersion in New Mexico and Spanish conversation classes in Albuquerque. The program is intended for adult learners who cannot enroll in university classes using immersion techniques.

Gonzales began a writing group in 2016, Nuestras Voces Chicanas, which brings together bilingual women from northern New Mexico and southern Colorado to share their stories, as they have been historically marginalized by traditional publishing companies.

== Personal life ==
She is married with two children. She moved to Taos in 2015. She also participated in the National Hispanic Culture Center in Albuquerque, by portraying the character of Ultima from Rudolfo Anaya's novel Bless Me, Ultima. She led visitors on a tour of the Center while in character.

== Selected published works ==
- Gonzales, M. D. 1992. The role of women in linguistic tradition and innovation in a chicano community in New Mexico. Albuquerque, NM: University of New Mexico dissertation.
- Gonzales, M. D., & Galindo, D. L. (1999). Speaking Chicana : voice, power, and identity. University of Arizona Press.
- Gonzales, M. D. (2005). Todavia decimos' nosotros [los] mexicanos': construction of identity labels among nuevo mexicanos. Southwest Journal of Linguistics, 24(1-2), 65-78.
- Gonzales, M. D. (2020). Atop the Windmill: I Could See Forever. Lithexcel.
- Gonzales, M. D. (2021). "Chicana voices, las rucas rebeldes: a tribute to D. Letticia Galindo (1952-1998)." Gender and Language, 15(3), 1–. https://doi.org/10.1558/genl.20886
