= George Becker House, Bunk House and Barn =

Historic house in Rio Arriba County, New Mexico, United States

- U.S. National Register of Historic Places
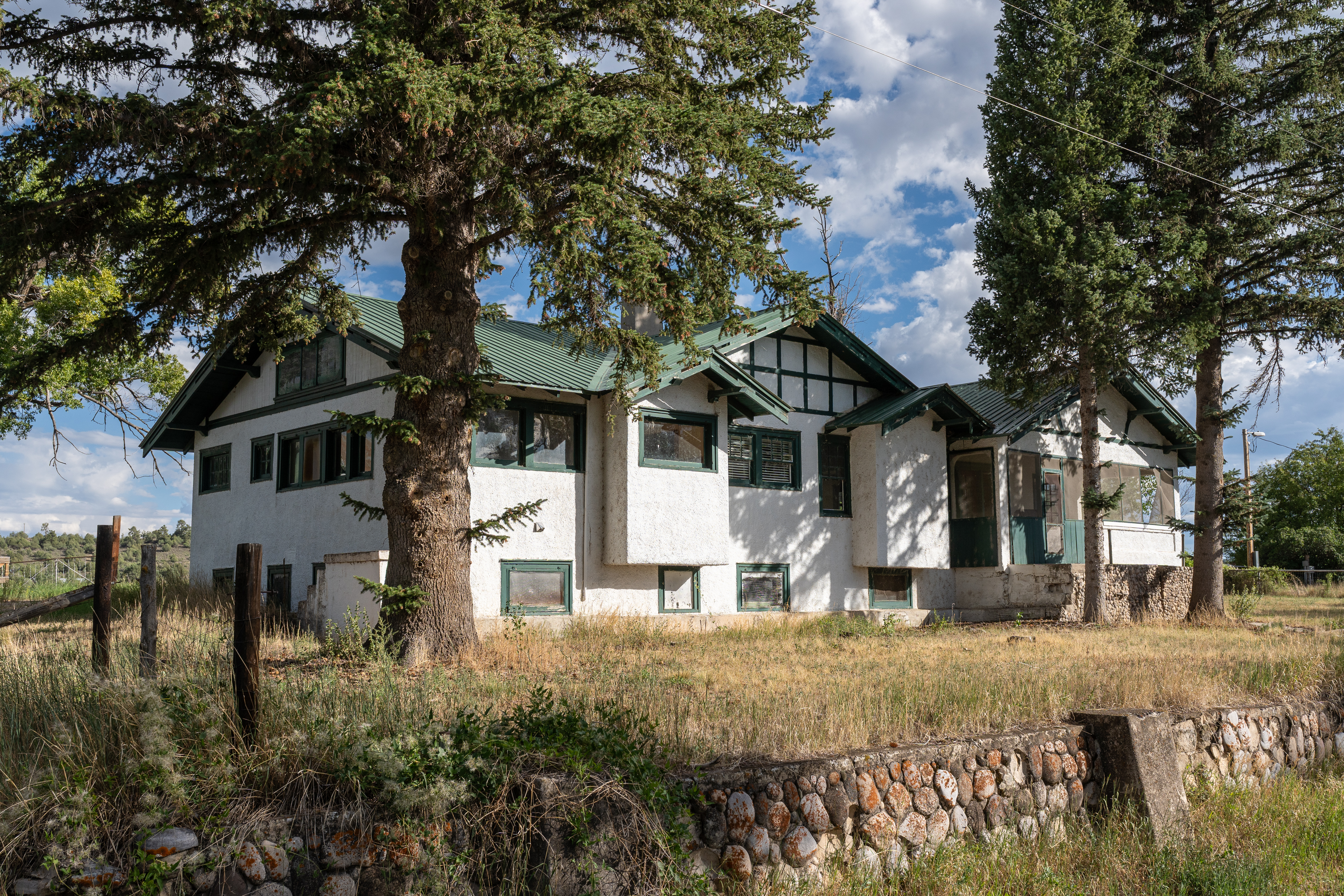
- George Becker House, August 2025
- Nearest city: Los Ojos, New Mexico
- Coordinates: 36°43′13″N 106°34′48″W
- Area: less than one acre
- Built: 1918
- Architectural style: Bungalow/craftsman
- MPS: La Tierra Amarilla MRA
- NRHP reference No.: 85000777
- Added to NRHP: April 4, 1985

The George Becker House, Bunk House and Barn, is a historic property southwest of Los Ojos, New Mexico, United States, was built in 1918–19. It was listed on the National Register of Historic Places in 1985.

== Description ==
The house and historic outbuildings are located along the east side of La Puente Road (County Road 340), south of Hatchery Road, among fields and other buildings, just above the drop-off from the first plateau to the river.

The house is stucco over wood frame, with half-timbering in its gable ends. About 70 feet (21 m) southeast of the house is horizontal log barn, about 18 by 60 feet (5.5 m × 18.3 m) in plan, with crude double box notching. A bunk house duplex is about 50 feet (15 m) south of the house.

== See also ==
- National Register of Historic Places listings in Rio Arriba County, New Mexico
