= Plaza Blanca, New Mexico =

Unincorporated community in Rio Arriba County, New Mexico, United States

- Unincorporated community
- Location within New Mexico
- Coordinates: 36°42′14″N 106°36′30″W
- Country: United States
- State: New Mexico
- County: Rio Arriba
- Elevation: 7,199 ft (2,194 m)
- Time zone: UTC-7 (Mountain (MST))
  - Summer (DST): UTC-6 (MDT)
- ZIP Code: 87551
- Area code: 575
- GNIS feature ID: 899852

Plaza Blanca is an unincorporated community along the Rio Chama in Rio Arriba County, New Mexico, United States. It is roughly 558 miles (898 km) north-northwest of Española and about 20 miles (32 km) south of the Colorado-New Mexico border. The majority of the community is part of the Plaza Blanca Historic District.

== Description ==
The community is located just south of New Mexico State Road 95 (NM 95), which connects the north ends of El Vado Lake and El Vado Lake State Park with U.S. Route 64 / U.S. Route 84 in Los Ojos. The west end of New Mexico State Road 572 (NM 572) connects with NM 95 on the west side of the community. Officially, NM 572 continues east to ford the Rio Chama and end at the west end of New Mexico State Road 153 (NM 153) in the unincorporated community of La Puente. However, the state has not maintained the river crossing (which is part of the Plaza Blanca Historic District) since 1969, following the construction of NM 95.
