= Sabine Ulibarrí =

American writer (1919–2003)

- Born: Sabine Reyes Ulibarrí; September 21, 1919; Tierra Amarilla, New Mexico, U.S.
- Died: January 4, 2003 (aged 83)
- Occupations: Poet; teacher; writer
- Writing career
- Language: Spanish

Sabine Reyes Ulibarrí (September 21, 1919 – January 4, 2003) was an American poet. He was also a teacher, a writer, a critic, and a statesman. Ulibarrí was born in Tierra Amarilla, New Mexico.

Rubén Cobos and Ulibarrí were the first two Latino Americans to be professors at the University of New Mexico. Some argue that Sabine Ulibarri—alongside Rudolfo Anaya – was one of the great thinkers of modern Hispanic literature who was grounded in what would be termed the 'old ways.'

== Early life and education ==
Sabine Ulibarrí served in World War II with the U.S. Army Air Forces. He was decorated for his valor during the war with two medals, the Distinguished Flying Cross and the Air Medal.

After the war he continued his studies at the University of New Mexico where he received his Master's in Spanish. After teaching for a few years at UNM he enrolled in the University of California, Los Angeles where he worked on his doctorate in Spanish literature. After receiving his doctorate in 1958 from UCLA he returned to the University of New Mexico and taught Spanish and Spanish-American literature until he retired in 1982.

== Career ==
Sabine Ulibarri is known widely for his use of language when crafting his stories, and the use of details of rural New Mexican Spanish and Native American life. His stories are considered some of the earliest roots in modern Hispano Literature taking shape both in Spanish and English. His books, Mi Abuela Fumaba Puros (My Grandmother Smoked Cigars)' and 'Mi Caballo Mago (My Wonder Horse)' and 'Tierra Amarilla: and other stories' are considered by many native New Mexican writers as quintessential examples of modern Hispanic literature and have inspired countless young Hispanics to become writers and educators.

Ulibarrí was able to recollect for younger Hispanos of New Mexico a sense of place and enlighten them with stories of the difficulties of living in Tierra Amarilla, a town which became famous during the Tierra Amarilla Court House raid. It is not known if any of Ulibarri's family or friends were involved in such contentious moments in New Mexican history. Sabine Ulibarri could be credited with highlighting the struggle of traditional values versus modern American law and policies such as 'manifest destiny' and how these concepts began eroding more than 500 years of agricultural and spiritual-based traditional lifestyles of northern New Mexico. He framed the conflict eloquently in his prose without ever digressing into political dissertation.

The University of New Mexico named the Sabine Ulibarrí Spanish as a Heritage Language (SUSHL) Program for him. María Dolores Gonzales, a colleague of Ulibarrí's in the Spanish department at UNM, ran the program for 12 years and expanded it.

== Bibliography ==
Maura, Juan Francisco. "Gaspar Pérez de Villagrá y Sabine Ulibarri: Pasado y presente de la épica de Nuevo México". Espéculo. Revista de estudios literarios. 20 (2002): 1–10. Universidad Complutense de Madrid.
