= Nicholas Herrera =

- Born: July 11, 1964 (age 62); El Rito, New Mexico, U.S.
- Known for: Santero art; bultos; retablos

Nicholas Herrera (born July 11, 1964) is an artist in the Northern New Mexico santero tradition, also known as El Rito Santero ("the Saint maker of El Rito").

== Life and career ==
He was born in El Rito, New Mexico, and his New Mexican roots helped to shape him as an artist who "follows the ever-expanding folk tradition of the Northern New Mexico santero." His art is known to provoke strong emotions, as it is satirical, religious and sometimes sad. Herrera's work takes the form of statuettes, sculptures inspired by modern issues, lithographs and plaster images. Much of his inspiration comes from a serious accident that put Herrera into a coma, during which he claims he saw a figure of death. As a result, his spiritual iconic style was born.

His work is in the permanent collections of the Smithsonian American Art Museum, Autry Museum of the American West, the Museum of International Folk Art, the Flatwater Folk Art Museum and the Sheldon Memorial Art Gallery. He is represented by EVOKE Contemporary in Santa Fe, New Mexico. His first solo museum exhibition, Nicholas Herrera: El Rito Santero, was held at the Harwood Museum of Art in Taos in 2024–2025 and was profiled in The New York Times.
