= New Mexico State Road 554 =

State highway in New Mexico, United States

State Road 554
- NM 554 highlighted in red

Route information
- Maintained by NMDOT
- Length: 21.153 mi (34.042 km)

Major junctions
- West end: US 84 East of Abiquiú
- NM 215 in El Rito
- East end: NM 111 Northwest of Ojo Caliente

Location
- Country: United States
- State: New Mexico
- Counties: Rio Arriba

Highway system
- New Mexico State Highway System; Interstate; US; State; Scenic
← NM 552	→ NM 555

New Mexico State Road 554 (NM 554) is a 21.153 mi (34.0 km) long state highway in northern New Mexico, located in the Southwestern United States. NM 554 is located on the southern slope of the Tusas Mountains. The highway starts east of Abiquiú at an intersection with U.S. Route 84, crossing the Rio Chama, then paralleling El Rito creek, passing through the village of El Rito, and ending Northwest of Ojo Caliente at an intersection with NM 111.

== Major intersections ==
The entire route is in Rio Arriba County.

Location	mi	km	Destinations	Notes
	0.000	0.000	US 84	Western terminus
El Rito	11.100	17.864	NM 571 south	Northern terminus of NM 571
El Rito	12.100	19.473	NM 110 north	Southern terminus of NM 110
El Rito	12.200	19.634	NM 215 south	Northern terminus of NM 215
	21.153	34.042	NM 111	Eastern terminus
1.000 mi = 1.609 km; 1.000 km = 0.621 mi
