= New Mexico State Road 95 =

State highway in Rio Arriba County, New Mexico, United States

State Road 95
- NM 95 highlighted in red

Route information
- Maintained by NMDOT
- Length: 13.415 mi (21.589 km)

Major junctions
- West end: CR 322 at El Vado Lake State Park
- NM 572 in Plaza Blanca
- East end: US 64 / US 84 in Los Ojos

Location
- Country: United States
- State: New Mexico
- Counties: Rio Arriba

Highway system
- New Mexico State Highway System; Interstate; US; State; Scenic
← NM 94	→ NM 96

State Road 95 (NM 95) is a 13.415-mile (21.589 km) state highway in Rio Arriba County, New Mexico, United States, that connects County Road 322 (CR 322) at the El Vado Lake State Park with U.S. Route 64 / U.S. Route 84 (US 64 / US 84) in Los Ojos.

== Route description ==
NM 95 begins at the west end of CR 322 at the north ends of the El Vado Reservoir and the El Vado Lake State Park. (CR 322 heads westerly toward the Jicarilla Apache Indian Reservation and Dulce. CR 322 initially follows the former routing of NM 95, which proceeded westerly, then southerly [via Lindrith] to end at New Mexico State Road 96 [NM 96] in Regina.)

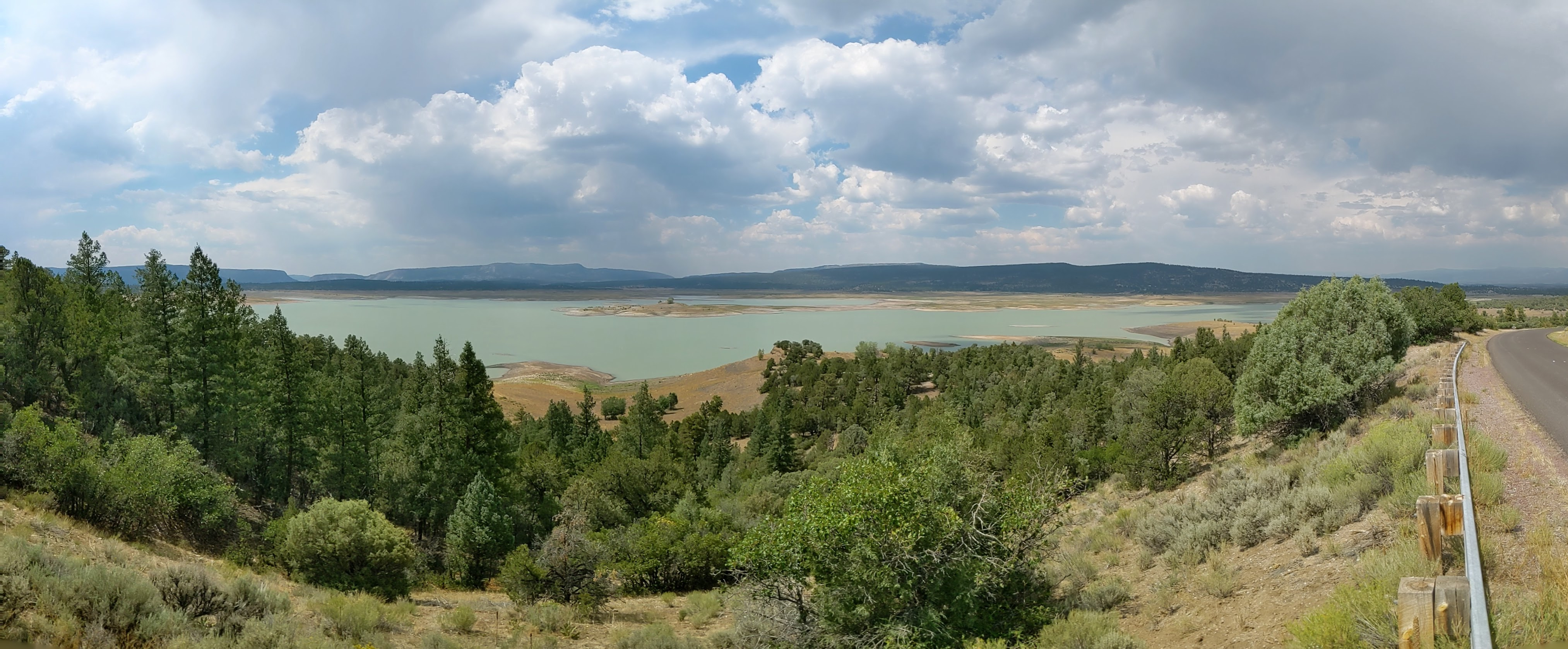
Northeast across Heron Lake from NM 95, August 2025

From its western terminus NM 95 proceeds northeasterly toward Heron Lake. After passing through Heron Lake State Park, including crossing Willow Creek on the Heron Dam, NM 95 continues northeasterly until it reaches its junction with the west end of New Mexico State Road 572 (NM 572) on the western edge of the unincorporated community of Plaza Blanca. (NM 572 officially heads west to ford the Rio Chama before ending at the west end of New Mexico State Road 153 in the unincorporated community of La Puente. However, after NM 95 was extended west from Rutheron in 1969, the state has not maintained the river crossing [nor the adjacent sections of dirt road] along NM 572. Therefore, the ford of the Rio Chama is likely impassable.)

In Plaza Blanca, NM 95 briefly turns north to pass through the unincorporated community of Rutheron before curving to head briefly east and then resuming a northeasterly course again. NN 95 then turns east again and, immediately after entering the census-designated place of Los Ojos, crosses over the Rio Chama and quickly reaches its eastern terminus at US 64 / US 84 at a T intersection. (Eastbound US 64 / US 84 heads south toward Tres Piedras, Española, Taos, and Santa Fe. Westbound US 64 / US 84 heads north toward Chama.)

== History ==
Originally, NM 95 only connected Rutheron with US 84 north of the unincorporated community of Park View (now Los Ojos). Eventually, it was extended to Plaza Blanca and on to loop around the north end of El Vado Reservoir, then south through the unincorporated community of Lindrith before ending at NM 96 in what is now the census-designated place of Regina in Sandoval County. However, NM 95 was eventually truncated back to its current route.

== Major intersections ==
Mile markers increase from east to west.

The entire route is in Rio Arriba County.

Location	mi	km	Destinations	Notes
	0.000	0.000	CR 322 west – Dulce	Western terminus; transitions to CR 322 former routing of NM 95
			Heron Dam on Willow Creek	
Plaza Blanca	9.551	15.371	NM 572 south – La Puente	Northern end of NM 572; T intersection
Los Ojos			Bridge over the Rio Chama	
Los Ojos	13.415	21.589	US 64 east / US 84 east – Tres Piedras, Española, Taos, Santa Fe US 64 west / US 84 west – Chama	Eastern terminus; T intersection
1.000 mi = 1.609 km; 1.000 km = 0.621 mi: Route transition

== See also ==
- List of state highways in New Mexico
