= New Mexico State Road 519 =

State highway in New Mexico, United States

State Road 519

Route information
- Maintained by NMDOT
- Length: 15.007 mi (24.151 km)

Major junctions
- South end: NM 111 near La Madera
- North end: CR 222 in Las Tablas

Location
- Country: United States
- State: New Mexico
- Counties: Rio Arriba

Highway system
- New Mexico State Highway System; Interstate; US; State; Scenic
← NM 518	→ NM 522

State Road 519 (NM 519) is a 15-mile-long (24 km) state highway in the US state of New Mexico. NM 519's southern terminus is at NM 111 south of La Madera, and the northern terminus is at the end of state maintenance and continues as County Route 222 in Las Tablas.

== Major intersections ==
The entire route is in Rio Arriba County.

Location	mi	km	Destinations	Notes
	0.000	0.000	NM 111	Southern terminus
	15.007	24.151	CR 222	Northern terminus
1.000 mi = 1.609 km; 1.000 km = 0.621 mi
