= Plaza Blanca Historic District =

Historic district in Rio Arriba County, New Mexico, United States

- U.S. National Register of Historic Places
- Location within New Mexico
- Location: Roughly Plaza Blanca and Old Puente Ford Rds. adjacent to Plaza Blanca Ditch, Plaza Blanca, New Mexico
- Coordinates: 36°42′15″N 106°36′32″W
- Area: 19 acres (7.7 ha)
- Built: 1880
- Architectural style: New Mexico Vernacular
- MPS: La Tierra Amarilla MRA
- NRHP reference No.: 86002322
- Added to NRHP: September 29, 1986

The Plaza Blanca Historic District, in Plaza Blanca, New Mexico, United States, is a 19 acres (7.7 ha) historic district which was listed on the National Register of Historic Places in 1986. The listing included 17 contributing buildings.

== Description ==
The district includes 12 houses and six of their outbuildings, and includes, roughly Plaza Blanca and Old Puente Ford Roads adjacent to Plaza Blanca Ditch. It also includes a church or capilla which is a converted school.

== See also ==
- National Register of Historic Places listings in Rio Arriba County, New Mexico
