= Rio Brazos =

- Location of the mouth of Rio Brazos in New Mexico

Location
- Country: United States
- State: New Mexico

Physical characteristics
- Source: Confluence of East and West Forks
  - location: Brazos Meadows, San Juan Mountains
  - coordinates: 36°52′30″N 106°22′29″W
  - elevation: 9,957 ft (3,035 m)
- Mouth: Rio Chama
  - location: Near Tierra Amarilla
  - coordinates: 36°52′30″N 106°22′29″W
  - elevation: 7,287 ft (2,221 m)
- Length: 42 mi (68 km)
- Basin size: 150 sq mi (390 km^{2})

Basin features
- Tributaries
  - left: Gavilan Creek, Encinado Creek
  - right: Barrow Canyon, Chavez Creek

The Rio Brazos is a 42-mile (68 km) long river flowing through northern New Mexico in the United States. It rises in the Tusas Mountains, a subrange of the San Juan Mountains, and runs generally southwest to a confluence with the Rio Chama, part of the larger Rio Grande system.

The river is formed by two streams, the 8.74-mile (14.07 km) West Fork and the 8.44-mile (13.58 km) East Fork, which converge at Brazos Meadows, just outside the western boundary of the Carson National Forest. For its first few miles, it flows south as a slow-moving, meandering mountain stream. East of Brazos Peak, it swings abruptly west into the Brazos Box, one of the largest canyons in New Mexico with a maximum depth of more than 1,400 feet (430 m). Here, it passes the Brazos Cliffs, receives Gavilan and Encinado Creeks, and picks up an unnamed tributary which feeds Brazos Falls, reputedly New Mexico's highest waterfall with a total drop of 2,400 feet (730 m). Northeast of Tierra Amarilla, the river emerges from the mountains, receiving Chavez Creek from the right. It passes the settlements of Ensenada, Brazos and Los Ojos before flowing into the Rio Chama about 90 miles (140 km) northwest of Santa Fe.

The Brazos is a perennial stream, reaching its highest flows in April and early May from snowmelt in the mountains, and is subject to occasional flash floods caused by summer monsoon thunderstorms. Although most of the river's length provides good fishing for brown and rainbow trout, especially the upper section which is one of the largest high-meadow streams in New Mexico, most of the drainage is private property. However, the New Mexico Constitution guarantees public access to all waterways in the state including the Rio Brazos as long as individuals remain within the river's banks.

Although most of the Brazos flows through wild lands, the river is heavily used for irrigation in the last 5 miles (8.0 km), with multiple acequias (irrigation ditches) drawing off water. As a result, this section of the river often shrinks to a trickle during the dry season. The U.S. Environmental Protection Agency lists the water quality for the last 3.52 miles (5.66 km) of the river as "impaired", owing mainly to agricultural runoff and heavy summer water diversions.

== See also ==
- List of rivers of New Mexico
- List of tributaries of the Rio Grande
