= Brazos Mountains =

Mountain range in New Mexico

Coordinates: 36°49′53″N 106°24′27″W

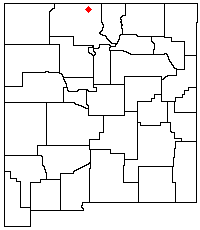
Location of the Brazos Mountains within New Mexico

The Brazos Mountains is a range in far northern Rio Arriba County, in northern New Mexico in the southwestern United States. The range is part of the Tusas Mountains (the southern portion of the San Juan Mountains), which extended slightly into Colorado. A high crest runs from the border with Colorado for over 20 miles (32 km) in a south-southeasterly direction. The high point of the range at 11,405 feet (3,476 m) is on Grouse Mesa, at the Brazos Benchmark. Two miles (3 km) to the southeast is the more distinctive Brazos Peak, at 11,288 feet (3440 m).

The range is mostly located in the privately held Tierra Amarilla Land Grant (the Carson National Forest is to the east and south). It is a distinctive part of the view from the west, including from Heron Lake. U.S. Route 64 crosses the southern end of the range at a 10,481 foot (3194 m) pass. This is the highest paved through road pass in New Mexico. Nearby are the photogenic Brazos Cliffs, headwaters of the Rio Brazos and part of the Rio Chama river system. These mountains overlook the Chama River, the largest tributary of the Rio Grande which lies to the east. In essence, these mountains are the southern extension of the South San Juan Range that lies in southern Colorado and northern New Mexico.

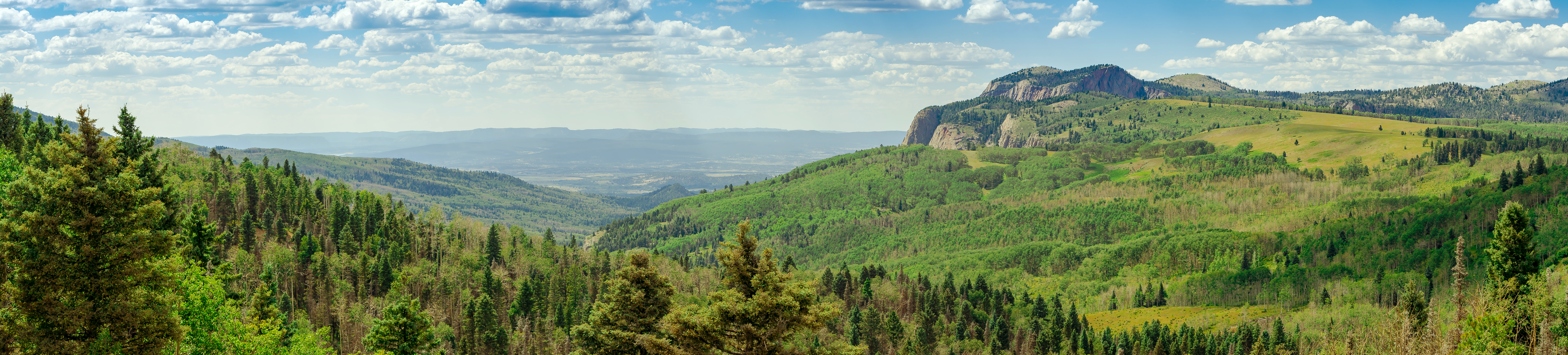
Brazos Mountains overlooking the Chama Valley from Highway 64.

== Geology ==
The Brazos Mountains are the southwestern remnants of a Laramide peneplain resulting from the erosion of mountains formed 80 to 55 million years ago during the Laramide orogeny. To the east and northeast lie the Sangre de Cristo Mountains which share a similar geological history. The Brazos Cliffs, which form a dramatic backdrop to Tierra Amarilla, are formed of Precambrian quartzite.

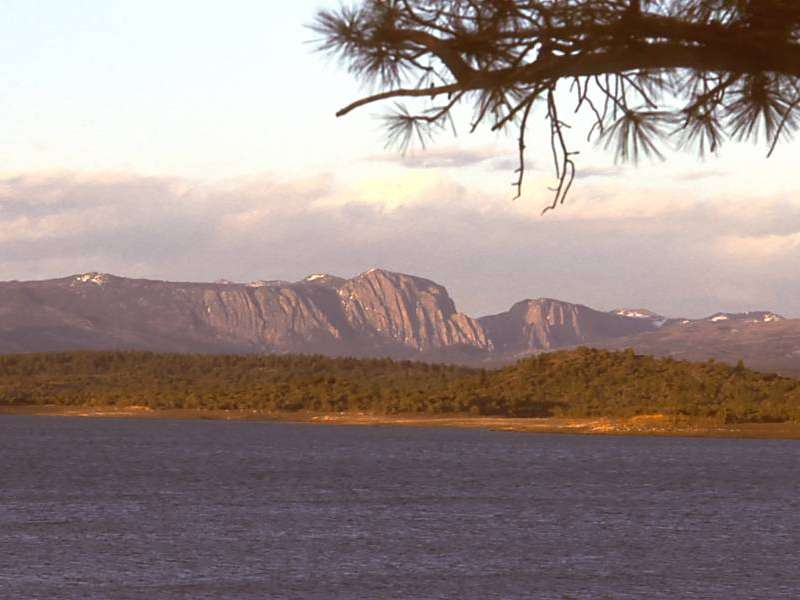
The Brazos Cliffs, looking east at sunset across Heron Lake.
