= La Puente Historic District =

Historic district in La Puente, New Mexico, United States

- U.S. National Register of Historic Places
- Location within New Mexico
- Nearest city: La Puente, New Mexico
- Coordinates: 36°42′01″N 106°36′03″W
- Area: 18 acres (7.3 ha)
- MPS: La Tierra Amarilla MRA
- NRHP reference No.: 85000826
- Added to NRHP: April 4, 1985

The La Puente Historic District in La Puente, New Mexico, was listed on the National Register of Historic Places in 1985.

== Description ==
According to its NRHP nomination,

The village of La Puente is one of the best-preserved examples of a linear village—the most common village type of Hispanic settlement in New Mexico in the nineteenth century. Although the houses respond to Anglo-American attitudes by being free-standing, set back from and facing the street with ornamented porches, they are built of traditional Hispanic materials and most are composed of long files of self-contained rooms. The private courtyard spaces defined by the houses, barns and fences also continue the Hispanic tradition of combining the house and farm buildings in one unit, sometimes called the casa- corral. Among the outbuildings are some of the most outstanding and best-preserved examples of Hispanic barns in New Mexico.

It is an area 18 acres (7.3 ha) in size. It includes all buildings on both sides of the main road in La Puente from, on the east, the drop-off from the second plateau to the first plateau, to, on the west, the church. The district included 37 contributing buildings and two contributing sites.

In 1985, there were 25 houses, six barns, another six outbuildings, one store and a church in the district. Twelve of the houses were built between 1870 and 1895, 11 date from between 1895 and 1920, one dates from 1920 to 1940, and three were built after 1940. They were mostly in good repair and little-modified. Private corral compounds were formed by many of the houses, barns and fences.

== See also ==
- National Register of Historic Places listings in Rio Arriba County, New Mexico
