= New Mexico State Road 111 =

State highway in New Mexico, United States

State Road 111
- NM 111 highlighted in red

Route information
- Maintained by NMDOT
- Length: 19.519 mi (31.413 km)

Major junctions
- South end: US 285 near Ojo Caliente
- NM 554
- North end: CR 450

Location
- Country: United States
- State: New Mexico
- Counties: Taos, Rio Arriba

Highway system
- New Mexico State Highway System; Interstate; US; State; Scenic
← NM 110	→ NM 112

State Road 111 (NM 111) is a state highway in the US state of New Mexico. Its total length is approximately 19.5 miles (31.4 km). NM 111's southern terminus is at U.S. Route 285 (US 285) north of Ojo Caliente, and the northern terminus is at County Road 450.

== Major intersections ==
County	Location	mi	km	Destinations	Notes
Taos	Ojo Caliente	0.000	0.000	US 285	Southern terminus
Rio Arriba		4.931	7.936	NM 554 west	Eastern terminus of NM 554
Rio Arriba		4.971	8.000	NM 519 north	Southern terminus of NM 519
Rio Arriba	Vallecitos	14.271	22.967	NM 576 west	Eastern terminus of NM 576
Rio Arriba		19.519	31.413	CR 450	Northern terminus
1.000 mi = 1.609 km; 1.000 km = 0.621 mi
