= Rutheron, New Mexico =

Unincorporated community in New Mexico, United States

Rutheron
- Unincorporated community
- Location within the state of New Mexico Rutheron (the United States)
- Coordinates: 36°43′07″N 106°36′42″W
- Country: United States
- State: New Mexico
- County: Rio Arriba
- Elevation: 7,287 ft (2,221 m)
- Time zone: UTC-7 (Mountain (MST))
  - Summer (DST): UTC-6 (MDT)
- ZIP codes: 87551
- Area code: 575
- GNIS feature ID: 894227

Rutheron is an unincorporated community located in Rio Arriba County, New Mexico, United States. Rutheron is located on New Mexico State Road 95, 2.8 miles (4.5 km) west-southwest of Los Ojos. Rutheron had its own post office from May 27, 1927, to March 1, 1997.
