= Maxwell, New Mexico =

- Village
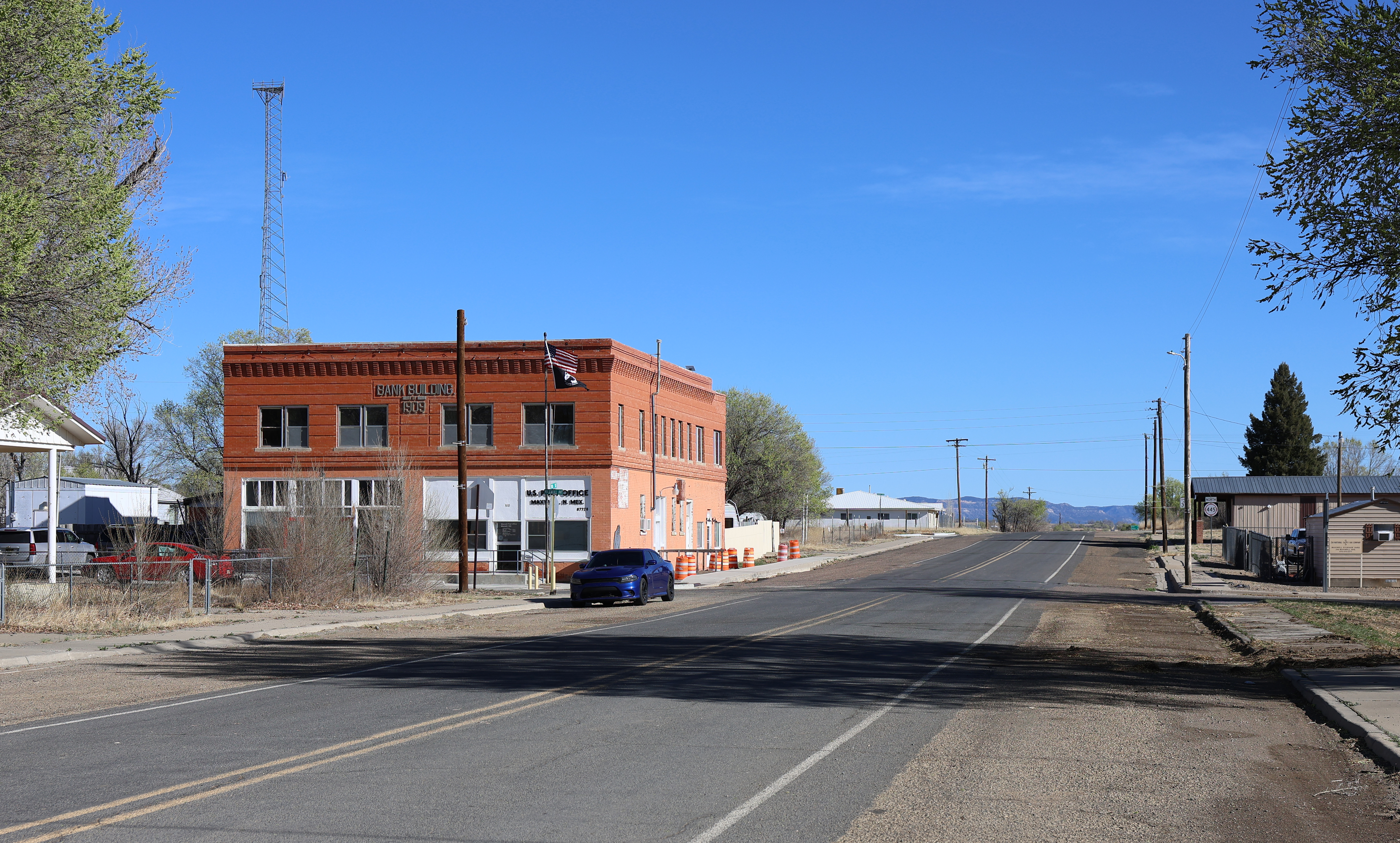
- 3rd Street (2026)

- Location of Maxwell, New Mexico

- Location in the United States
- Coordinates: 36°32′28″N 104°32′35″W
- Country: United States
- State: New Mexico
- County: Colfax

Area
  - Total: 0.47 sq mi (1.23 km^{2})
  - Land: 0.47 sq mi (1.23 km^{2})
  - Water: 0 sq mi (0.00 km^{2})
- Elevation: 5,925 ft (1,806 m)

Population (2020)
  - Total: 224
  - Density: 472.1/sq mi (182.29/km^{2})
- Time zone: UTC-7 (Mountain (MST))
  - Summer (DST): UTC-6 (MDT)
- ZIP code: 87728
- Area code: 575
- FIPS code: 35-47080
- GNIS feature ID: 2413571

Maxwell is a village in Colfax County, New Mexico, United States. As of the 2020 census, Maxwell had a population of 224. Maxwell was established in 1879 as a railroad town on the Atchison, Topeka and Santa Fe Railway. It was named in honor of Lucien Maxwell, who provided the land for the original townsite from his Maxwell Land Grant.

== Geography ==
Maxwell is located near the center of Colfax County in the valley of the Canadian River. Interstate 25 passes through the east side of the village, with access from Exit 426. I-25 leads north 26 miles (42 km) to Raton, the Colfax County seat, and southwest 81 miles (130 km) to Las Vegas.

According to the United States Census Bureau, the village has a total area of 0.47 square miles (1.23 km^{2}), all land.

The United States Fish and Wildlife Service manages the Maxwell National Wildlife Refuge, located 2 miles (3 km) northwest of the village. The refuge offers excellent birding opportunities during the spring and fall migrations. It consists of several lakes, fields and woodlots managed for birds and the area's other wildlife.

== Climate ==
According to the Köppen Climate Classification system, Maxwell has a cold semi-arid climate, abbreviated "BSk" on climate maps. The hottest temperature recorded in Maxwell was 100 °F (37.8 °C) on June 27, 1953, July 4, 1953, July 5, 1953, July 4, 1957, July 3, 1960, July 6, 1966, June 29, 1998, July 13, 2003, and June 28, 2013, while the coldest temperature recorded was −35 °F (−37.2 °C) on January 13, 1963.

Climate data for Maxwell, New Mexico, 1991–2020 normals, extremes 1945–2021
| Month | Jan | Feb | Mar | Apr | May | Jun | Jul | Aug | Sep | Oct | Nov | Dec | Year |
|---|---|---|---|---|---|---|---|---|---|---|---|---|---|
| Record high °F (°C) | 75 (24) | 77 (25) | 84 (29) | 88 (31) | 98 (37) | 100 (38) | 100 (38) | 99 (37) | 95 (35) | 89 (32) | 86 (30) | 77 (25) | 100 (38) |
| Mean daily maximum °F (°C) | 46.8 (8.2) | 50.5 (10.3) | 58.7 (14.8) | 64.9 (18.3) | 73.9 (23.3) | 83.0 (28.3) | 86.2 (30.1) | 84.0 (28.9) | 78.7 (25.9) | 68.1 (20.1) | 55.9 (13.3) | 46.2 (7.9) | 66.4 (19.1) |
| Daily mean °F (°C) | 29.6 (−1.3) | 32.3 (0.2) | 40.1 (4.5) | 46.9 (8.3) | 56.0 (13.3) | 64.9 (18.3) | 69.2 (20.7) | 67.7 (19.8) | 61.3 (16.3) | 49.7 (9.8) | 37.9 (3.3) | 29.1 (−1.6) | 48.7 (9.3) |
| Mean daily minimum °F (°C) | 12.5 (−10.8) | 14.1 (−9.9) | 21.4 (−5.9) | 28.9 (−1.7) | 38.2 (3.4) | 46.8 (8.2) | 52.3 (11.3) | 51.5 (10.8) | 43.8 (6.6) | 31.2 (−0.4) | 20.0 (−6.7) | 11.9 (−11.2) | 31.1 (−0.5) |
| Record low °F (°C) | −35 (−37) | −32 (−36) | −22 (−30) | −3 (−19) | 15 (−9) | 28 (−2) | 35 (2) | 36 (2) | 16 (−9) | −3 (−19) | −24 (−31) | −28 (−33) | −35 (−37) |
| Average precipitation inches (mm) | 0.34 (8.6) | 0.29 (7.4) | 0.70 (18) | 0.81 (21) | 1.64 (42) | 1.89 (48) | 2.58 (66) | 2.47 (63) | 1.64 (42) | 1.01 (26) | 0.35 (8.9) | 0.35 (8.9) | 14.07 (359.8) |
| Average snowfall inches (cm) | 5.2 (13) | 3.5 (8.9) | 3.3 (8.4) | 2.1 (5.3) | 0.1 (0.25) | 0.0 (0.0) | 0.0 (0.0) | 0.0 (0.0) | 0.0 (0.0) | 0.9 (2.3) | 1.9 (4.8) | 4.4 (11) | 21.4 (53.95) |
| Average precipitation days (≥ 0.01 in) | 1.8 | 2.0 | 3.1 | 3.7 | 6.0 | 6.6 | 8.7 | 9.7 | 5.9 | 3.3 | 1.9 | 1.8 | 54.5 |
| Average snowy days (≥ 0.1 in) | 1.6 | 1.8 | 1.4 | 0.8 | 0.1 | 0.0 | 0.0 | 0.0 | 0.0 | 0.5 | 0.8 | 1.6 | 8.6 |
Source 1: NOAA
Source 2: xmACIS2

== Demographics ==
Historical population
| Census | Pop. | Note | %± |
|---|---|---|---|
| 1920 | 384 | | — |
| 1930 | 439 | | 14.3% |
| 1940 | 483 | | 10.0% |
| 1950 | 404 | | −16.4% |
| 1960 | 392 | | −3.0% |
| 1970 | 393 | | 0.3% |
| 1980 | 316 | | −19.6% |
| 1990 | 247 | | −21.8% |
| 2000 | 274 | | 10.9% |
| 2010 | 254 | | −7.3% |
| 2020 | 224 | | −11.8% |
U.S. Decennial Census

As of the census of 2000, there were 274 people, 117 households, and 76 families residing in the village. The population density was 577.5 inhabitants per square mile (223.0/km^{2}). There were 148 housing units at an average density of 311.9 per square mile (120.4/km^{2}). The racial makeup of the village was 86.50% White, 4.01% Native American, 7.30% from other races, and 2.19% from two or more races. Hispanic or Latino of any race were 55.47% of the population.

There were 117 households, out of which 29.9% had children under the age of 18 living with them, 51.3% were married couples living together, 11.1% had a female householder with no husband present, and 34.2% were non-families. 29.9% of all households were made up of individuals, and 14.5% had someone living alone who was 65 years of age or older. The average household size was 2.34 and the average family size was 2.91.

In the village, the population was spread out, with 25.2% under the age of 18, 6.9% from 18 to 24, 24.5% from 25 to 44, 23.7% from 45 to 64, and 19.7% who were 65 years of age or older. The median age was 41 years. For every 100 females, there were 101.5 males. For every 100 females age 18 and over, there were 86.4 males.

The median income for a household in the village was $23,750, and the median income for a family was $28,750. Males had a median income of $22,083 versus $20,625 for females. The per capita income for the village was $11,231. About 22.0% of families and 21.9% of the population were below the poverty line, including 24.6% of those under the age of eighteen and 8.0% of those 65 or over.

== 1964 tornado ==
On May 29, 1964, an F3 tornado struck Maxwell and claimed one life, causing eight injuries. A total of 50 homes were destroyed. It was one of only four F3 tornadoes in New Mexico history.
