= El Rito, Rio Arriba County, New Mexico =

Unincorporated community in Rio Arriba County, New Mexico, US

- Interactive map of El Rito, Rio Arriba County, New Mexico

El Rito (ríto, 'the little river', Tewa: P’iˀą Nugeh Búuˀu) is an unincorporated community in Rio Arriba County, New Mexico, United States. Its elevation is 6,875 feet (2,096 m). The town is located on NM 554, 18 miles (29 km) northwest of Española and 15 miles (24 km) northwest of Ojo Caliente.

El Rito took its name from the creek that passes through the village, originally named El Rito Colorado (the red creek). Tewas call the El Rito region P’iˀą Nugeh 'pink below place' after the El Rito Mountains, known to them as P’iˀą P’in 'pink mountains'. The community was the site of the Tewa pueblo of P’iˀą Nugeh Ówîngeh Kayyee.

El Rito was one of the first Spanish settlements in the Jicarilla Apache lands north of Santa Fe, being settled about 1807. San Juan Nepomuceno Catholic Church is in the town, built between 1827 and 1832. This church has been erroneously claimed to be the oldest church in New Mexico despite multiple churches being built more than 200 year prior to it. The church was restored in the 1980s.

El Rito is surrounded by the Carson National Forest. The community is the home of the Carson National Forest Service – El Rito Ranger District, the El Rito Public Library, the Las Clinicas del Norte, and a campus of Northern New Mexico College. El Rito is the home to a growing number of artists. The El Rito Studio Tour is held in early October Among the artists living in this tiny New Mexico village are Nicholas Herrera known as “The El Rito Santero” and David Michael Kennedy both of whom have work in the Smithsonian.
