= Heron Lake (New Mexico) =

Reservoir in Rio Arriba County, New Mexico, United States

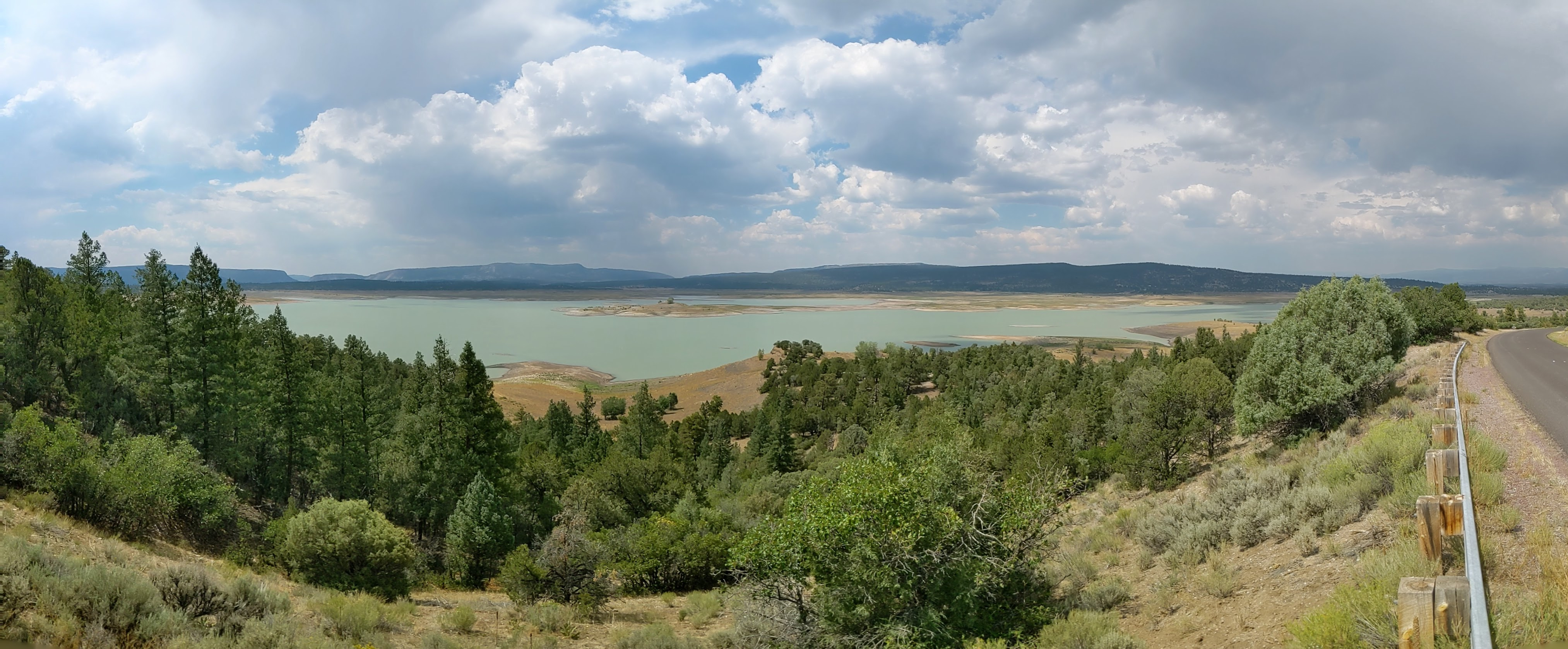
- East across Heron Lake from New Mexico State Road 95, August 2025

- Location within New Mexico Location within the United States
- Location: Rio Arriba County, New Mexico
- Coordinates: 36.69°N 106.69°W
- Type: reservoir
- Primary inflows: Willow Creek
- Primary outflows: Willow Creek
- Basin countries: United States
- Max. length: 4 mi (6 km)
- Max. width: 3 mi (5 km)
- Surface area: 5,900 acres (24 km^{2})
- Water volume: 401,000 acre-feet (495,000,000 m^{3})
- Surface elevation: 7,186 ft (2,190 m)
- Website: Official website

Heron Lake is a reservoir in Rio Arriba County, New Mexico, United States. The reservoir is part of the San Juan–Chama Project, which connects the San Juan River in Colorado to the Rio Chama, which is part of the Rio Grande watershed. Lake Heron is 80 miles northwest of Santa Fe.

== Description ==
Water is impounded in Heron Lake by the 1,250-foot (380 m) long, 263-foot (80 m) high Heron Dam, which was completed in 1971. The 5,900-acre (24 km^{2}) lake is approximately 4 miles (6 km) long and 3 miles (5 km) wide, and lies at an elevation of up to 7,186 feet (2,190 m). Heron Dam is owned and operated by the United States Bureau of Reclamation.

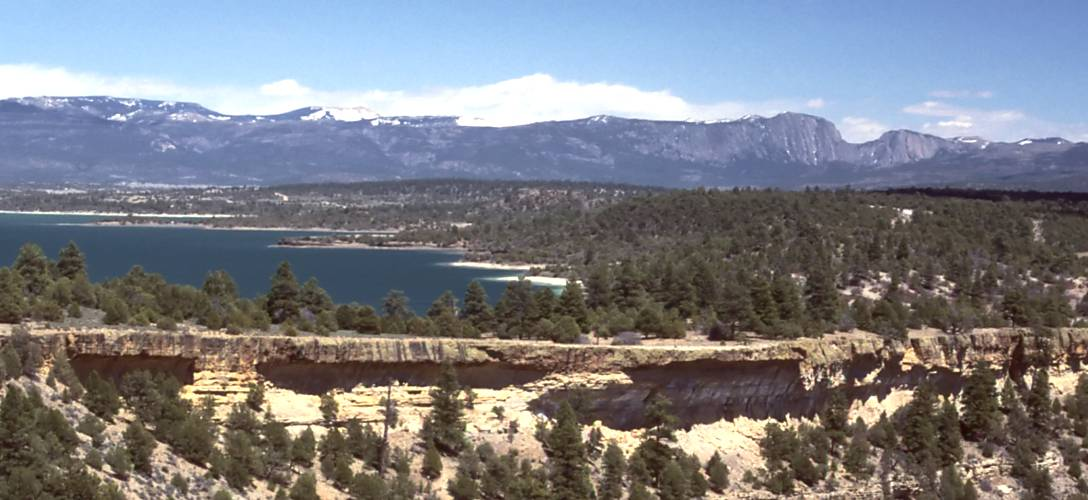
The Brazos Cliffs, Heron Lake, and the north wall of the Rio Chama Gorge, looking east

The southern shore is the location of Heron Lake State Park, featuring over 200 camping and picnic sites, and two improved boat ramps. The lake is a destination for salmon and trout fishing, as well as for small boat sailing. Boat speeds are restricted by a 'no-wake' policy. A 5.5-mile (8.9 km) hiking trail crosses the Rio Chama Gorge via a pedestrian suspension bridge, and then runs southwest through wooded terrain to the grounds of El Vado Lake State Park.

The lake, dam, and state park are named for Kenneth A. Heron, an engineer in the early 1900s who first explored the concept of diverting water from Colorado to the desert regions of southern New Mexico.

== See also ==
- List of dams and reservoirs in New Mexico
