= La Puente, New Mexico =

Unincorporated community in Rio Arriba County, New Mexico, United States

- Unincorporated community
- Location within New Mexico
- Coordinates: 36°42′00″N 106°36′03″W
- Country: United States
- State: New Mexico
- County: Rio Arriba
- Elevation: 7,264 ft (2,214 m)
- Time zone: UTC-7 (Mountain (MST))
  - Summer (DST): UTC-6 (MDT)
- ZIP Code: 87551
- Area code: 575
- GNIS feature ID: 899709

La Puente is an unincorporated community along the Rio Chama in Rio Arriba County, New Mexico, United States. It is roughly 55 miles (89 km) north-northwest of Española and about 20 miles (32 km) south of the Colorado–New Mexico border.

== Description ==
The community is located at the west end of New Mexico State Road 153 (NM 153), which connects with the south end of County Road 340. Officially the west end of NM 153 also connects with the east end of New Mexico State Road 572 (NM 572), which formally continues west to ford the Rio Chama and pass through the unincorporated community of Plaza Blanca before ending at New Mexico State Road 95 (NM 95), south of Rutheron. However, the state has not maintained the river crossing (which is part of the Plaza Blanca Historic District) since 1969, following the construction of NM 95 from Los Ojos to Rutheron.

The La Puente Historic District and the historic La Puente Community Ditch (which passes through the community) are both listed on the National Register of Historic Places
