= El Vado Reservoir =

Reservoir in Rio Arriba County, Arizona, United States

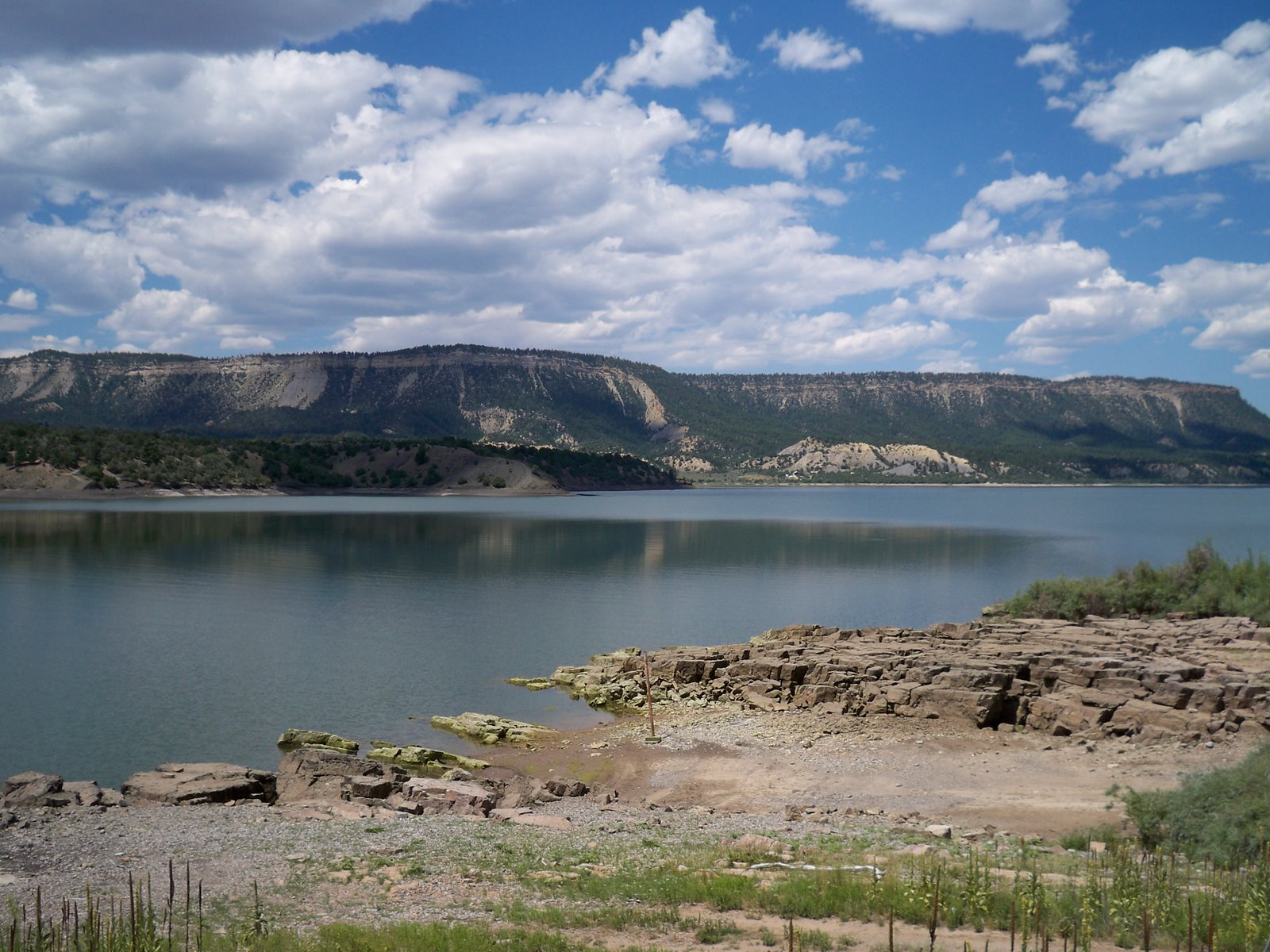
- El Vado Reservoir, August 2009

- Location within New Mexico Location within the United States
- Location: Rio Arriba County, New Mexico
- Coordinates: 36.605°N 106.748°W
- Type: reservoir
- Catchment area: 492 sq mi (1,270 km^{2})
- Basin countries: United States
- Max. length: 5 m (16 ft)
- Max. width: 1 m (3 ft 3 in)
- Surface area: 3,200 acres (1,300 ha)
- Max. depth: 167.1 ft (50.9 m)
- Water volume: 196,500 acre⋅ft (242,400,000 m^{3})
- Surface elevation: 6,900 ft (2,100 m)
- Website: Official website

El Vado Reservoir (also known as El Vado Lake) is a reservoir in Rio Arriba County, New Mexico, United States.

== Description ==
Water is impounded by the earth-filled El Vado Dam, on the Rio Chama, 642 feet (196 m) long and 175 feet (53 m) high, completed in 1935. The 3,200-acre (13 km^{2}) lake is 5 miles (8.0 km) long and over 1 mile (1.6 km) wide, and lies at an elevation of 6,900 feet (2,100 m). The area was formerly part of the Tierra Amarilla Land Grant. The former town of El Vado, which in 1910 had a population of 1,000, is now beneath the waters of El Vado Lake.

== El Vado Lake State Park ==
The eastern shore of the lake is the El Vado Lake State Park, featuring over 100 camping and picnic sites, and two improved boat ramps. The lake is a destination for salmon and trout fishing, as well as for boating. Unlike nearby Heron Lake, boat speeds are not restricted. A 5.5-mile (8.9 km) hiking trail runs to the north, crosses the Rio Chama Gorge via a pedestrian suspension bridge, and then connects to the Heron Lake State Park.

== See also ==
- List of dams and reservoirs in New Mexico
