= Tres Piedras, New Mexico =

Unincorporated community in New Mexico, United States

Coordinates: 36°38′56.04″N 105°58′2.91″W

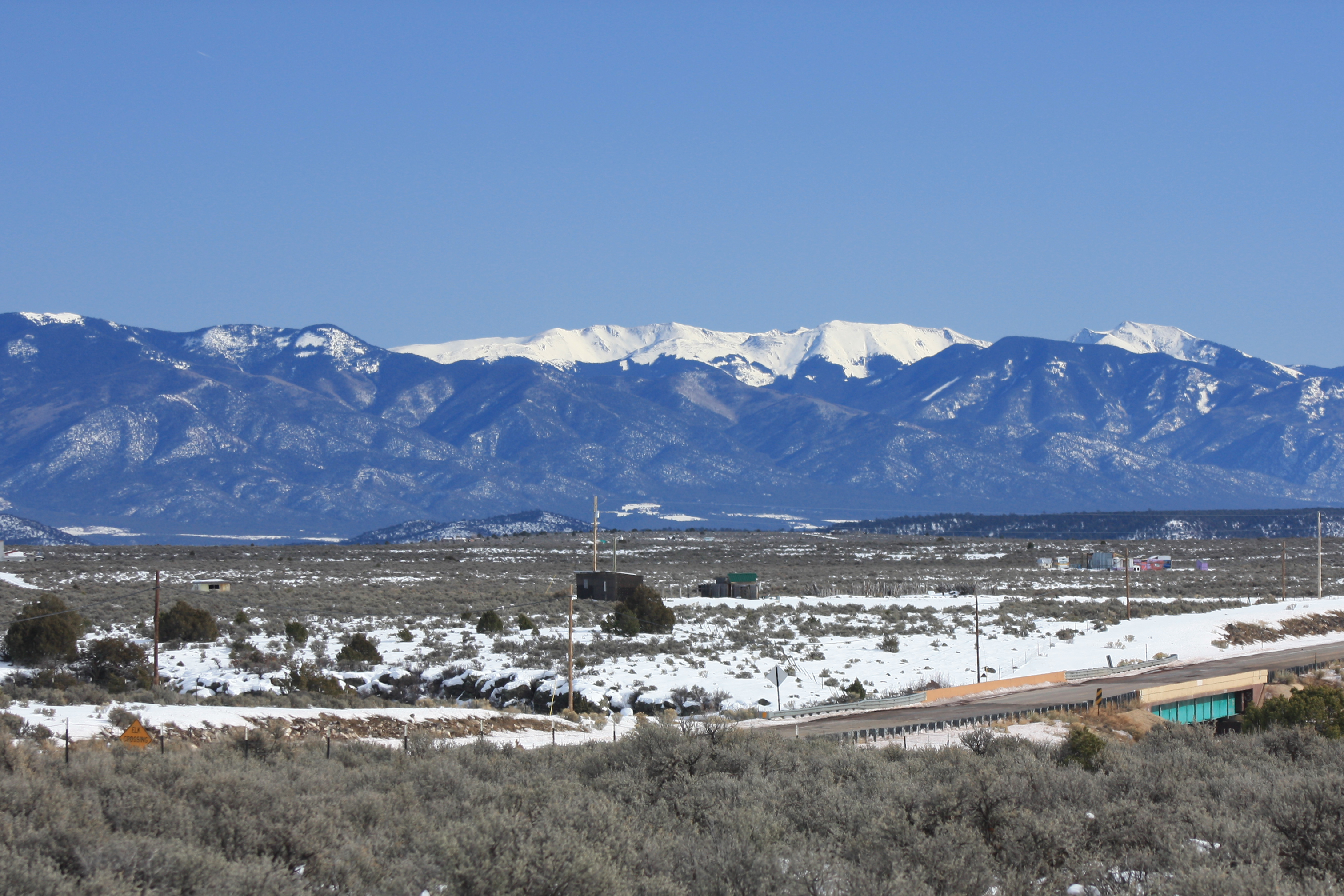
Wheeler Peak of the Sangre de Cristo Mountains from Tres Piedras

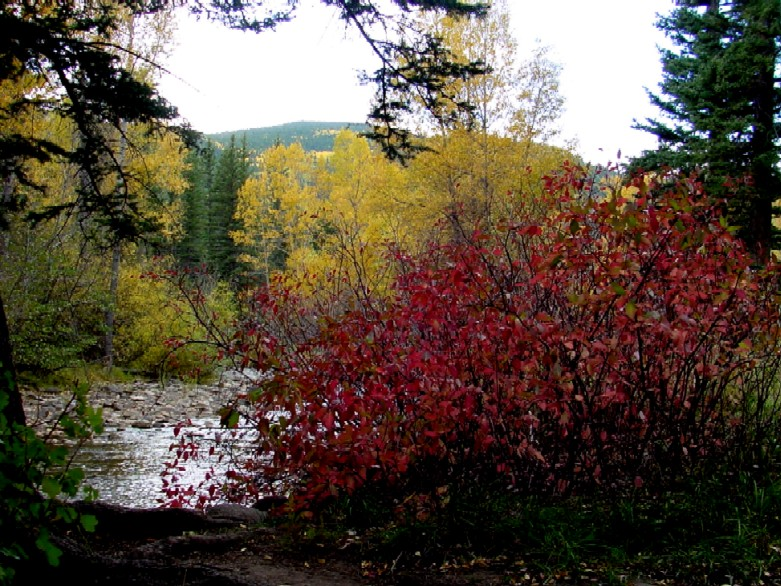
Fall colors in Carson National Forest near Tres Piedras

Tres Piedras (Spanish: three rocks) is an unincorporated community in Taos County, northern New Mexico, United States, adjacent to Carson National Forest.

== Geography ==
Tres Piedras is located approximately 30 miles northwest of Taos, and west of the Rio Grande on U.S. Route 64. At approximately 8,000 feet (2,400 m) in altitude, it is located within the southern portion of the San Juan Range of the Rocky Mountains. Tres Piedras is on the western edge of a sagebrush plain, with ponderosa pines growing throughout the village. The village is adjacent to the Carson National Forest. The ZIP Code for Tres Piedras is 87577.

=== Climate ===
Climate data for Tres Piedras, New Mexico, 1991–2020 normals, 1905-2020 extremes: 8139ft (2481m)
Month	Jan	Feb	Mar	Apr	May	Jun	Jul	Aug	Sep	Oct	Nov	Dec	Year
Record high °F (°C)	61 (16)	67 (19)	71 (22)	80 (27)	87 (31)	95 (35)	93 (34)	92 (33)	89 (32)	89 (32)	74 (23)	64 (18)	95 (35)
Mean maximum °F (°C)	49.7 (9.8)	52.3 (11.3)	62.2 (16.8)	69.1 (20.6)	79.6 (26.4)	85.1 (29.5)	88.3 (31.3)	84.5 (29.2)	80.0 (26.7)	73.2 (22.9)	61.3 (16.3)	51.9 (11.1)	86.6 (30.3)
Mean daily maximum °F (°C)	37.5 (3.1)	40.8 (4.9)	50.3 (10.2)	58.6 (14.8)	66.1 (18.9)	79.0 (26.1)	81.3 (27.4)	77.9 (25.5)	72.3 (22.4)	61.5 (16.4)	47.7 (8.7)	38.5 (3.6)	59.3 (15.2)
Daily mean °F (°C)	22.7 (−5.2)	26.5 (−3.1)	34.9 (1.6)	42.1 (5.6)	49.6 (9.8)	60.9 (16.1)	64.8 (18.2)	62.7 (17.1)	56.3 (13.5)	45.1 (7.3)	32.7 (0.4)	24.2 (−4.3)	43.5 (6.4)
Mean daily minimum °F (°C)	8.0 (−13.3)	12.2 (−11.0)	19.6 (−6.9)	25.6 (−3.6)	33.2 (0.7)	42.7 (5.9)	48.2 (9.0)	47.4 (8.6)	40.4 (4.7)	28.8 (−1.8)	17.6 (−8.0)	9.9 (−12.3)	27.8 (−2.3)
Mean minimum °F (°C)	−7.6 (−22.0)	−4.9 (−20.5)	1.7 (−16.8)	13.0 (−10.6)	23.1 (−4.9)	31.0 (−0.6)	40.0 (4.4)	40.4 (4.7)	30.9 (−0.6)	12.7 (−10.7)	−0.7 (−18.2)	−6.1 (−21.2)	−11.2 (−24.0)
Record low °F (°C)	−35 (−37)	−35 (−37)	−23 (−31)	−4 (−20)	11 (−12)	16 (−9)	25 (−4)	27 (−3)	15 (−9)	−5 (−21)	−22 (−30)	−37 (−38)	−37 (−38)
Average precipitation inches (mm)	0.92 (23)	0.70 (18)	1.05 (27)	0.70 (18)	0.97 (25)	1.23 (31)	2.20 (56)	2.99 (76)	1.24 (31)	1.16 (29)	0.85 (22)	0.82 (21)	14.83 (377)
Average snowfall inches (cm)	8.8 (22)	10.1 (26)	3.4 (8.6)	1.0 (2.5)	0.1 (0.25)	0.0 (0.0)	0.0 (0.0)	0.0 (0.0)	0.0 (0.0)	0.8 (2.0)	3.3 (8.4)	11.4 (29)	38.9 (98.75)
Source 1: NOAA (1981-2010 precipitation & snowfall)
Source 2: XMACIS2 (records & monthly max/mins)

== History ==
The earliest maps, from the 1770s, show the name Piedras de los Carneros, or Rocks of the Sheep, possibly denoting a population of bighorn sheep. While the mountains and valleys east of the Rio Grande were colonized by Spanish agriculturalists & pastoralists some 200 years earlier, the Taos Plateau and Tusas Mountains were used by the nomadic peoples: Ute, Comanche, Kiowa and Jicarilla Apache, and so weren't utilized by the pobladores or Hispano colonists until well after the Mexican-American War (1846–1848) and subsequent presence of the U. S. Army.

The village, named for three outcroppings of granite, was settled in 1879 and became a small ranching and timber village. Homesteaders, sawmills, small scale dry farming and mining activity slowly augmented the population through the late nineteenth and early twentieth centuries. Some Mormon pioneers from the San Luis valley to the north also made their way to Tres Piedras and established themselves.

By the turn of the twentieth century several villages were established in the area: Hopewell, 20 miles to the west, a gold-mining town; Las Tusas, nine miles west, a largely Hispanic farming community spread along the river valley of the same name, and No Agua (no water), 9 miles north on the railway line. All three of these places are virtually uninhabited today. Between 1880 and 1941 Tres Piedras was a railroad stop on the narrow gauge Chili Line railroad that operated between Antonito, Colorado and Santa Fe, New Mexico. The village still has the old railroad water tower.

== Recreation ==
It is a granite climbing area, one of two west of the Rio Grande in New Mexico.
