= Tierra Amarilla, New Mexico =

- Census-designated place
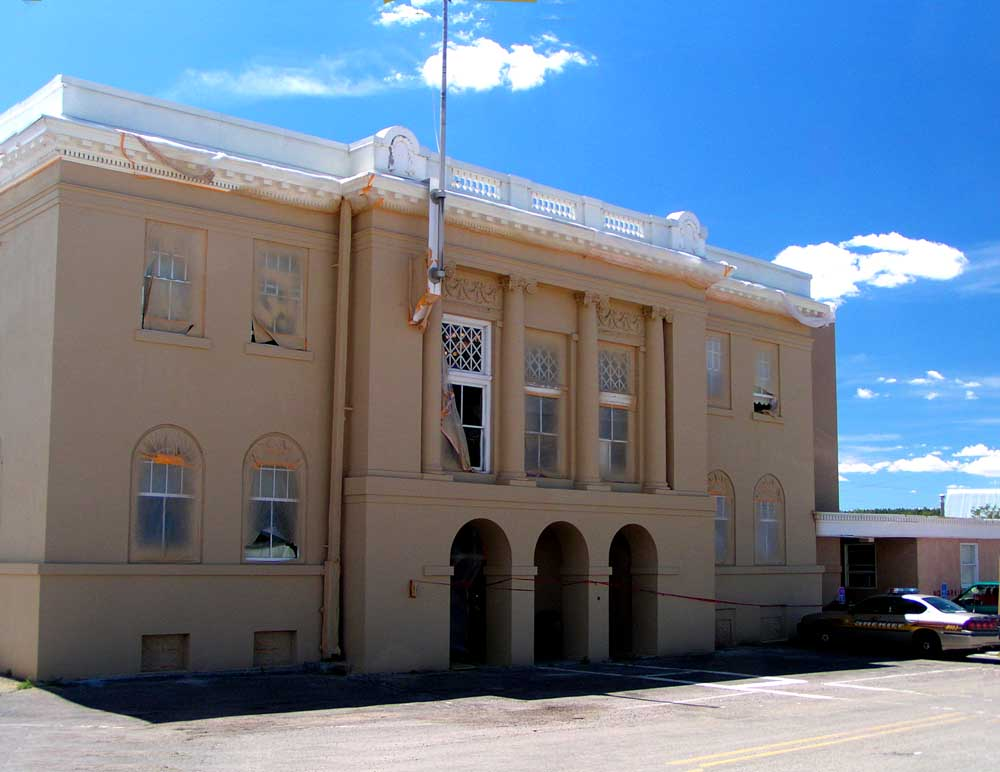
- Rio Arriba County Courthouse, Isaac Rapp, 1916-17

- Location within the state of New Mexico Tierra Amarilla (the United States)
- Coordinates: 36°42′22″N 106°33′35″W
- Country: United States
- State: New Mexico
- County: Rio Arriba

Area
  - Total: 2.69 sq mi (6.98 km^{2})
  - Land: 2.69 sq mi (6.96 km^{2})
  - Water: 0.0039 sq mi (0.01 km^{2})
- Elevation: 7,487 ft (2,282 m)

Population (2020)
  - Total: 297
  - Density: 110.5/sq mi (42.65/km^{2})
- Time zone: UTC−7 (MST)
  - Summer (DST): UTC−6 (MDT)
- ZIP code: 87575
- Area code: 575
- FIPS code: 35-77670
- GNIS feature ID: 2584225
- Website: www.sangres.com/newmexico/rioarriba/tierraamarilla.htm

Tierra Amarilla is a census-designated place in and the county seat of Rio Arriba County, New Mexico, United States. As of the 2020 census, Tierra Amarilla had a population of 297.

Tierra Amarilla is Spanish for "Yellow Earth". The name refers to clay deposits found in the Chama River Valley and used by Native American peoples. Tewa and Navajo toponyms for the area also refer to the yellow clay.

== History ==
There is evidence of 5000 years of habitation in the Chama River Valley including pueblo sites south of Abiquiu. The area served as a trade route for peoples in the present-day Four Corners region and the Rio Grande Valley. Navajos later used the valley as a staging area for raids on Spanish settlements along the Rio Grande. Written accounts of the Tierra Amarilla locality by pathfinding Spanish friars in 1776 described it as suitable for pastoral and agricultural use. The route taken by the friars from Santa Fe to California became the Spanish Trail. During the Californian Gold Rush the area became a staging point for westward fortune seekers.

=== Tierra Amarilla Grant ===
The Tierra Amarilla Land Grant was created in 1832 by the Mexican government for Manuel Martinez and settlers from Abiquiu. The land grant encompassed a more general area than the contemporary community known as Tierra Amarilla. The grant holders were unable to maintain a permanent settlement due to "raids by Utes, Navajos and Jicarilla Apaches" until early in the 1860s. In 1860 the United States Congress confirmed the land grant as a private grant, rather than a community grant, due to mistranslated and concealed documents. Although a land patent for the grant required the completion of a geographical survey before issuance, some of Manuel Martinez' heirs began to sell the land to Anglo speculators. In 1880 Thomas Catron sold some of the grant to the Denver and Rio Grande Railway for the construction of their San Juan line and a service center at Chama. By 1883 Catron had consolidated the deeds he held for the whole of the grant sans the original villages and their associated fields. In 1950, the descendants of the original grant holders' court petitions to reclaim communal land were rebuked.

=== Rio Arriba's county seat ===
In 1866 the United States Army established Camp Plummer just south of Los Ojos (established in 1860) to rein in already decreased Native American activity on the grant. The military encampment was deserted in 1869. Las Nutrias, the site of the contemporary community, was founded nearby c.1862. The first post office in Las Nutrias was established in 1866 and bore the name Tierra Amarilla, as did the present one which was established in 1870 after an approximately two-year absence. In 1877 a U.S. Army lieutenant described the village as "the center of the Mexican population of northwestern New Mexico". The territorial legislature located Rio Arriba's county seat in Las Nutrias and renamed the village in 1880. The Denver and Rio Grande Railway's 1881 arrival at Chama, about ten miles to the north, had profound effects on the development of the region by bringing the area out of economic and cultural isolation.

When Tierra Amarilla was designated as the county seat the villagers set about building a courthouse. This structure was demolished to make way for the present one, which was built in 1917 and gained notoriety fifty years later when it was the location of a gunfight between land rights activists and authorities. The neoclassical design by Isaac Rapp is now on the National Register of Historic Places.

=== Courthouse raid ===
The Alianza Federal de Mercedes, led by Reies Tijerina, raided the Rio Arriba County Courthouse in 1967. Attempting to make a citizen's arrest of the district attorney "to bring attention to the unscrupulous means by which government and Anglo settlers had usurped Hispanic land grant properties," an armed struggle in the courthouse ensued resulting in Tijerina and his group fleeing to the south with two prisoners as hostages. Eulogio Salazar, a prison guard, was shot and Daniel Rivera, a sheriff's deputy, was badly injured. The National Guard, FBI and New Mexico State Police successfully pursued Tijerina, who was sentenced to less than three years.

== Geography ==
The Brazos Cliffs are a prominent nearby landmark and attraction. Also nearby are the artificial Heron Lake and El Vado Lake. Tierra Amarilla's elevation is 7,524 feet above sea level.

=== Layout ===
The settlement is situated in a cluster of villages along U.S. Route 84 and the Chama River. The layout of the villages, including the one that became Tierra Amarilla, do not follow the urban planning principles of the Laws of the Indies.

== Climate ==
Tierra Amarilla has a humid continental climate (Köppen Dfb) with very cold, snowy, though generally sunny winters, and summers featuring very warm to hot afternoons and cold to cool mornings. During the winter, mornings are frigid, with as many as 26.7 falling to or below 0 °F or −17.8 °C, although maxima top freezing on all but nineteen afternoons during an average winter. The coldest temperature has been −39 °F (−39.4 °C) on January 6, 1971. Snowfall is much heavier than in more populated parts of New Mexico as Tierra Amarilla is located on a western slope rather than in a valley: the annual average is 62.2 inches or 1.58 metres with a maximum of 55.9 inches (1.42 m) in January 1997 and a maximum annual total of 125.5 inches (3.19 m) between July 1996 and June 1997. The maximum snow depth has been 44 inches or 1.12 metres on 30 November 1983.

The spring season sees the sunniest weather of all and steadily warming temperatures, although over the year as a whole 224.9 mornings fall to or below freezing, with four freezes to be expected as late as June. The summer, although seeing diurnal temperature ranges of over 34 °F or 18.9 °C, is the wettest period due to frequent monsoonal thunderstorms. The wettest months have been September 1927 and August 1967 which each saw 5.96 inches (151.4 mm) of precipitation, the wettest calendar year 1986 with 24.85 inches (631.2 mm), and the driest 1956 with 8.63 inches (219.2 mm).

Climate data for Tierra Amarilla 4 N, New Mexico, 1991–2020 normals, 1927-2020 extremes: 7464ft (2275m)
Month	Jan	Feb	Mar	Apr	May	Jun	Jul	Aug	Sep	Oct	Nov	Dec	Year
Record high °F (°C)	60 (16)	65 (18)	74 (23)	80 (27)	91 (33)	95 (35)	102 (39)	97 (36)	90 (32)	85 (29)	72 (22)	66 (19)	102 (39)
Mean maximum °F (°C)	54.1 (12.3)	55.6 (13.1)	64.0 (17.8)	70.7 (21.5)	80.5 (26.9)	87.3 (30.7)	91.3 (32.9)	88.7 (31.5)	82.7 (28.2)	75.5 (24.2)	63.5 (17.5)	53.5 (11.9)	90.2 (32.3)
Mean daily maximum °F (°C)	40.2 (4.6)	43.3 (6.3)	51.2 (10.7)	58.8 (14.9)	68.1 (20.1)	79.5 (26.4)	83.3 (28.5)	80.9 (27.2)	73.9 (23.3)	62.5 (16.9)	50.4 (10.2)	40.0 (4.4)	61.0 (16.1)
Daily mean °F (°C)	22.9 (−5.1)	26.6 (−3.0)	34.7 (1.5)	41.5 (5.3)	49.7 (9.8)	58.9 (14.9)	64.8 (18.2)	63.2 (17.3)	55.7 (13.2)	44.7 (7.1)	33.6 (0.9)	23.9 (−4.5)	43.4 (6.3)
Mean daily minimum °F (°C)	5.7 (−14.6)	9.8 (−12.3)	18.2 (−7.7)	24.2 (−4.3)	31.3 (−0.4)	38.3 (3.5)	46.3 (7.9)	45.5 (7.5)	37.5 (3.1)	26.8 (−2.9)	16.8 (−8.4)	7.8 (−13.4)	25.7 (−3.5)
Mean minimum °F (°C)	−10.3 (−23.5)	−8.0 (−22.2)	1.9 (−16.7)	12.4 (−10.9)	21.8 (−5.7)	28.8 (−1.8)	37.7 (3.2)	38.7 (3.7)	25.9 (−3.4)	14.3 (−9.8)	0.5 (−17.5)	−8.7 (−22.6)	−13.9 (−25.5)
Record low °F (°C)	−39 (−39)	−40 (−40)	−16 (−27)	−9 (−23)	12 (−11)	21 (−6)	31 (−1)	29 (−2)	19 (−7)	5 (−15)	−19 (−28)	−31 (−35)	−40 (−40)
Average precipitation inches (mm)	1.20 (30)	1.32 (34)	0.95 (24)	1.15 (29)	1.50 (38)	0.69 (18)	1.74 (44)	2.19 (56)	1.93 (49)	1.37 (35)	1.22 (31)	1.31 (33)	16.57 (421)
Average snowfall inches (cm)	17.70 (45.0)	15.30 (38.9)	9.80 (24.9)	6.60 (16.8)	0.70 (1.8)	0.00 (0.00)	0.00 (0.00)	0.00 (0.00)	0.00 (0.00)	1.60 (4.1)	8.40 (21.3)	15.00 (38.1)	75.1 (190.9)
Source 1: NOAA
Source 2: XMACIS2 (records & monthly max/mins)

Climate data for Tierra Amarilla, New Mexico (1927 to 2012)
Month	Jan	Feb	Mar	Apr	May	Jun	Jul	Aug	Sep	Oct	Nov	Dec	Year
Record high °F (°C)	60 (16)	64 (18)	74 (23)	80 (27)	91 (33)	95 (35)	102 (39)	97 (36)	90 (32)	82 (28)	72 (22)	64 (18)	102 (39)
Mean daily maximum °F (°C)	38.9 (3.8)	42.4 (5.8)	49.1 (9.5)	59.0 (15.0)	68.5 (20.3)	78.6 (25.9)	83.1 (28.4)	80.5 (26.9)	74.2 (23.4)	63.3 (17.4)	49.4 (9.7)	39.7 (4.3)	60.6 (15.9)
Daily mean °F (°C)	22.1 (−5.5)	26.1 (−3.3)	33.7 (0.9)	42.0 (5.6)	50.3 (10.2)	58.9 (14.9)	64.9 (18.3)	63.2 (17.3)	56.0 (13.3)	45.5 (7.5)	33.1 (0.6)	23.8 (−4.6)	43.3 (6.3)
Mean daily minimum °F (°C)	5.2 (−14.9)	9.8 (−12.3)	18.2 (−7.7)	25.0 (−3.9)	32.1 (0.1)	39.2 (4.0)	46.7 (8.2)	45.9 (7.7)	37.8 (3.2)	27.7 (−2.4)	16.7 (−8.5)	7.8 (−13.4)	26.0 (−3.3)
Record low °F (°C)	−39 (−39)	−30 (−34)	−16 (−27)	−8 (−22)	12 (−11)	21 (−6)	31 (−1)	29 (−2)	19 (−7)	5 (−15)	−19 (−28)	−31 (−35)	−39 (−39)
Average precipitation inches (mm)	1.26 (32)	1.13 (29)	1.16 (29)	1.03 (26)	1.09 (28)	0.80 (20)	1.97 (50)	2.46 (62)	1.83 (46)	1.30 (33)	1.04 (26)	1.16 (29)	16.23 (410)
Average snowfall inches (cm)	15.1 (38)	11.7 (30)	9.4 (24)	4.1 (10)	0.4 (1.0)	0.0 (0.0)	0.0 (0.0)	0.0 (0.0)	0.0 (0.0)	1.4 (3.6)	7.7 (20)	12.4 (31)	62.2 (157.6)
Average precipitation days (≥ 0.01 inch)	6	6	6	6	5	5	10	11	7	5	5	6	77
Source: Western Regional Climate Center

== Demographics ==
Historical population
Census	Pop.	Note	%±
2020	297		—
U.S. Decennial Census

Tierra Amarilla has the ZIP code of 87575. The ZIP Code Tabulation Area for ZIP Code 87575 had a population of 750 at the 2000 census.

== Education ==
It is within the Chama Valley Independent Schools school district. The two schools in the community are: Tierra Amarilla Elementary School (PreK-6) and Escalante Middle/High School (7–12).

== Notable people ==
- Walter K. Martinez, New Mexico lawyer and state legislator, was born in Tierra Amarilla.
- Sabine Ulibarrí, American poet, born in Tierra Amarilla.

== See also ==
- List of census-designated places in New Mexico
- Spanish land grants in New Mexico
