= List of New Mexico State Roads shorter than one mile =

- Standard route signage in New Mexico

Highway names
- Interstates: Interstate XX (I-XX)
- US Highways: U.S. Route XX (US XX)
- State: State Road XX (NM XX)

System links
- New Mexico State Highway System; Interstate; US; State; Scenic

There are 26 state roads that are shorter than one mile (1.6 km) long in the U.S. state of New Mexico that are maintained by the New Mexico Department of Transportation. The shortest, State Road 446, is a quarter-mile (402 m) long and serves to connect Valmora to State Road 97. State Road 597, the second shortest highway, links U.S. Route 160 to the Four Corners Monument, a tourist destination on the Navajo Nation where the states of Utah, Arizona, New Mexico, and Colorado meet. In contrast, the longest state road in New Mexico is State Road 120, which is 119.031 miles (191.562 km) long.

== State Road 99 ==
State Road 99
- Location: Albuquerque
- Existed: yes

State Road 99 (NM 99) was a very short state highway in Albuquerque. The highway began at Central Avenue (former US 66) and ended at the Johnson Gym within the University of New Mexico. The exact dates of existence are unknown.

Browse numbered routes
← NM 98	→ NM 100

== State Road 106 ==
State Road 106
- Location: Sombrillo
- Length: 0.752 mi (1,210 m)

State Road 106 (NM 106) is a 0.752-mile-long (1.210 km) state highway in Santa Fe County. The highway begins at a four way intersection with concurrent U.S. Route 84 (US 84 ) / US 285 and NM 399. The highway travels north through Sombrillo, over the Santa Cruz River to a t-intersection with NM 76.

Browse numbered routes
← NM 105	→ NM 107

== State Road 138 ==
State Road 138
- Location: Las Cruces
- Length: 0.670 mi (1,078 m)

State Road 138 (NM 138) is a 0.670-mile-long (1.078 km) state highway in Doña Ana County. The highway begins at a four-way intersection with NM 478 and Watson Lane, traveling eastbound on Tortugas Drive to an intersection with Espina Street. The highway turns north and terminates at Stern Drive just east of Interstate 10.

Browse numbered routes
← NM 137	→ NM 140

== State Road 144 ==
State Road 144
- Location: San Miguel County
- Length: 0.330 mi (531 m)

State Road 144 (NM 144) is a 0.330-mile-long (0.531 km) state highway in San Miguel County. The highway begins at an intersection with NM 65 and ends at the Camp Luna Technical Vocational Institute.

Browse numbered routes
← NM 143	→ NM 145

== State Road 158 ==
State Road 158
- Location: Hill
- Length: 0.900 mi (1,448 m)

State Road 158 (NM 158) is a 0.900-mile-long (1.448 km) state highway in Doña Ana County. The highway begins at an intersection with NM 185 and travels northeast along Lujan Hill Road to its eastern terminus at Doña Ana Road. The roadway continues east as County Highway D053.

Browse numbered routes
← NM 157	→ NM 159

== State Road 177 ==
State Road 177
- Location: Elephant Butte Lake State Park
- Length: 0.835 mi (1,344 m)

State Road 177 (NM 177) is a 0.835-mile-long (1.344 km) state highway in Sierra County. The highway forms a loop from NM 51 near the Elephant Butte Lake State Park. NM 177 is the southern terminus of NM 195.

Browse numbered routes
← NM 176	→ NM 179

== State Road 183 ==
State Road 183
- Location: La Union
- Length: 0.598 mi (962 m)

State Road 183 (NM 183), also called Vinton Road, is a 0.598-mile-long (0.962 km) state highway in Doña Ana County. The highway's western terminus is at NM 28 north of La Union and the eastern terminus is at the end of state maintenance as a continuation of Vinton Road towards the Texas state line. NM 183 was formally part of NM 273.

Browse numbered routes
← NM 182	→ NM 184

== State Road 184 ==
State Road 184
- Location: Santa Teresa
- Length: 0.567 mi (912 m)
- Existed: 1988–

State Road 184 (NM 184), also called Country Club Road, is a 0.567-mile-long (0.912 km) state highway in Doña Ana County. The highway's western terminus is at NM 273 south of Las Cruces and the eastern terminus is a continuation as Country Club Road at the Texas state line in Santa Teresa.

Browse numbered routes
← NM 183	→ NM 185

== State Road 233 ==
State Road 233
- Location: Medanales
- Length: 0.850 mi (1,368 m)

State Road 233 (NM 233) is a 0.850-mile-long (1.368 km) state highway in Rio Arriba County. The highway begins at a t-intersection with US 84, northeasterly over the Chama River before terminating at County Road 142 south of Medanales.

Browse numbered routes
← NM 231	→ NM 234

== State Road 286 ==
State Road 286
- Location: East of Tucumcari
- Length: 0.781 mi (1,257 m)

State Road 286 (NM 286) is a 0.781-mile-long (1.257 km) state highway in Quay County, east of Tucumcari. The southern terminus is at FR 4118, and the northern terminus is at the end of state maintenance.

Browse numbered routes
← NM 284	→ NM 288

== State Road 305 ==
State Road 305
- Location: West of Lindrith
- Length: 0.500 mi (805 m)

State Road 305 (NM 305) is a 0.500-mile-long (0.805 km) state highway in Rio Arriba County, west of Lindrith. The southern terminus is at the end of state maintenance at the Rio Arriba/ Sandoval County line, and the northern terminus is at NM 595. The portion from NM 96 in Regina to the Rio Arriba/ Sandoval County line was transferred to Sandoval County on October 3, 1988 in a road exchange agreement.

Browse numbered routes
← NM 304	→ NM 309

== State Road 315 ==
State Road 315
- Location: In Algodones
- Length: 0.479 mi (771 m)

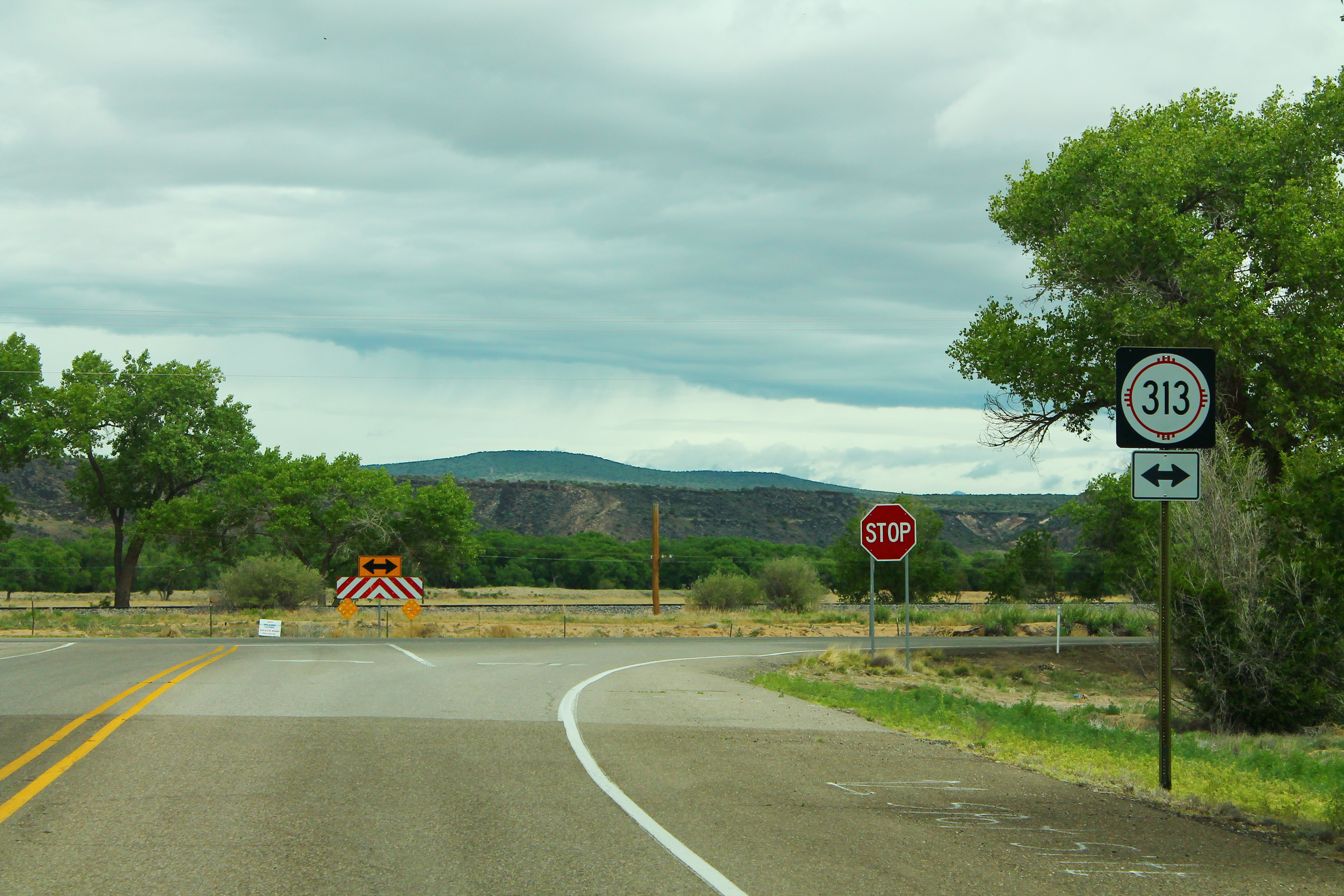
NM 315 approaching NM 313

State Road 315 (NM 315) is a 0.479-mile-long (0.771 km) state highway in Sandoval County. The highways western terminus is at NM 313, it then begins traveling east intersecting I-25 and US 85 before reaching the eastern terminus at FR 2532.

Browse numbered routes
← NM 314	→ NM 316

== State Road 327 ==
State Road 327
- Location: Isleta Village Proper
- Length: 0.560 mi (901 m)

State Road 327 (NM 327) is a 0.560-mile-long (0.901 km) state highway in Bernalillo County. The highway begins at the BNSF Railway line along Isleta Lake Road, traveling east to its terminus at NM 47, just south of Interstate 25.

Browse numbered routes
← NM 325	→ NM 329

== State Road 395 ==
State Road 395
- Location: East of Tinnie
- Length: 0.480 mi (772 m)

State Road 395 (NM 395) is a 0.480-mile-long (0.772 km) state highway in Lincoln County. The highway begins at the south abutment of the Rio Hondo bridge, and travels north to an intersection with concurrent U.S. Routes 70 and 380.

Browse numbered routes
← NM 392	→ NM 399

== State Road 414 ==
State Road 414
- Location: Ojo Caliente
- Length: 0.350 mi (563 m)

State Road 414 (NM 414) is a 0.350-mile-long (0.563 km) state highway in Taos County. The highway begins at US 285 in Ojo Caliente, and travels west to the end of state maintenance.

Browse numbered routes
← NM 413	→ NM 415

== State Road 446 ==
State Road 446
- Location: Valmora
- Length: 0.250 mi (402 m)

State Road 446 (NM 446) is a 0.250-mile-long (0.402 km) state highway in Mora County. The highway is the shortest state road in New Mexico. The highway begins at a t-intersection with NM 97, and parallels Wolf Creek before terminating just south of Valmora.

Browse numbered routes
← NM 445	→ NM 448

== State Road 450 ==
State Road 450
- Location: Valmora
- Length: 0.349 mi (562 m)

State Road 450 (NM 450) is a 0.349-mile-long (0.562 km) state highway in Mora County. The highway begins at a t-intersection with NM 97, before terminating at the end of State maintenance.

Browse numbered routes
← NM 448	→ NM 451

== State Road 461 ==
State Road 461
- Location: Coyote
- Length: 0.490 mi (789 m)

State Road 461 (NM 461) is a 0.490-mile-long (0.789 km) state highway in Lincoln County in Coyote. The western terminus is at US 54 north of Carrizozo, and the eastern terminus is at the end of route in Coyote.

Browse numbered routes
← NM 460	→ NM 462

== State Road 473 ==
State Road 473
- Location: Bernalillo
- Length: 0.548 mi (882 m)

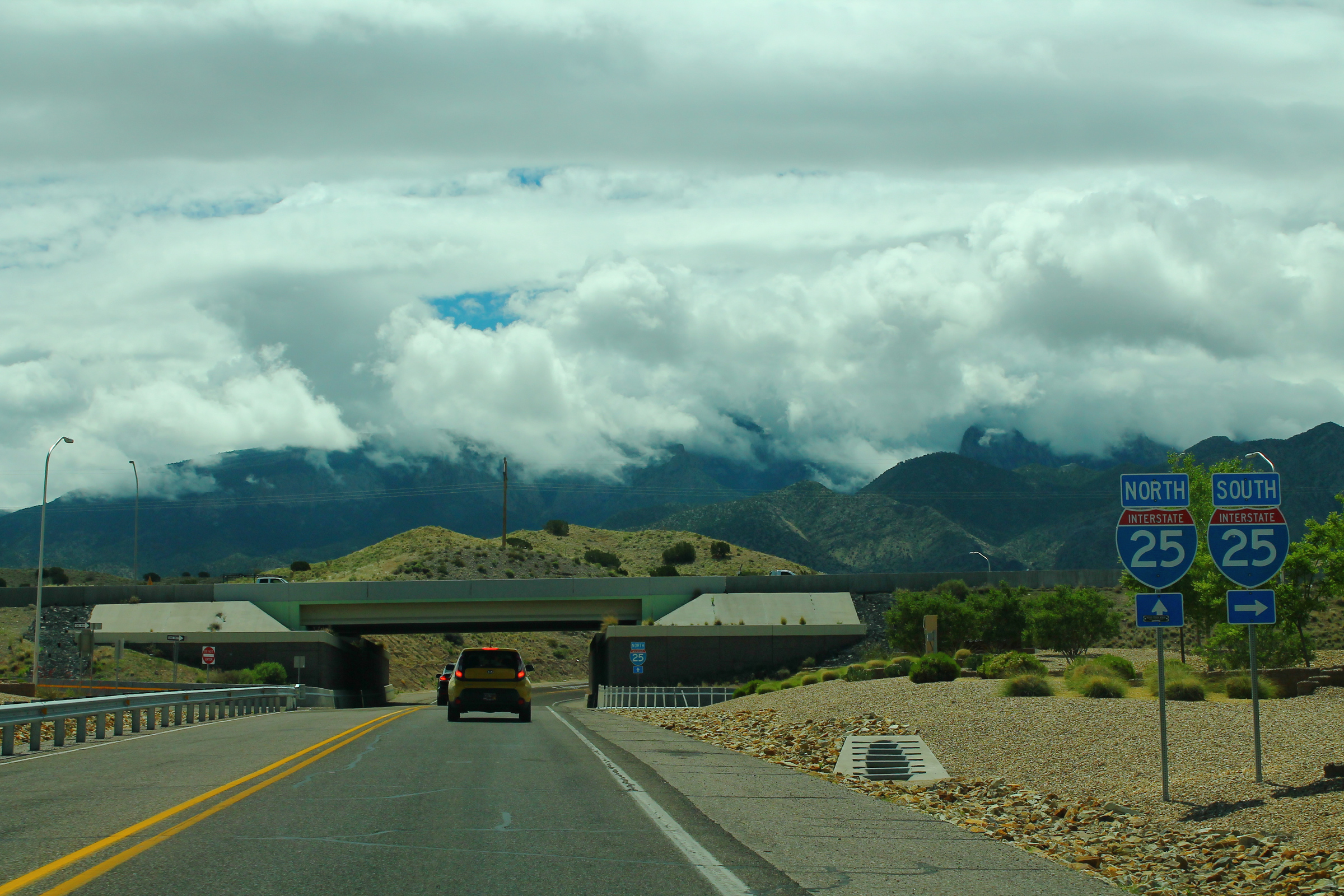
NM 473 approaching I-25

State Road 473 (NM 473) is a 0.548-mile-long (0.882 km) state highway in Sandoval County. The highway begins at exit 240 off of Interstate 25 traveling northwest along Bernalillo Avenue over a level crossing to an intersection with NM 313 in downtown Bernalillo.

Browse numbered routes
← NM 472	→ NM 475

== State Road 498 ==
State Road 498
- Location: Sunland Park
- Length: 0.932 mi (1,500 m)

State Road 498 (NM 498) is a 0.932-mile-long (1.500 km) state highway in Doña Ana County. The highway begins at an intersection with NM 273 northeast as Racetrack Drive, over the Rio Grande before terminating at the Texas state line.

Browse numbered routes
← NM 494	→ NM 500

== State Road 513 ==
State Road 513
- Location: East of Scholle
- Length: 0.700 mi (1,127 m)

State Road 513 (NM 513) is a 0.700-mile-long (1.127 km) state highway in Torrance County. The highway begins at a junction with U.S. Route 60 and travels north to the Salinas Pueblo Missions National Monument east of Scholle.

Browse numbered routes
← NM 512	→ NM 514

== State Road 533 ==
State Road 533
- Location: North of Rodeo
- Length: 0.800 mi (1,287 m)

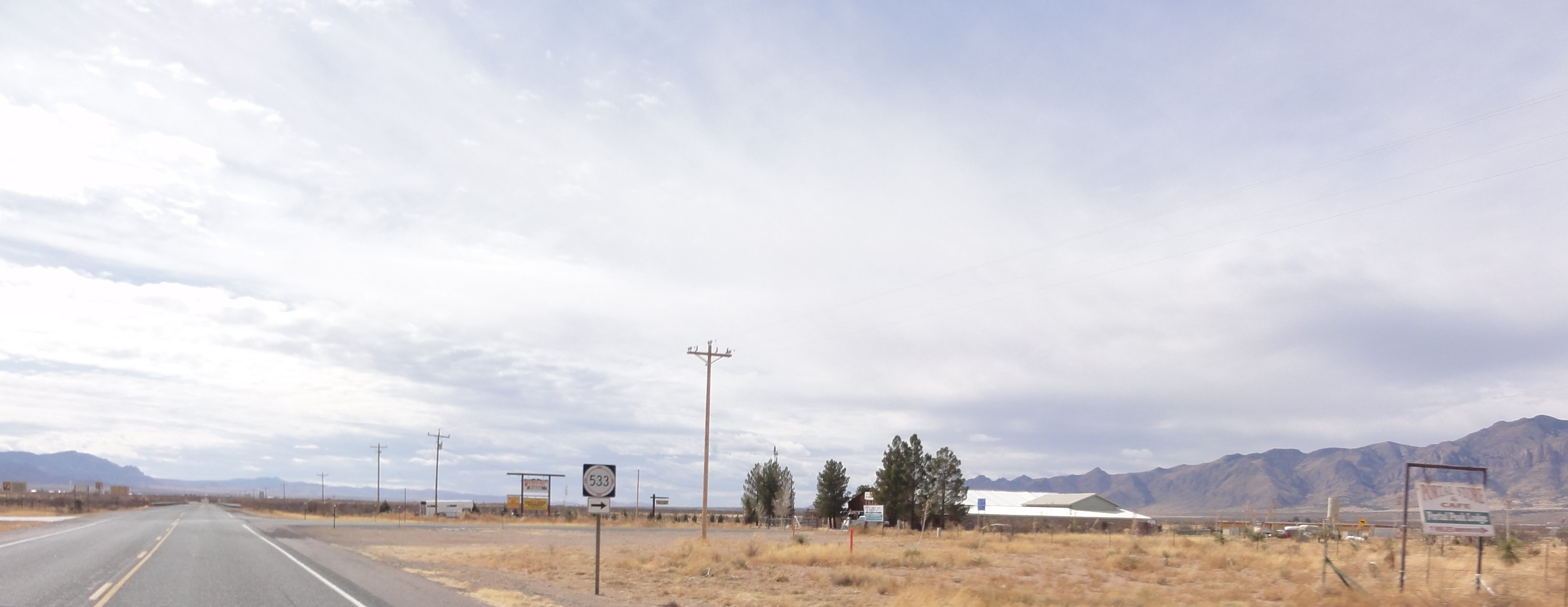
NM 80 approaching its junction with NM 533

State Road 533 (NM 533) is a 0.800-mile-long (1.287 km) state highway in Hidalgo County. The highway begins at the Arizona state line on Portal Road, east to an intersection with NM 80.

Browse numbered routes
← NM 532	→ NM 536

== State Road 546 ==
State Road 546
- Location: Derry
- Length: 0.660 mi (1,062 m)

State Road 546 (NM 546) is a 0.660-mile-long (1.062 km) state highway in Sierra County. The highway begins at a four way intersection in southeast Derry. The highway begins at NM 187 and travels northeast to an intersection with exit 51 on Interstate 25.

Browse numbered routes
← NM 545	→ NM 549

== State Road 576 ==
State Road 576
- Location: Vallecitos
- Length: 0.500 mi (805 m)
- Existed: June 23, 1988–

State Road 576 (NM 576) is a 0.500-mile-long (0.805 km) state highway in Rio Arriba County. The highway begins at an intersection with NM 111 and travels west to the national forest boundary.

Browse numbered routes
← NM 575	→ NM 578

== State Road 581 ==
State Road 581
- Location: Rio Arriba County
- Length: 0.812 mi (1,307 m)

State Road 581 (NM 581) is a 0.752-mile-long (1.210 km) state highway in Rio Arriba County. The highway begins at an intersection with NM 369 and travels southeasterly to its eastern terminus at NM 399.

Browse numbered routes
← NM 580	→ NM 583

== State Road 597 ==
State Road 597
- Location: Four Corners Monument
- Length: 0.447 mi (719 m)

State Road 597 (NM 597) is a 0.447-mile-long (0.719 km) state highway in San Juan County. The highway begins at an intersection with U.S. Route 160 in the south, and heads northwest to the Four Corners Monument.

Browse numbered routes
← NM 595	→ NM 598

== State Road 615 ==
State Road 615
- Location: Milan
- Length: 0.468 mi (753 m)

State Road 615 (NM 615) is a 0.468-mile-long (0.753 km) state highway in Cibola County. The highway begins at Victor Avenue, and proceeds northwesterly through an interchange with Interstate 40 to the highways eastern terminus at NM 122.

Browse numbered routes
← NM 612	→ NM 1113

== State Road 2001 ==
State Road 2001
- Location: Alamogordo
- Length: 0.3 mi (480 m)
- Existed: yes

State Road 2001 (NM 2001) was a 0.3-mile-long (0.48 km) state highway in Alamogordo. The highway began at Scenic Drive and ended at the New Mexico Museum of Space History. NM 2001 was one of the few "orphan" routes in the State Road system, as it did not connect to any other State Road. The number appears to be a reference to the novel 2001: A Space Odyssey by Arthur C. Clarke. The exact dates of existence are unknown, but the highway was established in the 1990s and the signage remained present as of 2008. The only hints to NM 2001 being retired is the absence of the route from current NMDOT highway logs. The official website for the Space Museum still lists its address at "Highway 2001".

Browse numbered routes
← NM 1113	→ NM 5001

== See also ==
- List of longest state highways in the United States
