= List of churches in the Archdiocese of Santa Fe =

List of churches

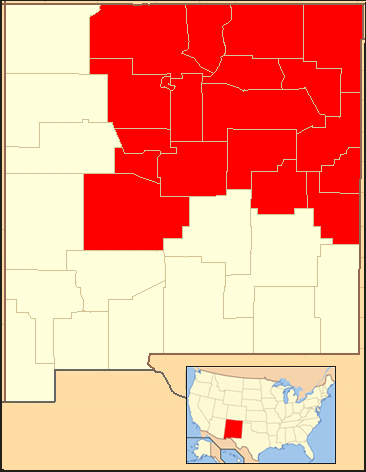
Archdiocese of Santa Fe in red

This is a list of active Catholic parishes and mission churches in the Archdiocese of Santa Fe. This article also includes lists of historic former mission churches and other Catholic communities.

The archdiocese includes 93 parishes and 226 missions. It covers 19 counties in central and northeastern New Mexico, including the cities of Albuquerque and Santa Fe. The archdiocese is divided into eight deaneries.

The cathedral church of the diocese is the Cathedral Basilica of Saint Francis of Assisi in Santa Fe.

== Santa Fe Deanery ==
This is a list of active parishes in Santa Fe and other communities.

Name	Image	Location	Description/notes
Cathedral Basilica of St. Francis of Assisi		131 Cathedral Pl, Santa Fe	Built between 1869 and 1887; constructed around the old adobe church
Cristo Rey		1107 Cristo Rey St, Santa Fe	Adobe church built between 1939 and 1940, designed by architect John Gaw Meem; features a retablo from 1760
Our Lady of Guadalupe		816 Highway 22, Peña Blanca	Established in 1885
Shrine of Our Lady of Guadalupe		417 Agua Fría St, Santa Fe	The oldest church in the United States dedicated to Our Lady of Guadalupe. Constructed between 1776 and 1795
St. Anne		511 Alicia St, Santa Fe	Established in 1942
St. Anthony of Padua		#11 St. Anthony's Loop, Pecos	Established in 1862
St. John the Baptist		1301 Osage Ave, Santa Fe	Established in 1953
St. Joseph		St. Joseph Church, 7 First St, Cerrillos	Founded in 1939, church dedicated in 1922.
		Iglesia Nuestra Señora de los Remedios Mission Church, 920-998 Cam, Galisteo	First church built in 1606, second church in 1706 and current church in 1884. Merged with St. Joseph Parish in 1957
San Isidro		3552 Agua Fría St, Santa Fe	Established in 1975
Santa Maria de la Paz		11 College Ave, Santa Fe	Established in 1990

== Albuquerque A Deanery ==
This list contains active parishes and missions in Albuquerque, Rio Rancho and other communities.

Name	Image	Location	Description/notes
Church of the Incarnation		2300 Monterrey Rd. NE, Rio Rancho	Established in 2003, church dedicated in 2011
Nativity of the Blessed Virgin Mary		9502 Fourth St. NW, Albuquerque	Founded in 1734, current church dedicated in 1907
Our Lady of the Assumption		17350 NM-4, Jemez Springs	Founded by Franciscans in 1906, church dedicated that same year
Our Lady of Guadalupe		1860 Griegos Rd. NW, Albuquerque	Established in 1950
Our Lady of Sorrows		301 S Camino del Pueblo, Bernalillo	Church built in 1857; one of the few Gothic style churches in New Mexico built from adobe
Shrine of the Little Flower, St. Therese of the Infant Jesus		3424 4th St. NW, Albuquerque	Established in 1947
St. John Vianney		1001 Meteor Ave. NE, Rio Rancho	Established in 1997
St. Joseph on the Rio Grande		5901 St. Joseph's Dr. NW, Albuquerque	Established in 1986
St. Jude Thaddeus		5712 Paradise Blvd. NW, Albuquerque	Established in 1968, church dedicated in 2011
St. Thomas Aquinas		1502 Sara Rd. SE, Rio Rancho	Established in 1970
San Diego Mission		475 Mission Rd, Jemez Pueblo	Established in 1905
		Our Lady of Guadalupe Mission church, Cañon	Supervised by San Diego Mission Parish
San Ysidro		5015 Corrales Rd, Corrales	Established as mission church in 1750, second church built in 1869, current church dedicated in 1962, founded as parish in 1966

== Albuquerque B Deanery ==
This list contains active parishes in Albuquerque and other communities.

Name	Image	Location	Description/notes
Estancia Valley Catholic Parish		215 Girard Ave, Moriarty	Established in 1972. Parish supervises mission churches in Estancia, Tajique, Moriarty and Edgewood
Holy Child		19 Camino de Santo Nino, Tijeras	Established in 1962, church dedicated in 1971
Holy Ghost		927 Arizona St. SE, Albuquerque	Established in 1957
Our Lady of the Annunciation		2621 Vermont St. NE, Albuquerque	Established in 1959, church dedicated in 1989
Our Lady of the Assumption		811 Guaymas Pl. NE, Albuquerque	Established in 1954, church dedicated in 1985
Our Lady of Fatima		4020 Lomas Blvd. NE, Albuquerque	Established as a mission church in 1948; current church dedicated in 1958. Church has relics of six saints
Our Lady of Lavang		1015 Chelwood Park NE, Albuquerque	Established in 1983 for Vietnamese immigrants, church dedicated in 1987
Prince of Peace		12500 Carmel Ave. NE, Albuquerque	Established in 2000
Queen of Heaven		5300 Claremont Ave. NE, Albuquerque	Established in 1952, church dedicate in 1968
Risen Savior Catholic Community		7701 Wyoming Blvd. NE, Albuquerque	Established in 1979, church dedicated in 1978
Shrine of St. Bernadette		11401 Indian School Rd. NE, Albuquerque	Established in 1959, church dedicated in 2002. Declared a shrine in 2003
St. Charles Borromeo		1818 Coal Place SE, Albuquerque	Established in 1934
St. John XXIII		4831 Tramway Ridge Dr. NE, Albuquerque	Established in 1984
St. Thomas Aquinas		1815 Las Lomas Rd. NE, Albuquerque	Established in 1954; serves the University of New Mexico
Sangre de Cristo		8901 Candelaria Rd. NE, Albuquerque	Established in 1972

== Albuquerque C Deanery ==
This list contains active parishes in Albuquerque and Isleta Pueblo.

Name	Image	Location	Description/notes
Church of the Ascension		2150 Raymac Rd. SW, Albuquerque	Established in 1965
Holy Family		562 Atrisco Dr. SW, Albuquerque	Established in 1953
Immaculate Conception		619 Copper Ave. NW, Albuquerque	Founded by Jesuits in 1882. Church dedicated in 1960
Our Lady of the Most Holy Rosary		5415 Fortuna Rd. NW, Albuquerque	Established in 1960
Sacred Heart		309 Stover Ave. SW, Albuquerque	Established in 1903
St. Anne		1400 Arenal Rd. SW, Albuquerque	Established in 1942
St. Edwin		2105 Barcelona Rds SW, Albuquerque	Established 1965
St. Francis Xavier		820 Broadway Blvds SE, Albuquerque	Established in 1928; current church built in 1949
San Felipe de Neri		2005 North Plaza NW, Albuquerque	Original church built between 1706 and 1719. Current church built in 1793
San Ignacio		1300 Walter St. NE, Albuquerque	Founded in 1916
San Jose		2401 Broadway Blvd. SE, Albuquerque	Established in 1947
San Martin de Porres		8301 Camino San Martin SW, Albuquerque	Established in 1979

== Northeast Deanery ==
This list contains active parishes and missions in Las Vegas and other communities.

Name	Image	Location	Description/notes
Holy Family - St. Joseph		355 Chicosa St, Roy	Established in 1974; supervises four mission churches
Immaculate Conception		440 W 18th St, Cimarron	Established in 1872, supervises four mission churches
		Holy Angels Mission Church, 34 W. Ridge Rd, Angel Fire	Supervised by Immaculate Conception Parish
		St. Mel Mission Church, 200 Willow Creek Dr, Eagle Nest	Supervised by Immaculate Conception Parish
		San Antonio Mission Church, San Antonio Church Rd., Black Lake	Supervised by Immaculate Conception Parish
Immaculate Conception		811 Sixth St, Las Vegas	Established in 1885. Supervises two mission churches and; the Newman Center at New Mexico Highlands University
St. Francis Xavier		115 N 1st St, Clayton	Established in 1937
Our Lady of Guadalupe		4 Our Lady of Guadalupe, Villanueva	Established in 1920; supervises five mission churches
Our Lady of Sorrows		403 Valencia St, Las Vegas	Established in 1852. Supervises 16 mission churches
St. Gertrude the Great		#12 County Rd A-033, Mora	Established in 1856; supervises 16 mission churches
		Nuestra Señora de Guadalupe Mission Church, NM-434, Guadalupita	Supervised by St. Gertrude the Great Parish
		San Antonio de Padua Mission Church, NM State Hwy 518, Cleveland	Supervised by St. Gertrude the Great Parish
St. Joseph		605 5th St, Springer	Established in 1822; supervises two mission churches
St. Patrick-St. Joseph		105 Buena Vista St, Raton	Established in 1988
San Miguel del Vado		Highway 3, Ribera	Established in the late 1820s; supervises seven mission churches
Santa Clara		805 Calhoun Ave, Wagon Mound	Established in 1920; supervises four mission churches

== Northwest Deanery ==
This list contains active parishes and missions in Taos and other communities.

Name	Image	Location	Description/notes
Holy Cross		126 McCurdy Rd (SR 583), Santa Cruz	Established in 1695; supervises five mission churches
Holy Family		#10, Route 76, Chimayo	Established in 1959. Supervises seven mission churches
		Santo Rosario Mission Church, Truchas	Supervised by Holy Family Parish
Immaculate Heart of Mary		3700 Canyon Rd, Los Alamos	Established in 1946; supervises one mission church
Nuestra Senora de Guadalupe del Valle de Pojoaque		9 Grazing Elk Dr, Pojoaque	Established in 1959; supervises three mission churches
		San Antonio de Padua Mission Church, 14047 Henze Rd, El Rancho	Supervised by Nuestra Senora de Guadalupe Parish
Sacred Heart		908 Calle Rosario, Española	Established in 1950; supervises four mission churches
St. Anthony		SR 75 Private Dr. 1114, Dixon	Established in 1934; supervises three mission churches
St. Patrick		352 Pine Ave, Chama	Established in 1964; supervises two mission churches
St. Thomas the Apostle		#1 Church Plaza, Abiquiu	Established in1946; supervises seven mission churches
		Nuestra Señora de Guadalupe Mission Church, NM State Hwy 96, Gallina	Supervised by St. Thomas the Apostle Parish
		San Miguel Mission Church, County Road 194, Cañones	Supervised by St. Thomas the Apostle Parish
		San Juan Bautista Mission Church, 54 Rio Arriba County Road 212, Coyote	Supervised by St. Thomas the Apostle Parish
San Jose		101 Main St, Los Ojos	Established in 1887; supervises three mission churches
San Juan Nepomuceno		Main St, El Rito	Original church built between 1827 and 1832; reconstructed in 1982 after a major structural collapse
		La Inmaculada Concepcion Mission, Tres Piedras	Supervised by San Juan Nepomuceno Parish
La Santisima Trinidad		498 Hwy 150, Arroyo Seco	Established in 1946; supervises four mission churches
		Nuestra Señora de Dolores Mission Church, Arroyo Hondo	Supervised by La Santisima Trinidad Parish
		San Cristobal Mission Church, Camino Del Medio, San Cristobal	Supervised by La Santisima Trinidad Parish
San Juan Bautista & Tewa Missions		185 Popaye Ave, Ohkay Owingeh	Established in 1598; supervises 10 mission churches
		Shrine of Our Lady of Lourdes, 237 Ohkay Bupingeh, Ohkay Owingeh	Supervised by San Juan Bautista Parish
San Antonio de Padua		14079 N Hwy 75, Peñasco	Established in 1866; supervises seven mission churches
		Nuestra Señora de los Dolores Mission Church, New Mexico State Road 75, Vadito	Supervised by San Antonio de Padua Parish
St. Anthony		10 Church Plaza, Questa	Established in 1941; supervises four mission churches
		Nuestra Senora de Guadalupe Mission Church, New Mexico State Road 378, Cerro	Supervised by St. Anthony Parish
		Sacred Heart Mission Church, 16 Garcia Rd, Costilla	Supervised by St. Anthony Parish
		St. Edwin Mission Church, 301 Silver Bell Trl, Red River	Supervised by St. Anthony Parish
		Santo Niño Mission Church, 3760 Sandhill Dr, Amalia	Supervised by St. Anthony Parish
San Francisco de Asís Mission		St. Francis Plaza #60, Ranchos de Taos	Established in 1937; supervises three mission churches
		Nuestra Señora de San Juan de Los Lagos Mission, Nuestra Senora de San Juan Rd., Talpa	Supervised by San Francisco de Asís Parish
Taos Valley Parishes and Missions		Our Lady of Guadalupe, 205 Don Fernando St, Taos	Established in 1833; supervises five mission churches
		San Geronimo Mission Church, Taos	Ruins of the church destroyed 1846 are part of the Taos Pueblo UNESCO World Heritage Site. Current church completed in 1885. Supervised by Our Lady of Guadalupe Parish
Santo Niño		Rio Arriba CR 15, Bldg 23, Tierra Amarilla	Established in 1966

== Southeast Deanery ==
This list contains churches in Clovis, Tucumcari and other communities.

Name	Image	Location	Description/notes
Our Lady of Guadalupe		108 N. Davis St, Clovis	Established in 1945
Sacred Heart		921 N. Merriwether St, Clovis	Established in 1906
St. Anne		306 W. High St, Tucumcari	Established in 1910
San Antonio Mission Church		907 Armijo St., Logan, NM 88426	
St. Anthony of Padua		443 Richard Ave, Fort Sumner	Established in 1958
St. Helen		1600 S. Ave O, Portales	Established in 1952
St. Mary		376 W. 8th St, Vaughn	Established in 1936
St. Rose of Lima		439 S. 3rd St, Santa Rosa	Established in 1917
San Jose		1081 Iglesia Rd, Anton Chico	Established in 1857; Pat Garrett was wed at the church

== Southwest Deanery ==
Name	Image	Location	Description/notes
Immaculate Conception		7 Church Loop, Tome	Established in 1821
Our Lady of Belen		101-A N. 10th St, Belen	Established in 1793
Our Lady of Sorrows		1900 Calle de La Iglesia, La Joya	Established in 1881
St. Alice		301 S. Roosevelt Ave, Mountainair	Established in 1946. Supervises five mission churches
Our Lady of Guadalupe		3674 Highway 47, Peralta	Established in 1871. Supervises mission church in Valencia
San Clemente		255 Luna Rd. NE, Los Lunas	Established in 1961
San Miguel		403 El Camino Real St. NW, Socorro	Established 1821. Supervises eight mission churches and the Newman Center at New Mexico Tech
		Sagrada Familia de Lemitar Mission Church, Lemitar	Listed on NRHP; supervised by San Miguel Parish

== Other Catholic communities ==
Name	Image	Location	Description/notes
Santa Maria de la Vid Abbey		5825 Coors Blvd. SW, Albuquerque	Part of the Norbertine community
Our Lady Queen of Peace		1420 San Pedro Dr. NE, Albuquerque	Uses Tridentine Mass, not associated with the archdiocese

== Historic former missions ==
Name	Image	Location	Description/notes
Gran Quivira, or San Buenaventura de Las Humanas Mission		102 S Ripley, Mountainair (Visitor Center)	Part of Salinas Pueblo Missions National Monument
Loretto Chapel		207 Old Santa Fe Tl, Santa Fe	Gothic style chapel, built by the Sisters of Loretto around 1873; known for its circular staircase. Now privately owned
Mission Nuestra Señora de la Asunción		Zia Pueblo	Supervised by the National Park Service
Nuestra Señora de Los Angeles de Porciúncula de los Pecos Mission		Pecos National Historical Park, Pecos	Ruins of the 1787 church, supervised by National Park Service
San Agustín de la Isleta Mission		TR 35, #71, Isleta Pueblo	Established in 1613. Supervised by National Park Service
San Buenaventura de Cochiti Mission		2-40 Bald Eagle Rd, Cochiti	Mission in Pueblo de Cochiti
El Santuario de Chimayo.		15 Santuario Dr, Chimayo	
San Isidro Mission		3688 Agua Fría St, Santa Fe	Built in 1835 as a mission of the St. Francis Cathedral
San Ildefonso Mission Church		San Ildefonso Pueblo	Restored church dedicated 1968
San José de los Jémez Mission		Jemez Historic Site	U.S. National Historic Landmark
San Lorenzo de Picuris Mission		Picuris Pueblo	Part of the old pueblo listed on the NRHP
San Miguel Mission		401 Old Santa Fe Trl, Santa Fe	The oldest Catholic church in the continental United States. First built between 1610 and 1626; rebuilt in 1710; part of the Barrio De Analco Historic District, a National Historic Landmark
Santa Clara Mission		Santa Clara Pueblo	Originally built in 1758
