= New Mexico State Road 96 =

State highway in Sandoval and Rio Arriba counties in New Mexico, United States

State Road 96

Route information
- Maintained by NMDOT
- Length: 48.989 mi (78.840 km)

Major junctions
- West end: US 550 north of Cuba
- NM 112 north of Regina
- East end: US 84 east of Abiquiu Reservoir

Location
- Country: United States
- State: New Mexico
- Counties: Sandoval, Rio Arriba

Highway system
- New Mexico State Highway System; Interstate; US; State; Scenic
← NM 95	→ NM 97

State Road 96 (NM 96) is a 48.989-mile (78.840 km) state highway in Sandoval and Rio Arriba counties in New Mexico, United States, that connects U.S. Route 550 (US 550), northwest of Cuba, with U.S. Route 84 (US 84), east of the Abiquiu Reservoir.

== Route description ==
NM 96 begins at a T intersection with US 550 just south of the census-designated place (CDP) of La Jara. (Eastbound US 550 heads south toward the city of Cuba. Westbound US 550 heads north toward the cities of Bloomfield and Farmington.) From its western terminus, NM 95 proceeds north for roughly 8 miles (13 km) to pass through La Jara and reach Old Highway 95 at a T intersection on the southern edge of the CDP of Regina. (Old Highway 95, which was the former routing of New Mexico State Road 95, heads northerly along the western edge of Regina to connect with New Mexico State Road 595 [NM 595] and then on toward Lindrith).

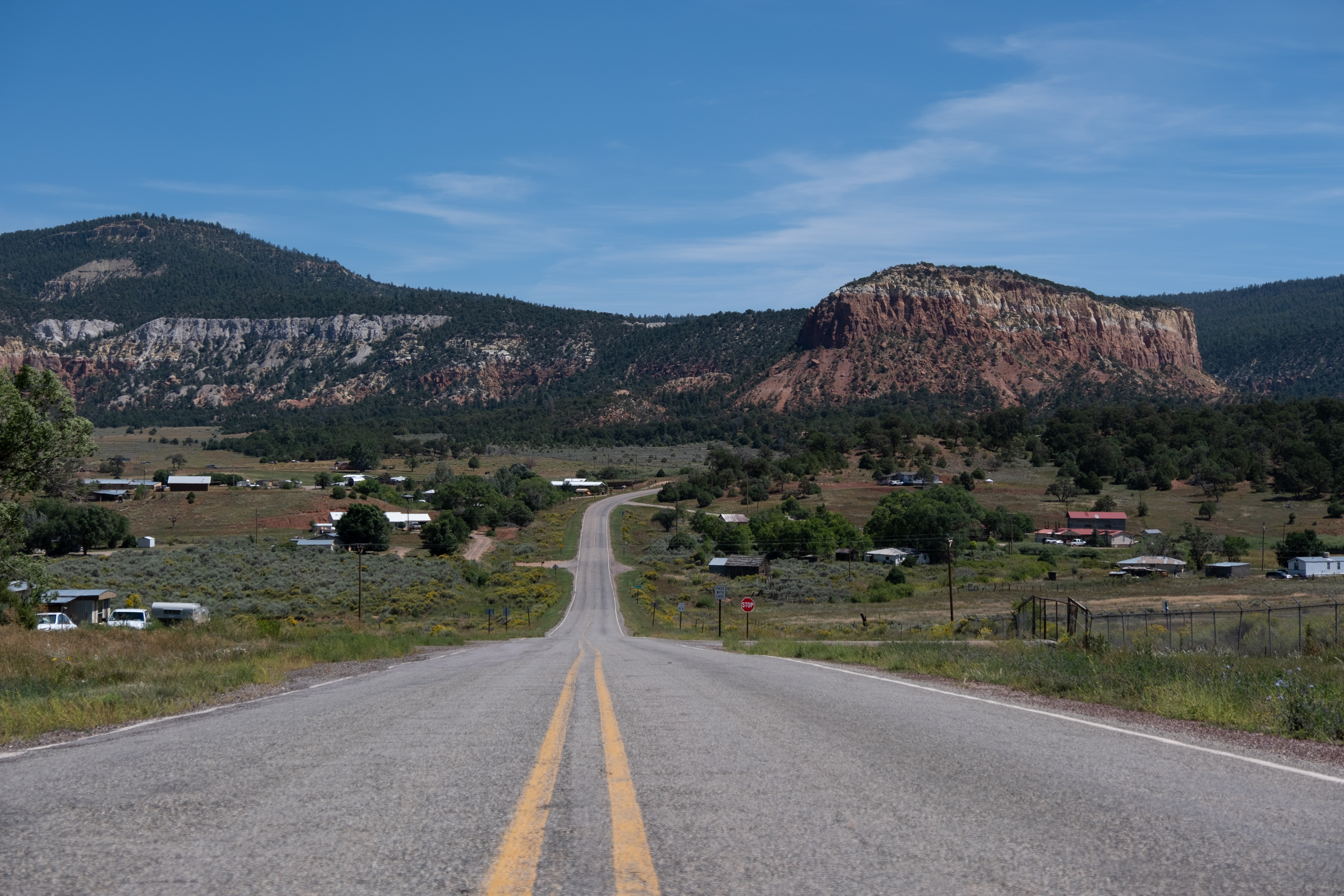
Easbound NM 96 in Gallina, September 2024

Just north of Regina, NM 96 connects with the west end of NM 595 at T intersection. (NM 595 heads west to connect with the north end of Old Highway 95 and then curves to head northerly toward Lindrith. Beyond Old Highway 595, NM 595 follows the former routing of NM 95.) Almost exactly one mile (1.6 km) north of the NM 595 junction, NM 96 reaches the south end of New Mexico State Road 112 (NM 112) at T intersection. (NM 112 heads northerly toward El Vado and Tierra Amarilla.)

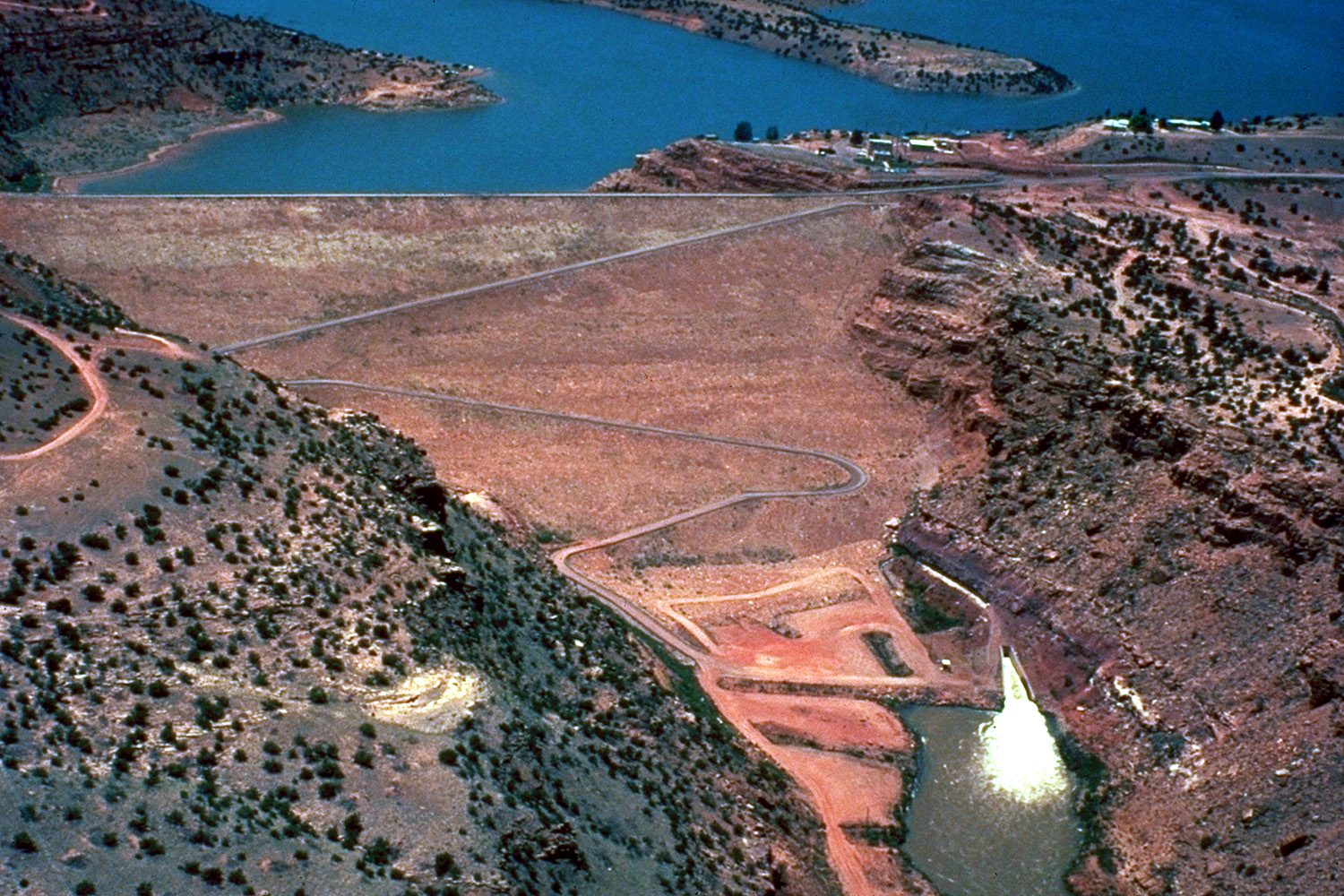
NM 96 crossing of the Abiquiu Dam

From its junction with NM 112, NM 95 proceeds easterly for approximately 34 miles (55 km) to pass through the CDP of Gallina, the unincorporated community of Arroyo Del Agua, and the CDPs of Coyote and Youngsville before reaching the southern edge of the Abiquiu Reservoir. As it curves around the south end of the reservoir NM 96 crosses the Rio Chama on the Abiquiu Dam, before continuing northeasterly to reach US 84 at its eastern terminus at a T intersection. (Eastbound US 84 heads easterly toward Española and Santa Fe. Westbound US 84 heads northerly toward Chama.)

== Major intersections ==
County	Location	mi	km	Destinations	Notes
Sandoval		0.000	0.000	US 550 east – Cuba, Bernalillo US 550 west – Bloomfield, Farmington	Western terminus; T intersection
Rio Arriba	Regina			Old Hwy 95 north – NM 595, Lindrith	Former routing of NM 95
Rio Arriba		11.936	19.209	NM 595 north – Lindrith	Southern end of NM 595; T intersection
Rio Arriba		12.934	20.815	NM 112 north – El Vado, Tierra Amarilla	Southern end of NM 112; T intersection
Rio Arriba				Abiquiu Dam on the Rio Chama	
Rio Arriba		48.989	78.840	US 84 east – Española, Santa Fe US 84 west – Chama	Eastern terminus; T intersection
1.000 mi = 1.609 km; 1.000 km = 0.621 mi

== See also ==
- List of state roads in New Mexico
