= Cerro Pedernal =

Mesa in Rio Arriba County, New Mexico, US

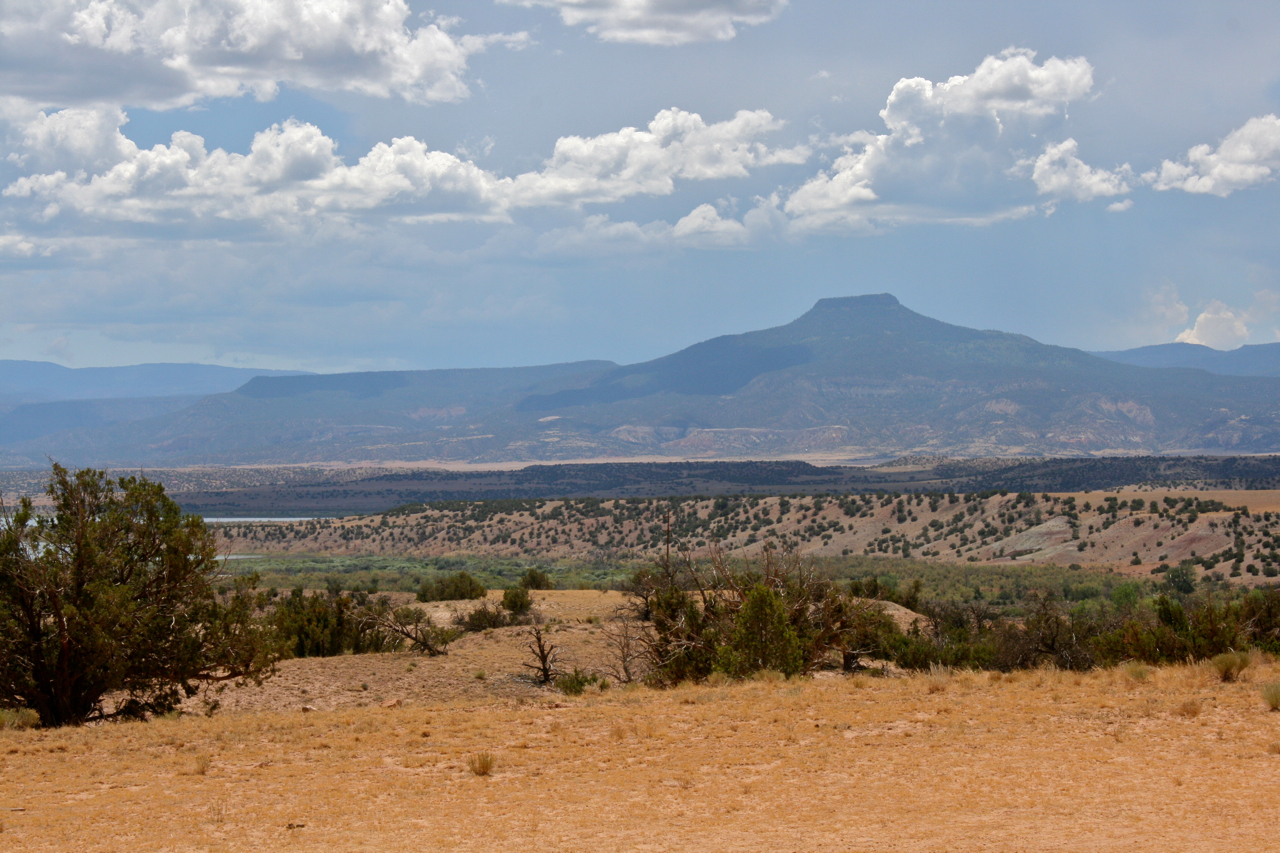
- Pedernal viewed from Ghost Ranch

Highest point
- Elevation: 9,866 ft (3,007 m) NAVD 88
- Prominence: 1,362 ft (415 m)
- Coordinates: 36°09′48″N 106°30′14″W

Geography
- Location within New Mexico
- Location: Rio Arriba County, New Mexico, U.S.
- Parent range: Jemez Mountains
- Topo map: USGS Youngsville

Cerro Pedernal, (Tewa: Tsee Pʼin, pronounced [tsìː pʼìŋ], lit. 'obsidian mountain') locally known as just "Pedernal", is a narrow mesa in Rio Arriba County, in northern New Mexico. The name is Spanish for "flint hill". The basalt-capped peak lies on the north flank of the Jemez Mountains, south of Abiquiu Lake, in the Coyote Ranger District of the Santa Fe National Forest, near the boundary between the Colorado Plateau and the Abiquiu embayment of the Rio Grande Rift. Its highest point is at 9,866 feet (3,007 m).

Pedernal is the source of a chert used by the prehistoric Gallina people. Its cliffs are popular with rock climbers. Georgia O'Keeffe made many paintings of it, and her ashes were scattered on its top.

The Tewa name of the mountain is Tsee Pʼin (tsee, 'obsidian' + pʼin 'mountain'). The Cochiti name is Hésrt'e'yanyik'óthe (hésrt'e'yanyi 'obsidian' + k'óthe 'mountain').

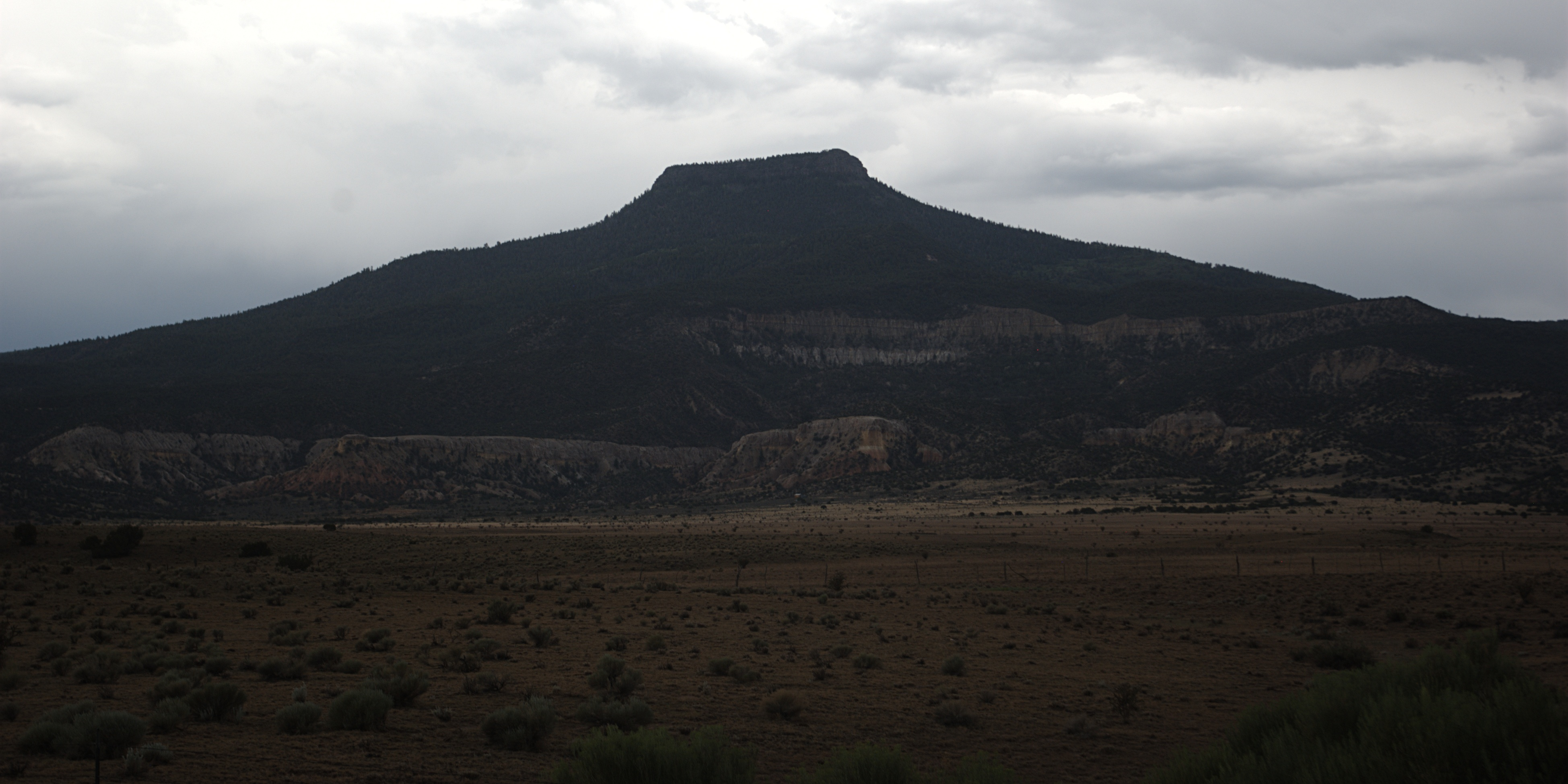
From Youngsville, New Mexico, in summer monsoon weather

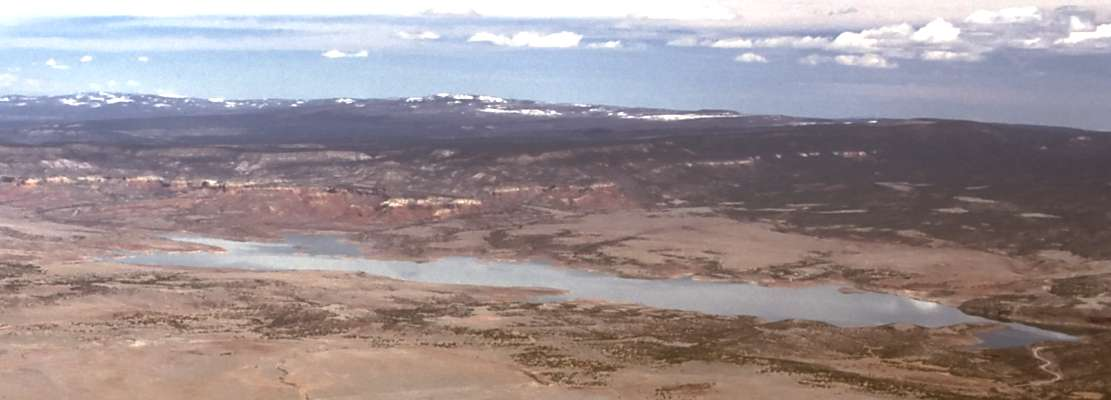
View from summit in winter, looking north – Abiquiu Lake in foreground; Tusas Mountains on horizon
