= Llaves, New Mexico =

Unincorporated community in Rio Arriba County, New Mexico, United States

- Unincorporated community
- Location within New Mexico
- Coordinates: 36°22′22″N 106°52′00″W
- Country: United States
- State: New Mexico
- County: Rio Arriba
- Elevation: 7,074 ft (2,156 m)
- Time zone: UTC-7 (Mountain (MST))
  - Summer (DST): UTC-6 (MDT)
- ZIP Code: 87029
- Area code: 575
- GNIS feature ID: 908095

Llaves is an unincorporated community in Rio Arriba County, New Mexico, United States. It is roughly 14 miles (23 km) north-northwest of Regina.

== Description ==
The community is located along New Mexico State Road 112, which connects Regina with Tierra Amarilla, via the El Vado Dam.

Several archaeological sites that are listed on the National Register of Historical Places (NRHP) are located in or near Llaves, including the Archeological Site No. AR-03-10-02-357, Castles of the Chama (AR-03-10-01-216), Nogales Cliff House (AR-03-10-02-124), and Rattlesnake Ridge Site. However, due to the sensitive nature of these sites, their exact location is "Address restricted" by the National Park Service. The Castles of the Chama and the Nogales Cliff House are also listed on New Mexico's State Register of Cultural Properties (SRCP).

== See also ==
- National Register of Historic Places listings in Rio Arriba County, New Mexico
