= El Vado, New Mexico =

Unincorporated community in Rio Arriba County, New Mexico, United States

- Unincorporated community
- Location within New Mexico Location within the United States
- Coordinates: 36°35′38″N 106°43′43″W
- Country: United States
- State: New Mexico
- County: Rio Arriba
- Elevation: 6,854 ft (2,089 m)
- Time zone: UTC-7 (Mountain (MST))
  - Summer (DST): UTC-8 (MDT)
- ZIP Code: 87575
- Area code: 575
- FIPS code: 35-24260
- GNIS ID: 923596

El Vado is an unincorporated community along the Rio Chama on the south ends of the El Vado Reservoir and the El Vado Lake State Park in Rio Arriba County, New Mexico, United States. It is roughly 56 miles (90 km) northwest of Española and about 28 miles (45 km) south of the Colorado–New Mexico border.

== Geography ==
The community is located along New Mexico State Road 112 (NM 112), which connects New Mexico State Road 96 (north-northeast of Regina) with U.S. Route 64 / U.S. Route 84 in New Mexico in Los Ojos. The El Vado Dam, which creates the El Vado Reservoir, is located within the community and NM 112 passes over the dam.
