= New Mexico State Road 584 =

State highway in Española, New Mexico, United States

State Road 584
- Fairview Lane
- NM 584 highlighted in red

Route information
- Maintained by NMDOT
- Length: 1.277 mi (2.055 km)

Major junctions
- West end: US 84 / US 285 in Española
- East end: NM 68 / NM 583 in Española

Location
- Country: United States
- State: New Mexico
- Counties: Rio Arriba

Highway system
- New Mexico State Highway System; Interstate; US; State; Scenic
← NM 583	→ NM 585

State Road 584 (NM 584), also known as Fairview Lane, is a 1.277-mile (2.055 km) east–west state highway in northern Española, New Mexico, United States, that connects U.S. Route 84/U.S. Route 285 (US 84/US 285) with New Mexico State Road 68 (NM 68).

== Route description ==
NM 584 begins at a signal-controlled intersection with US 84/US 285 (North Paseo De Ontate) in northwestern Española. (From the intersection Industrial Park Road heads west to the westernmost part of the city. US 84/US 285 heads northerly toward Tierra Amarilla and Chama and southerly to connect with NM 68, then on toward El Valle de Arroyo Seco, Pojoaque and Santa Fe.) From its western terminus NM 584 heads east along Fairview Lane, initially as a five-lane road, to connect with the south end of North Prince Drive after about 0.1 miles (0.16 km). Roughly 0.3 miles (0.48 km) farther east, NM 584 connects with North Railroad Avenue (which heads south to end at US 84/US 285) and promptly narrows to a two-lane road. Approximately 0.4 miles (0.64 km) beyond that intersection, NM 584 crosses the Rio Grande. About 0.2 miles (0.32 km) later, NM 584 connects with the west end of Riley Road (which heads northeasterly to end at NM 68) and then gains an eastbound lane. After roughly 0.2 miles (0.32 km) more, NM 584, reaches its eastern terminus at signal-controlled intersection with NM 68 (North Riverside Drive) in the Fairview neighborhood of Española. (From the intersection East Fairview Lane continues east to end at New Mexico State Road 291. NM 68 heads north toward Velarde, Embudo, and Taos and south to end US 84/US 285, which continues southerly toward El Valle de Arroyo Seco, Pojoaque, and Santa Fe.)

== Traffic ==
Annual average daily traffic history (Note: Annual average daily traffic history reflects the highest reported traffic for all sections of the highway. The section with highest reported traffic may vary from year to year and may be affected by additions to and deletions from the highway, as well as highway realignments.)

Annual average daily traffic
Year	AADT
2020	
2019	
2018	
2017	
2016	
2015	16,955
2014	14,717
2013	14,606

The New Mexico Department of Transportation (NMDOT) collects data for the State Roads and Local Federal-Aid roads. Traffic is measured in both directions and reported as Annual Average Daily Traffic (AADT). As of 2015, NM 584 had an AADT of 16,955, with a nearly 14 percent increase in traffic over the previous two years.

== Major intersections ==
The entire route is in Española, Rio Arriba County.

mi	km	Destinations	Notes
0.000	0.000	Industrial Park Road west	Continuation west beyond western terminus
0.000	0.000	US 84 east / US 285 south (North Paseo De Ontate) – NM 68, El Valle de Arroyo Seco, Pojoaque, Santa Fe US 84 west / US 285 north (North Paseo De Ontate) – Tierra Amarilla, Chama	Western terminus
		Bridge over the Rio Grande	
1.277	2.055	NM 68 north (North Riverside Dr) – Velarde, Embudo, Taos NM 68 south (North Riverside Dr) – US 84 / US 285, El Valle de Arroyo Seco, Pojoaque, Santa Fe	Eastern terminus
1.277	2.055	East Fairview Lane east – NM 291	Continuation east beyond eastern terminus
1.000 mi = 1.609 km; 1.000 km = 0.621 mi

== See also ==
- List of state roads in New Mexico
