= New Mexico State Road 399 =

State highway in New Mexico, United States

State Road 399

Route information
- Maintained by NMDOT
- Length: 3.185 mi (5.126 km)

Major junctions
- Southern end: CR 120 / CR 127 in La Mesilla
- Northern end: US 84 / US 285 in Sombrillo

Location
- Country: United States
- State: New Mexico
- Counties: Santa Fe, Rio Arriba

Highway system
- New Mexico State Highway System; Interstate; US; State; Scenic
← NM 398	→ NM 400

State Road 399 (NM 399) is a 3.185-mile-long (5.126 km) state highway in the US state of New Mexico. NM 399's northern terminus is at U.S. Route 84 (US 84) and US 285 in Sombrillo, and the southern terminus is a continuation as County Route 120 (CR 120) at CR 127 in La Mesilla.

== Major intersections ==
County	Location	mi	km	Destinations	Notes
Santa Fe	Sombrillo	0.000	0.000	US 84 / US 285	Northern terminus
Rio Arriba		0.981	1.579	NM 581 west	Eastern terminus of NM 581
Rio Arriba	La Mesilla	3.185	5.126	CR 120 / CR 127	Southern terminus, continues as CR 120 at CR 127
1.000 mi = 1.609 km; 1.000 km = 0.621 mi
