= Cañones, New Mexico =

- Census-designated place
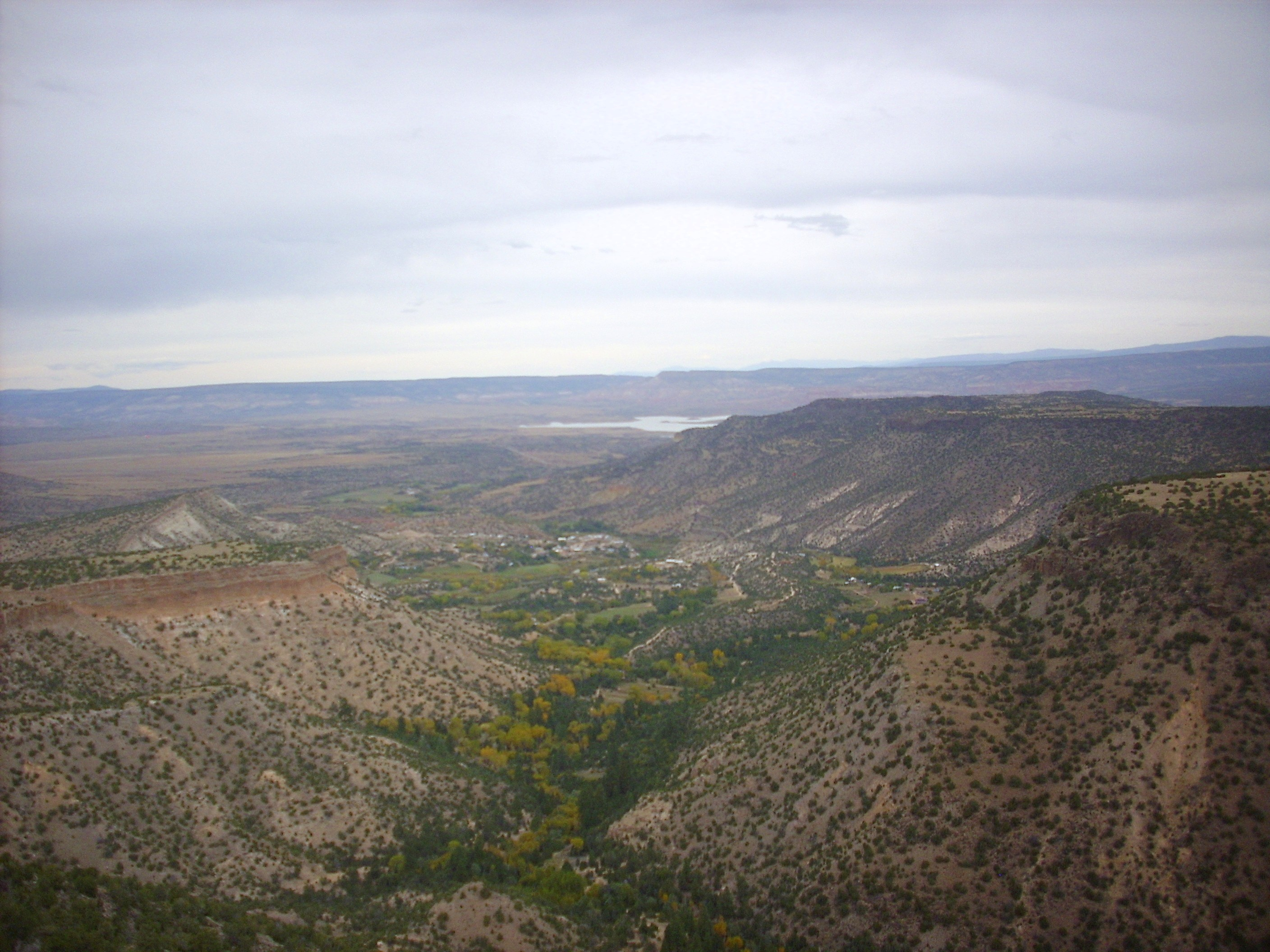
- Cañones seen from Polvadera Mesa

- Location within New Mexico
- Coordinates: 36°10′37″N 106°25′28″W
- Country: United States
- State: New Mexico
- County: Rio Arriba

Area
  - Total: 4.14 sq mi (10.72 km^{2})
  - Land: 4.14 sq mi (10.72 km^{2})
  - Water: 0 sq mi (0.00 km^{2})
- Elevation: 7,356 ft (2,242 m)

Population (2020)
  - Total: 85
  - Density: 20.5/sq mi (7.93/km^{2})
- Time zone: UTC-7 (Mountain (MST))
  - Summer (DST): UTC-6 (MDT)
- ZIP code: 87516
- Area code: 575
- GNIS feature ID: 2584065

Cañones is a census-designated place in Rio Arriba County, New Mexico, United States. As of the 2020 census, Cañones had a population of 85. Cañones had a post office until it closed on January 3, 2002.

== Demographics ==
Historical population
Census	Pop.	Note	%±
2020	85		—
U.S. Decennial Census

The town had 85 people in the 2020 census.

== Description ==
The Tewa ruin of Tsee Pʼin Ówîngeh Kayyee ('Obsidian Mountain pueblo ruin'; also Tsiping or Tsi’pinouinge) is found on Pueblo Mesa just south of Cañones. The settlement was active during the Classic stage, between 1200 CE and 1325 CE, and at its peak the settlement had 335 to 400 ground floor rooms and sixteen kivas surrounding a central plaza. Visitors to the ruins can find the trailhead at the south end of County Rd. 196.

The origins of the community trace back to 1766, when Juan Pablo Martín Serrano was awarded the Polvadera Grant. Serrano was a wealthy military veteran with a large family, and established a seasonal rancho in the canyon, raising livestock, farming the canyon bottom, and trading with the Utes. Permanent settlement seems to have begun with Juan Bautista Valdez, who bought a grant at the present location of Cañones in 1807.

Cañones was visited by anthropologists Paul Kutsche and John R. Van Ness in the 1960s, who considered the community typical of what they called the Rio Arriba subculture of Hispanic New Mexico. They concluded that this subculture was characterized by communal land grants, small economies, campanilismo (community spirit), and a fair degree of social equality.

During the time Kutsche and Van Ness were guests in the community, the state closed the one-room school and ordered the children to attend school in Coyote, which meant busing the students several miles over a very bad road. The parents refused en masse to send their children to school in Coyote, and the subsequent legal battle seems to have revolved around the issue of whether the parents were acting on legitimate concerns for their children's safety or were using the children to pressure the state into building a better road into the community. The parents were fined for truancy, but the community now has an acceptable paved road.

== See also ==
- List of census-designated places in New Mexico
