= New Mexico State Road 595 =

State highway in New Mexico, United States

State Road 595
- NM 595 highlighted in red

Route information
- Maintained by NMDOT
- Length: 25.314 mi (40.739 km)

Major junctions
- South end: NM 96 near Regina
- North end: End of state maintenance near Lindrith

Location
- Country: United States
- State: New Mexico
- Counties: Rio Arriba

Highway system
- New Mexico State Highway System; Interstate; US; State; Scenic
← NM 594	→ NM 597

State Road 595 (NM 595) is a 25.3-mile-long (40.7 km) state highway in the US state of New Mexico. NM 595's southern terminus is at NM 96 north of Regina, and the northern terminus is at the end of state maintenance north of Lindrith.

== Major intersections ==
The entire route is in Rio Arriba County.

Location	mi	km	Destinations	Notes
	0.000	0.000	NM 96	Southern terminus
	25.314	40.739	End of state maintenance	Northern terminus
1.000 mi = 1.609 km; 1.000 km = 0.621 mi
