= Vallecitos, New Mexico =

Unincorporated community in New Mexico, United States

Vallecitos
- Unincorporated community
- Location within the state of New Mexico Vallecitos (the United States)
- Coordinates: 36°29′42″N 106°07′00″W
- Country: United States
- State: New Mexico
- County: Rio Arriba
- Elevation: 7,418 ft (2,261 m)
- Time zone: UTC-7 (Mountain (MST))
  - Summer (DST): UTC-6 (MDT)
- ZIP codes: 87581
- Area code: 575
- GNIS feature ID: 912055

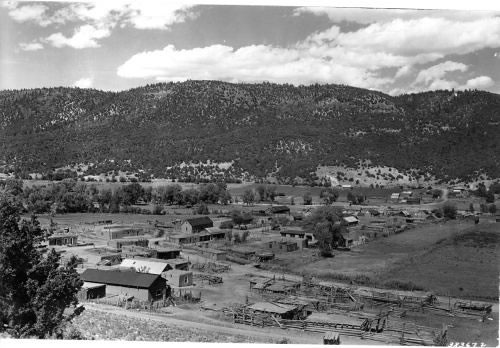
Vallecitos, New Mexico (1939)

Vallecitos (English: "Little Valleys") is an unincorporated community located in Rio Arriba County, New Mexico, United States.

== Description ==
The community is located along New Mexico State Road 576 at the highway's intersection with New Mexico State Road 111, 22.7 miles (36.5 km) north-northeast of Abiquiú, or 14 miles (23 km) north-northwest of Ojo Caliente. Vallecitos has a post office with ZIP code 87581. The Vallecitos zip code had an area of 136.53 sq mi (353.6 km^{2}) and a population of 85, mostly Hispanics, in 2020.
