= New Mexico State Road 583 =

State highway in New Mexico, United States

State Road 583
- NM 583 highlighted in red

Route information
- Maintained by NMDOT
- Length: 2.048 mi (3.296 km)

Major junctions
- South end: NM 76 in Santa Cruz
- North end: NM 68 in Espanola

Location
- Country: United States
- State: New Mexico
- Counties: Santa Fe, Rio Arriba

Highway system
- New Mexico State Highway System; Interstate; US; State; Scenic
← NM 581	→ NM 584

State Road 583 (NM 583) is a 2.048-mile-long (3.296 km) state highway in the US state of New Mexico. NM 583's southern terminus is at NM 76 in Santa Cruz, and the northern terminus is at NM 68 in Espanola.

== Major intersections ==
County	Location	mi	km	Destinations	Notes
Santa Fe	Santa Cruz	0.000	0.000	NM 76	Southern terminus
Santa Fe	Santa Cruz	0.108	0.174	NM 291 north	Southern terminus of NM 291
Rio Arriba	Espanola	2.048	3.296	NM 68	Northern terminus
1.000 mi = 1.609 km; 1.000 km = 0.621 mi
