= Abiquiu Dam =

Dam in Rio Arriba County, New Mexico, United States

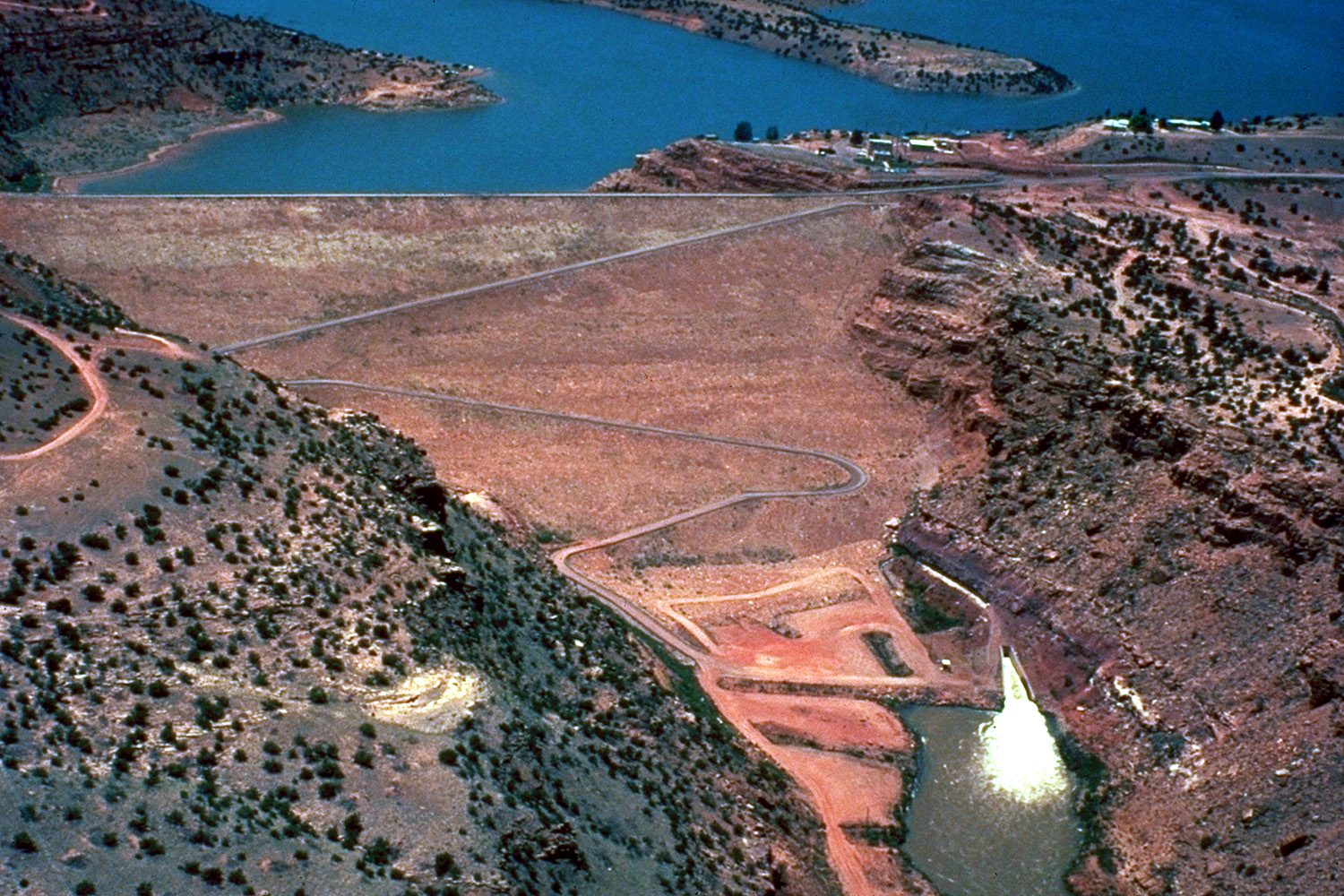
- Interactive map of Abiquiu Dam
- Country: United States
- Location: Rio Arriba County, New Mexico
- Coordinates: 36°14′17″N 106°25′34″W
- Construction began: 1956
- Opening date: 1963

Dam and spillways
- Type of dam: Embankment
- Impounds: Rio Chama
- Height: 354 ft (108 m)
- Length: 1,800 ft (550 m)

Reservoir
- Creates: Abiquiu Lake
- Total capacity: 1,369,000 acre⋅ft (1,689,000 dam^{3})
- Catchment area: 2,146 mi^{2} (5,560 km^{2})

Power Station
- Operator: County of Los Alamos
- Commission date: 1987–1990, 2009–2011
- Turbines: 2x 6.75 MW; 1x 3.0 MW
- Installed capacity: 16.5 MW

Abiquiu Dam is a dam on the Rio Chama, located about 60 miles (97 km) northwest of Santa Fe in Rio Arriba County, New Mexico, United States. It impounds the Rio Chama to form Abiquiu Lake. It is one of the four United States Army Corps of Engineers projects for flood and sediment control on the Rio Grande system, operating in conjunction with Cochiti Dam, Galisteo Dam and Jemez Canyon Dam.

== Description ==
Built and operated by the U.S. Army Corps of Engineers (USACE), the dam is an earth embankment structure 354 feet (108 m) high and 1,800 feet (550 m) long, containing 11.8 million cubic yards (9,022,000 m^{3}) of fill. Abiquiu Lake, one of the largest lakes in New Mexico, has a full storage capacity of 1,369,000 acre-feet (1,689,000 dam^{3}) and 5,200 acres (2,100 ha) of water. To date, the reservoir has never filled to capacity, with a record high of 402,258 acre-feet (496,178 dam^{3}), 29.4% of full pool, on June 22, 1987. The dam's primary purpose is flood control, in addition to irrigation and municipal water storage, and hydroelectric generation.

== History ==
The first proposal for a flood control dam on the Rio Chama was introduced in the Flood Control Act of 1948. The original plans called for the construction of a low dam at Chamita, about 20 miles (32 km) downstream of the present site of Abiquiu Dam. In the 1950s a dam at Abiquiu was added to the project, and it was later determined that a single high dam at this site would be sufficient. In the subsequent Flood Control Act of 1960, the Chamita dam was removed from the project. Construction of Abiquiu Dam began in 1956 and the river was diverted in July 1959. Limited flood control operations began in 1962 and the dam was completed on February 5, 1963, at a cost of $21.2 million.

== Upgrades ==
The dam initially functioned as a dry dam, with a very small permanent reservoir pool for sediment-trapping purposes. In 1974 the city of Albuquerque petitioned the USACE for the regular storage of up to 200,000 acre-feet (250,000 dam^{3}) in the reservoir as part of the San Juan–Chama Project. The USACE agreed in 1976 to allow this storage, also increasing the minimum reservoir volume to 44,400 acre-feet (54,800 dam^{3}) for recreation purposes. In 1986, the dam was raised by 13 feet (4.0 m) and the emergency spillway widened from 40 feet (12 m) to 80 feet (24 m).

== Hydroelectric plant ==
In 1990 a small power station was constructed at the dam base providing a capacity of 13.5 megawatts (MW). Between 2009 and 2011, the addition of a turbine increased the plant's capacity to 16.5 MW. The hydroelectric plant is operated by Los Alamos County Department of Public Utilities.

== See also ==
- List of dams and reservoirs in New Mexico
- List of largest reservoirs in the United States
