= Riverside, Rio Arriba County, New Mexico =

Riverside
- suburb
- Location within the state of New Mexico
- Coordinates: 35°59′42″N 106°03′56″W
- Country: United States
- State: New Mexico
- County: Rio Arriba
- Elevation: 5,598 ft (1,706 m)
- Time zone: UTC-7 (Mountain (MST))
  - Summer (DST): UTC-6 (MDT)
- ZIP codes: 87532
- Geonames Feature code: PPL 5487892

Riverside is a former village, now a suburb of Espanola, in Rio Arriba County, New Mexico, in the southwestern United States. It is located in north-central New Mexico, on the left bank (east side) of the Rio Grande across the river from Española proper. It is on NM Route 68 just north of U.S. Route 285 and just south of the former village of Santa Niño. To the southeast is the former village of San Pedro.

== History ==
As early as 800 A.D. the area was being intensively farmed by the pueblo people. In 1598 when Capitán General Juan de Oñate arrived in northern New Mexico, the area was occupied by the Tewa pueblo people of Ohkay Owingeh (San Juan Pueblo). The Riverside lands remained as irrigated farm lands while over the next 300 years ownership became intermingled between puebloans and others until The Pueblo Lands Act of 1924, when a decision of the Lands Board set, or identified, the present southern border of San Juan Pueblo just north of Santa Niño.

In 1941, the Oñate Bridge was built across the Rio Grande connecting Española and Riverside, which afterwards was annexed by Española.
