= Coyote, Lincoln County, New Mexico =

Coyote, New Mexico
- Unincorporated community
- Location within New Mexico Location within the United States
- Coordinates: 33°48′45″N 105°49′25″W
- Country: United States
- State: New Mexico
- County: Lincoln
- Elevation: 5,810 ft (1,770 m)
- Time zone: UTC-7 (Mountain (MST))
  - Summer (DST): UTC-6 (MDT)
- Area code: 575
- GNIS feature ID: 905466

Coyote is an unincorporated community in Lincoln County, New Mexico, United States. Coyote is located near U.S. Route 54, 12.2 miles (19.6 km) north-northeast of Carrizozo.
