= Youngsville, New Mexico =

- Census-designated place
- Location within New Mexico
- Coordinates: 36°11′15″N 106°33′23″W
- Country: United States
- State: New Mexico
- County: Rio Arriba

Area
  - Total: 0.89 sq mi (2.31 km^{2})
  - Land: 0.89 sq mi (2.30 km^{2})
  - Water: 0 sq mi (0.00 km^{2})
- Elevation: 6,864 ft (2,092 m)

Population (2020)
  - Total: 44
  - Density: 49.5/sq mi (19.11/km^{2})
- Time zone: UTC-7 (Mountain (MST))
  - Summer (DST): UTC-6 (MDT)
- ZIP code: 87064
- Area code: 575
- GNIS feature ID: 900007

Youngsville is a census-designated place in Rio Arriba County, New Mexico, United States. Its population was 44 as of the 2020 census. Youngsville has a post office with ZIP code 87064. New Mexico State Road 96 passes through the community.

== Demographics ==
Historical population
Census	Pop.	Note	%±
2020	44		—
U.S. Decennial Census

As per the American Community Survey 5 year estimates for 2019-2023 the median age of Youngsville is 79.1.

There were 26 households at an average of 1.7 people per house. 44.4% were of married couples, while 55.6% were non-family. 96.2% of these households were single-unit homes, while the other 3.9% were mobile homes.

The per capita income of Youngsville was $15,978.
