= Gallina, New Mexico =

Census-designated place in Rio Arriba County, New Mexico, United States

- Census-designated place
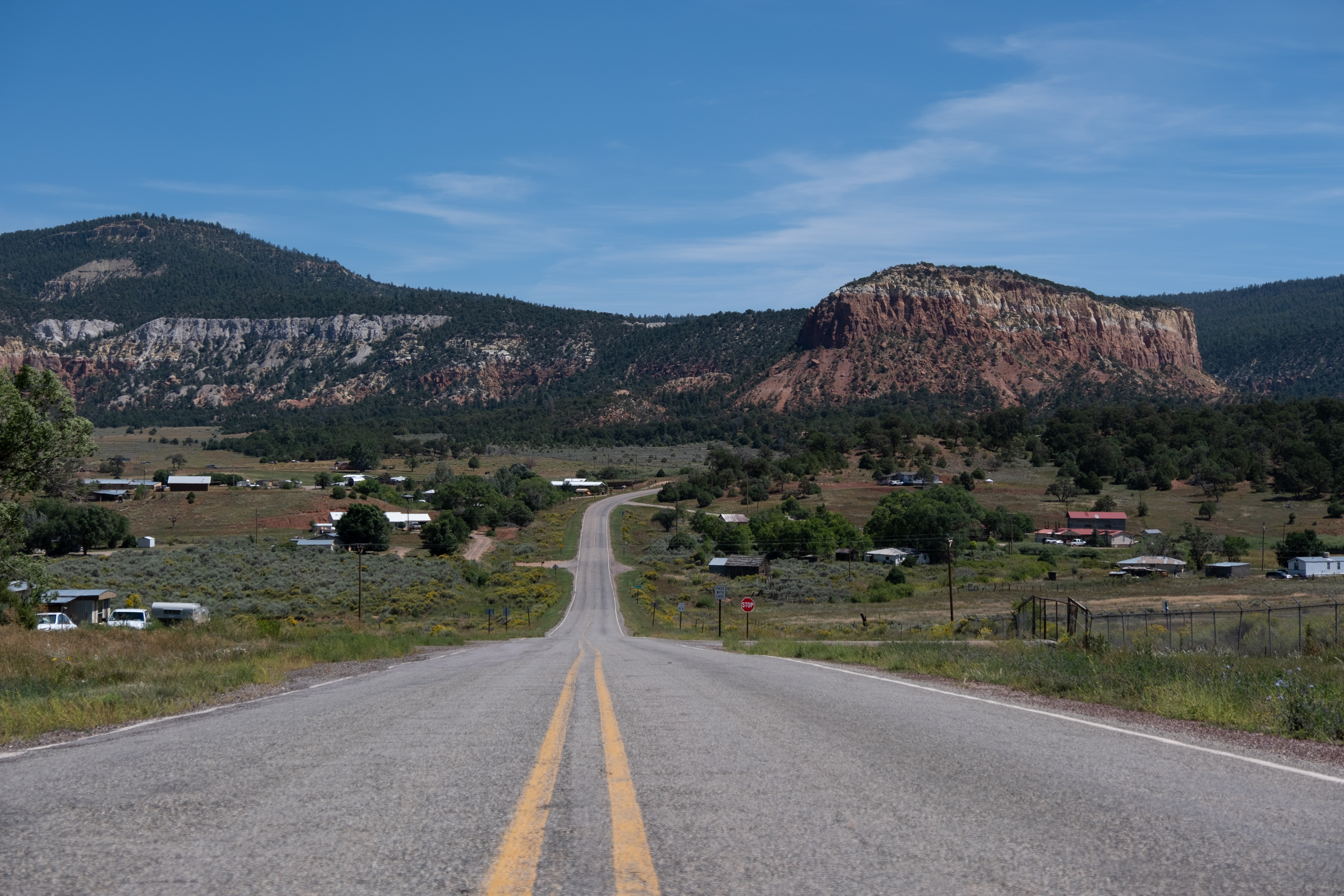
- Eastbound NM 96 in Gallina, September 2024.

- Location within New Mexico
- Coordinates: 36°13′46″N 106°49′14″W
- Country: United States
- State: New Mexico
- County: Rio Arriba

Area
  - Total: 6.30 sq mi (16.32 km^{2})
  - Land: 6.29 sq mi (16.30 km^{2})
  - Water: 0.0039 sq mi (0.01 km^{2})
- Elevation: 7,563 ft (2,305 m)

Population (2020)
  - Total: 299
  - Density: 47.5/sq mi (18.34/km^{2})
- Time zone: UTC-7 (Mountain (MST))
  - Summer (DST): UTC-6 (MDT)
- ZIP code: 87017
- Area code: 505
- GNIS feature ID: 2584067

Gallina is a census-designated place (CDP) in Rio Arriba County, New Mexico, United States. As of the 2020 census, Gallina had a population of 299. Gallina has a post office with ZIP code 87017. New Mexico State Road 96 passes through the community.

Gallina is derived from the Spanish word gallina, meaning "hen", and used figuratively to denote a coward.

== Demographics ==
Historical population
| Census | Pop. | Note | %± |
|---|---|---|---|
| 2020 | 299 | | — |
U.S. Decennial Census

== See also ==
- List of census-designated places in New Mexico
