= New Mexico State Road 291 =

State highway in New Mexico, United States

State Road 291

Route information
- Maintained by NMDOT
- Length: 3.600 mi (5.794 km)

Major junctions
- South end: NM 583 in Santa Cruz
- North end: NM 68 in Ranchitos

Location
- Country: United States
- State: New Mexico
- Counties: Santa Fe, Rio Arriba

Highway system
- New Mexico State Highway System; Interstate; US; State; Scenic
← NM 290	→ NM 292

State Road 291 (NM 291) is a 3.6-mile-long (5.8 km) state highway in the US state of New Mexico. NM 291's northern terminus is at NM 68 in Ranchitos, and the southern terminus is in Santa Cruz at NM 583.

== Major intersections ==
County	Location	mi	km	Destinations	Notes
Santa Fe	Santa Cruz	0.000	0.000	NM 583	Southern terminus
Rio Arriba	Ranchitos	3.600	5.794	NM 68	Northern terminus
1.000 mi = 1.609 km; 1.000 km = 0.621 mi
