= New Mexico State Road 598 =

Highway in New Mexico

State Road 598

Route information
- Maintained by NMDOT
- Length: 2.0 mi (3.2 km)

Major junctions
- Western end: NM 76 in Truchas
- Eastern end: End of route by Truchas

Location
- Country: United States
- State: New Mexico
- Counties: Rio Arriba

Highway system
- New Mexico State Highway System; Interstate; US; State; Scenic
← NM 597	→ NM 599

State Road 598 (NM 598) was a 2-mile-long (3.2 km) state highway in the US state of New Mexico. NM 598's western terminus was at NM 76 in Truchas, and the eastern terminus was at the end of route by Truchas. The 2016 NMDOT Highway Log does not include a NM 598 designation in the list.

== Major intersections ==
The entire route is in Rio Arriba County.

Location	mi	km	Destinations	Notes
Truchas	0.000	0.000	NM 76	Western terminus
	2.000	3.219	End of route	Eastern terminus
1.000 mi = 1.609 km; 1.000 km = 0.621 mi
