= Coyote, Rio Arriba County, New Mexico =

Coyote, New Mexico
- Census-designated place
- Location within New Mexico
- Coordinates: 36°09′55″N 106°36′59″W
- Country: United States
- State: New Mexico
- County: Rio Arriba

Area
  - Total: 4.157 sq mi (10.77 km^{2})
  - Land: 4.154 sq mi (10.76 km^{2})
  - Water: 0.003 sq mi (0.0078 km^{2})
- Elevation: 7,205 ft (2,196 m)

Population (2010)
  - Total: 128
  - Density: 30.8/sq mi (11.9/km^{2})
- Time zone: UTC-7 (Mountain (MST))
  - Summer (DST): UTC-6 (MDT)
- ZIP code: 87012
- Area code: 575
- FIPS code: 35-18660
- GNIS feature ID: 2584083

Coyote is a census-designated place in Rio Arriba County, New Mexico, United States. Its population was 128 as of the 2010 census. Coyote has a post office with ZIP code 87012. New Mexico State Road 96 passes through the community. Coyote was settled in 1862.
