= Lindrith, New Mexico =

- Unincorporated community
- Location within New Mexico
- Coordinates: 36°18′16″N 107°02′42″W
- Country: United States
- State: New Mexico
- County: Rio Arriba

Area
  - Total: 3.64 sq mi (9.44 km^{2})
  - Land: 3.64 sq mi (9.43 km^{2})
  - Water: 0.0077 sq mi (0.02 km^{2})
- Elevation: 7,237 ft (2,206 m)

Population (2020)
  - Total: 32
  - Density: 8.8/sq mi (3.39/km^{2})
- Time zone: UTC-7 (Mountain (MST))
  - Summer (DST): UTC-6 (MDT)
- ZIP code: 87029
- Area code: 505
- GNIS feature ID: 907972

Lindrith is an unincorporated community in Rio Arriba County, New Mexico, United States. As of the 2020 census, Lindrith had a population of 32. Lindrith is located in southern Rio Arriba County along New Mexico State Road 595. The community is named for Lindrith Cordell, stepson of C.C. Hill, who established a store and post office here in 1915 (now with ZIP code 87029). The Lindrith Airpark, a public-use airport, is located in Lindrith. Lindrith has a charter elementary school, the Lindrith Area Heritage School.

== Demographics ==
Historical population
Census	Pop.	Note	%±
2020	32		—
U.S. Decennial Census

== Climate ==
Climate data for Lindrith 1 WSW, New Mexico, 1991–2020 normals, extremes 1971–2023: 7220ft (2201m)
Month	Jan	Feb	Mar	Apr	May	Jun	Jul	Aug	Sep	Oct	Nov	Dec	Year
Record high °F (°C)	65 (18)	67 (19)	75 (24)	84 (29)	93 (34)	99 (37)	100 (38)	97 (36)	93 (34)	84 (29)	74 (23)	65 (18)	100 (38)
Mean maximum °F (°C)	53.9 (12.2)	55.8 (13.2)	67.8 (19.9)	75.3 (24.1)	83.8 (28.8)	92.6 (33.7)	94.5 (34.7)	90.9 (32.7)	86.6 (30.3)	77.7 (25.4)	64.5 (18.1)	55.5 (13.1)	95.3 (35.2)
Mean daily maximum °F (°C)	39.5 (4.2)	43.3 (6.3)	52.2 (11.2)	60.4 (15.8)	69.5 (20.8)	82.2 (27.9)	85.2 (29.6)	82.2 (27.9)	75.3 (24.1)	63.3 (17.4)	49.8 (9.9)	39.7 (4.3)	61.9 (16.6)
Daily mean °F (°C)	25.7 (−3.5)	29.7 (−1.3)	37.2 (2.9)	43.8 (6.6)	53.0 (11.7)	64.3 (17.9)	69.0 (20.6)	66.5 (19.2)	59.0 (15.0)	46.9 (8.3)	35.1 (1.7)	25.8 (−3.4)	46.3 (8.0)
Mean daily minimum °F (°C)	11.9 (−11.2)	16.1 (−8.8)	22.2 (−5.4)	27.1 (−2.7)	36.5 (2.5)	46.4 (8.0)	52.8 (11.6)	50.8 (10.4)	42.8 (6.0)	30.6 (−0.8)	20.5 (−6.4)	11.9 (−11.2)	30.8 (−0.7)
Mean minimum °F (°C)	−4.3 (−20.2)	1.0 (−17.2)	7.9 (−13.4)	15.1 (−9.4)	23.9 (−4.5)	34.4 (1.3)	45.6 (7.6)	43.5 (6.4)	30.5 (−0.8)	17.3 (−8.2)	4.3 (−15.4)	−5.2 (−20.7)	−8.4 (−22.4)
Record low °F (°C)	−25 (−32)	−22 (−30)	−8 (−22)	−2 (−19)	12 (−11)	21 (−6)	31 (−1)	35 (2)	18 (−8)	6 (−14)	−19 (−28)	−25 (−32)	−25 (−32)
Average precipitation inches (mm)	1.09 (28)	1.15 (29)	1.13 (29)	0.95 (24)	1.12 (28)	0.72 (18)	2.60 (66)	2.09 (53)	1.29 (33)	1.19 (30)	0.88 (22)	1.26 (32)	15.47 (392)
Average snowfall inches (cm)	12.5 (32)	9.3 (24)	6.6 (17)	2.9 (7.4)	0.1 (0.25)	0.0 (0.0)	0.0 (0.0)	0.0 (0.0)	0.0 (0.0)	2.3 (5.8)	5.8 (15)	10.9 (28)	50.4 (129.45)
Average precipitation days (≥ 0.01 in)	5.0	4.5	4.8	3.1	3.2	3.3	8.9	8.4	4.9	4.0	3.1	4.4	57.6
Average snowy days (≥ 0.1 in)	4.7	4.0	2.8	1.4	0.0	0.0	0.0	0.0	0.0	0.5	2.0	4.4	19.8
Source 1: NOAA
Source 2: XMACIS2 (records & monthly max/mins)
