= Rio Arriba County, New Mexico =

County in New Mexico, United States

- County
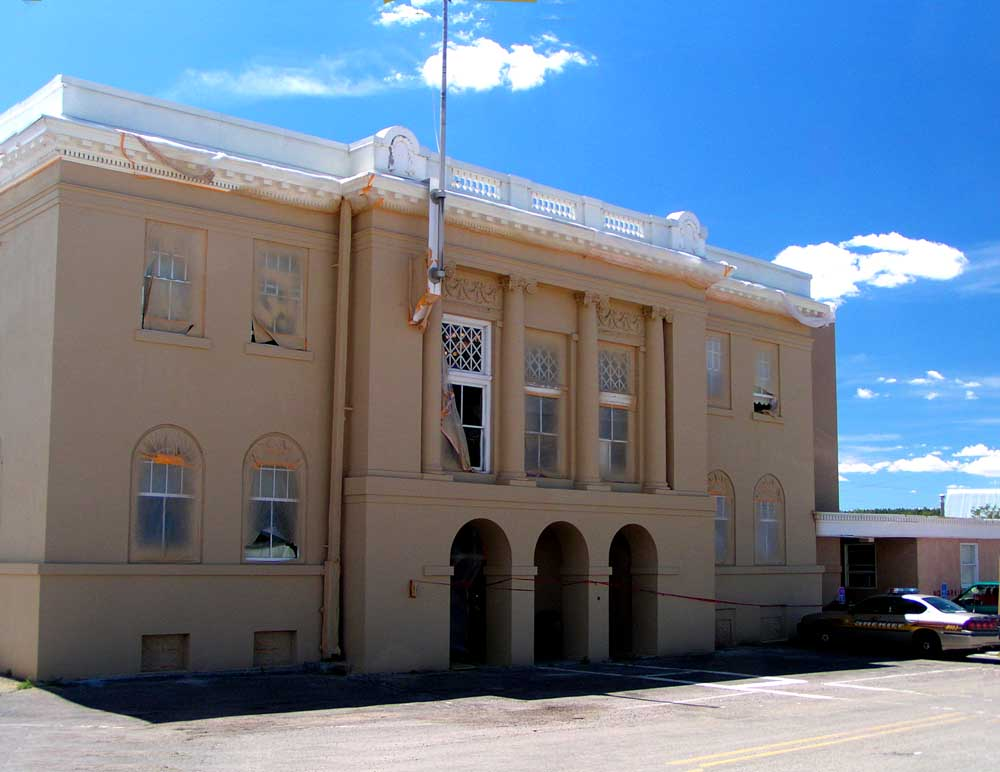
- Rio Arriba County Courthouse, Isaac Rapp, architect, 1916-17

- Seal

- Location within the U.S. state of New Mexico
- Coordinates: 36°31′N 106°42′W
- Country: United States
- State: New Mexico
- Founded: 1852
- Named for: location on the upper Rio Grande (río arriba means "upriver" in Spanish)
- Seat: Tierra Amarilla
- Largest city: Española

Government
  - County Manager: Jeremy G. Maestas

Area
  - Total: 5,896 sq mi (15,270 km^{2})
  - Land: 5,861 sq mi (15,180 km^{2})
  - Water: 35 sq mi (91 km^{2}) 0.6%

Population (2020)
  - Total: 40,363
  - Estimate (2025): 39,832 ▼
  - Density: 6.887/sq mi (2.659/km^{2})
- Time zone: UTC−7 (Mountain)
  - Summer (DST): UTC−6 (MDT)
- Congressional district: 3rd
- Website: www.rio-arriba.org

Rio Arriba County (Spanish: Condado de Río Arriba) is a county in the U.S. state of New Mexico. As of the 2020 census, the population was 40,363. Its county seat is Tierra Amarilla. Its northern border is the Colorado state line.

Rio Arriba County comprises the Española, New Mexico, micropolitan statistical area, which is also included in the Albuquerque–Santa Fe–Los Alamos combined statistical area.

== History ==
The county was one of nine originally created for the Territory of New Mexico in 1852. Originally extending west to the California line, it included the site of present-day Las Vegas, Nevada. The county seat was initially sited at San Pedro de Chamita, and shortly afterwards at Los Luceros. In 1860 the seat was moved to Plaza del Alcalde. Since 1880 Tierra Amarilla has been the county seat.

The Battle of Embudo Pass took place in the southern part of the county during the Mexican–American War in January 1847.

== Geography ==
According to the U.S. Census Bureau, the county has a total area of 5,896 square miles (15,270 km^{2}), of which 5,861 square miles (15,180 km^{2}) are land and 35 square miles (91 km^{2}) (0.6%) are water. It is the fifth-largest county in New Mexico by area. The highest point in the county is the summit of Truchas Peak at 13,102 feet (3,993 m).

The county acquired its present proportions after the creation of San Juan County and other adjustments.

=== Adjacent counties ===
- Taos County - east
- Mora County - southeast
- Santa Fe County - south
- Los Alamos County - south
- Sandoval County - south
- San Juan County - west
- Archuleta County, Colorado - north
- Conejos County, Colorado - north

=== National protected areas ===
- Carson National Forest (part)
- El Camino Real de Tierra Adentro National Historic Trail (part)
- Santa Fe National Forest (part)
- Valles Caldera National Preserve (part)

== Demographics ==
Historical population
Census	Pop.	Note	%±
1850	10,668		—
1860	9,849		−7.7%
1870	9,294		−5.6%
1880	11,023		18.6%
1890	11,534		4.6%
1900	13,777		19.4%
1910	16,624		20.7%
1920	19,552		17.6%
1930	21,381		9.4%
1940	25,352		18.6%
1950	24,997		−1.4%
1960	24,193		−3.2%
1970	25,170		4.0%
1980	29,282		16.3%
1990	34,365		17.4%
2000	41,190		19.9%
2010	40,246		−2.3%
2020	40,363		0.3%
2025 (est.)	39,832	▼	−1.3%
U.S. Decennial Census; 1790-1960 1900-1990; 1990-2000 2010

=== 2020 census ===
As of the 2020 census, the county had a population of 40,363. The median age was 43.5 years, with 21.2% of residents under the age of 18 and 21.0% aged 65 years or older. For every 100 females there were 96.6 males, and among those age 18 and over there were 95.6 males per 100 females.

Rio Arriba County, New Mexico – Racial and ethnic composition Note: the US Census treats Hispanic/Latino as an ethnic category. This table excludes Latinos from the racial categories and assigns them to a separate category. Hispanics/Latinos may be of any race.
Race / Ethnicity (NH = Non-Hispanic)	Pop 2000	Pop 2010	Pop 2020	% 2000	% 2010	% 2020
White alone (NH)	5,619	5,148	5,945	13.64%	12.79%	14.73%
Black or African American alone (NH)	85	103	160	0.21%	0.26%	0.40%
Native American or Alaska Native alone (NH)	5,002	5,651	6,135	12.14%	14.04%	15.20%
Asian alone (NH)	47	138	233	0.11%	0.34%	0.58%
Pacific Islander alone (NH)	25	7	5	0.06%	0.02%	0.01%
Other race alone (NH)	43	209	184	0.10%	0.52%	0.46%
Mixed race or Multiracial (NH)	344	287	542	0.84%	0.71%	1.34%
Hispanic or Latino (any race)	30,025	28,703	27,159	72.89%	71.32%	67.29%
Total	41,190	40,246	40,363	100.00%	100.00%	100.00%

The racial makeup of the county was 34.4% White, 0.5% Black or African American, 17.2% American Indian and Alaska Native, 0.6% Asian, 0.0% Native Hawaiian and Pacific Islander, 21.2% from some other race, and 26.1% from two or more races. Hispanic or Latino residents of any race comprised 67.3% of the population.

43.6% of residents lived in urban areas, while 56.4% lived in rural areas.

There were 16,122 households in the county, of which 29.3% had children under the age of 18 living with them and 30.1% had a female householder with no spouse or partner present. About 29.3% of all households were made up of individuals and 13.7% had someone living alone who was 65 years of age or older.

There were 19,545 housing units, of which 17.5% were vacant. Among occupied housing units, 78.9% were owner-occupied and 21.1% were renter-occupied. The homeowner vacancy rate was 1.3% and the rental vacancy rate was 7.5%.

=== 2010 census ===
As of the 2010 census, there were 40,246 people, 15,768 households, and 10,477 families living in the county. The population density was 6.9 inhabitants per square mile (2.7/km^{2}). There were 19,638 housing units at an average density of 3.4 units per square mile (1.3 units/km^{2}). The racial makeup of the county was 51.6% white, 16.0% American Indian, 0.5% black or African American, 0.4% Asian, 28.0% from other races, and 3.3% from two or more races. Those of Hispanic or Latino origin made up 71.3% of the population.

The largest ancestry groups were:

- 20.6% Mexican
- 15.5% Spanish
- 4.5% German
- 3.2% English
- 2.7% Irish
- 1.7% French
- 1.5% Navajo
- 1.2% Scottish

Of the 15,768 households, 33.6% had children under the age of 18 living with them, 42.3% were married couples living together, 16.0% had a female householder with no husband present, 33.6% were non-families, and 28.2% of all households were made up of individuals. The average household size was 2.53 and the average family size was 3.09. The median age was 39.0 years.

The median income for a household in the county was $41,437 and the median income for a family was $47,840. Males had a median income of $39,757 versus $31,657 for females. The per capita income for the county was $19,913. About 15.7% of families and 19.7% of the population were below the poverty line, including 20.6% of those under age 18 and 18.3% of those age 65 or over.

=== 2000 census ===
As of the 2000 census, there were 41,190 people, 15,044 households, and 10,816 families living in the county. The population density was 7 people per square mile (2.7 people/km^{2}). There were 18,016 housing units at an average density of 3 units per square mile (1.2/km^{2}). The racial makeup of the county was 56.62% White, 0.35% Black or African American, 13.88% Native American, 0.14% Asian, 0.11% Pacific Islander, 25.62% from other races, and 3.28% from two or more races. 72.89% of the population were Hispanic or Latino of any race.

There were 15,044 households, out of which 36.90% had children under the age of 18 living with them, 48.80% were married couples living together, 15.90% had a female householder with no husband present, and 28.10% were non-families. 23.50% of all households were made up of individuals, and 7.80% had someone living alone who was 65 years of age or older. The average household size was 2.71 and the average family size was 3.19.

In the county, the population was spread out, with 28.60% under the age of 18, 8.90% from 18 to 24, 28.80% from 25 to 44, 22.90% from 45 to 64, and 10.90% who were 65 years of age or older. The median age was 34 years. For every 100 females there were 98.00 males. For every 100 females age 18 and over, there were 97.70 males.

The median income for a household in the county was $29,429, and the median income for a family was $32,901. Males had a median income of $26,897 versus $22,223 for females. The per capita income for the county was $14,263. About 16.60% of families and 20.30% of the population were below the poverty line, including 23.30% of those under age 18 and 22.90% of those age 65 or over.

== Politics ==
From New Mexico's statehood to the early 1930s Rio Arriba was a traditional Republican county. The county became a Democratic stronghold from the 1930s onwards. The last Republican presidential candidate to carry the county was Dwight D. Eisenhower in 1956. No Republican candidate for governor has won the county since at least 1966. In the 2024 election, the county saw a Republican shift of over 7 percentage points. While Donald Trump still lost the county by almost 20 points, his performance was the best by a Republican since Nixon's landslide in 1972. In this election the Tierra Amarilla and Chama corridor flipped to being very narrowly Republican. Española trended towards Republicans, along with the majority of the population centers in the county. Despite this, Kamala Harris still won forty-one out of forty-six precincts in the county, highlighting how heavily Democrat the county still is. Rio Arriba experienced, along with McKinley, Mora, and Guadalupe Counties, the strongest Republican shift in the state of New Mexico in 2024.

United States presidential election results for Rio Arriba County, New Mexico
Year	Republican		Democratic		Third party(ies)	
Year	No.	%	No.	%	No.	%
1912	1,549	58.25%	1,004	37.76%	106	3.99%
1916	1,992	56.57%	1,528	43.40%	1	0.03%
1920	3,986	65.97%	2,056	34.03%	0	0.00%
1924	3,707	56.24%	2,734	41.48%	150	2.28%
1928	4,109	62.67%	2,444	37.27%	4	0.06%
1932	2,880	35.00%	5,337	64.86%	12	0.15%
1936	4,093	46.50%	4,691	53.29%	18	0.20%
1940	4,289	46.38%	4,952	53.55%	6	0.06%
1944	3,532	48.21%	3,792	51.75%	3	0.04%
1948	4,273	47.25%	4,753	52.56%	17	0.19%
1952	4,336	48.69%	4,564	51.25%	5	0.06%
1956	4,566	51.53%	4,291	48.43%	3	0.03%
1960	3,716	37.28%	6,250	62.69%	3	0.03%
1964	2,906	29.78%	6,787	69.56%	64	0.66%
1968	3,935	43.23%	4,799	52.72%	368	4.04%
1972	4,351	42.68%	5,642	55.34%	202	1.98%
1976	3,213	30.75%	7,125	68.19%	111	1.06%
1980	3,794	35.82%	6,245	58.97%	552	5.21%
1984	4,116	36.93%	6,938	62.25%	92	0.83%
1988	3,024	28.46%	7,503	70.61%	99	0.93%
1992	2,680	23.22%	7,832	67.86%	1,030	8.92%
1996	2,551	22.57%	7,965	70.46%	789	6.98%
2000	3,495	28.89%	8,169	67.53%	433	3.58%
2004	5,149	34.33%	9,753	65.02%	97	0.65%
2008	4,086	24.12%	12,703	74.99%	151	0.89%
2012	3,397	22.14%	11,465	74.72%	481	3.13%
2016	3,599	24.19%	9,592	64.47%	1,687	11.34%
2020	5,408	32.52%	10,990	66.09%	230	1.38%
2024	6,268	39.20%	9,373	58.62%	348	2.18%

It is located in New Mexico's 3rd congressional district, which has a Cook Partisan Voting Index rating of D+7 and is represented by Democrat Teresa Leger Fernandez. In the New Mexico legislature it is represented by Representatives Christine Chandler (District 43), Susan Herrera (District 41), Derrick Lente (District 65), Joseph Sanchez (District 40), Senator Leo Jaramillo (District 5), and Benny Shendo Jr. (District 22).

Current commissioners are:

District	Name	Party	First elected	Term ends
District 1	Brandon M. Bustos	Democratic	2023	2026
District 2	Alex M. Naranjo	Democratic	2023	2026
District 3	Moises A. Morales Jr.	Democratic	2024	2028

== Education ==
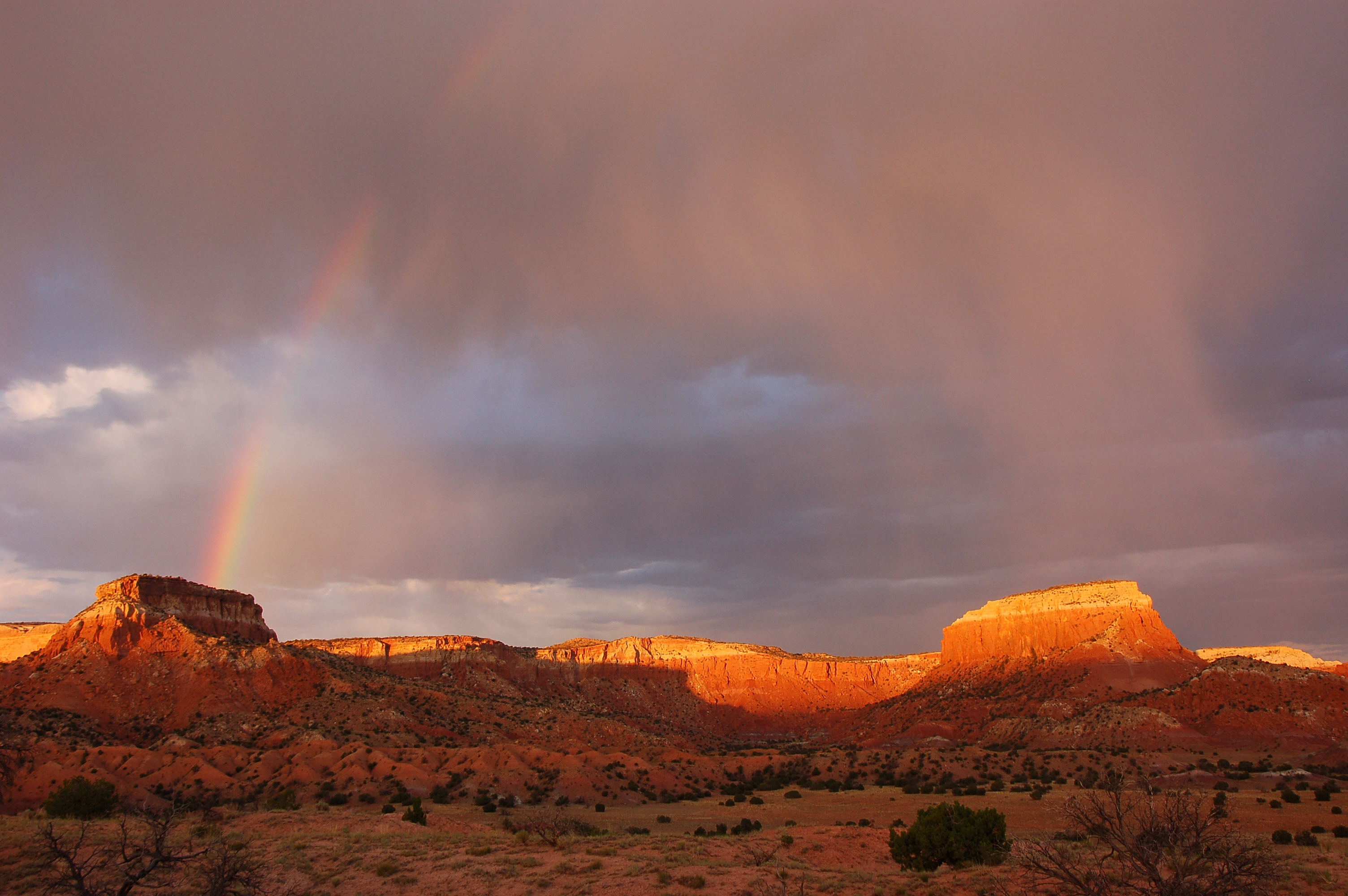
Ghost Ranch rainbow

=== Primary and secondary schools ===
Rio Arriba County has six public school districts.

- Chama Valley Independent Schools
- Dulce Independent Schools
- Española Public Schools
- Jemez Mountain Public Schools
- Mesa Vista Consolidated Schools
- Peñasco Independent Schools

Española Public Schools is the largest school district.

Additionally, there is a Bureau of Indian Education (BIE)-affiliated tribal elementary school, Kha'p'o Community School, in Santa Clara Pueblo (the school's postal address states "Espanola").

=== Colleges ===
- Northern New Mexico College with campuses in Española and El Rito
- New Mexico Highlands University campus in Española

== Points of interest ==
- Abiquiu Lake
- Chama River (Rio Grande)
- Cumbres & Toltec Scenic Railroad
- Echo Amphitheater
- Jicarilla Apache Reservation
- Puye Cliff Dwellings
- Ghost Ranch
- Monastery of Christ in the Desert & Abbey Brewing Company
- Project Gasbuggy
- Tierra Amarilla (county seat) & Brazos Cliffs

== Communities ==
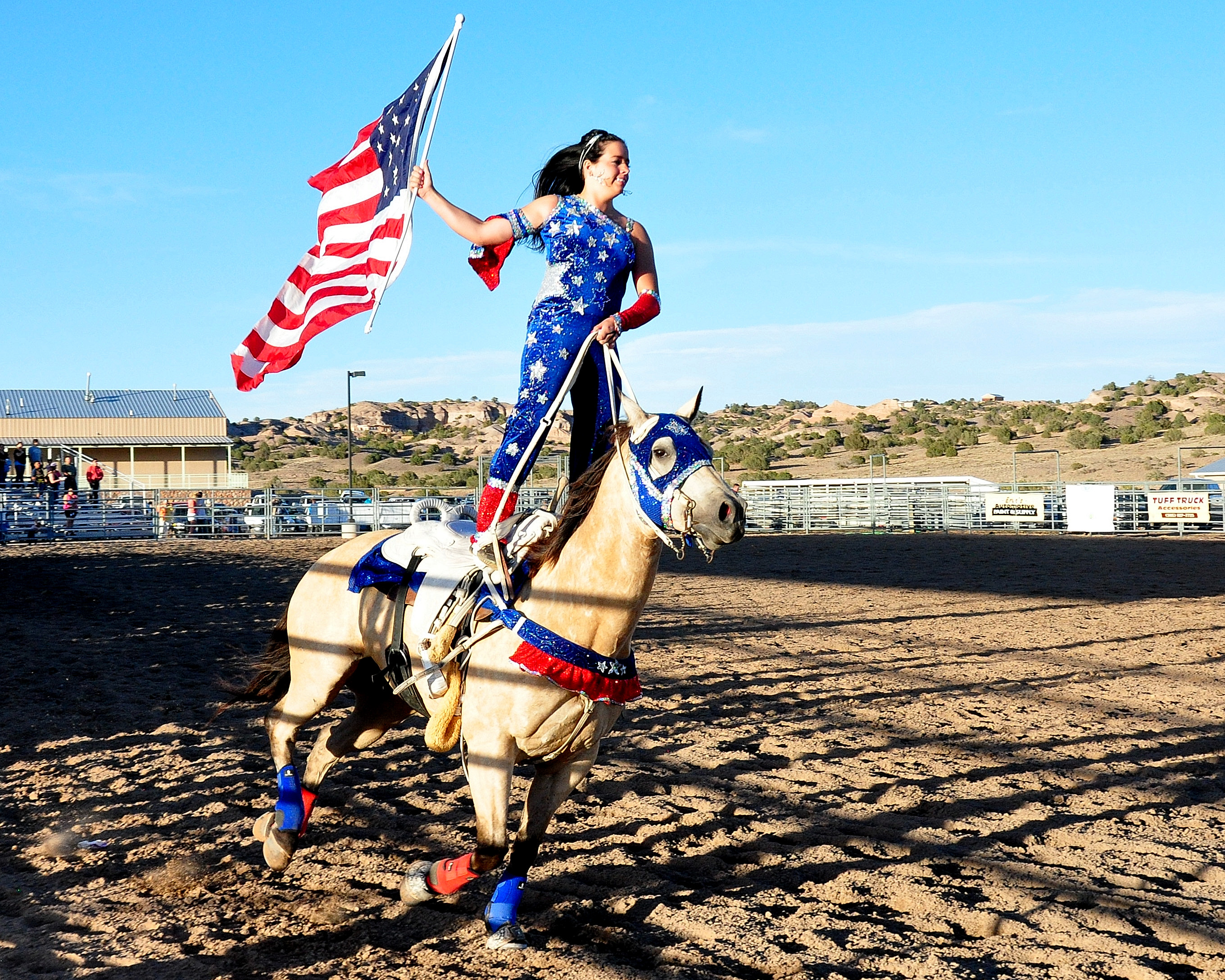
Trick Rider, Rio Arriba Rodeo, 2013

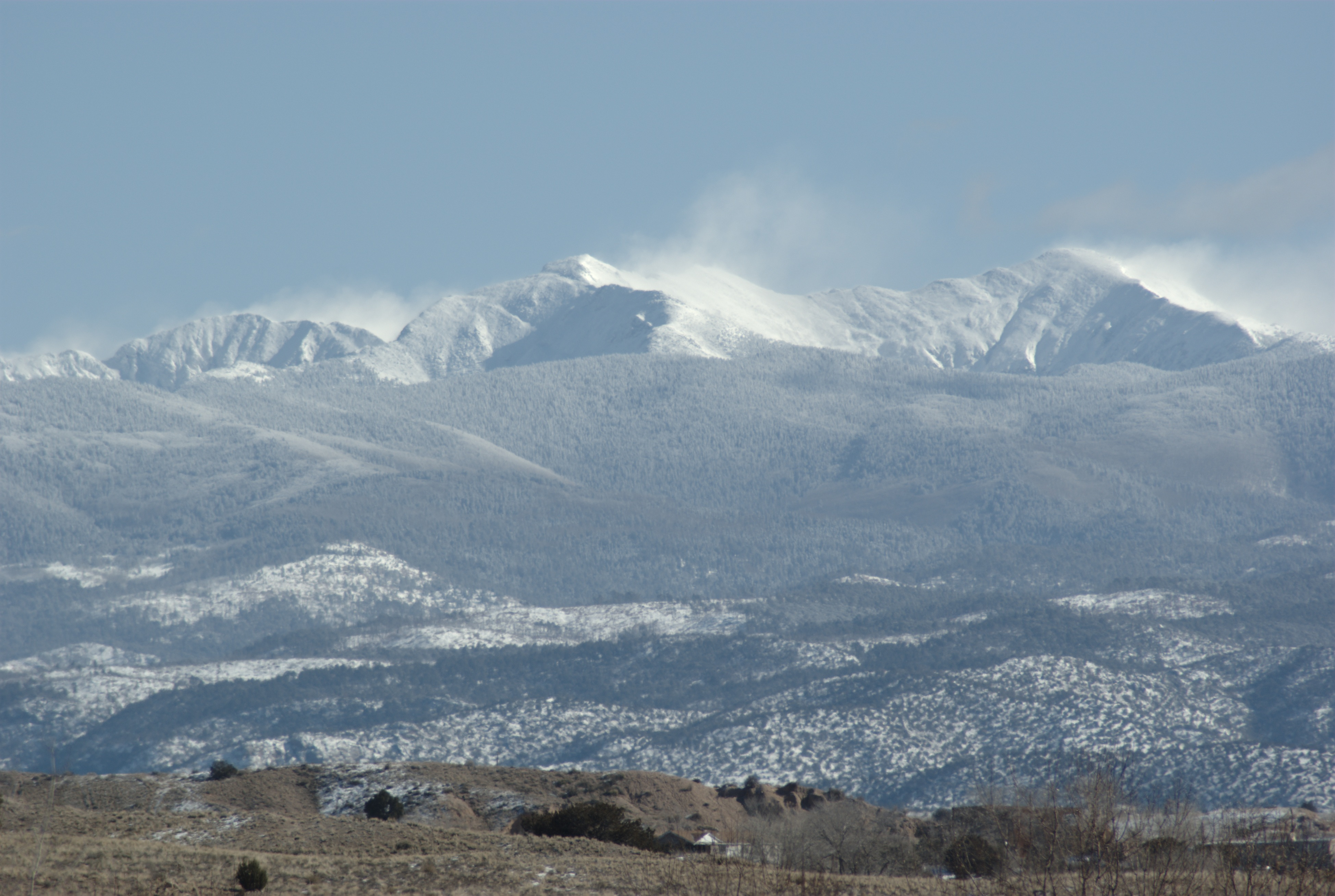
Truchas Peaks in winter, viewed from Espanola

=== City ===
- Española

=== Village ===
- Chama

=== Census-designated places ===
- Abiquiú
- Alcalde
- Brazos
- Canjilon
- Cañones
- Canova
- Chamita
- Chili
- Chimayo (part)
- Cordova
- Coyote
- Dixon
- Dulce
- El Duende
- El Rito
- Ensenada
- Gallina
- Hernandez
- La Madera
- La Mesilla
- La Villita
- Lindrith
- Los Luceros
- Los Ojos
- Lumberton
- Lybrook
- Lyden
- Medanales
- Ohkay Owingeh
- Ojo Sarco
- Pueblito
- San Jose
- San Juan
- Santa Clara Pueblo
- Tierra Amarilla (county seat)
- Truchas
- Velarde
- Youngsville

=== Other communities ===
- Arroyo del Agua
- Cañoncito
- Cebolla
- El Vado
- Embudo
- Las Tablas
- La Puente
- Lindrith
- Llaves
- Medanales
- Navajo City
- Petaca
- Plaza Blanca
- Rutheron
- San Lorenzo
- Vallecitos

=== Ghost towns ===
- Hopewell
- Riverside
- Santa Rosa de Lima
- Sublette

== Transportation ==
=== Major highways ===
- US 64
- US 84
- US 285
- US 550
- NM 17
- NM 29
- NM 30
- NM 68
- NM 74
- NM 75
- NM 76
- NM 95
- NM 96
- NM 110
- NM 111
- NM 112
- NM 115
- NM 126
- NM 162
- NM 215
- NM 221
- NM 233
- NM 291
- NM 369
- NM 399
- NM 503
- NM 511
- NM 512
- NM 514
- NM 519
- NM 527
- NM 531
- NM 537
- NM 554
- NM 571
- NM 572
- NM 573
- NM 576
- NM 580
- NM 581
- NM 583
- NM 584
- NM 595
- NM 598

== See also ==
- National Register of Historic Places listings in Rio Arriba County, New Mexico
