= Abiquiu Reservoir =

Reservoir in Rio Arriba County, New Mexico, United States

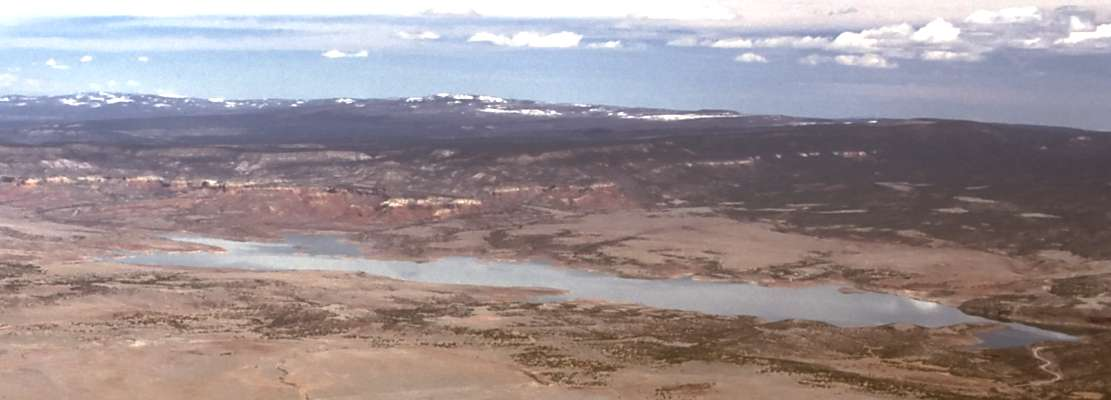
- View north from Cerro Pedernal

- Location within New Mexico Location within the United States
- Location: Rio Arriba County, New Mexico
- Coordinates: 36.240°N 106.431°W
- Type: reservoir
- Primary inflows: Rio Chama
- Primary outflows: Rio Chama
- Basin countries: United States
- Max. length: 12 mi (19 km)
- Surface area: 5,200 acres (2,100 ha)
- Water volume: 647,017 acre⋅ft (0.798084 km^{3}) (conservation); 1,192,801 acre⋅ft (1.471298 km^{3}) (flood control)
- Surface elevation: 6,184 ft (1,885 m)

Abiquiu Reservoir is a reservoir in Rio Arriba County, New Mexico, United States. Water of the Rio Chama is impounded by the earth-filled Abiquiu Dam, 1,800 feet (550 m) long and 340 feet (100 m) high, completed in 1963 and raised in 1986. The 5,200-acre (21 km^{2}) lake is over 12 miles (19 km) long, and lies at elevations of 6,100–6,220 feet (1,859–1,896 m).

The shoreline area near the dam is a recreation area managed by the US Army Corps of Engineers (USACE). Available activities include camping, picnicking, hiking, swimming, boating, and fishing.

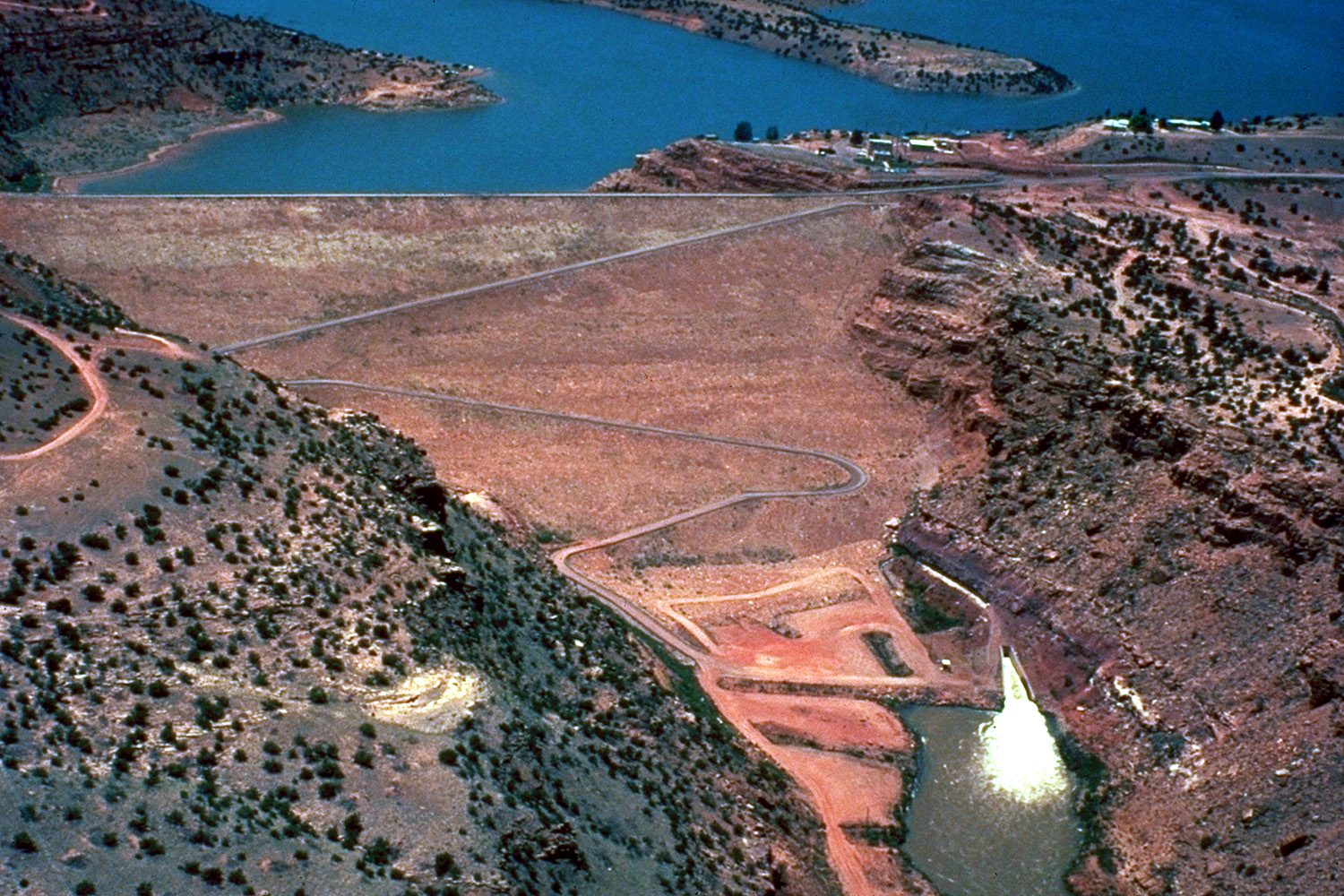
Abiquiu Dam

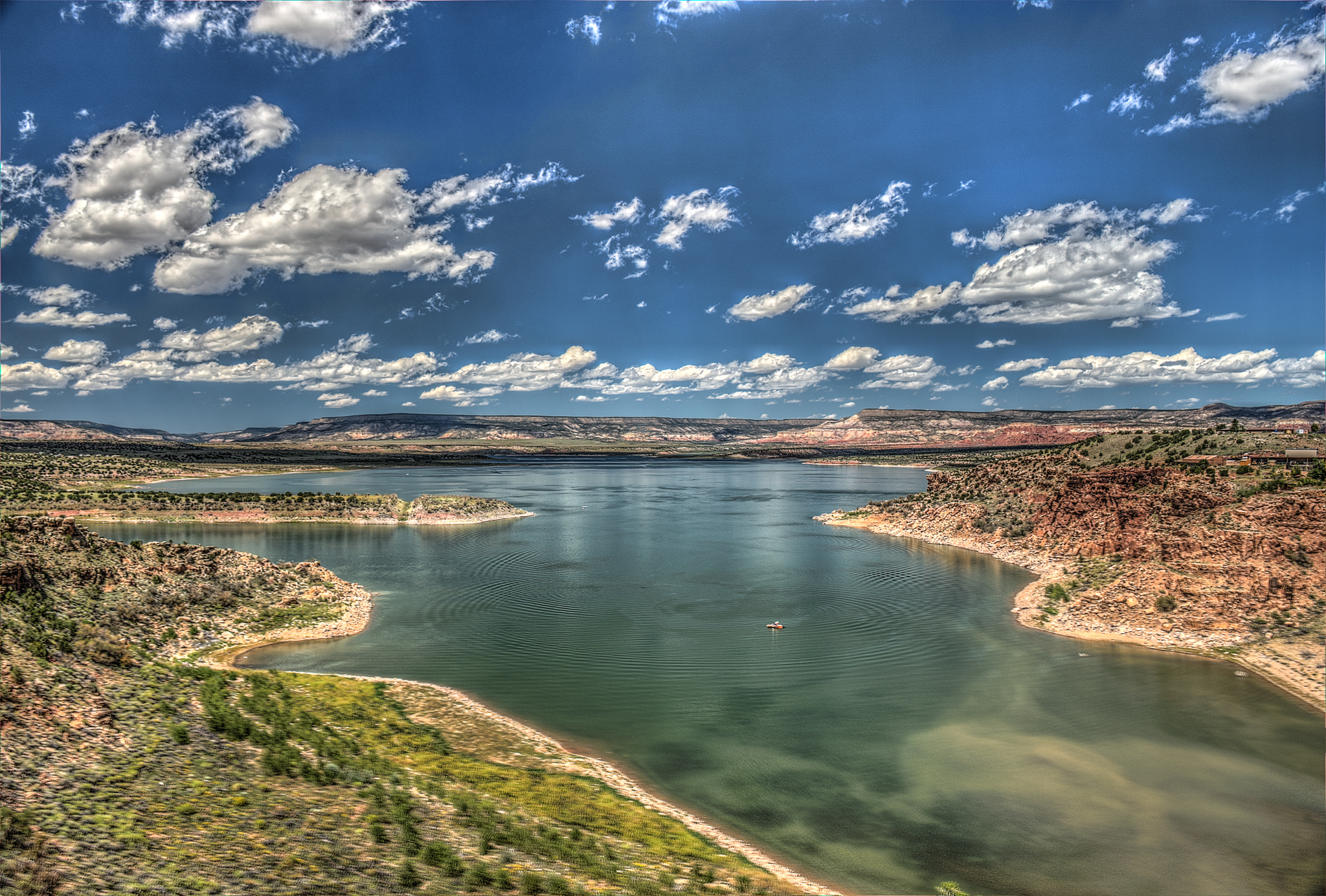
Abiquiu Reservoir
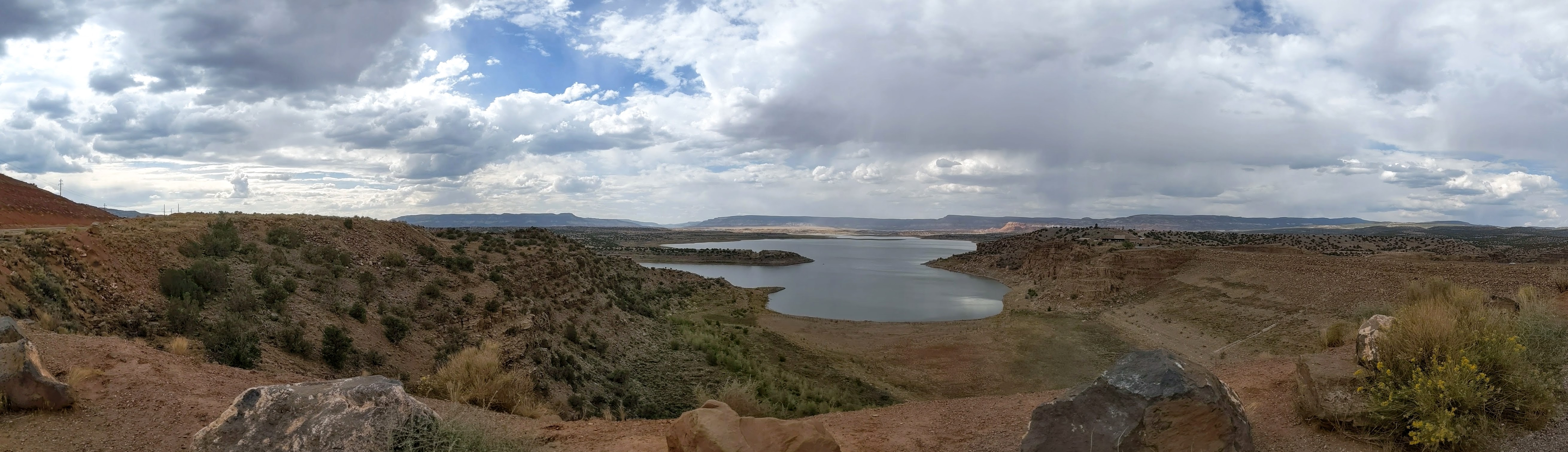
Panoramic view of Abiquiu Reservoir in the summer of 2021, with water level so low the lake doesn't reach the dam (right)

== See also ==
- List of dams and reservoirs in New Mexico
