= Regina, New Mexico =

Census-designated place in Sandoval County, New Mexico, United States

- CDP
- Location of Regina, New Mexico

- Location in the United States
- Coordinates: 36°11′39″N 106°56′34″W
- Country: United States
- State: New Mexico
- County: Sandoval

Area
  - Total: 7.31 sq mi (18.94 km^{2})
  - Land: 7.27 sq mi (18.83 km^{2})
  - Water: 0.042 sq mi (0.11 km^{2})
- Elevation: 7,480 ft (2,280 m)

Population (2020)
  - Total: 73
  - Density: 10.0/sq mi (3.88/km^{2})
- Time zone: UTC-7 (Mountain (MST))
  - Summer (DST): UTC-6 (MDT)
- ZIP code: 87046
- Area code: 505
- FIPS code: 35-62340
- GNIS feature ID: 0910111

Regina is a census-designated place (CDP) in Sandoval County, New Mexico, United States. As of the 2020 census, Regina had a population of 73. It is part of the Albuquerque Metropolitan Statistical Area. It was named for Regina, Saskatchewan.

== Geography ==
Regina is located at 36°11′39″N 106°56′34″W (36.194135, -106.942876).

According to the United States Census Bureau, the CDP has a total area of 7.3 square miles (19 km^{2}), of which 7.3 square miles (19 km^{2}) is land and 0.04 square miles (0.10 km^{2}) (0.55%) is water.

== Demographics ==
Historical population
Census	Pop.	Note	%±
2020	73		—
U.S. Decennial Census

As of the census of 2000, there were 99 people, 47 households, and 32 families residing in the CDP. The population density was 13.6 people per square mile (5.3/km^{2}). There were 106 housing units at an average density of 14.6 per square mile (5.6/km^{2}). The racial makeup of the CDP was 80.81% White, 9.09% Native American, 6.06% from other races, and 4.04% from two or more races. Hispanic or Latino of any race were 15.15% of the population.

There were 47 households, out of which 19.1% had children under the age of 18 living with them, 61.7% were married couples living together, 2.1% had a female householder with no husband present, and 29.8% were non-families. 25.5% of all households were made up of individuals, and 12.8% had someone living alone who was 65 years of age or older. The average household size was 2.11 and the average family size was 2.48.

In the CDP, the population was spread out, with 14.1% under the age of 18, 2.0% from 18 to 24, 29.3% from 25 to 44, 36.4% from 45 to 64, and 18.2% who were 65 years of age or older. The median age was 47 years. For every 100 females, there were 110.6 males. For every 100 females age 18 and over, there were 102.4 males.

The median income for a household in the CDP was $13,355, and the median income for a family was $14,659. Males had a median income of $36,250 versus $42,813 for females. The per capita income for the CDP was $12,791. There were 14.0% of families and 18.2% of the population living below the poverty line, including no under eighteens and 33.3% of those over 64.

== Education ==
Its district is Cuba Independent Schools.
