= National Register of Historic Places listings in Rio Arriba County, New Mexico =

Location of Rio Arriba County in New Mexico

This is a list of the National Register of Historic Places listings in Rio Arriba County, New Mexico.

This is intended to be a complete list of the properties and districts on the National Register of Historic Places in Rio Arriba County, New Mexico, United States. Latitude and longitude coordinates are provided for many National Register properties and districts; these locations may be seen together in a map.

There are 117 properties and districts listed on the National Register in the county, including 3 National Historic Landmarks. One former site on the Register is located within the county.

This National Park Service list is complete through NPS recent listings posted August 14, 2026.

Contents: NRHP in New Mexico by county
Bernalillo – Catron – Chaves – Cibola – Colfax – Curry – De Baca – Doña Ana – Eddy – Grant – Guadalupe – Harding – Hidalgo – Lea – Lincoln – Los Alamos – Luna – McKinley – Mora – Otero – Quay – Rio Arriba – Roosevelt – San Juan – San Miguel – Sandoval – Santa Fe – Sierra – Socorro – Taos – Torrance – Union – Valencia

== Current listings ==
	Name on the Register	Image	Date listed	Location	City or town	Description
1	Abiquiu Mesa Grid Gardens		December 7, 1982 (#82001051)	Address Restricted	Abiquiú	State Register of Cultural Properties (SRCP)
2	Adams Canyon Site (LA 55824)		January 21, 1987 (#86003631)	Address Restricted	Tierra Amarilla	SRCP
3	Adolfo Canyon Site (LA 5665)	Adolfo Canyon Site (LA 5665)	January 21, 1987 (#86003605)	Address Restricted	Tierra Amarilla	SRCP
4	Martin Apodaca Homestead		July 17, 2017 (#100001324)	Address Restricted	Counselor	
5	Archeological Site No. AR-03-10-02-357		May 14, 1989 (#89000345)	Address Restricted	Llaves	
6	George Becker House	George Becker House	April 4, 1985 (#85000777)	East of La Puente Rd. and south of Hatchery Rd. 36°43′13″N 106°34′48″W	Los Ojos	SRCP
7	Blanton Log House		April 4, 1985 (#85000778)	East of La Puente Rd. and south of Hatchery Rd. 36°43′11″N 106°34′51″W	Los Ojos	SRCP
8	Frank Bond House	Frank Bond House	March 6, 1980 (#80002564)	Bond St. 35°59′28″N 106°04′57″W	Espanola	SRCP
9	Boulder Fortress (LA 55828)		January 21, 1987 (#86003630)	Address Restricted	Tierra Amarilla	SRCP
10	Burns Lake Bungalow		April 4, 1985 (#85000780)	½ mile south of the eastern end of Hatchery Rd. 36°42′52″N 106°34′55″W	Los Ojos	SRCP
11	Cabresto Mesa Tower Complex (LA 2138)		January 21, 1987 (#86003611)	Address Restricted	Tierra Amarilla	SRCP
12	Cagle's Site (LA 55826)		January 21, 1987 (#86003629)	Address Restricted	Tierra Amarilla	SRCP
13	Canyon View Ruin (LA 55827)		January 21, 1987 (#86003628)	Address Restricted	Tierra Amarilla	SRCP
14	Casa Mesa Diablo (LA 11100)		January 21, 1987 (#86003641)	Address Restricted	Tierra Amarilla	SRCP
15	Casados House		April 4, 1985 (#85000825)	Off the junction of U.S. Route 84 and State Road 95; 36°44′20″N 106°34′10″W	Los Ojos	SRCP
16	Castles of the Chama (AR-03-10-01-216)		May 14, 1989 (#89000344)	Address Restricted	Llaves	SRCP
17	E.D. Chimayo Trading Post and Trujillo House	E.D. Chimayo Trading Post and Trujillo House	May 13, 1999 (#99000500)	110 Sandia Dr. 35°59′28″N 106°04′04″W	Espanola	SRCP
18	The Citadel (LA 55828)		January 21, 1987 (#86003627)	Address Restricted	Tierra Amarilla	SRCP
19	Compressor Station Ruin (LA 5658)		January 21, 1987 (#86003592)	Address Restricted	Tierra Amarilla	SRCP
20	Corral Canyon Pueblo Site		November 7, 1990 (#90001581)	Address Restricted	Espanola	
21	Corral Mesa Cavate Pueblo Site		November 7, 1990 (#90001584)	Address Restricted	Espanola	
22	Crevice Ruin (LA 13218)		January 21, 1987 (#86003639)	Address Restricted	Tierra Amarilla	SRCP
23	Crow Canyon Archaeological District	Crow Canyon Archaeological District	July 15, 1974 (#74001200)	Address Restricted	Farmington	SRCP; extends into San Juan County
24	Crow Canyon Site (LA 20219)	Crow Canyon Site (LA 20219)	January 21, 1987 (#86003638)	Address Restricted	Tierra Amarilla	SRCP
25	Delgadito Pueblito (LA 5649)		January 21, 1987 (#86003590)	Address Restricted	Tierra Amarilla	SRCP
26	Denver & Rio Grande Railroad San Juan Extension	Denver & Rio Grande Railroad San Juan Extension	February 16, 1973 (#73000462)	Between Antonito, Colorado and Chama, New Mexico via Cumbres Pass; 36°51′56″N 106°23′56″W	Chama	SRCP
27	Dogie Canyon School		July 17, 2017 (#100001325)	Address Restricted	Counselor	
28	El Barranco Community Ditch		September 29, 1986 (#86002296)	Extending from the Chama River at Chama Division to Upper Brazos Ditch; 36°46′35″N 106°33′51″W	Brazos	SRCP
29	El Buen Pastor Cemetery		July 17, 2017 (#100001326)	Address Restricted	Counselor	
30	El Porvenir Community Ditch		September 29, 1986 (#86002300)	Extending from 4.5 miles east of Ensenada to 0.5 miles north of Ensenada; 36°43′57″N 106°30′36″W	Ensenada	SRCP
31	Embudo Historic District	Embudo Historic District	March 12, 1979 (#79001547)	State Road 68; 36°12′25″N 105°57′41″W	Embudo	SRCP
32	Ensenada Community Ditch		September 29, 1986 (#86002303)	Extending from 4.5 miles east of Ensenada to 0.3 miles west of U.S. Route 85, 0.5 miles northeast of State Fish Hatchery; 36°43′29″N 106°31′49″W	Ensenada	SRCP
33	Foothold Ruin (LA 9073)	Foothold Ruin (LA 9073)	January 21, 1987 (#86003602)	Address Restricted	Tierra Amarilla	SRCP
34	Forest Service Site No. AR-03-10-01-374		December 20, 1993 (#93001421)	Address Restricted	Coyote	
35	Forest Service Site No. AR-03-10-01-390		December 20, 1993 (#93001424)	Address Restricted	Coyote	
36	Foster Hotel	Foster Hotel	February 13, 1986 (#86000225)	4th and Terrace; 36°54′15″N 106°34′42″W	Chama	SRCP
37	Frances Canyon Ruin	Frances Canyon Ruin	September 4, 1970 (#70000404)	Address Restricted; 36°45′54″N 107°29′53″W	Blanco	SRCP
38	Garcia Canyon Pueblito (LA 36608)		January 21, 1987 (#86003636)	Address Restricted	Tierra Amarilla	SRCP
39	Gomez Canyon Ruin (LA 55831)	Gomez Canyon Ruin (LA 55831)	January 21, 1987 (#86003626)	Address Restricted	Tierra Amarilla	SRCP
40	Gomez Point Site (LA 58832)		January 21, 1987 (#86003625)	Address Restricted	Tierra Amarilla	SRCP
41	Tomas Gonzales House		March 14, 1996 (#96000258)	County Road 155, 2 miles east of its junction with U.S. Route 84; 36°13′18″N 106°18′16″W	Abiquiú	SRCP
42	Gould Pass Ruin (LA 5659)	Gould Pass Ruin (LA 5659)	January 21, 1987 (#86003594)	Address Restricted	Tierra Amarilla	SRCP
43	Haynes Trading Post Site		April 9, 2018 (#100002301)	Address Restricted	Counselor	
44	Hill Road Ruin (LA 55833)	Hill Road Ruin (LA 55833)	January 21, 1987 (#86003624)	Address Restricted	Tierra Amarilla	SRCP
45	Hooded Fireplace Ruin (LA 5662)	Hooded Fireplace Ruin (LA 5662)	January 21, 1987 (#86003607)	Address Restricted	Tierra Amarilla	SRCP
46	Hupobi-ouinge		January 18, 1985 (#85000111)	Address Restricted	Ojo Caliente	SRCP
47	Ramon Jaramillo House and Barn		September 29, 1986 (#86002309)	Ensednada Rd. 36°44′01″N 106°31′58″W	Ensenada	SRCP
48	Jicarilla Apache Historic District		March 1, 1984 (#84002956)	Main St., State Road 17, Apache, Keliiaa, and Sand Hill Drs. 36°56′02″N 107°00′01″W	Dulce	A residential historic district including 30 houses. SRCP.
49	Kin Naa daa (Maize House) (LA 1872)	Kin Naa daa (Maize House) (LA 1872)	January 21, 1987 (#86003612)	Address Restricted	Tierra Amarilla	SRCP
50	Ku-ouinge		August 5, 1993 (#93000674)	Address Restricted	Espanola	SRCP
51	La Puente Community Ditch		September 29, 1986 (#86002294)	Extending from Parkview discharge point to 0.7 miles southwest of La Puente on the Chama River; 36°42′06″N 106°35′52″W	La Puente	SRCP
52	La Puente Historic District		April 4, 1985 (#85000826)	Roughly bounded by Main Rd. in La Puente from drop-off of 2nd to 1st plateau east to the church on the west 36°42′01″N 106°36′03″W	La Puente	SRCP
53	Largo School Ruin (LA 5657)	Largo School Ruin (LA 5657)	January 21, 1987 (#86003621)	Address Restricted	Tierra Amarilla	SRCP
54	Leaf Water Pueblo (LA 300)		December 1, 1983 (#83004155)	Address Restricted	Hernandez	SRCP
55	Los Brazos Historic District		April 4, 1985 (#85000827)	Roughly bounded by U.S. Route 84, North Rd., fence line and drop-off to Rio Brazos; 36°45′06″N 106°33′38″W	Brazos	SRCP
56	Los Luceros Hacienda	Los Luceros Hacienda	October 20, 1983 (#83004157)	Off State Road 68; 36°07′06″N 106°02′22″W	Los Luceros	SRCP
57	Los Ojos (Parkview) Fish Hatchery		April 4, 1985 (#85000779)	Eastern end of Hatchery Rd. 36°43′10″N 106°34′24″W	Los Ojos	SRCP
58	Los Ojos (Parkview) Historic District		April 4, 1985 (#85000828)	Roughly bounded by the U.S. Route 84 junction with the old highway, drop-off from the first plateau to the Chama River valley and E.-W. Hatchery Rd. 36°43′49″N 106°34′14″W	Los Ojos	SRCP
59	Franklin MacFie House		August 19, 2024 (#100010755)	220 County Road 140; 36°09′13″N 106°10′08″W	Hernandez vicinity	
60	Tony Manzanares House		April 4, 1985 (#85000829)	East of Los Ojos Rd. and north of La Puente Church; 36°42′25″N 106°35′50″W	Los Ojos	SRCP
61	Gilbert Martinez Barn		April 4, 1985 (#85000781)	East of La Puente Rd and south of Hatchery Rd. 36°43′17″N 106°34′44″W	Los Ojos	SRCP
62	Margarita Martinez Homestead		July 17, 2017 (#100001328)	Address Restricted	Counselor	
63	Teodoro Martinez House		April 4, 1985 (#85000782)	East of La Puente Rd and north of Hatchery Rd. 36°43′22″N 106°34′42″W	Los Ojos	SRCP
64	Mesa Prieta Petroglyphs		September 24, 1998 (#98001159)	Address Restricted	Velarde	SRCP
65	Luciano Miera Store–Homestead		July 17, 2017 (#100001329)	Address Restricted	Counselor	
66	Nogales Cliff House (AR-03-10-02-124)		May 14, 1989 (#89000346)	Address Restricted	Llaves	SRCP
67	Georgia O'Keeffe Ghost Ranch House		December 14, 2020 (#100005933)	US-84, 280 Private Dr. 1708, House 115 northwest of the Ghost Ranch Education and Retreat Center; 36°19′56″N 106°28′14″W	Abiquiú vicinity	
68	Georgia O'Keeffe Home and Studio	Georgia O'Keeffe Home and Studio	August 5, 1998 (#98001197)	County Road 164, House No. 13; 36°12′29″N 106°19′01″W	Abiquiú	SRCP
69	Old Fort (LA 1869)		January 21, 1987 (#86003614)	Address Restricted	Tierra Amarilla	SRCP
70	Victor Ortega Cabin		January 28, 1988 (#87002456)	Carson National Forest; 36°34′05″N 106°21′02″W	Cebolla	SRCP
71	Our Lady of Lourdes Grotto	Our Lady of Lourdes Grotto	March 27, 1987 (#86002318)	Old Highway; 36°43′34″N 106°33′57″W	Los Ojos	SRCP
72	Overlook Site (LA 10732)		January 21, 1987 (#86003601)	Address Restricted	Tierra Amarilla	SRCP
73	Parkview Community Ditch		September 29, 1986 (#86002305)	Extending from 4.5 miles east of Encenada to 1 mile southwest of the State Fish Hatchery; 36°43′53″N 106°32′04″W	Los Ojos	SRCP
74	Plaza Blanca Community Ditch		September 29, 1986 (#86002298)	Extending from 2 miles west-southwest of the State Fish Hatchery to 1 mile south-southwest of Plaza Blanca; 36°42′19″N 106°36′20″W	Plaza Blanca	SRCP
75	Plaza Blanca Historic District		September 29, 1986 (#86002322)	Roughly Plaza Blanca and Old Puente Ford Rds. adjacent to Plaza Blanca Ditch; 36°42′15″N 106°36′32″W	Plaza Blanca	SRCP
76	Pointed Butte Ruin (LA 10733)	Pointed Butte Ruin (LA 10733)	January 21, 1987 (#86003600)	Address Restricted	Tierra Amarilla	SRCP
77	Ponsipa'Akeri		August 5, 1993 (#93000673)	Address Restricted	Ojo Caliente	SRCP
78	Pork Chop Pass Site (LA 5661)		January 21, 1987 (#86003597)	Address Restricted	Tierra Amarilla	SRCP
79	Posi-ouinge	Posi-ouinge	August 5, 1993 (#93000675)	On a bluff southwest of Ojo Caliente; 36°17′58″N 106°03′22″W	Ojo Caliente	SRCP; extends into Taos County
80	Pueblito Canyon Ruin (LA 1684)		January 21, 1987 (#86003615)	Address Restricted	Tierra Amarilla	SRCP
81	Pueblito East Ruin (LA 55834)		January 21, 1987 (#86003623)	Address Restricted	Tierra Amarilla	SRCP
82	Puye Ruins	Puye Ruins	October 15, 1966 (#66000481)	Santa Clara Pueblo; 35°58′32″N 106°13′39″W	Espanola	Extends into Sandoval County
83	Rattlesnake Ridge Site		October 27, 1992 (#92001405)	Address Restricted; 36°29′01″N 106°49′23″W	Llaves	
84	Ridge Top House (LA 6287)		January 21, 1987 (#86003603)	Address Restricted	Tierra Amarilla	SRCP
85	Rincon Largo Ruin (LA 2436 and LA 2435)		January 21, 1987 (#86003589)	Address Restricted	Tierra Amarilla	SRCP
86	Rincon Rockshelter (LA 55835)		January 21, 1987 (#86003622)	Address Restricted	Tierra Amarilla	SRCP
87	Rio Grande Bridge at San Juan Pueblo	Rio Grande Bridge at San Juan Pueblo	August 14, 1997 (#97000738)	Old alignment of State Road 74 over the Rio Grande; 36°03′22″N 106°04′57″W	Alcalde	Parker truss bridge
88	Romine Canyon Ruin (LA 55836)		January 21, 1987 (#86003620)	Address Restricted	Tierra Amarilla	SRCP
89	Romine Ranch Site (LA 55837)		January 21, 1987 (#86003619)	Address Restricted	Tierra Amarilla	SRCP
90	San Antonio de Padua del Quemado Chapel		November 2, 1978 (#78001821)	Off State Road 76; 36°00′27″N 105°51′35″W	Cordova	SRCP
91	San Gabriel de Yungue-Ouinge	San Gabriel de Yungue-Ouinge	October 15, 1966 (#66000482)	Near the confluence of the Rio Chama and Rio Grande; 36°03′02″N 106°03′37″W	Ohkay Owingeh	Archaeological site of first Spanish New Mexico capital; historical marker nearby
92	San Joaquin Church		September 29, 1986 (#86002310)	State Road 162; 36°43′34″N 106°32′01″W	Ensenada	SRCP
93	San Juan Pueblo	San Juan Pueblo	July 30, 1974 (#74001201)	North of Santa Fe; 36°03′15″N 106°04′13″W	Ohkay Owingeh Pueblo	SRCP
94	Samuel Sanchez Barns		September 29, 1986 (#86002317)	Off U.S. Route 64; 36°45′55″N 106°33′35″W	Brazos	SRCP
95	Samuel Sanchez House	Samuel Sanchez House	September 29, 1986 (#86002315)	Off U.S. Route 64; 36°45′59″N 106°33′34″W	Brazos	SRCP
96	Sanchez-March House	Sanchez-March House	April 4, 1985 (#85000830)	West of U.S. Route 84 and north of State Road 95; 36°44′23″N 106°34′09″W	Los Ojos	SRCP
97	Santa Clara Pueblo	Santa Clara Pueblo	November 5, 1974 (#74001199)	South of Espanola off State Road 30; 35°58′05″N 106°05′19″W	Santa Clara Pueblo	SRCP
98	Santa Rosa de Lima de Abiquiu	Santa Rosa de Lima de Abiquiu	April 14, 1978 (#78001820)	Address Restricted	Abiquiú	SRCP
99	Shaft House (LA 5660)	Shaft House (LA 5660)	January 21, 1987 (#86003595)	Address Restricted	Tierra Amarilla	SRCP
100	Split Rock Ruin (LA 5664)	Split Rock Ruin (LA 5664)	January 21, 1987 (#86003606)	Address Restricted	Tierra Amarilla	SRCP
101	Tapicito Ruin (LA 2298)	Tapicito Ruin (LA 2298)	January 21, 1987 (#86003610)	Address Restricted	Tierra Amarilla	SRCP
102	Three Corn Ruin (LA 1871)		January 21, 1987 (#86003613)	Address Restricted	Tierra Amarilla	
103	Tierra Amarilla AFS P-8 Historic District	Tierra Amarilla AFS P-8 Historic District	February 26, 2001 (#00000342)	9.0 miles southeast of Tierra Amarilla on State Road 112; 36°37′25″N 106°39′44″W	Tierra Amarilla	SRCP
104	Tierra Amarilla Community Ditch		September 29, 1986 (#86002307)	Extending from 2 miles east-southeast of Tierra Amarilla to 0.2 miles north of La Corridera Rd. 36°41′36″N 106°33′05″W	Tierra Amarilla	SRCP
105	Tierra Amarilla Historic District	Tierra Amarilla Historic District	September 29, 1986 (#86002327)	Roughly along La Puente Rd. on both sides of U.S. Route 84 and along Old Highway and Creek Rd. 36°42′01″N 106°33′24″W	Tierra Amarilla	SRCP
106	Tower of the Standing God (LA 55839)		January 21, 1987 (#86003618)	Address Restricted	Tierra Amarilla	SRCP
107	Truby's Tower (LA 2434)		January 21, 1987 (#86003608)	Address Restricted	Tierra Amarilla	SRCP
108	Manuelita Trujillo House		April 4, 1985 (#85000831)	Off U.S. Route 84 south of the Los Brazos River; 36°44′46″N 106°34′04″W	Los Ojos	SRCP
109	Fernando Trujillo Sr. House		April 4, 1985 (#85000832)	West of U.S. Route 84 and north of State Road 95; 36°44′32″N 106°34′09″W	Los Ojos	SRCP
110	Tsama Pueblo	Tsama Pueblo	November 17, 1983 (#83004158)	Address Restricted	Abiquiú	SRCP
111	Tsiping		September 4, 1970 (#70000405)	Address Restricted	Canones	SRCP
112	Unreachable Rockshelter (LA 55841)		January 21, 1987 (#86003616)	Address Restricted	Tierra Amarilla	SRCP
113	Miguel Valdez Barn		September 29, 1986 (#86002314)	San Joaquin Church Loop Rd. 36°43′31″N 106°31′45″W	Ensenada	SRCP
114	Vicenti Site		May 14, 1979 (#79001546)	Address Restricted	Dulce	SRCP
115	Senon S. Vigil Homestead		July 17, 2017 (#100001331)	Address Restricted	Counselor	
116	The Wall (LA 55840)		January 21, 1987 (#86003617)	Address Restricted	Tierra Amarilla	SRCP
117	Whitaker Dinosaur Quarry		October 19, 2018 (#100003030)	1708 U.S. Route 84; 36°19′51″N 106°28′21″W	Abiquiu	Apparently on the Ghost Ranch.

== Former listing ==
	Name on the Register	Image	Date listed	Date removed	Location	City or town	Description
1	Officer's House		April 4, 1985 (#85003624)		E of La Puente Rd.	Los Ojos	Former SRCP

== See also ==
- List of National Historic Landmarks in New Mexico
