= Fesere =

Tewa Pueblo ancestral site in New Mexico

Fesere (Tewa: Phéh Seḏeh Ówîngeh Kayyee), also Poihuuinge or Pesedeuinge, is a Tewa Pueblo ancestral site in an address-restricted area of Abiquiú, New Mexico. It was occupied from around 1350 until around 1450.

Pesedeuinge is one of the principal Tewa Pueblo ancestral sites in New Mexico, US. The prehistoric pueblo is situated on a mesa west or south of the Rio Chama, near Abiquiu, Rio Arriba County. Coordinates: 36.0886°N 106.1615°W.
