= Ramon Jaramillo House and Barn =

Historic property in Ensenada, New Mexico, United States

- U.S. National Register of Historic Places
- Location within New Mexico
- Location: Ensenada Road (NM 573); Ensenada, New Mexico
- Coordinates: 36°44′01″N 106°31′58″W
- Area: less than one acre
- Built: 1887
- MPS: La Tierra Amarilla MRA
- NRHP reference No.: 86002309
- Added to NRHP: September 29, 1986

The Ramon Jaramillo House and Barn, on Ensenada Road (NM 573) in Ensenada, New Mexico, United States, was listed on the National Register of Historic Places in 1986.

== Description ==
The house is stucco covered and had a corrugated roof, with cutout scroll ornamentation in its gables, and was built in 1887.

The main barn is built of hewn horizontal logs with dovetail notching, and was built in the 1880s. It has a small shed attached which was added in the 1920s.

== See also ==
- National Register of Historic Places listings in Rio Arriba County, New Mexico
