= Parkview Community Ditch =

- U.S. National Register of Historic Places
- Nearest city: Los Ojos, New Mexico
- Coordinates: 36°43′53″N 106°32′04″W
- Area: 39.3 acres (15.9 ha)
- Architectural style: Irrigation ditch
- MPS: La Tierra Amarilla MRA
- NRHP reference No.: 86002305
- Added to NRHP: September 29, 1986

The Parkview Community Ditch, near Los Ojos, New Mexico, is an 8.1-mile-long (13.0 km) irrigation ditch diverting water from the Brazos River which was dug in 1862. It was listed on the National Register of Historic Places in 1986.

It is the longest irrigation ditch in the area, and descends 100 feet (30 m) in elevation from the Ensenada plateau to Parkview. A flour mill or molino is believed to have existed at the steepest point of the ditch's fall. It supplies the Ensenada Ditch and the El Porvenir Ditch, both 4.5 miles (7,200 m) from Ensenada and also supplies the La Puente Community Ditch, also NRHP-listed.

The ditch is six feet (1.8 m) wide at the bottom, eight feet (2.4 m) at the top, and 1.5 feet (0.46 m) deep.
