= Maria Chabot =

Native American arts advocate

- Maria Chabot and Skull, 1944
- Born: Mary Lee Chabot; September 19, 1913; San Antonio, Texas
- Died: July 9, 2001 (age 87); Albuquerque, New Mexico
- Occupations: Indigenous peoples rights activist, writer
- Spouse: Dana K. Bailey (married in 1961 for six months)
- Partner: Dorothy Stewart (1933–1939)

Maria Chabot (September 19, 1913 – July 9, 2001) was a writer, an advocate for Native American arts, a rancher, and a friend of Georgia O'Keeffe. She led the restoration, design, and building of O'Keeffe's home and studio in Abiquiú, New Mexico. She was also a gifted photographer, and took many famous photographs of the artist and her life. These include photos of camping trips to the Black Place and the photograph of O'Keeffe entitled Women Who Rode Away, which shows the artist sitting on the back of a motorcycle driven by Maurice Grosser. Some correspondence related to the building of the Abiquiu house was published in the book Maria Chabot—Georgia O'Keeffe: Correspondence 1941–1949.

Chabot was instrumental in establishing the modern Santa Fe Indian Market. She worked for the New Mexico Association on Indian Affairs and the federal Office of Indian Affairs documenting Native American arts and crafts. Chabot has been described as "a photographer, writer, and explorer".

== Early life ==
Mary Lee "Maria" Chabot was born on September 19, 1913, in San Antonio, Texas, the daughter of Charles Jasper Chabot, a capitalist, and his third wife Olive Anderson Johnston. (Note: Her paternal grandfather, Charles Stooks Chabot, was a British consular agent or foreign service agent to Mexico. Upon leaving Mexico, he and his wife Mary Van Derlip Chabot moved to San Antonio, Texas, where he was a commission agent and she was a Spanish colonial art collector and an artist. Maria's father was born in Mexico.) Maria Chabot had three half-siblings who reached adulthood from her parents' previous marriages: Frederick Charles Chabot, Edith Lilian Chabot, and James Kennedy Johnston (the son from Olive's first marriage.) (Note: Frederick was the son of Charles and his first wife, Pauline Wachter Chabot, who died during childbirth. Edith Lilian Chabot was the daughter of Charles and his second wife, Lucille Branch Hugo Chabot. Charles Hugo Chabot was also a child from the second marriage. He and Lucille died in 1907 in a drowning accident. James Kennedy Johnston was the son of Olive and her first husband, James Kennedy Johnston.)

Chabot developed an interest in writing as a girl. After graduating early from Brackenridge high school, Chabot took a job as copywriter at a San Antonio department store and also wrote short stories. She continued to write fiction into the 1960s, but the short stories and novels were never published.

She traveled in 1933 to Mexico City to pursue her interests in literature and art and to visit a relative, Emily Edwards, who lived there at the time. There she met artist Dorothy Stewart.

== Dorothy Stewart ==
After Chabot and Stewart met, they began a romantic relationship. They traveled together extensively during the 1930s in Europe, Africa, and the Americas. Through Stewart, Chabot met many influential progressive people, including benefactor Mary Cabot Wheelwright, archaeologist Jesse L. Nusbaum, and Native American pottery expert Kenneth M. Chapman. Grace Guest, assistant curator of Freer Gallery of Art in Washington, D.C., became her friend. Although their romantic relationship ended in 1939, the women remained close friends until Stewart's death in 1955.

== Career ==
=== Advocate for Native Americans ===
In 1934, Chabot went with Stewart to Santa Fe, New Mexico, where she gained employment with the New Mexico Department of Vocational Education. She worked at the federal Indian Arts and Crafts Board in 1935. With these agencies and as part of a Works Progress Administration (WPA) initiative, she photographed and documented Spanish Colonial and Native American arts and crafts in the Southwest and territorial architecture in New Mexico. To complete her photographic survey, she traveled throughout the Southwestern United States in the 1930s and 1940s. She photographed the collection of Mary Cabot Wheelwright, who was a noted collector of Navajo art, now in the Wheelwright Museum of the American Indian. In the 1930s, Chabot published articles on Native American arts and crafts for New Mexico Magazine to inform potential buyers on how to identify valuable works of art.

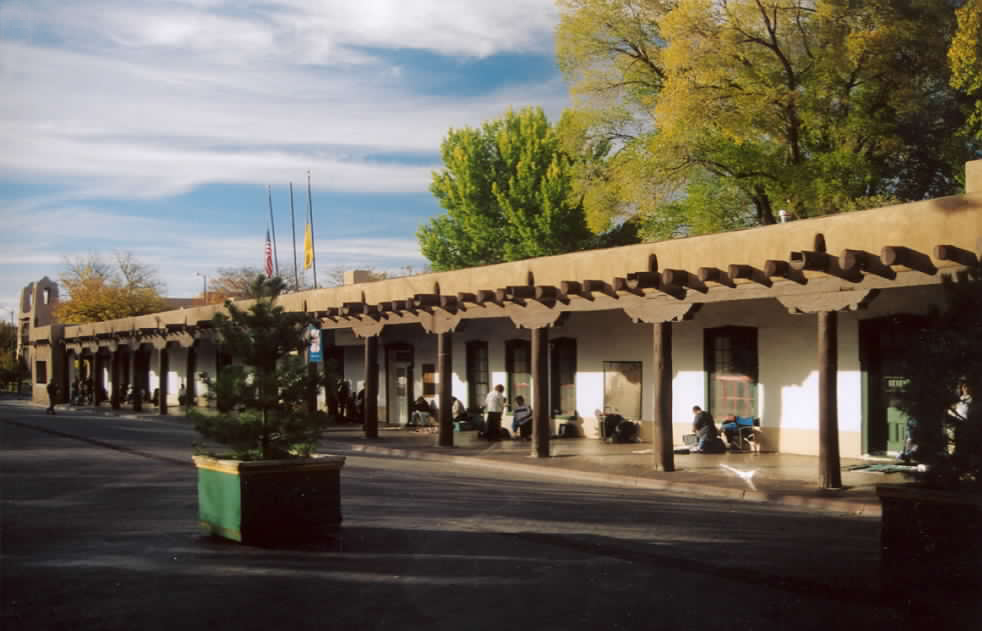
Palace of the Governors in Santa Fe, New Mexico

Chabot was made the executive secretary of the New Mexico Association on Indian Affairs in 1936. During that time, she came up with the idea for the Santa Fe Indian Market, modeled after the outdoor markets in Mexico, which she established despite initial opposition from local businesses. The market held weekly fairs at the Palace of the Governors and rented school buses to transport Native Americans to the markets where they could sell their jewelry, pottery, or other wares. She visited pueblos and encouraged artists to sell their works, including Maria Martinez, a potter of the San Ildefonso Pueblo. Later she worked at the federal Indian Arts and Crafts Board, where she established cooperative marketing organizations on reservations.

=== Rancher ===
Chabot lived on Mary Cabot Wheelwright's Los Luceros property in Alcalde, New Mexico, after the end of her relationship with Dorothy Stewart. (Note: Casa Grande is the 24-bedroom adobe mansion at Los Luceros. Cabot's residence was located across the road, but whenever Wheelwright was at Los Luceros, she would ask Chabot to stay with her at Casa Grande.) She served as a companion to Wheelwright and ran the cattle ranch, farm, and fruit tree orchard for 20 years, typically working in the fields with the men. During that period, she was president of the local irrigation association. When Wheelwright died in 1958, Chabot inherited Los Luceros but found it onerous to manage the property; she sold it to Charles and Nina Collier in the early 1960s. (Note: Charles Collier helped Georgia O'Keeffe find the hacienda in Abiquiú, New Mexico, that Chabot would restore.)

=== Georgia O'Keeffe ===
In 1940, Chabot met O'Keeffe, with whom she had a friendship that allowed for Chabot to write in a peaceful setting and for O'Keefe to spend part of the year in New York with her husband Alfred Stieglitz while Chabot took care of her property in New Mexico. From 1941 to 1944, Chabot spent the summer and fall of each year at O'Keeffe's house on the Ghost Ranch, where she managed the ranch. During the winter and spring, Chabot returned to San Antonio. She camped with O'Keeffe in northern New Mexico and was captured in Maria goes to a Party, one of O'Keeffe's paintings of their trips.

Beginning in 1945, Chabot led the restoration of an adobe hacienda (Georgia O'Keeffe Home and Studio) in Abiquiú for O'Keeffe, who oversaw the process. Chabot said of the experience, "I had never found anything as romantic as this beat-up building, a ruin really... It took six months just to get the pigs out of the house."

Chabot and O'Keeffe kept up an extensive correspondence. In her later years, Chabot assembled a manuscript containing her correspondence with O'Keeffe and photographs, but she did not complete the project in her lifetime. When she died, the materials were transferred to the Georgia O'Keeffe Museum Research Center. The book Maria Chabot—Georgia O'Keeffe: Correspondence 1941–1949 was published in 2004.

== Later years and death ==
In 1961, Chabot married Dana K. Bailey, a radio astronomer at the Los Alamos National Laboratory. The marriage lasted only six months; Chabot said, "we were much better as friends than as husband and wife." In the 1960s, she sold the ranch that she had inherited from Wheelwright and moved to Albuquerque, where she cared for her elderly mother.

Chabot was named a "Living Treasure" of Santa Fe in 1996. She died on July 9, 2001, at 87 years of age in an Albuquerque hospital.

== Bibliography ==
- O'Keeffe, Georgia (2003). Lynes, Barbara Buhler; Paden, Ann (eds.). Maria Chabot—Georgia O'Keeffe: correspondence, 1941–1949. Albuquerque: University of New Mexico Press; Santa Fe: Georgia O'Keeffe Museum. ISBN 978-0-8263-2993-6.
