= Teodoro Martinez House =

- U.S. National Register of Historic Places
- Location within New Mexico
- Nearest city: Los Ojos, New Mexico
- Coordinates: 36°43′22″N 106°34′42″W
- Area: less than one acre
- Built: c.1900
- MPS: La Tierra Amarilla MRA
- NRHP reference No.: 85000782
- Added to NRHP: April 4, 1985

The Teodoro Martinez House, near Los Ojos, New Mexico, was built around 1900. It was listed on the National Register of Historic Places in 1985. The listing included two contributing buildings.

It is located on La Puente Road (about 50 feet (15 m) off the east side of it) and about 150 yards (140 m) north of Hatchery Road, just above the drop-off from the first plateau to the river.

The house is significant as an "excellent, well-preserved example of local folk architecture."

A hewn horizontal log shed is the second historic structure of the property; its logs may have been obtained from Fort Lowell.
