= Sanchez-March House =

Historic house in Los Ojos, New Mexico, United States

- U.S. National Register of Historic Places
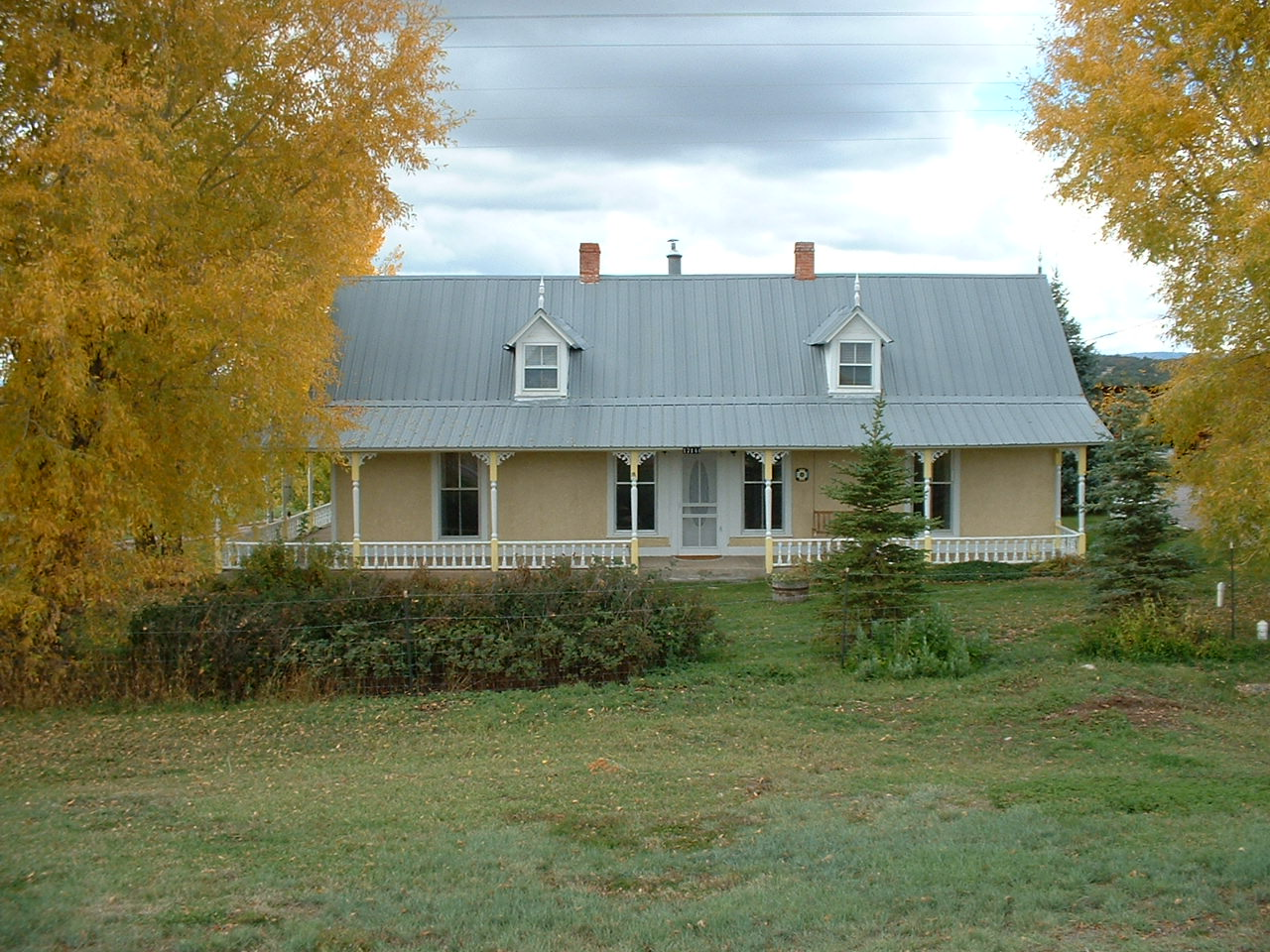
- Sanchez-March House, October 2005

- Location within New Mexico
- Nearest city: Los Ojos, New Mexico
- Coordinates: 36°44′23″N 106°34′09″W
- Area: less than one acre
- Built: c.1880
- MPS: La Tierra Amarilla MRA
- NRHP reference No.: 85000830
- Added to NRHP: April 4, 1985

The Sanchez-March House, is a historic house in Los Ojos, New Mexico, United States, that was built around 1880 and is listed on the National Register of Historic Places (NRHP).

== Description ==
The listing includes the house and two log barns, with a total of three contributing buildings. The house is 50 feet (15 m) west of U.S. Route 84 and 200 yards (180 m) north of New Mexico State Road 95.

It was deemed to be the best preserved of several "officer's plan" houses in the area, which by oral tradition were based on a type of officer's house used at Fort Lowell. The type introduced Anglo-American elements into the local architecture. It includes stock Queen Anne elements.

It is built with stucco and end boards over 18 inches (0.46 m) adobe walls and has a wraparound porch.

The house was listed on the NRHP April 4, 1985.

== See also ==
- National Register of Historic Places listings in Rio Arriba County, New Mexico
