= San Joaquin Church =

San Joaquin Church may refer to:

Philippines

- San Joaquin Church (Iloilo)

United States

- San Joaquin Church (Ensenada, New Mexico), listed on the National Register of Historic Places
