= Blanton Log House =

- U.S. National Register of Historic Places
- Location within New Mexico
- Nearest city: Los Ojos, New Mexico
- Coordinates: 36°43′11″N 106°34′51″W
- Area: less than one acre
- MPS: La Tierra Amarilla MRA
- NRHP reference No.: 85000778
- Added to NRHP: April 4, 1985

The Blanton Log House, in Rio Arriba County, New Mexico near Los Ojos, New Mexico, was listed on the National Register of Historic Places in 1985.

It is a 45 by 15 feet (13.7 m × 4.6 m) log house built with horizontal logs with some mud plaster. It has a very steep corrugated metal roof, and vertical planking in both of its gable ends. It has chamfered porch posts. A shed-roofed addition, about 20 by 10 feet (6.1 m × 3.0 m) on its southwest corner.

It was deemed significant as "a well-preserved, slightly-modified example of Hispanic log housing. The dovetail notching, half dovetail joints and steep roof are somewhat unusual. The linear, modular composition, multiple doors and gable doors are typical."

It was altered by an opening cut into one of its short ends so that it could be used as a garage.

It is located on the east side of La Puente Rd. about 250 yards (230 m) south of Hatchery Rd., just above the drop-off from the first plateau to the river.
