= Fort Lowell (Los Ojos, New Mexico) =

Former fort in New Mexico

Coordinates: 36°43′14″N 106°33′50″W

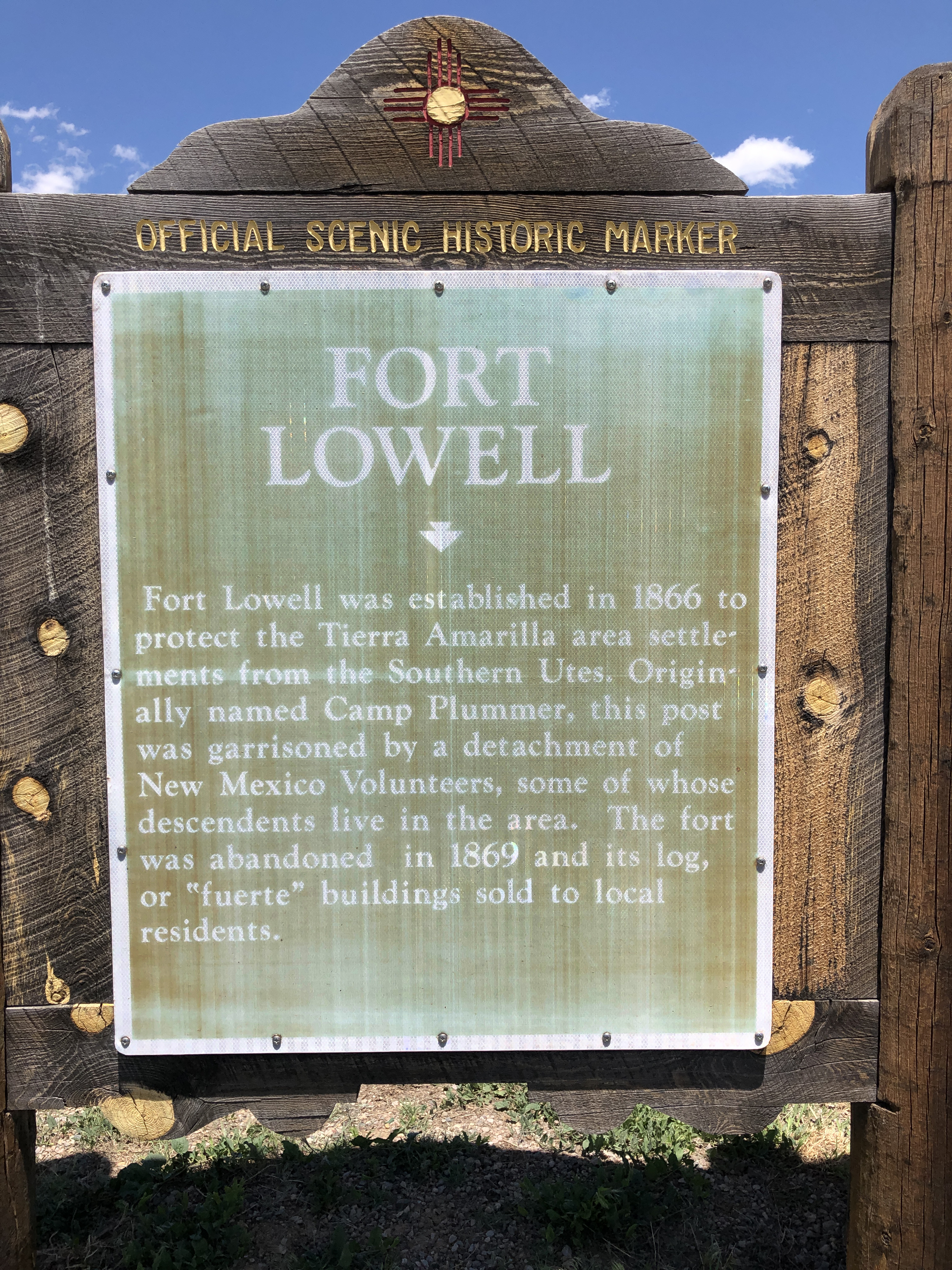
Fort Lowell, New Mexico roadside marker

The Fort Lowell in or near Los Ojos, New Mexico, was established in 1866 and operated until 1869. It protected settlements in the area of Tierra Amarilla from the Southern Utes. It was at first named Camp Plummer and was garrisoned by New Mexico volunteers, some of whose descendants remain in its area.

In 1869 it was abandoned and its log buildings were sold to local residents. Some of its lumber may have been salvaged for construction of the Gilbert Martinez Barn, which stands near its location.

== See also ==
- Fort Lowell
