= Santa Rosa de Lima (Abiquiu, New Mexico) =

Historic church in New Mexico, United States

- Santa Rosa de Lima de Abiquiu
- U.S. National Register of Historic Places
- NM State Register of Cultural Properties
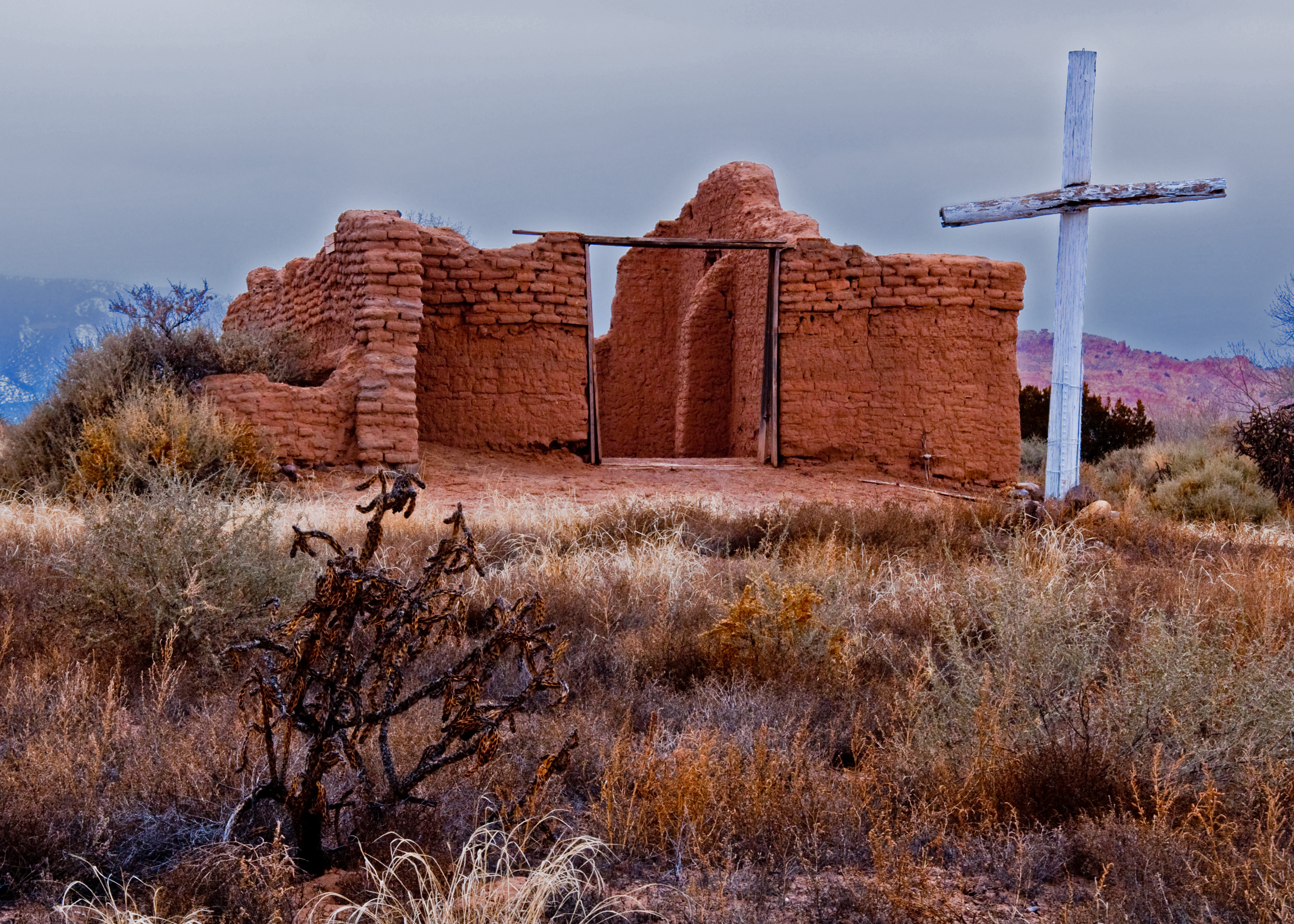
- Ruins of church, Santa Rosa de Lima. The church was still in use until the 1930s. 2010 photo.
- Nearest city: Abiquiú, New Mexico
- Area: 12.5 acres (5.1 ha)
- Built: 1734
- NRHP reference No.: 78001820
- NMSRCP No.: 118

Significant dates
- Added to NRHP: April 14, 1978
- Designated NMSRCP: September 12, 1969

Santa Rosa de Lima was an early 18th-century Spanish settlement in the Rio Chama valley, near the present-day town of Abiquiu in Rio Arriba County, New Mexico, United States

== Description ==
By the 1730s, Spanish settlers were moving into the Chama River valley, and by 1744 at least 20 families were living in the present-day Abiquiú area, where they founded the Plaza de Santa Rosa de Lima. The church, on the plaza, was built circa 1744, and was in use until the 1930s. Repeated raids by Utes and Comanches caused the settlement to be abandoned in 1747. In 1750, the Spanish founded a new settlement at the present site of Abiquiú, about a mile from Santa Rosa de Lima.

Today, the site of Santa Rosa de Lima is a ghost town, with substantial adobe ruins of the church, and mounds where the settlers' adobe houses stood. The site is private property, belonging to the Archdiocese of Santa Fe.

Santa Rosa de Lima de Abiquiu was added to the National Register of Historic Places in 1978, as listing #78001820.

== See also ==
- Province of Santa Fe de Nuevo México, New Spain
- National Register of Historic Places listings in Rio Arriba County, New Mexico
