= Fernando Trujillo Sr. House =

- U.S. National Register of Historic Places
- Nearest city: Los Ojos, New Mexico
- Coordinates: 36°44′32″N 106°34′09″W
- Area: less than one acre
- Built: 1880
- Architectural style: Anglo-Amer. Territorial
- MPS: La Tierra Amarilla MRA
- NRHP reference No.: 85000832
- Added to NRHP: April 4, 1985

The Fernando Trujillo Sr. House, near Los Ojos, New Mexico, was built around 1880. It was listed on the National Register of Historic Places in 1985.

The house is located 50 yards (46 m) west of U.S. Route 84 and 285 yards (261 m) north of county road 95 (or New Mexico State Road 95?).

It is Anglo-American Territorial in style.
