= El Barranco Community Ditch =

- U.S. National Register of Historic Places
- Location within New Mexico
- Location: Exdending from the Chama River at Chama Division to Upper Brazos Ditch, Los Brazos, New Mexico
- Coordinates: 36°46′35″N 106°33′51″W
- Area: 18.5 acres (7.5 ha)
- Architectural style: Irrigation ditch
- MPS: La Tierra Amarilla MRA
- NRHP reference No.: 86002296
- Added to NRHP: September 29, 1986

The El Barranco Community Ditch in Los Brazos, New Mexico is a 3.8 miles (6.1 km) long irrigation ditch diverting water from the Rio Chama. It was dug before 1907. It was listed on the National Register of Historic Places in 1986.

It extends from the Chama River at Chama Division to the Upper Brazos Ditch.
