= Georgia O'Keeffe Home and Studio =

Historic house in New Mexico, United States

- U.S. National Register of Historic Places
- U.S. National Historic Landmark
- NM State Register of Cultural Properties
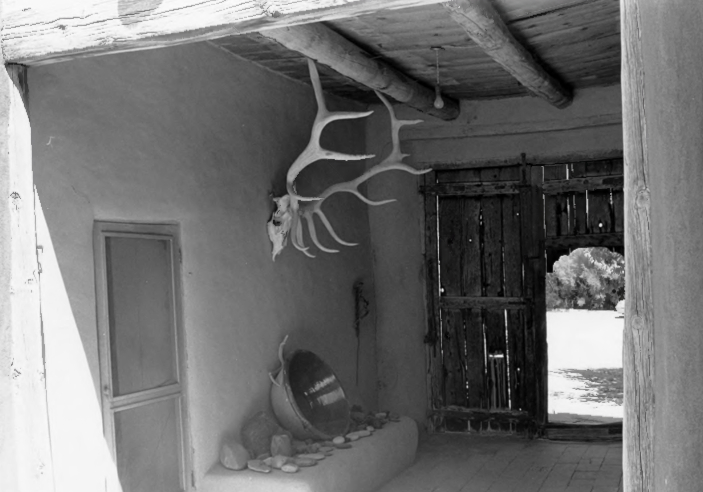
- Georgia O'Keeffe Home, zaguan

- Location within New Mexico Location within the United States
- Location: 12 Palvadera Rd., Abiquiú, New Mexico
- Coordinates: 36°12′29″N 106°19′1″W
- Area: 4 acres (1.6 ha)
- Built: 1949
- Architect: Maria Chabot, Georgia O'Keeffe
- Architectural style: Mission/Spanish Revival
- NRHP reference No.: 98001197
- NMSRCP No.: 1717

Significant dates
- Added to NRHP: August 5, 1998
- Designated NHL: August 5, 1998
- Designated NMSRCP: February 18, 2000

The Georgia O'Keeffe Home and Studio is a historic house museum in Abiquiú, New Mexico. From 1943 until her death, it was the principal residence and studio of artist Georgia O'Keeffe (1887–1986). (Note: In the heat of summer, she would move to cooler elevation on the nearby Ghost Ranch.) It is now part of the Georgia O'Keeffe Museum, which has sites in Santa Fe and Abiquiú. Public tours are available March–November, with advance tickets required. The Home and Studio became a National Historic Landmark in 1998, as one of the most important artistic sites in the southwestern United States.

== Description and history ==
The Georgia O'Keeffe Home and Studio is located in the small unincorporated village of Abiquiú, near the St. Thomas Church. The building is a single-story adobe structure, largely built in the traditional style. It has thick adobe walls, and a flat roof supported by a network of vigas and latillas (smaller wooden elements crossing the larger viga beams). The house is organized in wings a single room deep, which surround a central patio/plaza. The house has a number of modernist elements, including skylights and large picture windows that provide expansive views of the surrounding landscape and brought natural light into areas that such houses traditionally did not have. O'Keeffe was insistent on these types of deviations from the traditional form, stating in an interview that "I didn't want a Spanish house; I didn't want an Indian house, [or] a Mexican house; I wanted my house!"

Portions of the house are believed to date to the 1730s, and it was in deteriorating condition when Georgia O'Keeffe first spotted it in the 1930s. At the time, it was owned by the Roman Catholic church, which did not want to sell it. It eventually relented, and O'Keeffe was able to purchase it in 1943. She undertook to rehabilitate and modernize the property, work that was a collaborative effort with her friend Maria Chabot. This work was completed in 1946, at which time O'Keeffe made it her permanent home. Included in the compound is a smaller outbuilding which was her principal studio space.

The house remained O'Keeffe's primary residence until 1984, when she moved to Santa Fe two years prior to her death at age 98. In 1989, the Georgia O'Keeffe Foundation became owner and manager of the Abiquiú property. It is now owned and managed by the Georgia O'Keeffe Museum.

The property was declared a National Historic Landmark in 1998.

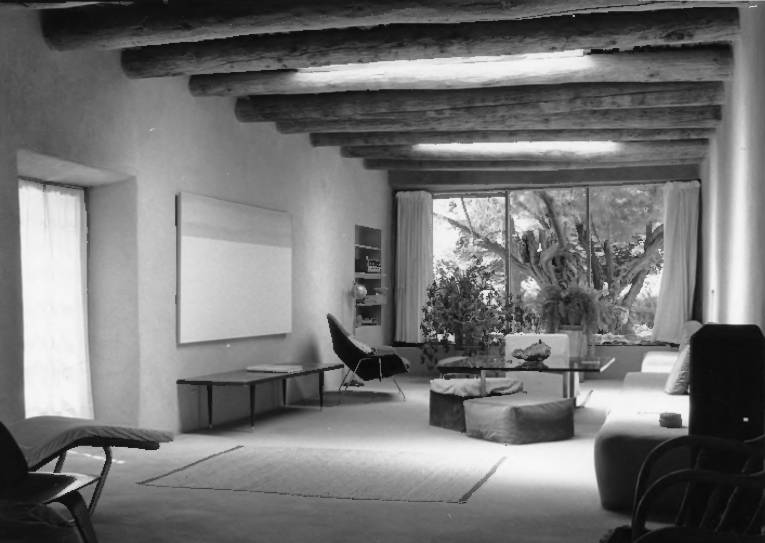
Georgia O'Keeffe Home, sitting room, looking into garden. 1996 photo.

== See also ==
- Ghost Ranch, where O'Keeffe also owned property
- National Register of Historic Places in Rio Arriba County, New Mexico
- List of National Historic Landmarks in New Mexico
- List of single-artist museums
