= Gilbert Martinez Barn =

- U.S. National Register of Historic Places
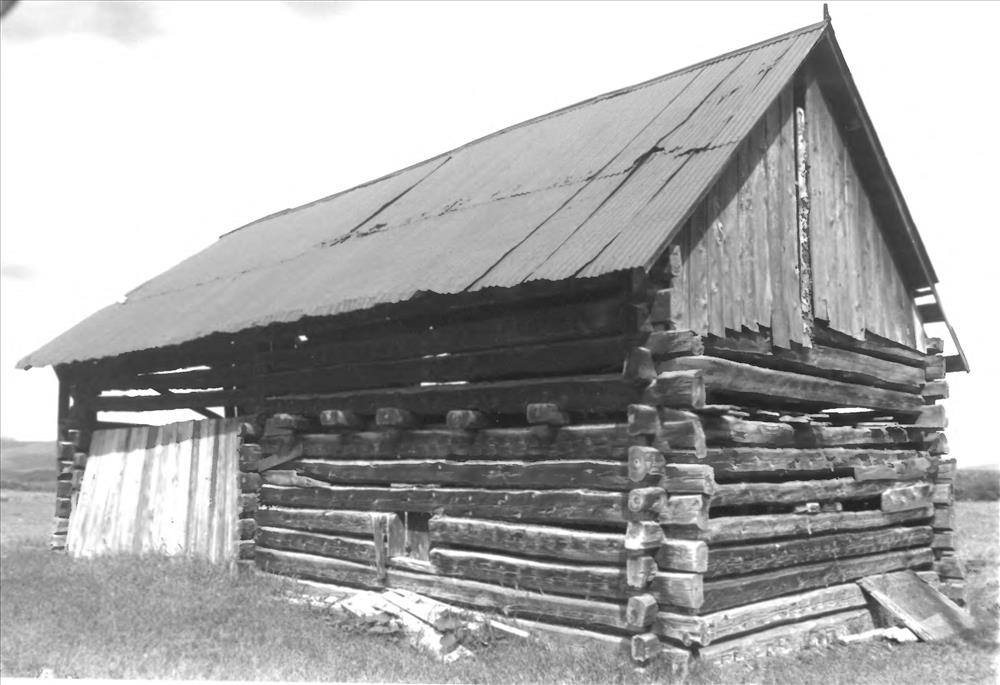
- Gilbert Martinez Barn, Los Ojos, NM

- Location within New Mexico
- Nearest city: Los Ojos, New Mexico
- Coordinates: 36°43′17″N 106°34′44″W
- Area: less than one acre
- Built: c.1875
- MPS: La Tierra Amarilla MRA
- NRHP reference No.: 85000781
- Added to NRHP: April 4, 1985

The Gilbert Martinez Barn near Los Ojos, New Mexico was built around 1875. It was listed on the National Register of Historic Places in 1985.

It is located about 50 feet (15 m) east of La Puente Rd and 80 yards (73 m) south of Hatchery Rd., just above the dropoff from the first plateau to the river. It is a hewn horizontal log barn with double box notching, with a corrugated metal roof and vertical planks in its gable end.

It is significant as a "little-modified, traditional Hispanic barn, constructed about 1875. The extensive use of hewn logs, even for the loft cross beams and attic walls, suggests that they are reused from Fort Lowell which stood nearby. A tree ring sample has been taken and the building may well prove pivotal in the chronology of local log construction and in the introduction of the attic wall."

== Structure ==
The barn does not have a foundation. The walls are constructed from hewn logs that are assembled using a double box notch technique. The roof has gable ends and is covered with corrugated metal. The barn is primarily made of hewn logs, including the attic walls and the loft cross beams.
