= Samuel Sanchez House =

- U.S. National Register of Historic Places
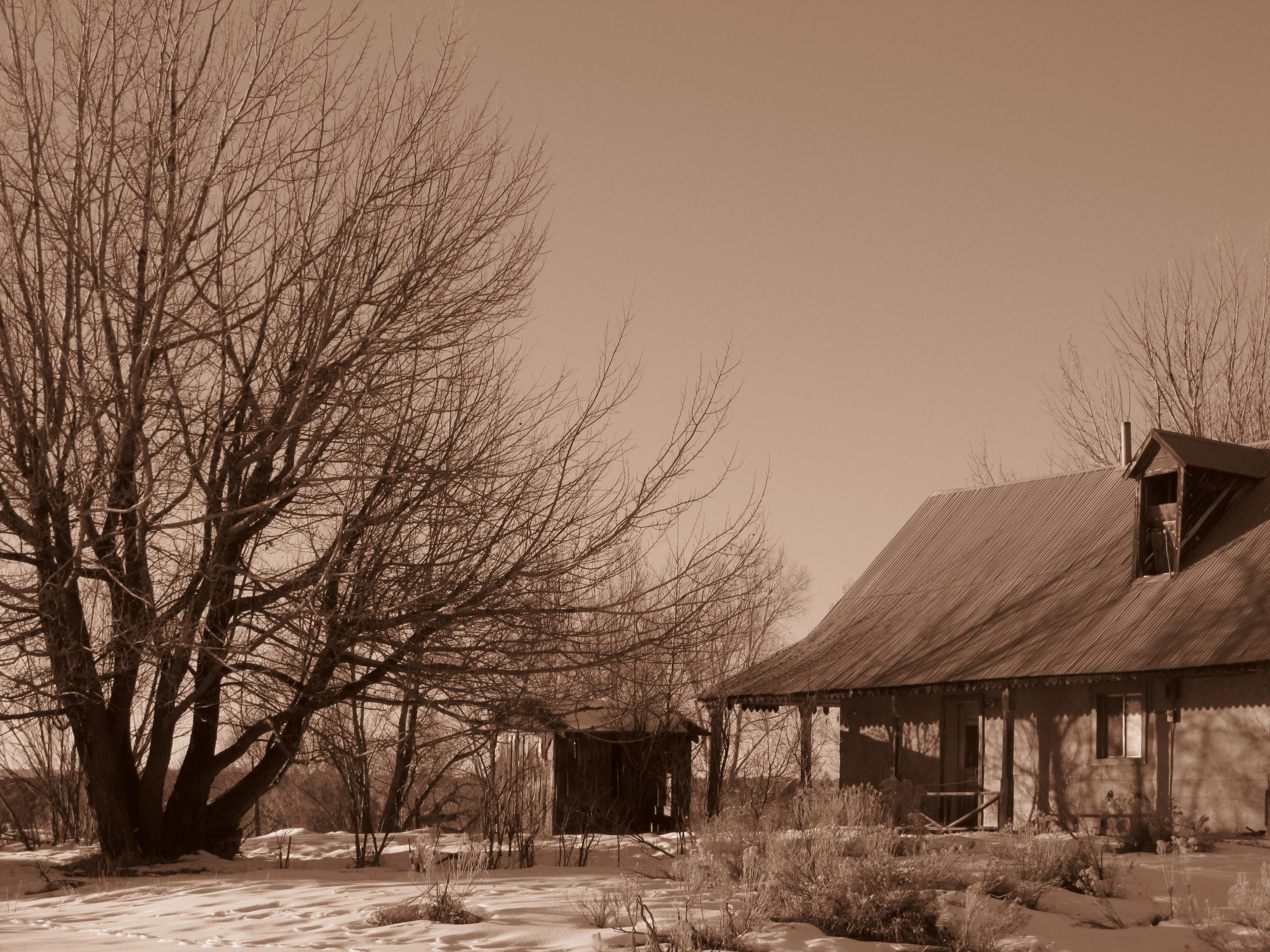

- Location within New Mexico
- Nearest city: Los Brazos, New Mexico
- Coordinates: 36.766273°N 106.559414°W
- Area: 0.3 acres (0.12 ha)
- Built: c.1885
- Architectural style: Folk Territorial Style
- MPS: La Tierra Amarilla MRA
- NRHP reference No.: 86002315
- Added to NRHP: September 29, 1986

The Samuel Sanchez House, on the Sanchez Ranch near Los Brazos, New Mexico, was built in the 1880s. Now located off U.S. Route 64, it was listed on the National Register of Historic Places in 1986.

It was built in Folk Territorial Style. It is a stucco over adobe building, with a wood shingle roof and brickwork chimneys. It has lathed porch posts and engaged columns with brackets.
