= Burns Lake Bungalow =

- U.S. National Register of Historic Places
- Location within New Mexico Location within the United States
- Location: 1/2 mile south of the eastern end of Hatchery Rd., near Los Ojos, New Mexico
- Coordinates: 36°42′52″N 106°34′55″W
- Area: less than one acre
- Built: 1932
- Built by: Works Progress Administration
- MPS: La Tierra Amarilla MRA
- NRHP reference No.: 85000780
- Added to NRHP: April 4, 1985

The Burns Lake Bungalow, near Los Ojos, New Mexico, was built in 1932. It was listed on the National Register of Historic Places in 1985.

It built as a part of the 1932-34 Works Progress Administration project to make a hatchery.
