= Casados House =

- U.S. National Register of Historic Places
- Location within New Mexico
- Nearest city: Los Ojos, New Mexico
- Coordinates: 36°44′20″N 106°34′10″W
- Area: less than one acre
- Built: 1885
- MPS: La Tierra Amarilla MRA
- NRHP reference No.: 85000825
- Added to NRHP: April 4, 1985

The Casados House, in Rio Arriba County, New Mexico near Los Ojos, New Mexico, was built in 1885. It was listed on the National Register of Historic Places in 1985.

It is located about 100 yards (91 m) northwest of the junction of U.S. Route 84 and New Mexico State Road 95.

It is a two-story "mansion" built with 20 inches (0.51 m) adobe walls upon a stone rubble foundation.

"7. Description; Stone rubble foundation, stucco and mud plaster over 20" adobe walls, end boards-front; asphalt shingles over hipped roof; small enclosed overhang; 1/6, 2/2 double hung windows with segmental arched molding pediments; single door with transom; boxed chamfered porch posts with spindle railings and stick/cut-out frieze. Front and side facades symmetrical. Center hall flanked by load bearing adobe walls and two pairs of rooms on both floors Barn, ca. 50' SW: hewn horizontal log with alternating half dovetail joint (1st floor), plank with corrugated metal roof (2nd floor), small railroad tie addition. Located just above the drop-off from the first plateau to the river, in the vicinity of mobile homes, recent houses and a scattering of historic buildings (see #52)."

"8. Significance; This is the best preserved of the two-story mansions remaining in the survey area; another stands in ruins (ill. 55), two more in Tierra Amarilla outside the survey area. Built in the mid-1880s by Hispanic merchants who had prospered with the coming of the railroad, these represent an adoption of Anglo-American tastes and house design on the most refined and grand scale affordable. This house, like the others, has an overriding symmetry of massing, full front porch, centered entrance and center hall plan with four matching square rooms on each floor. The doors, windows and balustrades are stock elements shipped in over the railroad. The segmental molding window pediments, the stick and cut-out friezes, the boxed chamfered posts and the concentration of those posts to mark the centered entrance show the hand of a local builder."

A barn, also built around 1885, is a second contributing building in the listing, and is "a good example of the typical combination of Hispanic (hewn logs) with Anglo (plank and corrugated roofing) elements in local barns."
