= Canjilon, New Mexico =

- Census-designated place
- Location within New Mexico
- Coordinates: 36°29′42″N 106°25′55″W
- Country: United States
- State: New Mexico
- County: Rio Arriba

Area
  - Total: 3.21 sq mi (8.31 km^{2})
  - Land: 3.21 sq mi (8.31 km^{2})
  - Water: 0 sq mi (0.00 km^{2})
- Elevation: 7,832 ft (2,387 m)

Population (2020)
  - Total: 228
  - Density: 71.1/sq mi (27.44/km^{2})
- Time zone: UTC-7 (Mountain (MST))
  - Summer (DST): UTC-6 (MDT)
- ZIP code: 87515
- Area code: 575
- GNIS feature ID: 2584063

Canjilon is a census-designated place in Rio Arriba County, New Mexico, United States. As of the 2020 census, Canjilon had a population of 228. Canjilon has a post office, which opened in 1892, with the ZIP code 87515. The community is located along New Mexico State Road 115. Canjilon was first settled in 1870, and by 1880, 35 families lived there.

== Demographics ==
Historical population
Census	Pop.	Note	%±
2020	228		—
U.S. Decennial Census

== Education ==
It is within the Chama Valley Independent Schools school district.
