= Manuelita Trujillo House =

- U.S. National Register of Historic Places
- Location within New Mexico
- Nearest city: Los Ojos, New Mexico
- Coordinates: 36°44′46″N 106°34′04″W
- Area: less than one acre
- MPS: La Tierra Amarilla MRA
- NRHP reference No.: 85000831
- Added to NRHP: April 4, 1985

The Manuelita Trujillo House, near Los Ojos, New Mexico, was listed on the National Register of Historic Places in 1985.

It is located 20 yards (18 m) west of U.S. Route 84 and 200 yards (180 m)south of the Los Brazos River.

The building has stucco over 20 inches (0.51 m) adobe walls. It was deemed notable as "a little-modified, good example of the local folk building tradition at the turn of the century. The L-shaped composition of rooms as discrete units, each with its own door (and probably built in phases) and the use of adobe come from the Hispanic roots of the tradition. The orientation towards the street, gabled roof and chamfered porch post are Anglo-American introductions. The wrap-around front porch, too, is an Anglo introduction, but used in Hispanic fashion for exterior circulation."
