= Mary Cabot Wheelwright =

American anthropologist

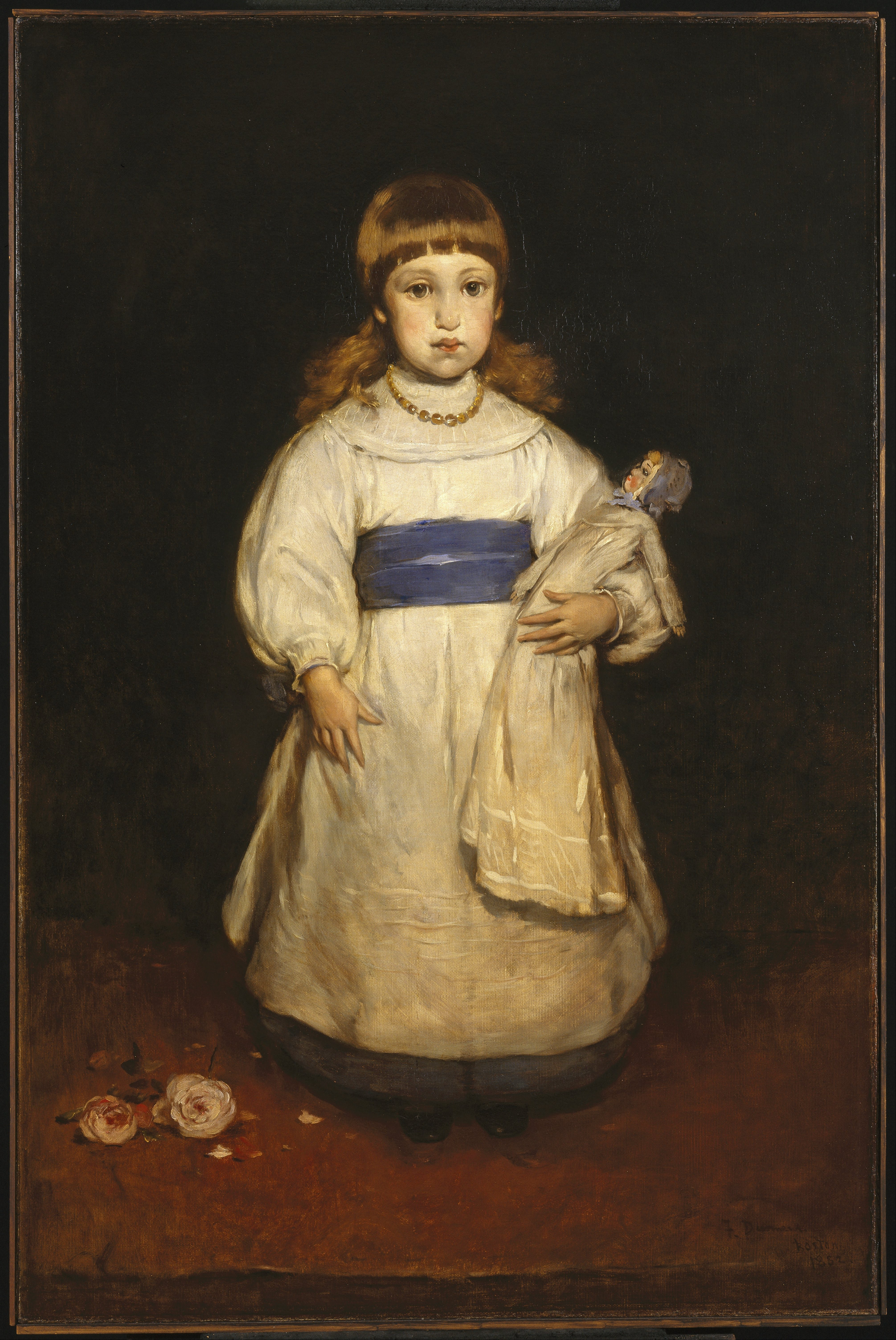
- A portrait of Wheelwright at age four, painted by American artist Frank Duveneck
- Born: October 2, 1878
- Died: July 29, 1958 (aged 79)
- Occupations: anthropologist and museum founder

Mary Cabot Wheelwright (October 2, 1878 – July 29, 1958) was an American anthropologist and museum founder. She established the museum which is now called Wheelwright Museum of the American Indian, in 1937 along with Hosteen Klah.

== Early life and family ==
Wheelwright was born on October 2, 1878, the only child of Andrew Cunningham Wheelwright and Sarah ("Sadie") Perkins Cabot Wheelwright. She was raised in a wealthy household and the Cabot family was part of the Boston upper class. Her family traced its ancestry to 18th-century merchants who had become wealthy through shipping. Her great-grandfathers worked as commission agents and her maternal grandfather made his wealth through "slavery, sugar, and rum," also building China's first trading outpost, where he imported silks and opium. Mary's mother, Sarah, was close friends with Ralph Waldo Emerson, who often visited the family's home. As a child, Wheelwright was raised in the tradition of the Transcendentalists and the Unitarian Church. In 1882, at the age of four years old, she posed for a portrait by artist Frank Duveneck. She was well-traveled, visiting Europe, Egypt, and California with her parents, who were "protective" and raised Wheelwright as how a friend described as "growing up in cotton wool."

For 40 years, Wheelwright remained the "dutiful Victorian daughter." She devoted herself to "good works, particularly a settlement-house music school in the South End of Boston." As the heiress of a family trust, she had significant income that would support her throughout her life but lacked control of the capital, which was intended to protect her from "fortune-hunting suitors" but made her unable to endow the museum she would later found as she wished.

== Life and work in the American Southwest ==
At age 40, after both her parents had died, Wheelwright journeyed to the American Southwest, where she "found and embraced a more primitive type of civilization, more adventuresome and more exciting than the safety of Boston." In Alcalde, New Mexico, she stayed on a ranch. In addition, she traveled to the Four Corners region and Navajo reservation. There, she developed an interest in Navajo religion. In 1921, Wheelwright was introduced to Hosteen Klah, a Navajo medicine man and singer, who was worried about preserving traditional Navajo religious practices. The two developed a friendship and began working together to preserve Navajo religious practices, with Klah sharing details about Navajo ceremonies with Wheelwright, who recorded and translated them. While at the time, there was a taboo in the Navajo community against replicating ceremonies, Klah's fear of the knowledge of their culture's traditions being lost led them to share the information with Wheelwright.

Throughout the next years, Wheelwright spent time traveling the world, living in the eastern United States, and living in Alcalde. In 1940, she traveled to India with the goal of finding symbols related to the ones found in Navajo art. She also visited Europe, Greece, Egypt, and China. She continued to record information about Navajo ceremonials given by Klah and by another 58 medicine men, and collected reproductions of ceremonial sandpaintings in various media.

In 1923, Wheelwright purchased the Los Luceros Ranch near Alcalde. She befriended Maria Chabot, who managed the ranch for 20 years, and later gifted the ranch to Chabot.

In 1937, Wheelwright and Klah established the House of Navajo Religion in Santa Fe. The name was later changed to the Museum of Navajo Ceremonial Art in 1939. In 1942 the museum published Navajo Creation Myth - the Story of the Emergence by Hosteen Klah, Recorded by Mary C. Wheelwright. In 1977, the museum was renamed the Wheelwright Museum of the American Indian.

Wheelwright wrote an autobiography, titled Journey Towards Understanding, in 1957. Ultimately, it went unpublished during her lifetime. An excerpt was published in A Quilt of Words: Women's Diaries, Letters & Original Accounts of Life in the Southwest, 1860–1960 in 1988.

In addition to traveling, Wheelwright enjoyed sailing. She spent summers on the coast of Maine and lived alone for a time in a shipmaster's cottage on Sutton Island.

== Later life and death ==
Wheelwright continued to serve as director of the museum for the rest of her life. She died on July 29, 1958 at the age of 79 in her home in Maine.

== Bibliography ==
=== Archival collections ===
- Mary C. Wheelwright Autobiography and Related Materials, 1979–1992, MS 1-1-128a, Wheelwright Museum of the American Indian in Santa Fe, NM. Archival collection finding aid https://rmoa.unm.edu/docviewer.php?docId=nmu1mss773sc.xml#idp97728

=== Primary works ===
- Klah, Hosteen and Wheelwright, Mary C. Navajo Creation Myth - the Story of the Emergence Santa Fe, N.M.: Museum of Navajo Ceremonial Art, 1942. Print. Navajo religion series, vol. I.
- Wheelwright, Mary C. Hail Chant and Water Chant. Santa Fe, N.M.: Museum of Navajo ceremonial art, 1946. Print. Navajo religion series, vol. II.
- Wheelwright, Mary C., Yoh Hatráli., and Beyal. Begay. Eagle Catching Myth. [Rev. ed.]. Santa Fe, N.M.: Museum of Navajo Ceremonial Art, 1962. Print. Santa Fe (N.M.). Museum of Navajo Ceremonial Art. Bulletin, no. 3 (1962); Santa Fe (N.M.), no. 3 (1962).

=== Secondary works ===
- Poling-Kempes, Lesley. Ladies of the Canyons : A League of Extraordinary Women and Their Adventures in the American Southwest. Tucson: The University of Arizona Press, 2015. ISBN 9780816524945
