= San Joaquin Church (Ensenada, New Mexico) =

Historic church in New Mexico, United States

- U.S. National Register of Historic Places
- NM State Register of Cultural Properties
- Location within New Mexico
- Location: NM 162, Ensenada, New Mexico
- Coordinates: 36°43′34″N 106°32′01″W
- Area: 0.2 acres (0.081 ha)
- Built: 1915
- Architectural style: Gothic, Vernacular Gothic Revival
- MPS: La Tierra Amarilla MRA
- NRHP reference No.: 86002310
- NMSRCP No.: 1221

Significant dates
- Added to NRHP: September 29, 1986
- Designated NMSRCP: February 28, 1986

The San Joaquin Church is a historic church on State Road 162 in Ensenada, New Mexico. It was built in 1915 and added to the National Register of Historic Places in 1986.

It is a stucco-covered adobe with a corrugated roof and shuttered gothic windows.

== See also ==
- National Register of Historic Places listings in Rio Arriba County, New Mexico
