= Chama Valley Independent Schools =

School district in New Mexico, United States

Chama Valley Independent School District 19 (CVISD), also known as Chama Valley Independent Schools, is a school district headquartered on the property of Escalante Middle/High School in Tierra Amarilla, New Mexico.

Its boundary includes Tierra Amarilla, Brazos, Canjilon, Chama, Ensenada, and Los Ojos.

== History ==
Anthony Casados became the superintendent in 2010.

== Schools ==
- Escalante Middle/High School - Tierra Amarilla
  - The American football stadium, with a cost of $2,600,000, was built in 2015.
- Chama Middle/Elementary School (K-8 school) - Chama
- Tierra Amarilla Elementary School - Tierra Amarilla

Previously Escalante High School and Tierra Amarilla Middle School were two separate institutions.
