= Miguel Valdez Barn =

- U.S. National Register of Historic Places
- Location within New Mexico
- Location: San Joaquin Church Loop Rd., Ensenada, New Mexico
- Coordinates: 36°43′31″N 106°31′45″W
- Area: 0.1 acres (0.040 ha)
- Built: 1920s
- MPS: La Tierra Amarilla MRA
- NRHP reference No.: 86002314
- Added to NRHP: September 29, 1986

The Miguel Valdez Barn, on San Joaquin Church Loop Rd. in Ensenada, New Mexico, was likely built in the 1920s. It was listed on the National Register of Historic Places in 1986.

In 1985 it consisted of "three rectangular modules of horizontal logs with double saddle notches; spanned by log beams; covered by planks covered with hay. Double post and rail corral extends c. 20 feet in front (NE) of barn. Located in a field east of Ensenada near the southeast corner of the village's irrigated fields." It was deemed significant as "one of the best local examples of Hispanic modular barn construction. It is one of the few shed-roofed barns in the area; most have received gabled metal roofs against the heavy winter snows."
