= Tomas Gonzales House =

- U.S. National Register of Historic Places
- Location within New Mexico
- Location: County Road 155, 2 miles east of its junction with U.S. Route 84, near Abiquiu, New Mexico
- Coordinates: 36°13′18″N 106°18′16″W
- Area: less than one acre
- Built: 1895
- Architectural style: I-house
- NRHP reference No.: 96000258
- Added to NRHP: March 14, 1996

The Tomas Gonzales House, near Abiquiu, New Mexico, United States, was built in 1895. It was listed on the National Register of Historic Places in 1996. It has also been known as Mormon House and as Goad Place.

It is a two-story building constructed of baked adobe bricks.
