= San Gabriel de Yungue-Ouinge =

- U.S. National Register of Historic Places
- U.S. National Historic Landmark
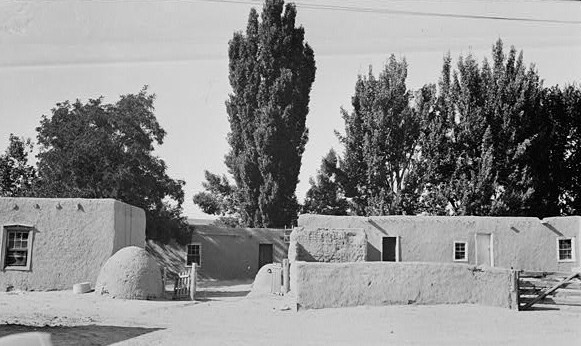
- HABS photo of the site, 1936

- Location within New Mexico Location within the United States
- Nearest city: Española, New Mexico
- Coordinates: 36°3′26″N 106°5′1″W
- Area: 4 acres (1.6 ha)
- Built: 1598
- NRHP reference No.: 66000482

Significant dates
- Added to NRHP: October 15, 1966
- Designated NHL: July 19, 1964

San Gabriel de Yungue-Ouinge, or San Gabriel de Yunque, was the site of the first Spanish capital of its provincial territory of Santa Fe de Nuevo México. It is located where the Rio Chama meets the Rio Grande, west of present-day Ohkay Owingeh, New Mexico. The pueblo of Yuque Yunque was taken by Juan de Oñate, and he founded his colonial government there. It was moved to Santa Fe in 1610. The site was declared a National Historic Landmark in 1964. The archaeological site was leveled and plowed over in 1984, and a historical marker has been placed on the west side of the Rio Grande, off the old New Mexico State Road 74.

== Description and history ==
The pueblos of Ohkay and Yúngéh were two interrelated Puebloan settlements, with Ohkay's establishment estimated around 1200 and Yúngéh's around 1300. The present-day tribal lands of Ohkay Owingeh encompass the area of both settlements. When Juan de Oñate arrived in 1598 to establish a Spanish provincial headquarters, he at first established a military camp outside the Ohkay pueblo, which he dubbed "San Juan" (a name by which the Ohkay pueblo was known for many years, before reclaiming its native name in the early 21st century.) The Puebloans agreed to make the Yúngéh pueblo, located between the Chama River and Rio Grande, available as a compound for the Spanish, and its residents were evacuated to Ohkay. In the fall of 1598, the Spanish erected a church and dug an acequia (water channel) to bring water to Yunque.

The site remained New Mexico's colonial capital until 1610, when Oñate was replaced by Pedro de Peralta, who established the Spanish capital at Santa Fe. Yunque was either abandoned entirely by the Spanish, or left with a few colonists, but it was eventually abandoned entirely.

The location of this early colonial capital was of recurring interest to historians, and was tentatively identified in the 1890s. In the 1930s, the National Park Service surveyed the area but was unable to make a definitive determination. Excavations in the 1940s and 1960s made it abundantly clear that the area was an early Spanish settlement site, with the church site and a military barracks among the structures whose remains were found. After these excavations, the natives began removing adobe bricks from the ruins for reuse, and the site was levelled and buried. A cross and memorial marker indicate the site.

== See also ==
- National Register of Historic Places listings in Rio Arriba County, New Mexico
- List of National Historic Landmarks in New Mexico
