= Los Brazos Historic District =

Historic district in Brazos, New Mexico, United States

- U.S. National Register of Historic Places
- Location within New Mexico
- Nearest city: Brazos, New Mexico
- Coordinates: 36°45′06″N 106°33′38″W
- Area: 32 acres (13 ha)
- Architectural style: Folk Territorial
- MPS: La Tierra Amarilla MRA
- NRHP reference No.: 85000827
- Added to NRHP: April 4, 1985

The Los Brazos Historic District is a historic district in Brazos, New Mexico, United States, that is listed on the National Register of Historic Places (NRHP).

== Description ==
The listing included 35 contributing buildings on 32 acres (13 ha) and is described as follows:

Roughly bounded by U.S. Route 84, North Rd., fence line and drop-off to Rio Brazos
Architecture: Folk Territorial
Historic subfunction: Single Dwelling; Agricultural Outbuildings; Secondary Structure
Criteria: architecture/engineering, architecture/engineering[2]

The district was listed on the NRHP April 4, 1985

== See also ==
- National Register of Historic Places listings in Rio Arriba County, New Mexico
