= Tony Manzanares House =

- U.S. National Register of Historic Places
- Location within New Mexico
- Location: East of Los Ojos Rd. and north of La Puente Church, near Los Ojos, New Mexico
- Coordinates: 36°42′25″N 106°35′50″W
- Area: less than one acre
- Built: 1930
- MPS: La Tierra Amarilla MRA
- NRHP reference No.: 85000829
- Added to NRHP: April 4, 1985

The Tony Manzanares House, near Los Ojos, New Mexico, was built in 1930. It was listed on the National Register of Historic Places in 1985.

It is located 30 feet (9.1 m) east of the Los Ojos Road and 0.3 miles (0.48 km) north of La Puente Church, just above the first dropoff from the river.

Its main section is built of hewn horizontal logs and mud plaster, with end notching of the logs; a rear addition uses jacal.
