= Chimayo Trading Post and E.D. Trujillo House =

- U.S. National Register of Historic Places
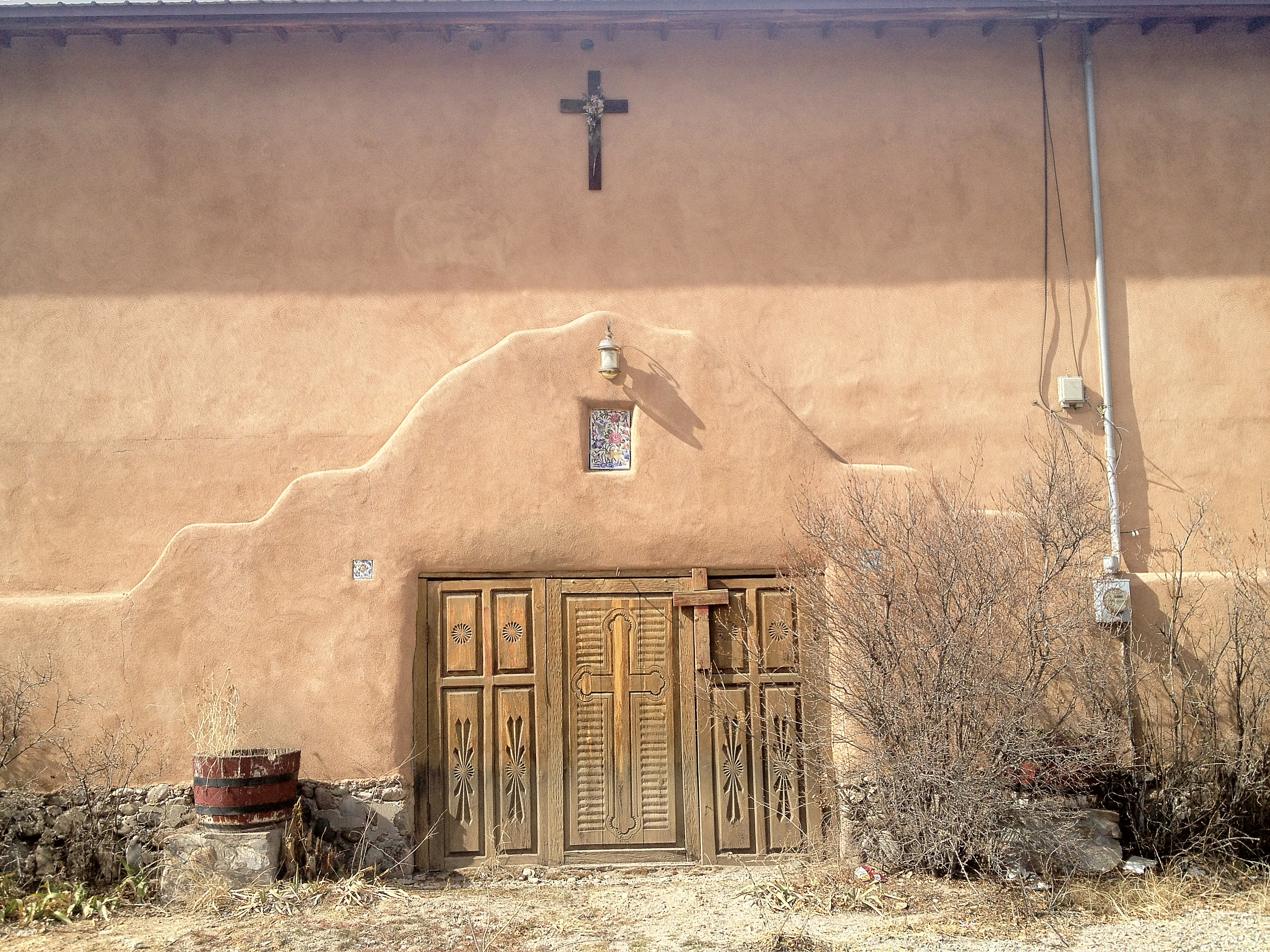

- Location within New Mexico
- Location: 110 Sandia Dr., Espanola, New Mexico
- Coordinates: 35°59′28″N 106°04′04″W
- Area: less than one acre
- Built: 1939
- Architectural style: Pueblo
- NRHP reference No.: 99000500
- Added to NRHP: May 13, 1999

The Chimayo Trading Post and E.D. Trujillo House, at 110 Sandia Dr. in Espanola, New Mexico, was built in 1939. It was listed on the National Register of Historic Places in 1999.

It has also been known as "The Original" Chimayo Trading Post.
