= Foster Hotel =

- U.S. National Register of Historic Places
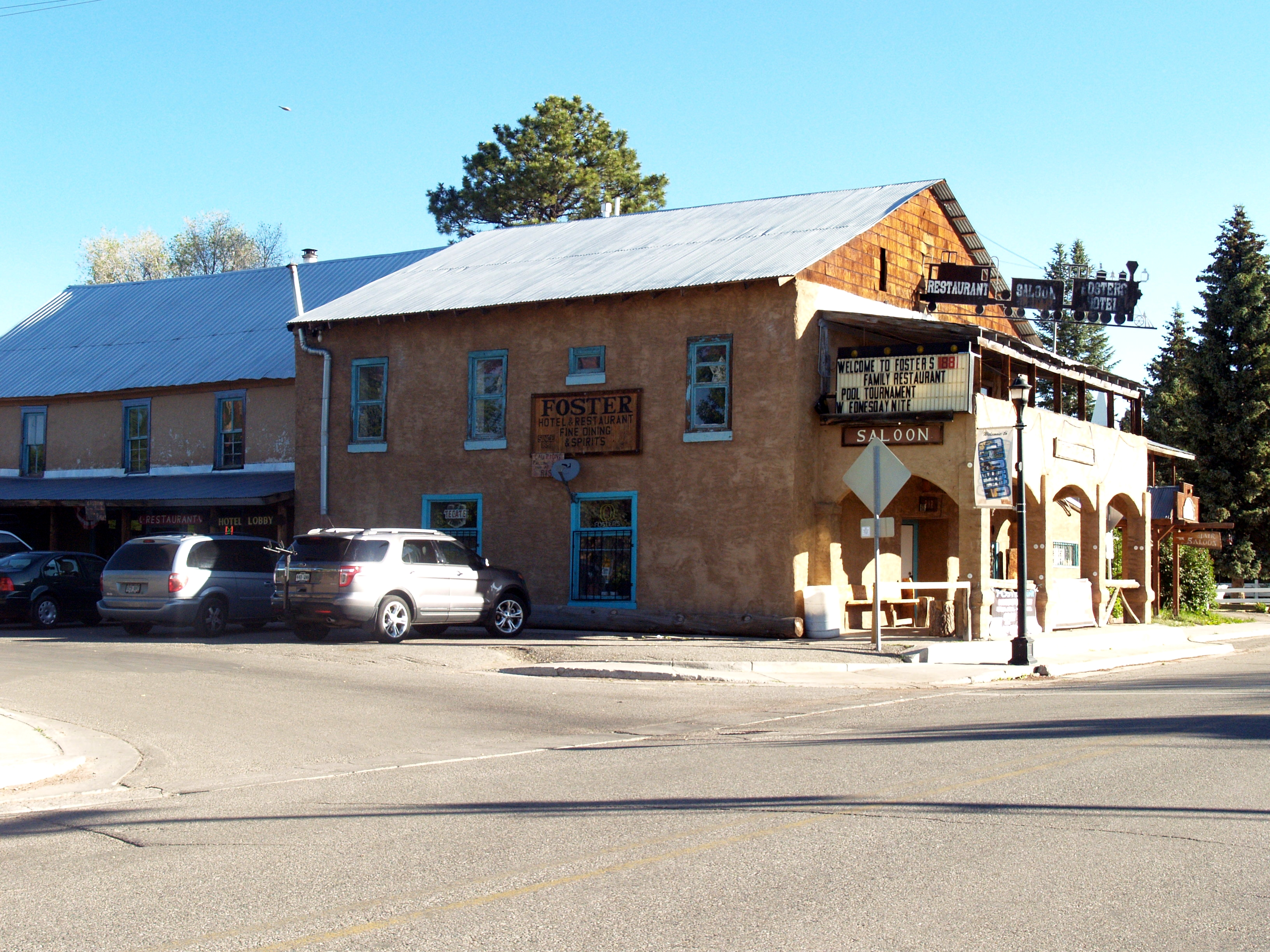

- Location within New Mexico Location within the United States
- Location: Fourth and Terrace, Chama, New Mexico
- Coordinates: 36°54′15″N 106°34′42″W
- Area: 0.1 acres (0.040 ha)
- Built: c. 1881, c. 1927
- Architectural style: Vernacular New Mexico Style
- NRHP reference No.: 86000225
- Added to NRHP: February 13, 1986

The Foster Hotel, at Fourth and Terrace in Chama, New Mexico, was built around 1881 and expanded twice later. It was listed on the National Register of Historic Places in 1986.

The original 1881 building is a wood-frame two-story structure, built to meet demand related to Denver and Rio Grande Railroad construction. The second stage, also two-story, added around 1927, is cement stucco over adobe. The third stage, added in 1932, was cement stucco over wood-frame construction.

It is significant as one of the first commercial buildings in Chama, and as the only commercial building which survived several fires in the town.
