= Counselor, New Mexico =

Counselor, New Mexico Bilagáana Nééz (Navajo)
- Unincorporated community
- Location within New Mexico
- Coordinates: 36°12′33″N 107°27′28″W
- Country: United States
- State: New Mexico
- County: Sandoval
- Elevation: 7,027 ft (2,142 m)
- Time zone: UTC-7 (Mountain (MST))
  - Summer (DST): UTC-6 (MDT)
- ZIP code: 87018
- Area code: 505
- GNIS feature ID: 902808

Counselor (Navajo: Bilagáana Nééz) is an unincorporated community in Sandoval County, New Mexico, United States. Counselor is located at the junction of U.S. Route 550 and New Mexico State Road 403. It is a chapter of the Navajo Nation. It is named after Jim Counselor, who traded in the area in the first decades of the 20th century.

== Education ==
It is in Cuba Independent Schools.
