= La Puente Community Ditch =

Historic structure in La Puente, New Mexico, United States

- U.S. National Register of Historic Places
- Location within New Mexico
- Nearest city: La Puente, New Mexico
- Coordinates: 36°42′06″N 106°35′52″W
- Area: 9.7 acres (3.9 ha)
- Architectural style: Irrigation ditch
- MPS: La Tierra Amarilla MRA
- NRHP reference No.: 86002294
- Added to NRHP: September 29, 1986

The La Puente Community Ditch is a 2-mile-long (3.2 km) irrigation ditch which runs through La Puete, New Mexico, United States, that was listed on the National Register of Historic Places in 1986.

== Description ==
The ditch distributes water from the 1862-built Parkview Ditch, serving garden plots and 16 field plots. It stretches from a Parkview discharge point located 100 yards (91 m) southwest of the state fish hatchery lake to a point 0.7 miles (1.1 km) southwest of La Puente along the Rio Chama.

== See also ==
- National Register of Historic Places listings in Rio Arriba County, New Mexico
