= San Antonio de Padua del Quemado Chapel =

- U.S. National Register of Historic Places
- Location within New Mexico
- Location: off NM 76, Cordova, New Mexico
- Coordinates: 36°00′27″N 105°51′35″W
- Area: 0.1 acres (0.040 ha)
- Built: 1832
- NRHP reference No.: 78001821
- Added to NRHP: November 2, 1978

The San Antonio de Padua del Quemado Chapel in Cordova, New Mexico was listed on the National Register of Historic Places in 1978.

It is an L-shaped building made of adobe bricks, built in 1832 to serve the village of Cordova.

It is located off New Mexico State Road 76.

== See also ==
- San Antonio de Padua Church, in Pecos, New Mexico, also NRHP-listed in 1978
