= Jicarilla Apache Historic District =

Historic district in New Mexico, United States

- U.S. National Register of Historic Places
- Location within New Mexico Location within the United States
- Location: Main St., NM 17, Apache, Keliiaa, and Sand Hill Drs., Dulce, New Mexico
- Coordinates: 36°56′02″N 107°00′01″W
- Area: 11.9 acres (4.8 ha)
- NRHP reference No.: 84002956
- Added to NRHP: March 1, 1984

The Jicarilla Apache Historic District in Dulce, New Mexico is an 11.9 acres (4.8 ha) historic district which was listed on the National Register of Historic Places in 1984.

It includes 30 contributing buildings and three contributing sites.

It includes Main St., NM 17, Apache, Keliiaa, and Sand Hill Drs.
