= Brazos, New Mexico =

Census-designated place in Rio Arriba County, New Mexico, United States

- Census-designated place
- Location within New Mexico
- Coordinates: 36°45′03″N 106°33′42″W
- Country: United States
- State: New Mexico
- County: Rio Arriba

Area
  - Total: 0.22 sq mi (0.56 km^{2})
  - Land: 0.22 sq mi (0.56 km^{2})
  - Water: 0 sq mi (0.00 km^{2})
- Elevation: 7,402 ft (2,256 m)

Population (2020)
  - Total: 31
  - Density: 142.8/sq mi (55.12/km^{2})
- Time zone: UTC-7 (Mountain (MST))
  - Summer (DST): UTC-6 (MDT)
- Area code: 505
- GNIS feature ID: 2584060

Brazos is a census-designated place in Rio Arriba County, New Mexico, United States. As of the 2020 census, Brazos had a population of 31.

== Description ==
U.S. Route 64 / U.S. Route 84 passes through Brazos and New Mexico State Road 512 runs along its northern edge. The Los Brazos Historic District, which is listed on the National Register of Historic Places is located in the CDP.

== Demographics ==
Historical population
Census	Pop.	Note	%±
2020	31		—
U.S. Decennial Census

== Education ==
It is within the Chama Valley Independent Schools school district.

== Geography ==
According to the U.S. Census Bureau, the community has an area of 0.217 square miles (0.56 km^{2}), all land.

== Climate ==
Climate data for Brazos Lodge, New Mexico, 1991–2020 normals, 1970-2020 extremes: 8005ft (2440m)
Month	Jan	Feb	Mar	Apr	May	Jun	Jul	Aug	Sep	Oct	Nov	Dec	Year
Record high °F (°C)	60 (16)	60 (16)	70 (21)	79 (26)	90 (32)	96 (36)	95 (35)	90 (32)	87 (31)	81 (27)	75 (24)	59 (15)	96 (36)
Mean maximum °F (°C)	49.0 (9.4)	51.8 (11.0)	61.2 (16.2)	69.4 (20.8)	78.8 (26.0)	85.3 (29.6)	89.0 (31.7)	85.7 (29.8)	79.7 (26.5)	72.8 (22.7)	58.2 (14.6)	49.7 (9.8)	83.8 (28.8)
Mean daily maximum °F (°C)	36.4 (2.4)	39.0 (3.9)	47.6 (8.7)	56.0 (13.3)	66.3 (19.1)	76.8 (24.9)	81.5 (27.5)	78.0 (25.6)	70.4 (21.3)	60.0 (15.6)	46.9 (8.3)	36.6 (2.6)	58.0 (14.4)
Daily mean °F (°C)	25.1 (−3.8)	28.4 (−2.0)	34.9 (1.6)	41.9 (5.5)	51.3 (10.7)	61.4 (16.3)	66.2 (19.0)	64.0 (17.8)	57.1 (13.9)	46.4 (8.0)	35.2 (1.8)	25.8 (−3.4)	44.8 (7.1)
Mean daily minimum °F (°C)	13.8 (−10.1)	17.9 (−7.8)	22.2 (−5.4)	27.8 (−2.3)	36.4 (2.4)	46.0 (7.8)	50.9 (10.5)	50.0 (10.0)	43.8 (6.6)	32.7 (0.4)	23.6 (−4.7)	15.0 (−9.4)	31.7 (−0.2)
Mean minimum °F (°C)	−0.8 (−18.2)	2.6 (−16.3)	6.2 (−14.3)	18.4 (−7.6)	26.1 (−3.3)	33.9 (1.1)	44.7 (7.1)	44.1 (6.7)	31.1 (−0.5)	18.3 (−7.6)	6.4 (−14.2)	−0.5 (−18.1)	−3.6 (−19.8)
Record low °F (°C)	−28 (−33)	−16 (−27)	−8 (−22)	−1 (−18)	11 (−12)	24 (−4)	34 (1)	36 (2)	23 (−5)	6 (−14)	−14 (−26)	−20 (−29)	−28 (−33)
Average precipitation inches (mm)	2.01 (51)	1.75 (44)	1.92 (49)	1.48 (38)	1.79 (45)	0.82 (21)	1.95 (50)	2.84 (72)	2.07 (53)	1.71 (43)	1.67 (42)	1.83 (46)	21.84 (554)
Average snowfall inches (cm)	22.0 (56)	22.6 (57)	22.7 (58)	9.0 (23)	2.9 (7.4)	0.0 (0.0)	0.0 (0.0)	0.0 (0.0)	0.3 (0.76)	3.9 (9.9)	16.1 (41)	21.9 (56)	121.4 (309.06)
Source 1: NOAA (1981-2010 snowfall)
Source 2: XMACIS2 (records & monthly max/mins)

== See also ==
- List of census-designated places in New Mexico
