= Ensenada, New Mexico =

Census-designated place in Rio Arriba County, New Mexico, United States

- Census-designated place
- Location of Ensenada Ensenada (the United States)
- Coordinates: 36°43′51″N 106°32′13″W
- Country: United States
- State: New Mexico
- County: Rio Arriba

Area
  - Total: 1.46 sq mi (3.78 km^{2})
  - Land: 1.46 sq mi (3.78 km^{2})
  - Water: 0 sq mi (0.00 km^{2})
- Elevation: 7,520 ft (2,290 m)

Population (2020)
  - Total: 107
  - Density: 73.4/sq mi (28.34/km^{2})
- Time zone: UTC-7 (Mountain (MST))
  - Summer (DST): UTC-6 (MDT)
- ZIP code: 87575
- Area code: 505
- FIPS code: 35-24960
- GNIS feature ID: 2584095

Ensenada is a census-designated place (CDP) in Rio Arriba County, New Mexico, United States. As of the 2020 census, Ensenada had a population of 107. It had a post office from 1906 to 1958.

== Geography ==
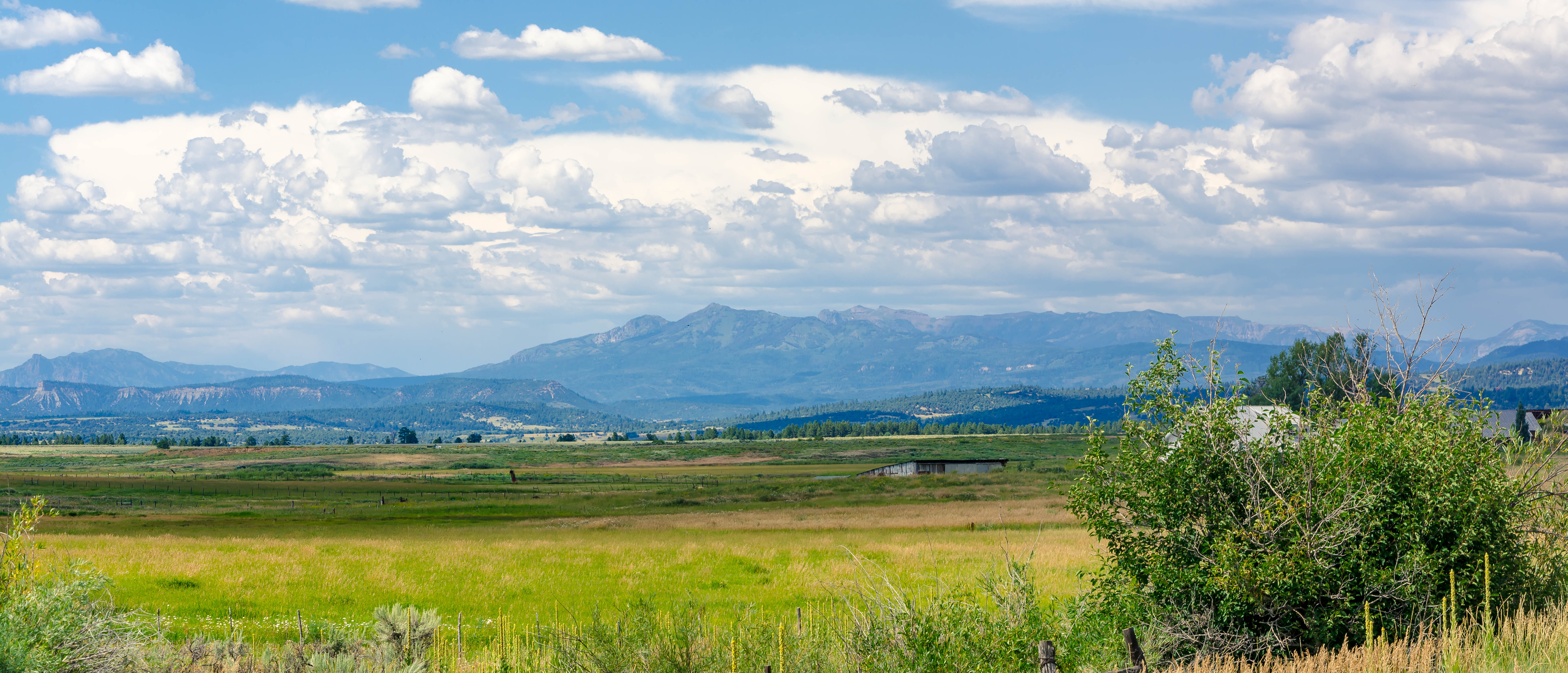
View of Rabbit's Peak near Chama and San Juan Mountains in Colorado from Ensenada, NM.

According to the United States Census Bureau, the CDP has a total area of 1.46 square miles (3.8 km^{2}), all land.

== Demographics ==
Historical population
Census	Pop.	Note	%±
2020	107		—
U.S. Decennial Census

As of the census of 2010, there were 107 people, 42 households, and 30 families residing in the CDP. The population density was 73.3 people per square mile (28.3 people/km^{2}). There were 54 housing units at an average density of 37.0 per square mile (14.3/km^{2}). The racial makeup of the CDP was 72.0% White, 0% African American, 2.8% Native American, 0% Asian, 21.5% from other races, and 3.7% from two or more races. Hispanic or Latino of any race were 88.8% of the population.

There were 42 households, out of which 33.3% had children under the age of 18 living with them, 45.2% were married couples living together, 16.7% had a female householder with no husband present, and 28.6% were non-families. 26.2% of all households were made up of individuals, and 9.5% had someone living alone who was 65 years of age or older. The average household size was 2.55 and the average family size was 2.97.

== Climate ==
This climatic region is typified by large seasonal temperature differences, with warm to hot (and often humid) summers and cold (sometimes severely cold) winters. According to the Köppen Climate Classification system, Ensenada has a humid continental climate, abbreviated "Dfb" on climate maps.

Climate data for Ensenada, New Mexico
Month	Jan	Feb	Mar	Apr	May	Jun	Jul	Aug	Sep	Oct	Nov	Dec	Year
Mean daily maximum °C (°F)	2 (35)	3 (37)	8 (46)	13 (55)	19 (67)	24 (75)	27 (81)	24 (76)	19 (67)	14 (58)	8 (46)	2 (35)	14 (57)
Mean daily minimum °C (°F)	−11 (12)	−9 (16)	−6 (21)	−3 (27)	3 (37)	7 (44)	10 (50)	10 (50)	5 (41)	0 (32)	−5 (23)	−9 (15)	−1 (31)
Average precipitation mm (inches)	53 (2.1)	51 (2)	64 (2.5)	46 (1.8)	41 (1.6)	28 (1.1)	51 (2)	76 (3)	56 (2.2)	53 (2.1)	51 (2)	48 (1.9)	610 (24.2)
Source: Weatherbase

== Education ==
It is within the Chama Valley Independent Schools school district.

== See also ==
- List of census-designated places in New Mexico
