= Abiquiú, New Mexico =

Abiquiú, New Mexico Phéshú Búuˀu (Tewa)
- CDP
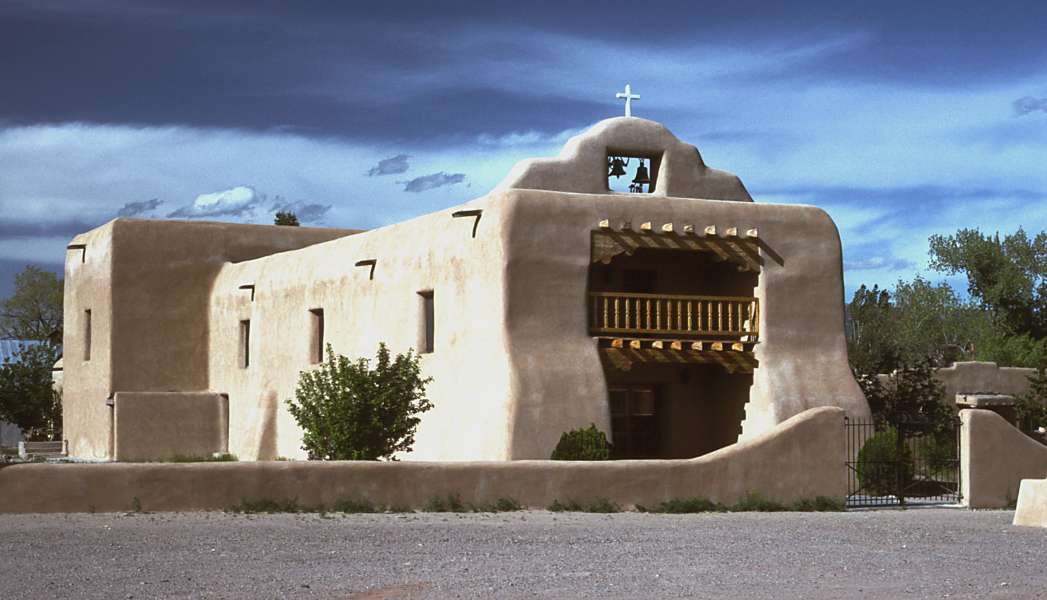
- The adobe Santo Tomás Church in Abiquiú

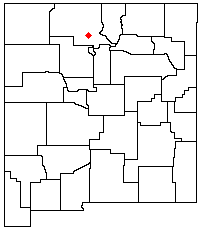
- Location of Abiquiú within New Mexico

- Location in the United States
- Coordinates: 36°12′06″N 106°19′26″W
- Country: United States
- State: New Mexico
- County: Rio Arriba

Area
  - Total: 0.95 sq mi (2.47 km^{2})
  - Land: 0.95 sq mi (2.47 km^{2})
  - Water: 0 sq mi (0.00 km^{2})
- Elevation: 6,172 ft (1,881 m)

Population (2020)
  - Total: 181
  - Density: 189.8/sq mi (73.28/km^{2})
- Time zone: UTC−7 (Mountain (MST))
  - Summer (DST): UTC−6 (MDT)
- ZIP Code: 87510
- FIPS code: 35-00310
- GNIS feature ID: 2584043

Abiquiú (/ˈæbɪkjuː/, Spanish pronunciation: [aβiˈkju], Tewa: Phéshú Búuˀu pronounced [féʃú búːʔù]; Northern Tiwa: Gultɨdda) is a census-designated place in Rio Arriba County, in northern New Mexico in the southwestern United States, about 53 miles (85 km) north of Santa Fe. As of 2010, the population was 231. Abiquiú's one school, an elementary school, is part of the Española Public Schools.

Abiquiú is a Spanish adaptation of Tewa Phéshú Búuˀu, meaning "timber end town". In Tewa, it has been reinterpreted as deriving from Ávéh Shúu (pronounced [ɑ́vé ʃúː]), meaning "chokecherry point".

Due to its settling by Tewa families returning from residency among the Hopi people, Abiquiú has also been called Khoesóˀon Ówîngeh (pronounced [xòːsóʔòŋ ʔówîŋɡè], "Hopi village"), Khoesóˀon being a nickname for the Hopi people used by the Tewa, literally meaning "big leggings".

It is also called Santo Tomás de Abiquiú and the Pueblo of Santo Tomás de Abiquiú. In the mid-18th century, the Spanish crown provided land grants to genízaros here and in other places to establish buffer towns to defend the frontier from raiding tribes such as the Comanche.

Abiquiú was one of the homes of American artist Georgia O'Keeffe from 1929 until 1984. The Georgia O'Keeffe Home and Studio is in Abiquiú. The artist also owned property at the nearby Ghost Ranch. Many of her paintings depict scenes near Abiquiú.

== History ==
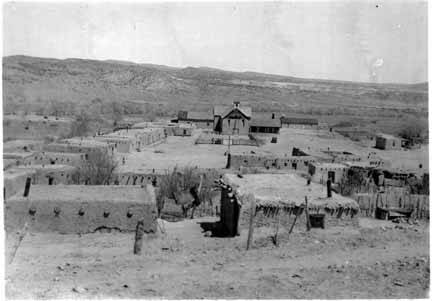
Abiquiú church and plaza around 1920.

Abiquiú was first settled in 1742 by 24 Tewa Pueblo families led by a Roman Catholic priest, Francisco Delgado. The Tewa returned to New Mexico after a lengthy residence among the Hopi people in what would become Arizona. Their settlement in Abiquiú was part of the strategy by New Mexican colonists to defend its frontiers against marauding indigenous peoples such as the Apache, Comanche, and Navajo. Abiquiú was on the northern border of the Spanish settlements of New Mexico. In 1747, in one of the numerous raids in the area, the Comanche took 23 women and children captive, forcing the temporary abandonment of Abiquiú. The captives probably were sold or traded in the flourishing slave trade between and among the Spanish and the surrounding indigenous nations.

In 1754, to deal with the raids and the faltering settlement, New Mexico governor Tomás Vélez Cachupín gave 34 genízaro families a land grant in exchange for them taking a prominent role in frontier defense. Abiquiú was the third such genízaro settlement established in New Mexico, after Belen and Trampas. The genízaros were detribalized Native Americans from various tribes whose origin was typically as war captives, either captured by the Spanish or sold by raiding tribes to the Spanish to work as slaves and servants. Because they had few rights under the casta laws of the Spanish, acceptance of land grants and resettlement on the dangerous frontier of New Mexico was the principal way for genízaros to become landowners. Abiquiú became the archetypal genízaro settlement. Many residents still celebrate their genízaro heritage in the 21st century.

In the late 18th century, peace was established between New Mexico and the Comanche and the Ute. An annual trade fair at Abiquiú drew many indigenous people to the town, especially the Utes, who traded deer skins for horses and tools. Also, settlers purchased or redeemed captive children from the native people. Bands of Utes often camped for the winter near Abiquiú. In the 1840s, the peace with the Utes broke down and 1,000 of them came to Abiquiú with a list of grievances and demands. Several Utes were killed in this confrontation. Peace with the Utes was restored in 1849 by the U.S. government, (Note: On December 30, 1849, U.S. Indian Commissioner James S. Calhoun signed the Treaty of Abiquiú with leaders of the Ute people.) which had recently invaded and conquered New Mexico in the Mexican–American War.

Throughout the 19th century, the residents of Abiquiú struggled to retain ownership of the 16,000 acres (6,500 ha) of land granted them in 1754. In 1894, their right to the land was validated in the United States Court of Private Land Claims. In 1969, additional land, previously designated as National Forest, was returned to the community. Abiquiú is a popular tourist destination, and some Anglo-Americans have settled in the community.

== Old Spanish Trail ==
Abiquiú was the starting point of the pioneering route of the Old Spanish Trail. This first route, the Armijo Route, was led by Antonio Armijo of Santa Fe, with 60 mounted men and a caravan of pack animals carrying blankets and other trade goods to barter for mules in Alta California. Armijo's caravan left Abiquiú on November 7, 1829, and made the journey to San Gabriel Mission in 86 days, arriving on January 31, 1830. He returned by the same route in 56 days, leaving on March 1 and arriving on April 25, 1830. Armijo documented his route daily, unlike travelers on other routes of the Old Spanish Trail. These reports were very brief, listing dates and stopping places with few other details and no distances recorded. He submitted them to the governor, José Antonio Chaves, and the Mexican government published them on June 19, 1830.

== Climate ==
The climate of Abiquiú is a typical semi-arid climate (Köppen: BSk).

Climate data for Abiquiu Dam (1991–2020 normals, (Note: Mean monthly maxima and minima (i.e. the highest and lowest temperature readings during an entire month or year) calculated based on data at said location from 1991 to 2020.) extremes 1957–present). Elevation: 6,380 ft (1,940 m)
Month	Jan	Feb	Mar	Apr	May	Jun	Jul	Aug	Sep	Oct	Nov	Dec	Year
Record high °F (°C)	62 (17)	70 (21)	85 (29)	86 (30)	94 (34)	101 (38)	101 (38)	99 (37)	95 (35)	90 (32)	77 (25)	67 (19)	101 (38)
Mean maximum °F (°C)	55.8 (13.2)	61.0 (16.1)	70.8 (21.6)	77.0 (25.0)	85.9 (29.9)	94.2 (34.6)	96.5 (35.8)	93.5 (34.2)	89.2 (31.8)	81.1 (27.3)	67.9 (19.9)	57.9 (14.4)	97.3 (36.3)
Mean daily maximum °F (°C)	42.0 (5.6)	47.0 (8.3)	55.9 (13.3)	63.3 (17.4)	72.8 (22.7)	83.8 (28.8)	87.5 (30.8)	85.1 (29.5)	78.7 (25.9)	67.0 (19.4)	53.9 (12.2)	43.3 (6.3)	65.0 (18.3)
Daily mean °F (°C)	29.9 (−1.2)	34.4 (1.3)	42.3 (5.7)	49.0 (9.4)	58.2 (14.6)	68.5 (20.3)	72.9 (22.7)	70.9 (21.6)	64.1 (17.8)	52.2 (11.2)	40.6 (4.8)	31.2 (−0.4)	51.2 (10.7)
Mean daily minimum °F (°C)	17.7 (−7.9)	21.8 (−5.7)	28.6 (−1.9)	34.8 (1.6)	43.7 (6.5)	53.3 (11.8)	58.3 (14.6)	56.8 (13.8)	49.5 (9.7)	37.4 (3.0)	27.3 (−2.6)	19.0 (−7.2)	37.4 (3.0)
Mean minimum °F (°C)	6.3 (−14.3)	9.5 (−12.5)	18.2 (−7.7)	25.2 (−3.8)	33.3 (0.7)	43.7 (6.5)	50.5 (10.3)	51.0 (10.6)	40.4 (4.7)	26.2 (−3.2)	16.3 (−8.7)	6.8 (−14.0)	1.4 (−17.0)
Record low °F (°C)	−25 (−32)	−17 (−27)	−8 (−22)	8 (−13)	19 (−7)	28 (−2)	37 (3)	39 (4)	30 (−1)	10 (−12)	−8 (−22)	−18 (−28)	−25 (−32)
Average precipitation inches (mm)	0.41 (10)	0.34 (8.6)	0.58 (15)	0.79 (20)	0.80 (20)	0.62 (16)	1.65 (42)	1.75 (44)	1.19 (30)	0.89 (23)	0.50 (13)	0.54 (14)	10.06 (256)
Average snowfall inches (cm)	2.8 (7.1)	2.0 (5.1)	1.6 (4.1)	0.4 (1.0)	0.0 (0.0)	0.0 (0.0)	0.0 (0.0)	0.0 (0.0)	0.0 (0.0)	0.1 (0.25)	0.6 (1.5)	3.0 (7.6)	10.5 (27)
Average precipitation days (≥ 0.01 inch)	4.4	4.9	5.1	5.4	6.4	4.9	11.2	12.1	7.5	6.4	4.5	5.0	77.8
Average snowy days (≥ 0.1 inch)	1.4	1.4	0.7	0.4	0.0	0.0	0.0	0.0	0.0	0.0	0.3	1.6	5.8
Source: NOAA

== Demographics ==
Historical population
Census	Pop.	Note	%±
2020	181		—
U.S. Decennial Census

== Education ==
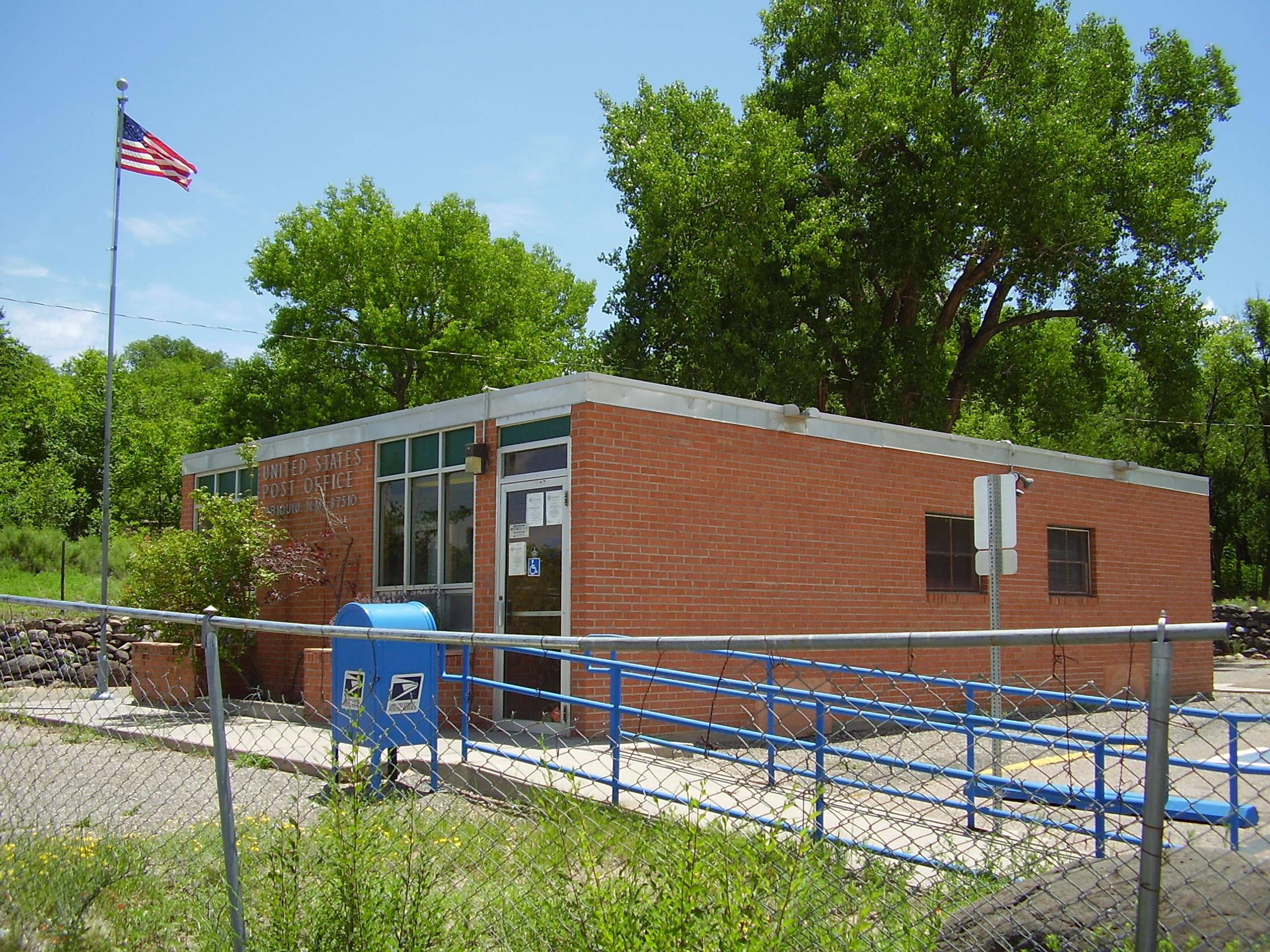
Abiquiú Post Office

It is in Española Public Schools. The comprehensive public high school is Española Valley High School.

== In popular culture ==
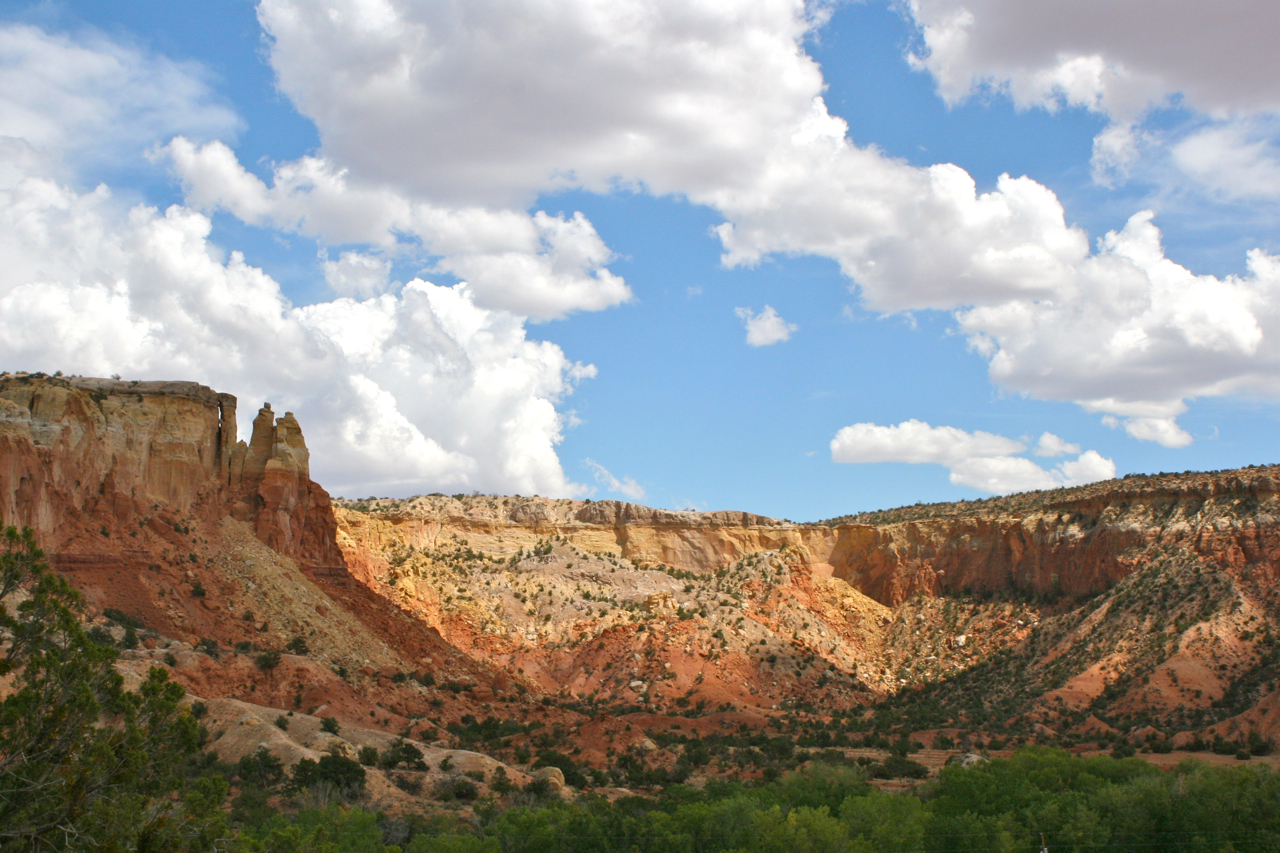
Abiquiú is a popular location for making movies, especially Westerns (pictured, Ghost Ranch).

The colorful canyons and mountains near Abiquiú have been featured in numerous movies, including Red Dawn (1984), Silverado (1985), Lonesome Dove (1989), City Slickers (1991), The Last Outlaw (1993), Wyatt Earp (1994), The Wild Wild West (1999), All the Pretty Horses (2000), The Missing (2003), 3:10 to Yuma (2007), No Country For Old Men (2007), Indiana Jones and the Kingdom of the Crystal Skull (2008), Cowboys & Aliens (2011) and The Lone Ranger (2013), and in the TV series Earth 2.

"Abiquiu" is the title of an episode of Breaking Bad. During the episode, a flashback shows Jesse Pinkman and Jane Margolis visiting a Georgia O'Keeffe exhibition, presumably the one in Abiquiú.

== Nearby points of interest ==
- Abiquiu Lake
- Dar al-Islam (organization)
- Echo Amphitheater
- Georgia O'Keeffe Home and Studio
- Ghost Ranch, home of the Ruth Hall Museum of Paleontology
- Monastery of Christ in the Desert
- Santa Rosa de Lima, New Mexico, a ghost town

== Notable people ==
- Julian A. Chavez (1808–1879), rancher, landowner and elected official in Los Angeles, California
- José Manuel Gallegos (1815–1875), priest, politician, delegate from New Mexico Territory to the U.S. House of Representatives (1853–1856, 1871–1873)
- Georgia O'Keeffe, American artist
