= Los Ojos, New Mexico =

Census-designated place in Rio Arriba County, New Mexico, United States

- Census-designated place
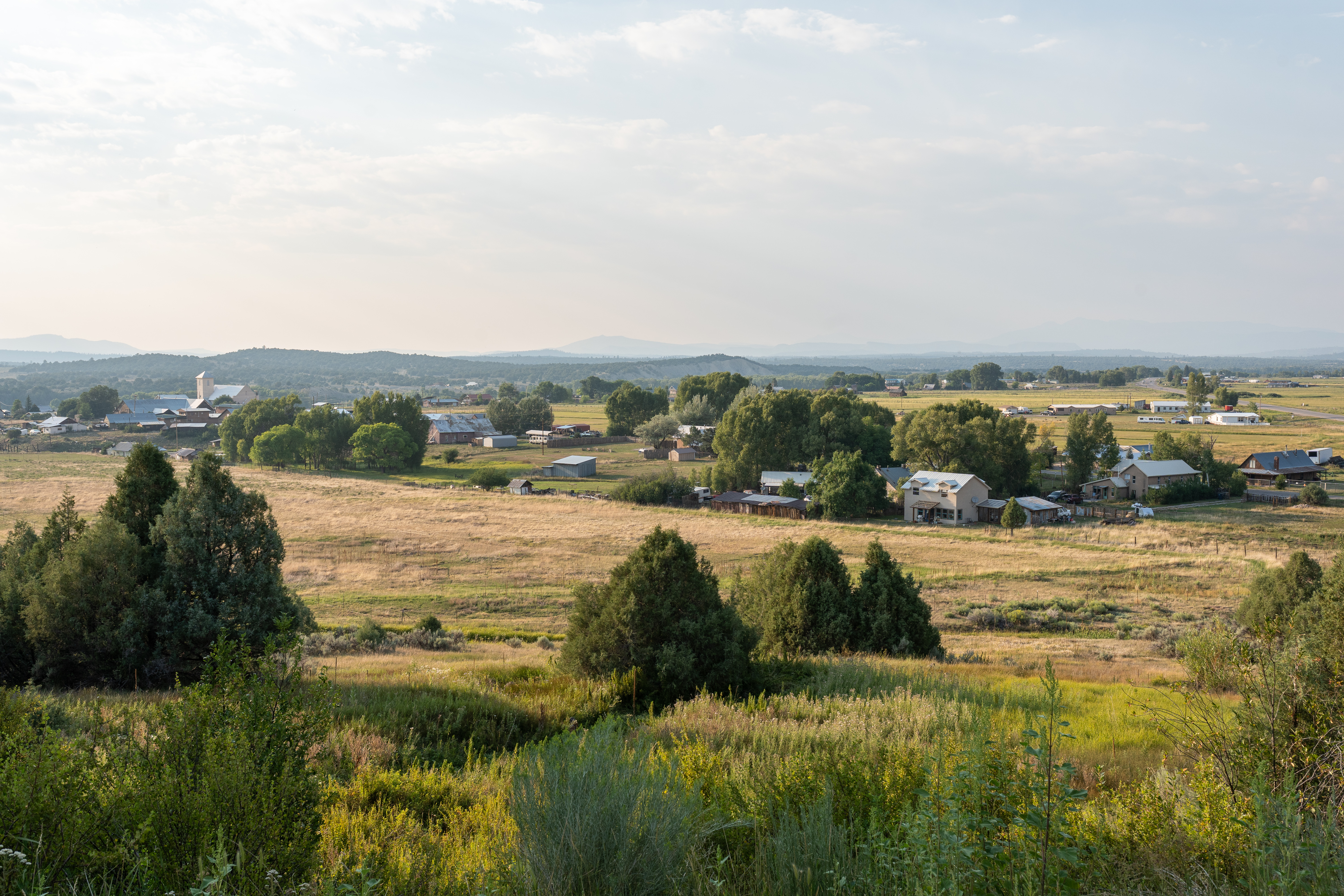
- Overlooking Los Ojos, August 2025

- Location within New Mexico
- Coordinates: 36°44′10″N 106°34′01″W
- Country: United States
- State: New Mexico
- County: Rio Arriba

Area
  - Total: 1.40 sq mi (3.63 km^{2})
  - Land: 1.39 sq mi (3.61 km^{2})
  - Water: 0.0077 sq mi (0.02 km^{2})
- Elevation: 7,372 ft (2,247 m)

Population (2020)
  - Total: 97
  - Density: 69.7/sq mi (26.91/km^{2})
- Time zone: UTC-7 (Mountain (MST))
  - Summer (DST): UTC-6 (MDT)
- ZIP code: 87551
- Area code: 575
- GNIS feature ID: 2584145

Los Ojos is a census-designated place (CDP) in Rio Arriba County, New Mexico, United States. As of the 2020 census, Los Ojos had a population of 97. Los Ojos has a post office with ZIP code 87551, which opened on February 7, 1877. The community is located near U.S. routes 64 and 84.

== Description ==
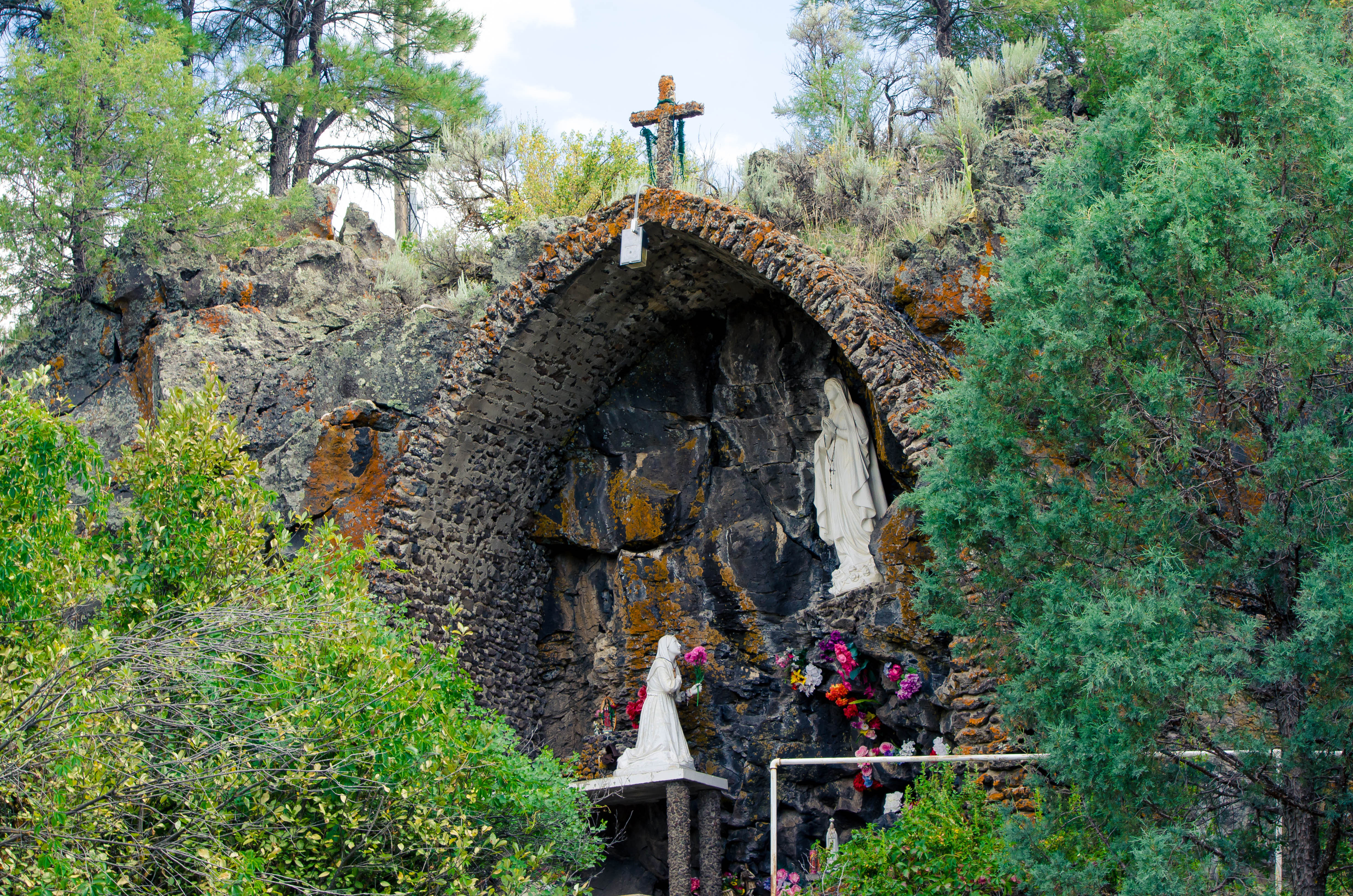
Grotto of the Miracle at Lourdes, south of Los Ojos, August 2015

Historically, the community has also been known as Park View. Los Ojos was founded in 1860, and a nearby colony, Park View, was established in 1876. A post office was opened in Park View in 1877, but the colony and post office were soon abandoned. The post office was reopened in 1880 in Los Ojos, but the post office kept its original name, Park View. Los Ojos thus came to be referred to on maps as Park View, but in 1971, citizens petitioned to have the name officially changed back to Los Ojos, and the petition was granted in 1972.

== Geography ==
According to the U.S. Census Bureau, the community has an area of 1.401 square miles (3.63 km^{2}); 1.392 square miles (3.61 km^{2}) of its area is land, and 0.009 square miles (0.023 km^{2}) is water.

== Demographics ==
Historical population
Census	Pop.	Note	%±
2020	97		—
U.S. Decennial Census

== Education ==
It is within the Chama Valley Independent Schools school district.

== See also ==
- List of census-designated places in New Mexico
