= New Mexico State Road 226 =

State highway in New Mexico, United States

State Road 226
- West Berino Drive

Route information
- Maintained by NMDOT
- Length: 2.600 mi (4.184 km)

Major junctions
- West end: NM 28 in San Miguel
- East end: NM 478 near Berino

Location
- Country: United States
- State: New Mexico
- Counties: Doña Ana

Highway system
- New Mexico State Highway System; Interstate; US; State; Scenic
← NM 225	→ NM 227

State Road 226 (NM 226) is a 2.600-mile-long (4.184 km), paved, two-lane state highway in Doña Ana County in the U.S. state of New Mexico. NM 226's western terminus is north of Chamberino at the road's junction with NM 28. The road's eastern terminus is near Berino at the road's junction with NM 478. The road continues as East Berino Road past the junction with NM 478. NM 226 is also known as West Berino Road.

== Route description ==
The highway begins at the junction with NM 28 north of Chamberino, right after NM 28 crosses the Westside Canal. The road heads east-northeast through pecan orchards and fields of Mesilla Valley and after approximately 0.86 miles (1.38 km) crosses the Rio Grande river over a 475.7-foot-long (145.0 m) bridge, built in 1941. The highway travels east-northeast, before turning east. Approximately one mile (1.6 km) farther, NM 226 reaches the western outskirts of the community of Berino. NM 226 crosses railroad tracks of El Paso Subdivision of BNSF Railway right before reaching its eastern terminus at intersection with NM 478.

== History ==
The section occupied by modern day NM 226 was constructed in the early 1940s as one of the spurs connecting NM 28 with agricultural communities lying along U.S. Route 85 (US 85). In late 1950s this stretch was designated as NM 226.

== Major intersections ==
The entire route is in Doña Ana County.

Location	mi	km	Destinations	Notes
Chamberino	0.000	0.000	NM 28 – La Union, Las Cruces	Western terminus
Berino	2.600	4.184	NM 478 – Anthony, Las Cruces	Eastern terminus
1.000 mi = 1.609 km; 1.000 km = 0.621 mi
