= New Mexico State Road 28 =

State highway in New Mexico, United States

State Road 28
- Lou Henson Highway
- NM 28 highlighted in red

Route information
- Maintained by NMDOT
- Length: 30.346 mi (48.837 km)
- Existed: 1905–present

Major junctions
- South end: FM 259 at the Texas state line near Canutillo, TX
- NM 273 in La Union; NM 292 in Las Cruces; I-10 in Las Cruces; NM 188 in Las Cruces
- North end: NM 478 in Las Cruces

Location
- Country: United States
- State: New Mexico
- Counties: Doña Ana

Highway system
- New Mexico State Highway System; Interstate; US; State; Scenic
| ← NM 27 | → NM 29 |

New Mexico State Road 28 (NM 28) is a 30.346-mile-long (48.837 km) paved, two-lane state highway in Doña Ana County, in the U.S. state of New Mexico. It travels south-to-north roughly paralleling the Rio Grande.

The southern terminus of NM 28 is at the Texas state line west of Canutillo where Farm to Market Road 259 (FM 259; Canutillo La Union Avenue) ends. The northern terminus is in Las Cruces where it intersects NM 478. It also has an interchange with Interstate 10 (I-10) in Las Cruces, shortly before its terminus.

== Route description ==
The highway begins west of Canutillo at the New Mexico - Texas state line where Texas FM 259 highway ends. It continues west-northwest for approximately 0.423 miles (0.681 km) before turning mostly north following the Rio Grande on the west side. NM 28 passes through agricultural communities of the Mesilla Valley such as La Union, Anthony, Vado, Chamberino and La Mesa. The highway passes through a multitude of fields, dairy farms, vineyards, and pecan orchards. After 23.04 miles (37.08 km) the road crosses the Rio Grande over a 369.1-foot-long (112.5 m) bridge, built in 1989, and continues on to Mesilla. After passing through downtown Mesilla as Avenida de Mesilla, NM 28 turns northeast and at 29.674 miles (47.756 km) the highway crosses Interstate 10. NM 28 then continues northeast for another 0.672 miles (1.081 km) until its end at the junction with NM 478.

== History ==
NM 28 was originally created in 1905 by the Territorial Legislative Assembly, and in 1909 it was designated as State Road 28 by the Territorial Roads Commission. After New Mexico attained statehood in 1912, the newly created State Highway Commission redesignated NM 28 as an official state highway. Originally the north terminus of the highway was at intersection with Route 1 in Mesquite. In mid-1930s the highway was extended all the way to Las Cruces. Between mid-1940s and mid-1960s NM 28 was lengthened all the way to US 80/US 85 in Doña Ana and Radium Springs. By late 1960s the highway's northern terminus was shifted back to Las Cruces.

New Mexico governor Bill Richardson originally requested the State Transportation Commission to consider renaming NM 28 as the Lou Henson Highway. Reynold E. Romero, General Counsel for the Department of Transportation, appeared before the State Transportation Commission on February 17, 2005, and requested Commission approval of Resolution 2005–02, dedicating State Highway 28 from Las Cruces to Sunland Park as the Lou Henson Highway. The State Transportation Commission approved the resolution to name the southern New Mexico highway after Lou Henson, a retired New Mexico State University basketball coach. Governor Bill Richardson dedicated the historic highway on March 30, 2005, as the Lou Henson Highway, in recognition of the coach.

== Major intersections ==
The entire route is in Doña Ana County.

| Location | mi | km | Destinations | Notes |
|---|---|---|---|---|
| La Union | 0.000 | 0.000 | FM 259 – Canutillo | Southern terminus |
| La Union | 0.423 | 0.681 | NM 273 south – Sunland Park | Northern terminus of NM 273 |
| La Union | 3.140 | 5.053 | NM 182 south – La Union | Northern terminus of NM 182 |
| La Union | 3.210 | 5.166 | NM 183 east – Vinton | Western terminus of NM 183 |
| Anthony | 6.246 | 10.052 | NM 225 east – Anthony | Western terminus of NM 225 |
| Anthony | 7.852 | 12.637 | NM 186 east – Anthony | Western terminus of NM 186 |
| Chamberino | 10.949 | 17.621 | NM 226 east – Berino | Western terminus of NM 226 |
| La Mesa | 14.529 | 23.382 | NM 189 east – Vado | Western terminus of NM 189 |
| San Miguel | 19.025 | 30.618 | NM 192 east – Mesquite | Western terminus of NM 192 |
| Las Cruces | 27.851 | 44.822 | NM 373 | |
| Las Cruces | 28.086 | 45.200 | NM 101 north | Southern terminus of NM 101 |
| Las Cruces | 28.598 | 46.024 | NM 359 west | Eastern terminus of NM 359 |
| Las Cruces | 28.651 | 46.109 | NM 292 north | Southern terminus of NM 292 |
| Las Cruces | 29.631 | 47.686 | I-10 / US 180 – Las Cruces, El Paso | I-10 exit 140 |
| Las Cruces | 29.934 | 48.174 | NM 188 | |
| Las Cruces | 30.346 | 48.837 | NM 478 | Northern terminus |
1.000 mi = 1.609 km; 1.000 km = 0.621 mi
