= New Mexico State Road 189 =

State highway in New Mexico, United States

State Road 189

Route information
- Maintained by NMDOT
- Length: 1.200 mi (1.931 km)
- Existed: 1988–present

Major junctions
- West end: NM 28 near La Mesa
- East end: NM 478 in Vado

Location
- Country: United States
- State: New Mexico
- Counties: Doña Ana

Highway system
- New Mexico State Highway System; Interstate; US; State; Scenic
← NM 188	→ NM 190

State Road 189 (NM 189) is a 1.200-mile-long (1.931 km) paved, two-lane state highway in Doña Ana County in the U.S. state of New Mexico. NM 189's western terminus is near Vado at the road's junction with NM 478, and the eastern terminus is at the road's junction with NM 28 within La Mesa community.

== Route description ==
The highway begins at the junction with NM 28 in La Mesa. The road heads east through pecan orchards and fields of Mesilla Valley for 0.54 miles (0.87 km) before turning northeast. At 0.870 miles (1.400 km) the highway crosses the Rio Grande river over a 476.1-foot-long (145.1 m) bridge, built in 1941. The road continues northeast and crosses railroad tracks of El Paso Subdivision of BNSF Railway right before reaching its eastern terminus at intersection with NM 478.

== History ==
The section occupied by modern day NM 189 was initially built in 1940-1942 as part of the surge in infrastructure projects across the United States to support wartime logistics and troop movements as a connector between NM 28 and US 85 in Vado. From late 1950s this stretch was part of NM 227 running between NM 28 and U.S. Route 85 (US 85). In 1988, the New Mexico Department of Transportation (NMDOT) went through a radical road renumbering program, and this stretch was designated as NM 189.

== Major intersections ==
The entire route is in Doña Ana County.

Location	mi	km	Destinations	Notes
Vado	0.000	0.000	NM 478 – Anthony, Las Cruces	Western terminus
La Mesa	1.200	1.931	NM 28 – La Union, Las Cruces	Eastern terminus
1.000 mi = 1.609 km; 1.000 km = 0.621 mi
