= New Mexico State Road 227 =

State highway in New Mexico, United States

State Road 227
- Vado Road
- NM 227 highlighted in red

Route information
- Maintained by NMDOT
- Length: 1.981 mi (3.188 km)

Major junctions
- West end: NM 478 in Vado
- I-10 / US 180 in Vado
- East end: FR 1035 in Vado

Location
- Country: United States
- State: New Mexico
- Counties: Doña Ana

Highway system
- New Mexico State Highway System; Interstate; US; State; Scenic
← NM 226	→ NM 228

State Road 227 (NM 227) is a 1.981-mile-long (3.188 km), paved, two-lane state highway in Doña Ana County in the U.S. state of New Mexico. NM 227's western terminus is in Vado at the road's junction with NM 478. The road's eastern terminus is in Vado at Frontage Road 1035 (FR 1035) just east of the road's junction with Interstate 10 (I-10) and U.S. Route 180 (US 180). The road continues as County Road B19 past the junction with FR 1035. NM 227 is also known as Vado Road.

== Route description ==
The highway begins at the junction with NM 478 in southwestern part of Vado, shortly after the NM 28 intersection with NM 189. The road travels east through the fields of Mesilla Valley, past Vado Elementary School and after approximately 1.15 miles (1.85 km) turns northeasterly. The highway skirts Vado from the south and reaches its eastern terminus at intersection with FR 1035 just east of the junction with I-10 and US 180.

== History ==
The original section of NM 227 was first built in early 1940s as a connector road between NM 28 south of La Mesa and U.S. Route 85 (US 85, future NM 478). In late 1950s this road was designated as NM 227. In mid-1960s the road was extended all the way to a frontage road west off I-10. In 1988 the New Mexico Department of Transportation (NMDOT) went through a radical road renumbering program, and the La Mesa–Vado stretch was redesignated as NM 189, whereas the Vado to I-10 section remained NM 227. An overpass over I-10 was constructed in 1990. In 2013 the overpass area and Interstate exit were redesigned, and NM 227 was extended to FR 1035.

== Major intersections ==
The entire route is in Vado, Doña Ana County.

mi	km	Destinations	Notes
0.000	0.000	NM 478 – Anthony, Las Cruces	Western terminus
1.852– 1.952	2.981– 3.141	I-10 / US 180 – Las Cruces, El Paso	I-10 exit 155
1.981	3.188	FR 1035	Eastern terminus
1.000 mi = 1.609 km; 1.000 km = 0.621 mi
