= New Mexico State Road 404 =

State highway in New Mexico, United States

State Road 404
- Charles O'Hara Road
- NM 404 highlighted in red

Route information
- Maintained by NMDOT
- Length: 9.700 mi (15.611 km)
- Existed: June 1952–present

Major junctions
- West end: NM 460 in Anthony
- I-10 near Anthony
- East end: NM 213 in Chaparral

Location
- Country: United States
- State: New Mexico
- Counties: Doña Ana

Highway system
- New Mexico State Highway System; Interstate; US; State; Scenic
← NM 402	→ NM 406

New Mexico State Road 404 (NM 404) is a 9.7-mile-long (15.6 km) paved, two-lane, state-maintained road in Doña Ana County in the U.S. state of New Mexico, that runs east–west across a gap between the northern edge of the Franklin Mountains and the southern edge of the North Franklin Mountains. The gap is known as the Anthony Gap due to its proximity to the community of Anthony. The route's eastern terminus is at an intersection with NM 213 just west of Chaparral, and its western terminus is in Anthony, where it intersects NM 460. It intersects Interstate 10 (I-10).

== Route description ==
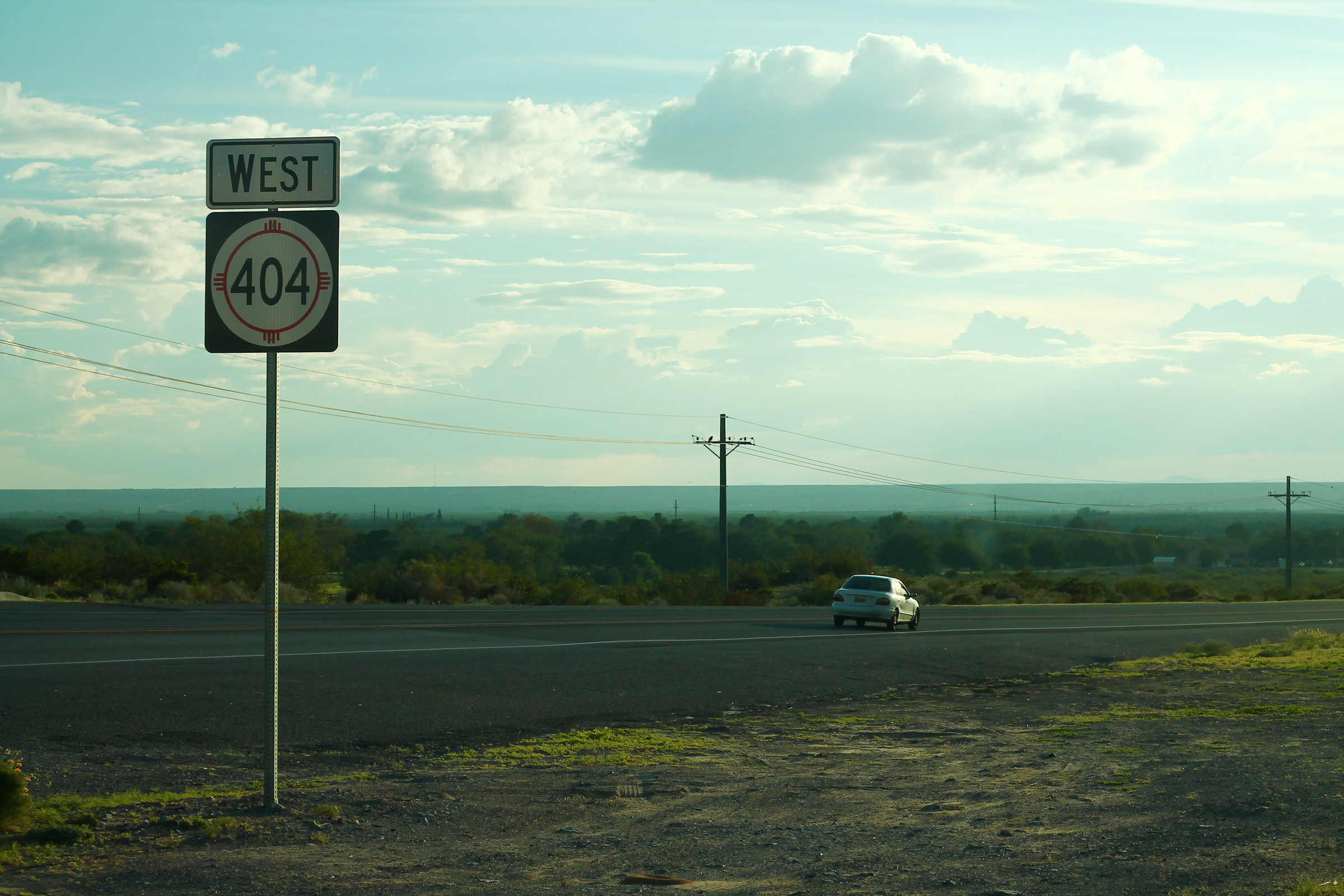
NM 404 westbound

The highway begins in Anthony at the intersection with NM 460. It continues East and after approximately 0.978 miles (1.574 km) crosses Interstate 10. NM 404 then continues southeast for 3.62 miles at which point it enters Anthony Gap, between the Franklin Mountains and North Franklin Mountains ridges. Passing through the gap, NM 404 turns northeast and goes on for 4.335 miles (6.977 km) until its end at NM 213.

== History ==
NM 404 was created in June 1952 by the New Mexico State Highway Commission as Anthony Gap Road. In December 1962, the State Highway Commission passed a resolution changing the road's name to Charles O'Hara Road, after a local prominent businessman from the Anthony area, owner of a large amount of property and also a large local dairy.

The original alignment is between NM 460 and NM 213. During the 1970s, the western terminus shifted westward to NM 478. In the 1980s, the western terminus moved further west to NM 28, but by the 2000s, the western terminus was at its original alignment. The former NM 404 highway between NM 28 and the Rio Grande is now NM 186.

== Major intersections ==
The entire route is in Doña Ana County.

Location	mi	km	Destinations	Notes
Anthony	0.0	0.0	NM 460 – Berino	Western terminus
Anthony	0.8	1.3	Frontage Road 1035 (FR 1035) north – Berino / FR 1043 south – Anthony	Southern terminus of FR 1035; northern terminus of FR 1043
Anthony	0.9	1.4	I-10 / US 85 / US 180 – Las Cruces, El Paso	I-10 Exit 162
Chaparral	9.7	15.6	NM 213	Eastern terminus
1.000 mi = 1.609 km; 1.000 km = 0.621 mi
