= New Mexico State Road 192 =

State highway in New Mexico, United States

State Road 192
- Mesquite Drive

Route information
- Maintained by NMDOT
- Length: 2.367 mi (3.809 km)
- Existed: 1988–present

Major junctions
- West end: NM 28 in San Miguel
- East end: NM 478 / NM 228 in Mesquite

Location
- Country: United States
- State: New Mexico
- Counties: Doña Ana

Highway system
- New Mexico State Highway System; Interstate; US; State; Scenic
| ← NM 190 | → NM 193 |

State Road 192 (NM 192) is a 2.367-mile-long (3.809 km), paved, two-lane state highway in Doña Ana County in the U.S. state of New Mexico. NM 192's western terminus is near San Miguel at the road's junction with NM 28. The road's eastern terminus is near Mesquite at the road's junction with NM 478. The road continues as NM 228 from the junction. NM 192 is also known as Mesquite Drive.

== Route description ==
The highway begins at the junction with NM 28 in San Miguel, right across from the United States Post Office building. The road heads northeasterly for 1.05 miles (1.69 km) through pecan orchards and fields of Mesilla Valley before turning east. The highway then crosses the Rio Grande river over a 482.6-foot-long (147.1 m) bridge, built in 1992. The road continues east through agricultural areas and at 2.04 miles (3.28 km) again turns northeast before reaching the community of Mesquite. Travelling through Mesquite, NM 192 crosses railroad tracks of El Paso Subdivision of BNSF Railway right before reaching its eastern terminus at intersection with NM 478.

== History ==
The section occupied by modern day NM 192 was initially an end segment of NM 28 in Mesquite. In 1930s NM 28 was extended to Mesilla, and the highway section lost its designation as a state road. From late 1950s this stretch was part of NM 228 running between NM 28 and U.S. Route 85 (US 85). In 1988 the New Mexico Department of Transportation (NMDOT) went through a radical road renumbering program, and this stretch was designated as NM 192.

== Major intersections ==
The entire route is in Doña Ana County.

| Location | mi | km | Destinations | Notes |
|---|---|---|---|---|
| San Miguel | 0.000 | 0.000 | NM 28 – La Union, Las Cruces | Western terminus |
| Mesquite | 2.367 | 3.809 | NM 478 – Anthony, Las Cruces / NM 228 east | Eastern terminus, western terminus of NM 228 |
1.000 mi = 1.609 km; 1.000 km = 0.621 mi
