= New Mexico State Road 186 =

State highway in New Mexico, United States

State Road 186
- West Ohara Road

Route information
- Maintained by NMDOT
- Length: 1.250 mi (2.012 km)

Major junctions
- West end: NM 28 near Chamberino
- East end: FL 5872 (Levee Road) near Anthony

Location
- Country: United States
- State: New Mexico
- Counties: Doña Ana

Highway system
- New Mexico State Highway System; Interstate; US; State; Scenic
← NM 185	→ NM 187

State Road 186 (NM 186) is a 1.250-mile-long (2.012 km), paved, two-lane state highway in Doña Ana County in the U.S. state of New Mexico. NM 186's eastern terminus is south of Chamberino at the road's junction with NM 28. The road's western terminus is west of Anthony at the road's junction with Levee Road FL 5872 on the eastern bank of the Rio Grande. The road continues further east as West Ohara Road until its junction with NM 478. NM 186 is also known as West Ohara Road.

== Route description ==
The highway begins at the junction with NM 28 south of Chamberino. The road heads east-northeast through pecan orchards and fields of Mesilla Valley and after approximately 0.7 miles crosses La Union Main Canal. At 1.05 miles (1.69 km) NM 186 passes by Anthony Country Club, then crosses the Rio Grande over a 482.0-foot-long (146.9 m) bridge, built in 1957. NM 186 reaches its eastern terminus at intersection with FL 5872 (Levee Road) right after crossing the river.

== History ==
The original Route 186 was created in mid-1930s as a connector between Route 180 in San Lorenzo, and Route 185 in Beaverhead (current location of Beaverhead Ranger Station). After 1940 the segment became an extension of Route 61. In 1970, the southern part became part of Route 35. By 1988, the northern part through the mountains became NFS 150.

The section occupied by modern day NM 186 was built in mid 1950s as a connector road between NM 28 and NM 478. In 1970s NM 404 was extended first to NM 478, and then in 1980s all the way to NM 28 over the segment of modern day NM 186. In 2000s NM 404 was shortened to its original stretch, and the portion between NM 28 and the Rio Grande bridge was designated as NM 186.

== Major intersections ==
The entire route is in Doña Ana County.

Location	mi	km	Destinations	Notes
Chamberino	0.000	0.000	NM 28 – La Union, Las Cruces	Western terminus
Anthony	1.250	2.012	FL 5872 at the Rio Grande bridge	Eastern terminus
1.000 mi = 1.609 km; 1.000 km = 0.621 mi
