= New Mexico State Road 225 =

State highway in New Mexico, United States

State Road 225
- Washington Street

Route information
- Maintained by NMDOT
- Length: 2.164 mi (3.483 km)

Major junctions
- West end: NM 28 near La Union
- East end: FM 1905 near Anthony

Location
- Country: United States
- State: New Mexico
- Counties: Doña Ana

Highway system
- New Mexico State Highway System; Interstate; US; State; Scenic
← NM 224	→ NM 226

State Road 225 (NM 225) is a 2.164-mile-long (3.483 km), paved, two-lane state highway in Doña Ana County in the U.S. state of New Mexico. NM 225's western terminus is north of La Union at the road's junction with NM 28. The road's eastern terminus is near Anthony at the Texas state line where it continues east as Farm to Market Road 1905 (FM 1905) in Texas. NM 225 is also known as Washington Street.

== Route description ==
The highway begins at the junction with NM 28 north of La Union, right across from Gadsden High School. The road heads mainly east through pecan orchards and fields of Mesilla Valley and after approximately 1.15 miles (1.85 km) crosses the Rio Grande river over a 377.0-foot-long (114.9 m) bridge, built in 1990. The highway continues travelling east, passing by Gadsden Middle School, before reaching its eastern terminus at the Texas state line at the western outskirts of the community of Anthony.

== History ==
NM 225 was constructed in the early 1940s as one of the spurs connecting NM 28 with agricultural communities lying along U.S. Route 85 (US 85). In late 1950s this stretch was designated as NM 225.

== Major intersections ==
The entire route is in Doña Ana County.

Location	mi	km	Destinations	Notes
La Union	0.000	0.000	NM 28 – La Union, Las Cruces	Western terminus
Anthony	2.164	3.483	FM 1905 at Texas state line	Eastern terminus
1.000 mi = 1.609 km; 1.000 km = 0.621 mi
