= New Mexico State Road 478 =

State highway in New Mexico, United States

State Road 478
- NM 478 highlighted in red

Route information
- Maintained by NMDOT
- Length: 24.342 mi (39.175 km)
- Existed: 1956–present
- History: The entire highway is a former section of US 80 and US 85

Major junctions
- South end: NM 460 in Anthony
- NM 192 / NM 228 in Mesquite; I-10 / NM 188 in Las Cruces; NM 28 in Las Cruces
- North end: US 70 in Las Cruces

Location
- Country: United States
- State: New Mexico
- Counties: Doña Ana

Highway system
- New Mexico State Highway System; Interstate; US; State; Scenic
← NM 475	→ NM 480

State Road 478 (NM 478) is a 24.342-mile-long (39.175 km) state highway located entirely within Doña Ana County, New Mexico. Starting in Anthony and ending in Las Cruces, NM 478 was once a section of historic US 80, a major transcontinental highway between San Diego, California and Savannah, Georgia. In 1946, it also became part of U.S. Route 85, when the latter highway was extended south to the Mexican border in El Paso, Texas. US 80 and US 85 were rerouted onto a newer alignment to the east in the mid 1950s. This was also around the time the older highway was designated NM 478. For two years, the southern terminus of NM 478 also served as the national western terminus of US 80 until that highway was removed from New Mexico completely in 1991. Today, NM 478 remains on much the same route it has since it was first designated and serves several old US 80/US 85 communities long since bypassed by I-10

== History ==
NM 1 was a predecessor of present day NM 478.

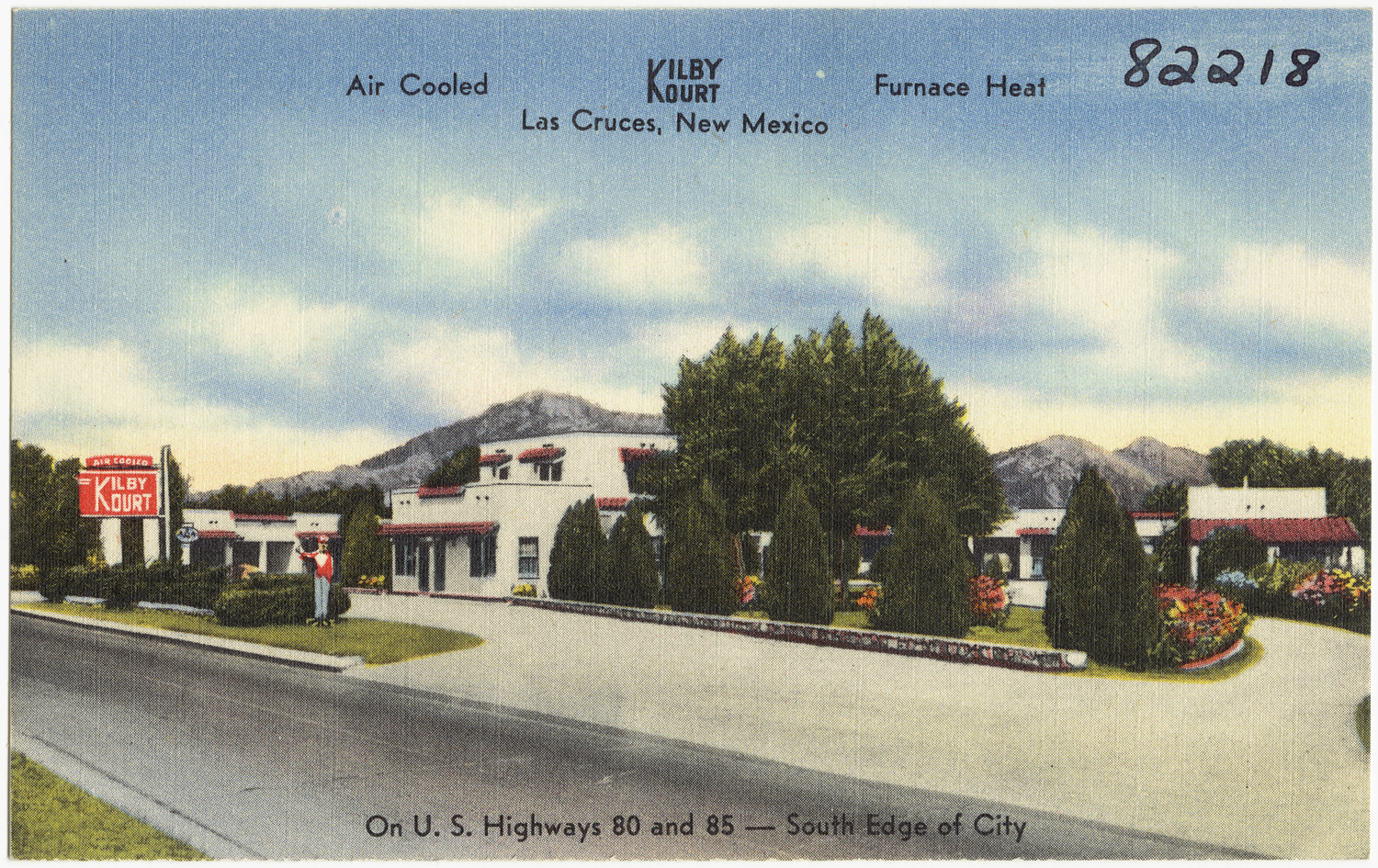
The Kilby Motel on old US 80/US 85 (now NM 478) in Las Cruces. This is currently the oldest motel in Las Cruces still standing.

The first designated highway between Anthony at the Texas state line and Las Cruces was New Mexico State Road 1 in 1912. NM 1 continued past Las Cruces through Albuquerque and Santa Fe to the Colorado state line near Raton. The road to Lordsburg was designated NM 4 while the road to Alamogordo was designated NM 3. Between Las Cruces and Anthony, NM 1 passed through Berino and Mesquite. The Dixie Overland Highway auto trail was designated over NM 1 in 1917. The Dixie Overland Highway was the first marked route to run between Savannah, Georgia and southern California. The auto trail entered New Mexico through Anthony from El Paso, Texas, then traveled north to Mesilla Park where it turned west to Deming, Lorsburg and Steins, before heading south into Rodeo and southwest into Arizona towards Douglas. By 1920, the Bankhead Highway was also designated over the southern part of NM 1, further joined by the Old Spanish Trail in 1923. In 1917, Texas State Highway 1 was designated from the south end of NM 1 to El Paso along the Dixie Overland Highway. On November 11, 1926, the United States Department of Agriculture and the American Association of State Highway Officials approved and designated a new numbered transcontinental highway system known as the United States Numbered Highway System. NM 1 was designated as part of U.S. Route 80 between Anthony and Las Cruces, while the section north of Las Cruces became U.S. Route 85. US 80 was also designated over the entirety of NM 4 between Las Cruces and Lordsburg. Much like the Dixie Overland Highway before it, US 80 also ran between San Diego and Savannah. Due to the introduction of the U.S. Highway System into New Mexico, the State Highway Department undertook a massive reorganization of the state highway system in 1927 to better include the new routes. As such, NM 1 was removed in its entirety as was NM 4 in favor of both US 80 and US 85.

The only major change to the route for many years was a slight realignment of US 80 through downtown Las Cruces in the 1930s. By 1939, US 70 had replaced NM 3 between Alamogordo and Las Cruces and multiplexed with US 80 from Las Cruces to Lordsburg. To this day, US 70 still travels between Alamogordo and Lordsburg. In 1946, US 85 was extended south to the Mexican border in El Paso, multiplexing with US 80 from Las Cruces into Texas. In 1956, US 80 and US 85 were moved onto a new alignment between Anthony and Las Cruces bypassing the older route through Berino, Vado, Mesquite, Fillmore and Mesilla Park. The old route was re-designated NM 478. The new bypass was later rebuilt to Interstate highway standards and became part of Interstate 10. I-10 replaced all of US 80 through western Texas, New Mexico and part of Arizona. As such, US 80 was truncated to the southern terminus of NM 478 in 1989. In 1991, US 80 was removed from New Mexico completely and the small remaining section became part of NM 460. Much like it did when first designated, NM 478 still ends in the south at NM 460 (former US 80) and US 70 within Las Cruces at the north.

== Route description ==
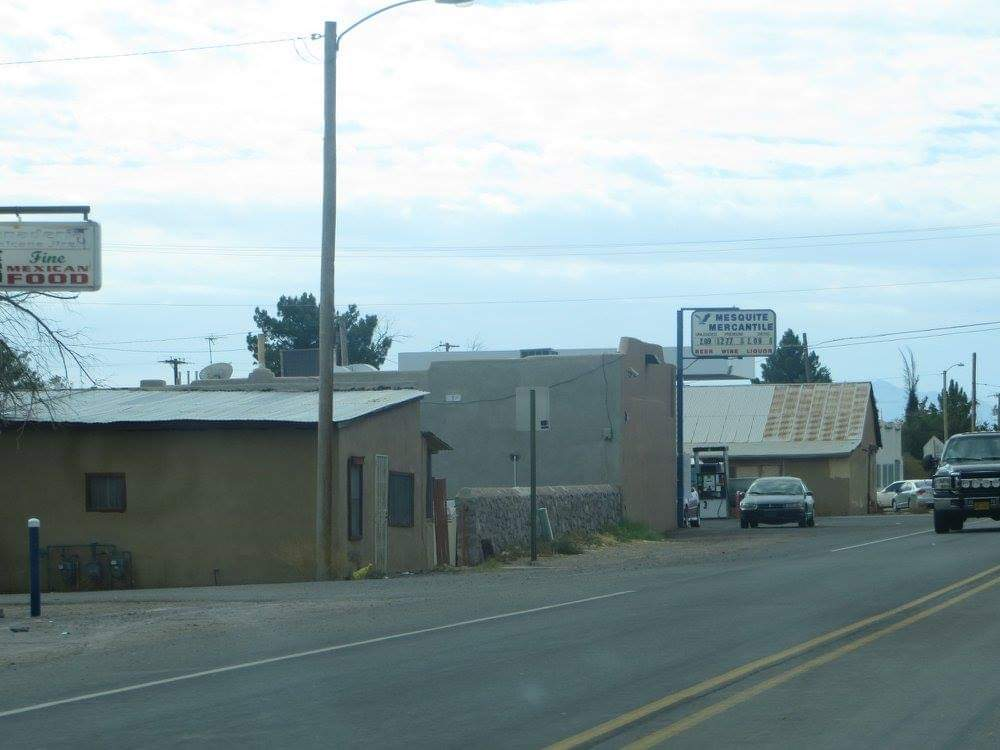
Roadside businesses on the side of NM 478, dating back to the US 80/US 85 days.

The entire route of NM 478 is 24.172 miles (38.901 km) long. NM 478 begins at a traffic circle in Anthony with NM 460 and heads due northwest through rural farmland as a two lane highway. In the small community of Berino, NM 478 passes an intersection with Berino Road (NM 226). Further north, the highway passes the western terminus of NM 189 NM 478 reaches Mesquite where it meets NM 192 and NM 228 at a signaled intersection at the center of the small community. A few miles after passing a Y-shaped intersection with Show Road, a county maintained highway leading to Mesilla, NM 478 enters the Las Cruces metro area becoming Main Street. After passing Tortugas Drive (NM 138) and Union Avenue (NM 373) NM 478 reaches a pair of freeway ramps at Conway Avenue. There is only an exit ramp and entrance ramp for I-10 east (unsigned US 85 south and US 180 east) here. Drivers can access I-10 west (unsigned US 85 north/US 180 west) via southbound NM 188 (Valley Drive) or eastbound NM 101 a few blocks north. At the intersection and northern terminus of NM 28, NM 478 curves northeast. NM 28 is known as Avenida de Mesilla and is the main road through the old Mexican village.

NM 478 meets with NM 342, which uses a pair of one way streets. One block north at Bowman Avenue, NM 478 itself splits into two one way streets, with the northbound lanes using Church Street, while the southbound lanes use Water Street. Until recently, Main Street between the two lanes was a pedestrian street, only just recently rebuilt into a through street for traffic. This area is the heart of downtown Las Cruces. Shortly after Water Street and Church Street converge back into Main Street, NM 478 reaches its northern terminus at a signalized intersection with US 70 at Picacho Street. To the left, westbound US 70 to Deming and Lordsburg is former US 80 west and US 85 north.

Along the highway between Anthony and Las Cruces are several old businesses and relics from the era when NM 478 was part of US 80 and US 85. Many have been closed down and abandoned due to being bypassed by the Interstate. Several old motels and restaurants dot the highway in Las Cruces, including some of the earliest motels built along US 80 in New Mexico.

== Major intersections ==
The entire route is in Doña Ana County.

Location	mi	km	Destinations	Notes
Anthony	0.000	0.000	NM 460 to I-10 – El Paso	Southern terminus; traffic circle; former US 80/US 85
Berino	4.827	7.768	NM 226 west (Berino Road) – Chamberino	Eastern terminus of NM 226
Vado	8.529	13.726	NM 189 west – La Mesa	Eastern terminus of NM 189
Vado	8.760	14.098	NM 227 east (Vado Road)	Western terminus of NM 227
Mesquite	12.308	19.808	NM 192 west (Mesquite Drive) / NM 228 east – San Miguel	Western terminus of NM 192; eastern terminus of NM 228
	14.014	22.553	Snow Road – La Mesilla	
	20.466	32.937	NM 138 east (Tortugas Drive)	Western terminus of NM 138
Las Cruces	20.993	33.785	Union Avenue	Former eastern terminus of NM 373
Las Cruces	21.206	34.128	I-10 east – El Paso	No access from NM 478 to I-10 west; no access from I-10 west to NM 478
Las Cruces	21.444	34.511	NM 101 (University Avenue) – Mesilla	
Las Cruces	22.700	36.532	NM 188 (Valley Drive) to I-10 – Tucson, El Paso	Former US 80/US 85
Las Cruces	22.718	36.561	NM 28 south (Avenida de Mesilla) – Mesilla	Northern terminus of NM 28
Las Cruces	23.390– 23.455	37.643– 37.747	NM 342 east (Lohman Avenue) NM 342 west (Amador Avenue)	Lohman Avenue and Amador Avenue are a one-way pair
Las Cruces	24.342	39.175	US 70 (Picacho Avenue) – Deming, Alamogordo	Northern terminus; US 70 west is former US 80 west/US 85 north
1.000 mi = 1.609 km; 1.000 km = 0.621 mi: Incomplete access
