= New Mexico State Road 460 =

State highway in New Mexico, United States

State Road 460
- Anthony Drive
- NM 460 highlighted in red

Route information
- Maintained by NMDOT
- Length: 3.805 mi (6.124 km)

Major junctions
- South end: SH 20 at the Texas state line in Anthony
- NM 478 in Anthony
- North end: Frontage Road 1035 (FR 1035) near Berino

Location
- Country: United States
- State: New Mexico
- Counties: Doña Ana

Highway system
- New Mexico State Highway System; Interstate; US; State; Scenic
← NM 458	→ NM 461

State Road 460 (NM 460) is a 3.805-mile-long (6.124 km) paved, two-lane state highway in Doña Ana County, in the U.S. state of New Mexico.

The southern terminus of NM 460 is at the Texas state line in the town of Anthony where SH 20 ends. The northern terminus is south of Berino where it ends in a T-intersection with Frontage Road 1035 (FR 1035) on the west side of Interstate 10.

== Route description ==
The highway begins in the town of Anthony at the New Mexico - Texas state line where SH 20 highway ends. The road travels north-northeast for approximately 0.3 miles (0.48 km) before turning mostly north. NM 460 passes by the Dos Lagos Golf Club and continues north through Anthony, and after 1.7 miles (2.7 km) intersects NM 404. Continuing north, the highway enters the southern outskirts of the community of Berino, and reaches its northern terminus at intersection with FR 1035 west of the former I-10 exit 160.

== History ==
According to available maps, the road occupied by the modern day NM 460 was originally constructed in the mid-1950s as the new alignment for US 80/US 85, east of the original path of the highway. I-10 was then built over the new alignment and extended south into Texas in late 1950s with exception of a short spur angling west towards Anthony. This spur was designated as NM 460 some time in early to mid 1960s. Originally, this road connected with I-10 at a trumpet interchange (known as exit 160) south of Berino. Some time around 2000 this interchange was eliminated, probably to allow construction of a large NM Truck Port of Entry roughly at this location. A new interchange at junction with NM 404 (exit 162) was constructed instead farther south.

== Major intersections ==
The entire route is in Doña Ana County.

Location	mi	km	Destinations	Notes
Anthony	0.000	0.000	SH 20 – El Paso	Southern terminus
Anthony	0.210	0.338	NM 478 north – Las Cruces	Southern terminus of NM 478; roundabout; former alignment of US 80/US 85
Anthony	1.710	2.752	NM 404 east to I-10 – Chaparral	Western terminus of NM 404
Berino	3.805	6.124	FR 1035 – Berino, Vado, NM 404	Northern terminus; west of I-10
1.000 mi = 1.609 km; 1.000 km = 0.621 mi
