= Gadsden Independent Schools =

School district in New Mexico, United States

The Gadsden Independent School District (GISD) is a New Mexico school district headquartered in Sunland Park. Gadsden ISD's superintendent is currently Travis Dempsey who was appointed by the board of education after Efren Yturralde's resignation June 2017. GISD serves Doña Ana County and southern Otero County with a total territory of 1,400 square miles (3,600 km^{2}). The school district is named for James Gadsden.

As of 2015 it has 14,200 students.

== Cities and Towns ==
Cities and towns served by the district include the following:

In both Doña Ana County and Otero counties:

- Chaparral

In Doña Ana County:

- Anthony
- Berino
- Chamberino
- La Mesa
- La Union
- Mesquite
- San Miguel
- Santa Teresa
- Sunland Park
- Vado

== Educational Facilities ==
Its educational facilities include the following:

- 5 high schools (Gadsden High School, Santa Teresa High School, Chaparral High School, Desert Pride Academy (alternative school), and Alta Vista Early College High School)
- 3 middle schools (Chaparral Middle School, Gadsden Middle School, Santa Teresa Middle School)
- 16 elementary schools
- 4 pre-Kindergarten schools
- 1 administrative complex
- 1 regional treatment hospital
- Gadsden ISD Warehouse
