= Farm to Market Road 1905 =

Road in Texas

Farm to Market Road 1905

Route information
- Maintained by TxDOT
- Length: 2.169 mi (3.491 km)
- Existed: November 20, 1951–present

Major junctions
- West end: NM 225 at the New Mexico state line in Anthony
- SH 20 in Anthony
- East end: I-10 in Anthony

Location
- Country: United States
- State: Texas
- Counties: El Paso

Highway system
- Highways in Texas; Interstate; US; State; Former; Toll; Loops; Spurs; FM/RM; Park; Rec
← FM 1904	→ FM 1906

Farm To Market Road 1905 (FM 1905) is a farm-to-market road in the U.S. state of Texas, maintained by the Texas Department of Transportation. The entire route is in the town of Anthony, which is located across the state line from New Mexico. It is the first road with which Interstate 10 has an interchange after entering Texas from New Mexico. FM 1905 begins at the state border as a continuation of NM 225, and ends at Interstate 10 in Anthony. A short segment is concurrent with SH 20. The FM 1905 designation was first assigned in 1951, and was extended to its current route in 1969.

== History ==
FM 1905 was assigned on November 20, 1951 from the state line to U.S. Highway 80 (now State Highway 20). As the route was extended, stretching for 1.9 miles (3.1 km) to its current route in October 31, 1958.

== Route description ==
FM 1905 begins at the New Mexico state line, as a continuation of NM 225 in Anthony, New Mexico. The road, known as West Washington Street, parallels the state line as it heads eastward towards downtown Anthony. There are intersections with local roads before FM 1905 intersects SH 20 after 0.8 mi (1.3 km). The two routes run concurrently along South Main Street for about 0.1 mi (0.16 km) before FM 1905 continues eastward again, now heading towards I-10 on Franklin Street. FM 1905 passes by a city-maintained park complex before leaving downtown Anthony. It becomes known as Antonio Street as it enters the outskirts of Anthony, where it intersects with Spur 6 before coming to an end at exit 0 of I-10.

== Major intersections ==
The entire route is in Anthony, El Paso County.

mi	km	Destinations	Notes
0.00	0.00	NM 225 west (Washington Street)	New Mexico state line
0.7	1.1	SH 20 west (North Main Street) to NM 460 / NM 478 – Anthony	Western end of SH 20 concurrency
0.8	1.3	SH 20 east (South Main Street) – Vinton	Eastern end of SH 20 concurrency
2.0	3.2	Spur 6 south (Wildcat Drive)	Northern terminus of Spur 6
2.17	3.49	I-10 / US 85 / US 180 – El Paso, Las Cruces	Exit 0 (I-10)
1.000 mi = 1.609 km; 1.000 km = 0.621 mi: Concurrency terminus
