= New Mexico State Road 101 =

State highway in New Mexico, United States

State Road 101
- West University Avenue
- NM-101 highlighted in red

Route information
- Maintained by NMDOT
- Length: 1.420 mi (2.285 km)
- Existed: c. 1940–present

Major junctions
- West end: NM 28 in Mesilla
- East end: NM 478 in Las Cruces

Location
- Country: United States
- State: New Mexico
- Counties: Doña Ana

Highway system
- New Mexico State Highway System; Interstate; US; State; Scenic
← NM 97	→ NM 102

State Road 101 (NM 101) is a 1.42-mile-long (2.29 km) paved, two-lane state highway in Doña Ana County in the U.S. state of New Mexico. NM 101's western terminus is at the road's junction with NM 28 within Mesilla community. The road's eastern terminus is in Las Cruces at the road's junction with NM 478. NM 101 is also known as West University Avenue.

== Route description ==
The highway begins at the junction with NM 28 east of historic Mesilla. The road heads northeast through residential areas of Mesilla, and pecan orchards and fields of Mesilla Valley. After approximately 0.5 miles (0.80 km) the road passes by Zia Middle School. Continuing northeast 0.7 miles (1.1 km) farther, the highway runs by Fabian Garcia Botanical Gardens, part of the NMSU Agricultural Experiment Station. At this point, the highway broadens to 4 lanes before reaching its northeastern terminus at intersection with NM 478. The road continues as East University Avenue past the junction.

== History ==
The original Route 101 ran from Pojoaque west to San Idelfonso as an "unimproved" road. This route became Route 4 by the 1930 map and continued with that designation through the 1931, 1934, 1935 maps. This road is presently NM 4.

NM 101 first appears on 1940 roadmap, as a connector between State College (future NMSU) and US 80/US 85 south of Las Cruces. The road construction was probably related to the New Mexico State College introducing Air Mechanics Courses starting at some point prior to 1941. The Air Mechanics Building & the Hangar Lake Building both were erected in 1941 (according to plaques on the buildings), and State College Airport was constructed around the same time. In 1960s the road was extended further east to I-25. In 1988, the New Mexico Department of Transportation (NMDOT) went through a radical road renumbering program, and NM 101 was extended further west to NM 28. In 2001 a portion of this highway between South Main Street and Telshor Boulevard was transferred to the city of Las Cruces shortening NM 101 to its current length.

== Major intersections ==
The entire route is in Doña Ana County.

Location	mi	km	Destinations	Notes
Mesilla	0.000	0.000	NM 28 – La Union, Las Cruces	Western terminus
Las Cruces	1.420	2.285	NM 478 – Anthony, Las Cruces	Eastern terminus
Las Cruces	1.420	2.285	University Avenue; To I-25 / US 85	Continuation beyond NM 478
1.000 mi = 1.609 km; 1.000 km = 0.621 mi
