= New Mexico State Road 188 =

State highway in New Mexico, United States

State Road 188
- South Valley Drive

Route information
- Maintained by NMDOT
- Length: 2.945 mi (4.740 km)
- Existed: 1988–present

Major junctions
- South end: I-10 / US 180 in Las Cruces
- North end: US 70 / NM 185 in Las Cruces

Location
- Country: United States
- State: New Mexico
- Counties: Doña Ana

Highway system
- New Mexico State Highway System; Interstate; US; State; Scenic
← NM 187	→ NM 189

State Road 188 (NM 188) is a 2.945-mile-long (4.740 km) paved, four-lane state highway in Doña Ana County in the U.S. state of New Mexico. NM 188's southern terminus is at the road's junction with an exit ramp of Interstate 10 (I-10) and U.S. Route 180 (US 180) in Las Cruces, on the western edge of NMSU campus. The road's northern terminus is in Las Cruces at the road's junction with US 70 and the southern terminus of NM 185. NM 188 is also known as South Valley Drive.

== Route description ==
The highway lies entirely within the city of Las Cruces limits, and travels through commercial and residential areas of the city. The highway begins at the end of the exit ramp of I-10 from where the ramp becomes a two-lane road. The road first follows I-10 northeasterly for approximately 0.9 miles (1.4 km), intersecting East University Avenue, first, then NM 478. The road then turns farther north, crossing NM 28, and arrives at its northeastern terminus at the intersection with US 70.

== History ==
NM 188 together with NM 185 and NM 187 once were parts of US 85. The old US 85 was created by Congress in 1925, and was built in late 1920s-early 1930s. US 85 was a major thoroughfare in the state of New Mexico, connecting southern and northern parts of the state. With the construction of I-25 in 1956, US 85 was relegated to a secondary highway role. According to available maps, sometime between 1958 and 1962, a US 85 bypass road was constructed through the southwestern side of Las Cruces. In 1988, the New Mexico Department of Transportation (NMDOT) went through a radical road renumbering program, and US 85 was eliminated from the state designation, instead the original length of the highway was broken into smaller segments. A short spur connecting I-10 to US 70 over the stretch of former US 85 Bypass was designated as NM 188.

== Major intersections ==
The entire route is in Las Cruces, Doña Ana County.

mi	km	Destinations	Notes
0.000	0.000	I-10 / US 180 – El Paso, Deming	Southern terminus; I-10 exit 142
0.355	0.571	NM 478 – Anthony, Las Cruces	
1.450	2.334	NM 28 – La Union, Las Cruces	
2.945	4.740	US 70 / NM 185 north – Alamogordo, Deming	Northern terminus; southern terminus of NM 185
1.000 mi = 1.609 km; 1.000 km = 0.621 mi
