= Doña Ana County, New Mexico =

County in New Mexico, United States

- County
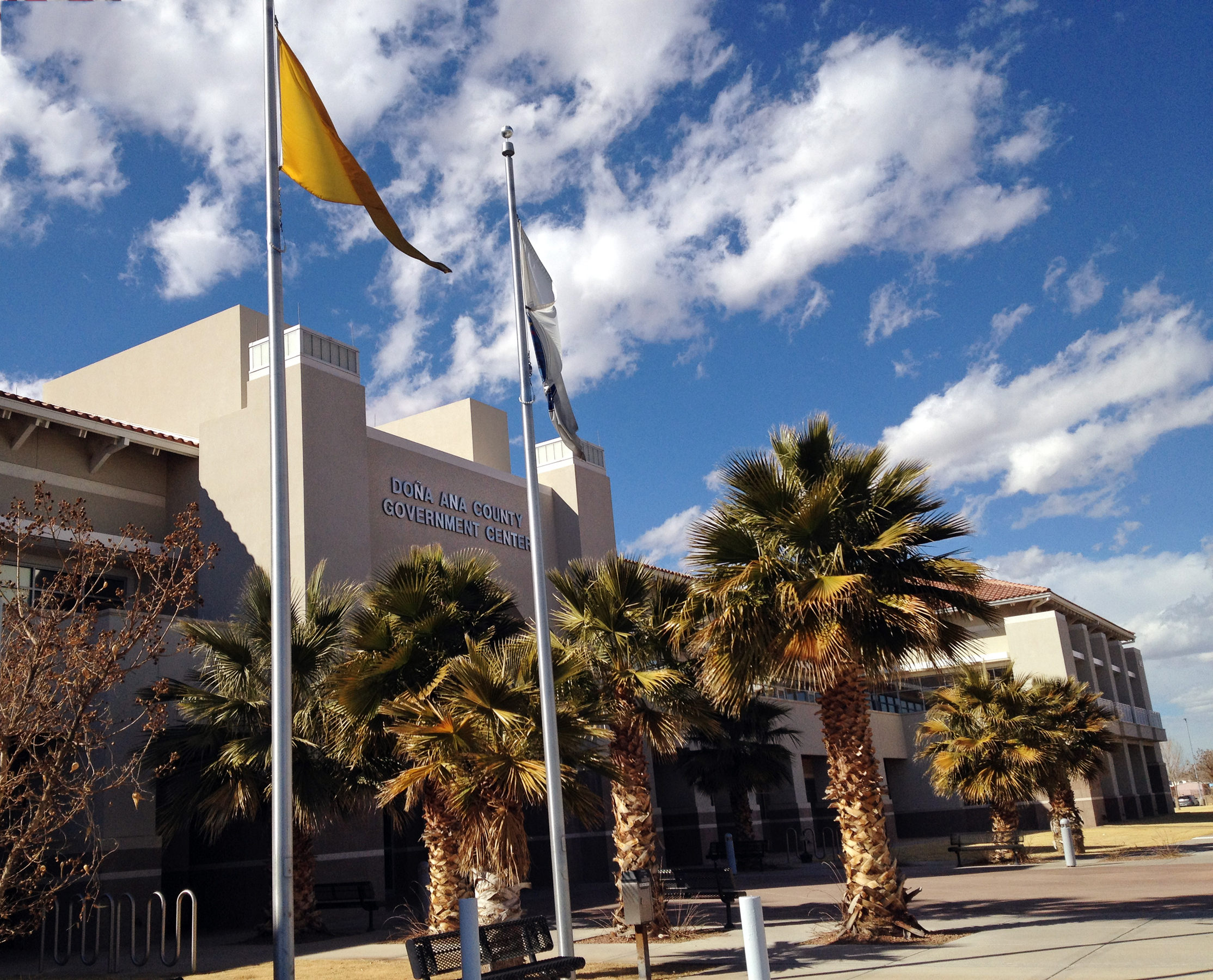
- Doña Ana County Government Center

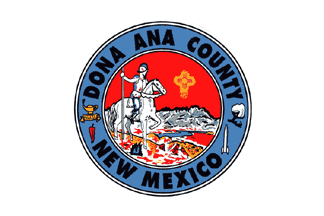
- Flag Seal

- Location within the U.S. state of New Mexico
- Coordinates: 32°18′44″N 106°46′42″W
- Country: United States
- State: New Mexico
- Founded: 1852
- Seat: Las Cruces
- Largest city: Las Cruces

Area
  - Total: 3,814 sq mi (9,880 km^{2})
  - Land: 3,808 sq mi (9,860 km^{2})
  - Water: 6.9 sq mi (18 km^{2}) 0.2%

Population (2020)
  - Total: 219,561
  - Estimate (2025): 229,091 ▲
  - Density: 57.66/sq mi (22.26/km^{2})
- Time zone: UTC−7 (Mountain)
  - Summer (DST): UTC−6 (MDT)
- Congressional district: 2nd
- Website: www.donaana.gov

Doña Ana County (Spanish: Condado de Doña Ana; lit. 'County of Lady Ana') is a county located in the southern part of the New Mexico, United States. As of the 2020 U.S. census, its population was 219,561, which makes it the second-most populated county in New Mexico. Its county seat is Las Cruces, which has a population of 111,385 as of the 2020 U.S. Census, making it the second-most populous municipality in New Mexico after Albuquerque.

The county is named for Doña Ana Robledo, who died there in 1680 while fleeing the Pueblo Revolt.

Doña Ana County consists of the Las Cruces, NM Metropolitan Statistical Area, which is also included in the El Paso–Las Cruces, TX–NM Combined Statistical Area. It borders Luna, Sierra, and Otero counties in New Mexico, and El Paso County, Texas, to the east and southeast.

The Mexican state of Chihuahua borders the county to the south. Construction of an improved barrier on the border was expedited in 2019 with waivers of environmental and other laws. The waivers applied to 27 laws, including protection of endangered species, archeological sites, and historic places.

Being 67.3% Hispanic in 2020, Doña Ana is New Mexico's largest majority-Hispanic county.

== Geography ==
According to the U.S. Census Bureau, the county has a total area of 3,814 square miles (9,880 km^{2}), of which 3,808 square miles (9,860 km^{2}) is land and 6.9 square miles (18 km^{2}), or 0.2%, is covered by water.

The county contains a number of prominent geographical features, most notably the Mesilla Valley (the floodplain of the Rio Grande), which runs north to south through the center of the county, and the Organ Mountains, which are located along the county's eastern edge. Other mountain ranges located in the county include the Robledo Mountains, Doña Ana Mountains, Sierra de las Uvas, the southern end of the San Andres Mountains, East Potrillo Mountains, and West Potrillo Mountains. Two small, isolated mountains also exist within the county: Tortugas Mountain (also called A Mountain) to the east of Las Cruces, and Picacho Peak to the west. The county also includes one of New Mexico's four large lava fields, the Aden Malpais, and one of the world's largest maare volcanoes, Kilbourne Hole.

=== Adjacent counties and municipios ===
- Luna County – west
- Sierra County – north
- Otero County – east
- El Paso County, Texas – southeast
- Ascensión, Chihuahua, Mexico – south
- Juárez, Chihuahua, Mexico – south

=== National protected areas ===
- Butterfield Overland National Historic Trail (part)
- El Camino Real de Tierra Adentro National Historic Trail (part)
- Organ Mountains-Desert Peaks National Monument
- Prehistoric Trackways National Monument
- San Andres National Wildlife Refuge
- White Sands National Park (part)

== Demographics ==
Historical population
Census	Pop.	Note	%±
1860	6,239		—
1870	5,864		−6.0%
1880	7,612		29.8%
1890	9,191		20.7%
1900	10,187		10.8%
1910	12,893		26.6%
1920	16,548		28.3%
1930	27,455		65.9%
1940	30,411		10.8%
1950	39,557		30.1%
1960	59,948		51.5%
1970	69,773		16.4%
1980	96,340		38.1%
1990	135,510		40.7%
2000	174,682		28.9%
2010	209,233		19.8%
2020	219,561		4.9%
2025 (est.)	229,091	▲	4.3%
U.S. Decennial Census; 1790–1960 1900–1990; 1990–2000 2010–2020

=== 2020 census ===
As of the 2020 census, the county had a population of 219,561. The median age was 36.0 years, 23.9% of residents were under the age of 18, and 17.3% of residents were 65 years of age or older. For every 100 females there were 95.3 males, and for every 100 females age 18 and over there were 92.7 males age 18 and over.

Doña Ana County, New Mexico – Racial and ethnic composition Note: the US Census treats Hispanic/Latino as an ethnic category. This table excludes Latinos from the racial categories and assigns them to a separate category. Hispanics/Latinos may be of any race.
Race / Ethnicity (NH = Non-Hispanic)	Pop 2000	Pop 2010	Pop 2020	% 2000	% 2010	% 2020
White alone (NH)	56,688	62,992	59,749	32.45%	30.11%	27.21%
Black or African American alone (NH)	2,261	2,825	3,172	1.29%	1.35%	1.44%
Native American or Alaska Native alone (NH)	1,279	1,521	1,463	0.73%	0.73%	0.67%
Asian alone (NH)	1,241	2,029	2,458	0.71%	0.97%	1.12%
Pacific Islander alone (NH)	67	128	115	0.04%	0.06%	0.05%
Other race alone (NH)	608	329	839	0.35%	0.16%	0.38%
Mixed race or Multiracial (NH)	1,873	1,895	4,093	1.07%	0.91%	1.86%
Hispanic or Latino (any race)	110,665	137,514	147,672	63.35%	65.72%	67.26%
Total	174,682	209,233	219,561	100.00%	100.00%	100.00%

The racial makeup of the county was 47.5% White, 1.9% Black or African American, 1.9% American Indian and Alaska Native, 1.2% Asian, 0.1% Native Hawaiian and Pacific Islander, 20.1% from some other race, and 27.4% from two or more races. Hispanic or Latino residents of any race comprised 67.3% of the population.

77.5% of residents lived in urban areas, while 22.5% lived in rural areas.

There were 82,366 households in the county, of which 32.1% had children under the age of 18 living with them and 30.0% had a female householder with no spouse or partner present. About 26.8% of all households were made up of individuals and 11.1% had someone living alone who was 65 years of age or older. There were 89,804 housing units, of which 8.3% were vacant. Among occupied housing units, 64.7% were owner-occupied and 35.3% were renter-occupied. The homeowner vacancy rate was 1.6% and the rental vacancy rate was 8.0%.

=== 2010 U.S. census ===
As of the 2010 United States census, there were 209,233 people, 75,532 households, and 51,863 families residing in the county. The population density was 55.0 inhabitants per square mile (21.2/km^{2}). There were 81,492 housing units at an average density of 21.4 per square mile (8.3/km^{2}). The racial makeup of the county was 74.1% white, 1.7% black or African American, 1.5% American Indian, 1.1% Asian, 0.1% Pacific islander, 18.5% from other races, and 3.0% from two or more races. Those of Hispanic or Latino origin made up 65.7% of the population. In terms of ancestry, 7.3% were German, and 2.2% were American.

Of the 75,532 households, 37.4% had children under the age of 18 living with them, 46.8% were married couples living together, 16.0% had a female householder with no husband present, 31.3% were non-families, and 24.2% of all households were made up of individuals. The average household size was 2.71 and the average family size was 3.25. The median age was 32.4 years.

The median income for a household in the county was $36,657 and the median income for a family was $43,184. Males had a median income of $33,510 versus $25,217 for females. The per capita income for the county was $18,315. About 20.1% of families and 24.5% of the population were below the poverty line, including 34.8% of those under age 18 and 13.6% of those age 65 or over.

=== 2000 U.S. census ===
As of the 2000 United States census, there were 174,682 people, 59,556 households, and 42,939 families residing in the county. The population density was 46 inhabitants per square mile (18/km^{2}). There were 65,210 housing units at an average density of 17 units per square mile (6.6/km^{2}). The racial makeup of the county was 67.8% White, 1.6% Black or African American, 1.5% Native American, 0.8% Asian, 0.1% Pacific Islander, 24.7% from other races, and 3.6% from two or more races. 63.4% of the population were Hispanic or Latino of any race.

There were 59,556 households, out of which 38.4% had children under the age of 18 living with them, 52.4% were married couples living together, 14.7% had a female householder with no husband present, and 27.9% were non-families. 21.3% of all households were made up of individuals, and 6.9% had someone living alone who was 65 years of age or older. The average household size was 2.85 and the average family size was 3.36.

In the county, the population was spread out, with 29.7% under the age of 18, 13.3% from 18 to 24, 27.1% from 25 to 44, 19.3% from 45 to 64, and 10.6% who were 65 years of age or older. The median age was 30 years. For every 100 females there were 96.5 males. For every 100 females age 18 and over, there were 93.5 males.

The median income for a household in the county was $29,808, and the median income for a family was $33,576. Males had a median income of $27,215 versus $20,883 for females. The per capita income for the county was $13,999. 25.4% of the population and 20.2% of families were below the poverty line. Out of the total people living in poverty, 34.4% are under the age of 18 and 12.7% are 65 or older.

== Politics ==
Doña Ana is a Democratic-leaning county in Presidential and Congressional elections. Since 1920, Doña Ana has voted for the candidate who also won statewide, with the only exception being in 2004 when Democrat John Kerry won Doña Ana 51–48%, while Republican George W. Bush won statewide 50–49%. The last Republican to win a majority in the county was George H. W. Bush in 1988.

United States presidential election results for Doña Ana County, New Mexico
Year	Republican		Democratic		Third party(ies)	
Year	No.	%	No.	%	No.	%
1912	912	44.19%	895	43.36%	257	12.45%
1916	1,606	59.35%	1,078	39.84%	22	0.81%
1920	2,627	66.27%	1,318	33.25%	19	0.48%
1924	2,823	58.58%	1,775	36.83%	221	4.59%
1928	3,141	59.06%	2,169	40.79%	8	0.15%
1932	2,354	30.99%	5,133	67.58%	108	1.42%
1936	2,494	30.78%	5,544	68.43%	64	0.79%
1940	3,720	41.63%	5,208	58.28%	8	0.09%
1944	3,149	42.98%	4,172	56.94%	6	0.08%
1948	3,440	40.03%	5,116	59.54%	37	0.43%
1952	5,902	56.33%	4,556	43.48%	20	0.19%
1956	7,025	58.59%	4,918	41.01%	48	0.40%
1960	7,789	46.49%	8,905	53.15%	61	0.36%
1964	7,280	40.25%	10,748	59.43%	57	0.32%
1968	10,824	54.15%	7,658	38.31%	1,508	7.54%
1972	14,562	59.76%	9,416	38.64%	388	1.59%
1976	13,888	53.09%	12,036	46.01%	233	0.89%
1980	15,539	53.92%	10,839	37.61%	2,442	8.47%
1984	22,153	60.87%	13,878	38.13%	362	0.99%
1988	21,582	51.70%	19,608	46.97%	557	1.33%
1992	16,308	36.88%	19,894	44.99%	8,015	18.13%
1996	17,541	40.26%	22,766	52.26%	3,257	7.48%
2000	21,263	45.58%	23,912	51.26%	1,478	3.17%
2004	29,548	47.69%	31,762	51.26%	650	1.05%
2008	28,068	40.51%	40,282	58.14%	930	1.34%
2012	27,322	41.13%	37,139	55.91%	1,962	2.95%
2016	25,374	35.92%	37,947	53.71%	7,327	10.37%
2020	32,802	39.69%	47,957	58.03%	1,882	2.28%
2024	37,594	44.02%	45,937	53.79%	1,876	2.20%

Doña Ana is part of New Mexico's 2nd congressional district, which is currently held by Democrat Gabe Vasquez.

In the State Senate, Doña Ana is part of the 31st, 35th, 36th, 37th, and 38th Senate districts, which currently held by Joe Cervantes, Crystal Brantley, Jeff Steinborn, William Soules and Carrie Hamblen, respectively.

In the State House, Doña Ana is part of the 32nd, 33rd, 34th, 35th, 36th, 37th, 38th, 52nd and 53rd House districts. The current state representatives are Jenifer Jones, Micaela Lara Cadena, Raymundo Lara, Angelica Rubio, Nathan Small, Joanne Ferrary, Tara Jaramillo, Doreen Gallegos and Willie Madrid, respectively.

The current County Commissioners are as follows: Christopher Schaljo-Hernandez (District 1), Gloria Gameros (District 2), Shannon Reynolds (District 3), Susana Chaparro (District 4) and Manuel A. Sanchez (District 5).

== Notable events ==
In January 2012, a federal court awarded former County prisoner Stephen Slevin a $22 million award for inhumane treatment and for keeping him jailed for 2 years without a trial. In a radio interview on the Canadian Broadcasting Corporation program As It Happens broadcast on February 7, 2012, Slevin's lawyer indicated that he was arrested for "DWI". During his incarceration, Slevin was placed in solitary confinement. When his health deteriorated, Slevin was removed to a hospital, but after two weeks in the hospital, he was returned to solitary confinement. The lawyer stated that pictures taken before and after Slevin's time in jail were key to the trial's outcome. The District Attorney for the 3rd Judicial District in Doña Ana County during the 2005–2007 indefinite detention without trial of Mr. Slevin was Susana Martinez, who later became the Governor of New Mexico.

In August 2013, County Clerk Lynn Ellins announced he would begin granting marriage licenses to same-sex couples. Several Republican state legislators vowed to file suit against Ellins in a bid to halt the licenses from being issued. In the aftermath of the 2015 Supreme Court case Obergefell v. Hodges, such controversies have not been raised.

== Communities ==
Map of Doña Ana County

=== Cities ===
- Anthony
- Las Cruces (county seat)
- Sunland Park

=== Town ===
- Mesilla

=== Village ===
- Hatch

=== Census-designated places ===
- Berino
- Butterfield Park
- Chamberino
- Chaparral
- Doña Ana
- Fairacres
- Garfield
- La Mesa
- La Union
- Mesquite
- Organ
- Picacho Hills
- Placitas
- Radium Springs
- Rincon
- Rodey
- Salem
- San Miguel
- San Pablo
- San Ysidro
- Santa Teresa
- Tortugas
- University Park
- Vado
- White Sands

=== Other place ===
- Picacho

=== Ghost towns ===
- Lanark
- Santa Barbara

== Education ==
School districts in the county include:

- Gadsden Independent Schools
- Hatch Valley Public Schools
- Las Cruces Public Schools

== Transportation ==
=== Major highways ===
- I-10 / US 180
- I-25 / US 85 (unsigned)
- US 70
- NM 26
- NM 28
- NM 101
- NM 136
- NM 138
- NM 140
- NM 154
- NM 157
- NM 158
- NM 183
- NM 184
- NM 185
- NM 186
- NM 187
- NM 188
- NM 189
- NM 192
- NM 213
- NM 225
- NM 226
- NM 227
- NM 228
- NM 273
- NM 292
- NM 320
- NM 359
- NM 372
- NM 373
- NM 374
- NM 390
- NM 404
- NM 436
- NM 460
- NM 478
- NM 549

== See also ==
- National Register of Historic Places listings in Doña Ana County, New Mexico
- South Central Regional Transit District
