= South Central Regional Transit District =

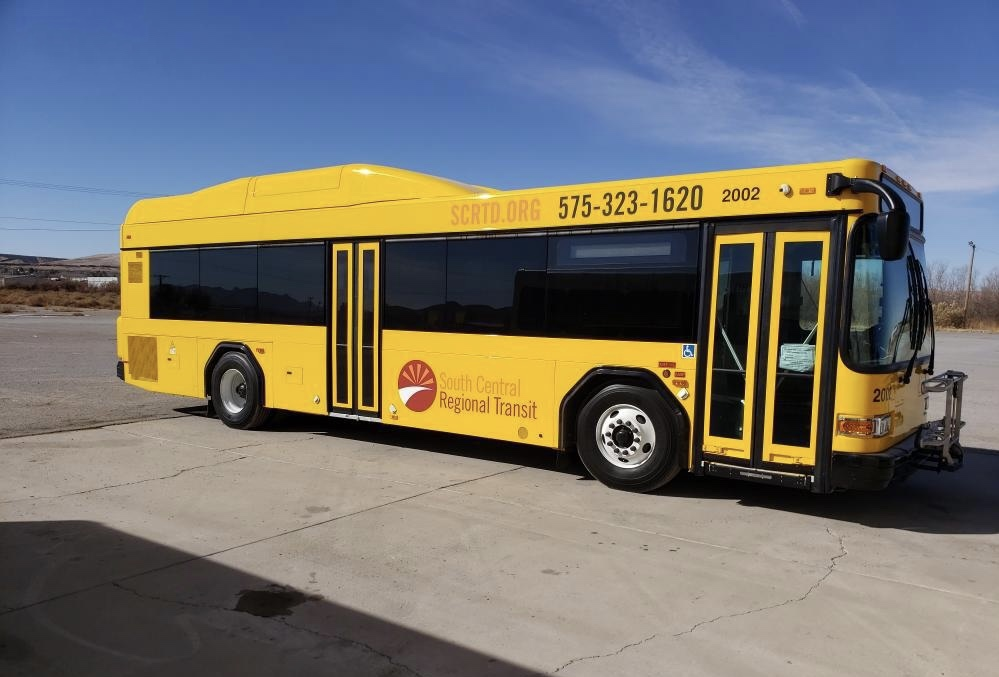
- Hybrid-electric bus

Overview
- Area served: Southern New Mexico and El Paso County
- Locale: 4 Counties
- Transit type: Local and intercity bus, vanpool, passenger rail (proposed)
- Line number: 8 bus lines
- Annual ridership: 101,699 riders from Oct 2022 to Sep 2023
- Chief executive: Manuel A. Sanchez
- Headquarters: Las Cruces, New Mexico
- Website: https://scrtd.org/

Operation
- Began operation: 2016
- Number of vehicles: 24
SCRTD Map
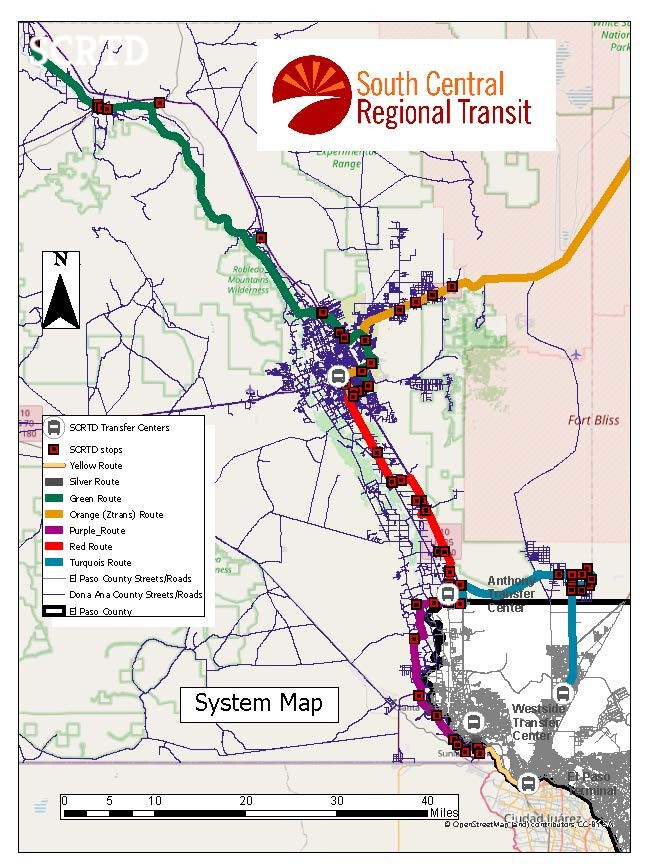

The South Central Regional Transit District (SCRTD) operates a network of several local and intercity bus routes in southern New Mexico, serving Las Cruces, Alamogordo, Hatch/Garfield, Anthony, and Sunland Park, with three connections to El Paso, Texas, as well as serving many smaller communities along a network of eight fixed routes. Routes operate Monday through Friday, except the Yellow Line servicing Sunland Park, which operates Monday through Saturday. All routes are free as of January 5, 2024, until January 1, 2026.

== History ==
The South Central Regional Transit District was created in November 2003 via the Regional Transit District Act signed by Governor Richardson.

Bus services launched in February 2016. In 2016, the district, with a two-year funding agreement with Doña Ana County, initiated transit service on four bus routes from Las Cruces to Sunland Park, Anthony, and Chaparral. Later that year, the district secured a 5311 grant to support the operation of bus service in Dona Ana County and a 5310 grant to enhance the Purple route operating from Anthony to Sunland Park with connections to El Paso's Westside Transit Center. In 2018 transit service frequency increased on three of the four routes and ridership grew by 61 percent. Further, the district updated its Five-Year Financial and Service Plan to reflect new services and grant funding programmed or received.

=== Google Maps ===
SCRTD has collaborated with Google Maps to allow riders to view bus routes and the bus stops on the routes to make navigating the bus routes easier.

=== Expansion ===
In 2017, the District extended service to connect to El Paso County from Chaparral and Sunland Park. With additional funds, service frequency was improved. These actions improved ridership throughout the service area on all bus routes. In collaboration with the City of Sunland Park, SCRTD began operations in Sunland Park and implemented the Yellow Line servicing Sunland Park and connecting to the Downtown Transfer Center in El Paso, Texas.

=== Green energy ===
In 2020, SCRTD purchased two hybrid-electric Gillig buses to service the Yellow Line. These buses are the first hybrid-electric buses to be implemented in southern New Mexico. In 2020, SCRTD installed bus shelters with solar-powered lighting with the aim of creating a safer environment for passengers.

== List of routes ==
Red Line: Mesilla Valley Intermodal Transit Terminal to Anthony, New Mexico Transfer Center

Purple Line: Anthony Transfer Center to Sunland Park City Hall

Yellow Line: Servicing Sunland Park, New Mexico with a connection at the El Paso, Texas Downtown Transfer Center

Silver Line: Sunland Park City Hall to the El Paso Westside Transfer Center

Green Line: Garfield Post Office via Highway 185 to NMSU Gerald Thomas Hall

Turquoise Line: Anthony Transfer Center to El Paso Northgate via Chaparral

Copper Line: Operates from the Greyhound Terminal to the Mesilla Valley Intermodal Transit Terminal located in downtown Las Cruces, New Mexico, to Mesilla, New Mexico
