= New Mexico State Road 228 =

State highway in New Mexico, United States

State Road 228
- NM 228 highlighted in red

Route information
- Maintained by NMDOT
- Length: 1.812 mi (2.916 km)

Major junctions
- West end: NM 192 / NM 478 in Mesquite
- East end: Frontage Road 1035 (FR 1035) near Mesquite

Location
- Country: United States
- State: New Mexico
- Counties: Doña Ana

Highway system
- New Mexico State Highway System; Interstate; US; State; Scenic
← NM 227	→ NM 229

State Road 228 (NM 228) is a 1.8-mile-long (2.9 km) state highway in the US state of New Mexico. NM 228's western terminus is at NM 478 and NM 192 in Mesquite, and the eastern terminus is at Frontage Road 1035 (FR 1035) east of Mesquite.

== Major intersections ==
The entire route is in Doña Ana County.

Location	mi	km	Destinations	Notes
Mesquite	0.000	0.000	NM 192 west / NM 478	Western terminus; eastern terminus of NM 192
	1.812	2.916	FR 1035 To I-10 / US 85 / US 180	Eastern terminus; to I-10, US 85, and US 180 via FR 1035 north
1.000 mi = 1.609 km; 1.000 km = 0.621 mi
