= Interstate 10 in New Mexico =

Highway in New Mexico

Interstate 10
- Pearl Harbor Memorial Highway
- I-10 highlighted in red

Route information
- Maintained by NMDOT
- Length: 164.264 mi (264.357 km)
- Existed: 1957–present
- NHS: Entire route

Major junctions
- West end: I-10 at the Arizona state line near Road Forks
- US 70 from Lordsburg to Las Cruces; US 180 in Deming; I-25 / US 85 in Las Cruces
- East end: I-10 / US 85 / US 180 at the Texas state line in Anthony

Location
- Country: United States
- State: New Mexico
- Counties: Hidalgo, Grant, Luna, Doña Ana

Highway system
- Interstate Highway System; Main; Auxiliary; Suffixed; Business; Future; New Mexico State Highway System; Interstate; US; State; Scenic
← NM 9	→ NM 10

Interstate 10 (I-10) in the US state of New Mexico is a 164.264-mile-long (264.357 km) route of the Interstate Highway System. I-10 traverses southern New Mexico through Hidalgo, Grant, Luna, and Doña Ana counties. The Interstate travels east–west from the Arizona state line to the interchange with I-25 in Las Cruces, and then travels north–south to the Texas state line. US Route 80 (US 80) was replaced by I-10 in the state.

== Route description ==
I-10 enters Hidalgo County, New Mexico from Cochise County, Arizona as a four lane divided highway. The highway travels east through rural southwest New Mexico, passing between Steins Mountain and Attorney Mountain, part of the Peloncillo Mountains, before passing by the ghost town of Steins. Continuing east, the northern terminus of New Mexico State Road 80 (NM 80) is intersected, serving Rodeo, followed by NM 338. Passing Lee Peak, the highway turns southeast, entering Lordsburg. US 70 is intersected in town, and becomes concurrent with the highway as it continues east past the Lordsburg Municipal Airport, before exiting the town. Near the Grant County line, the highway bypasses the ghost town called Shakespeare. Entering Grant County, the highway continues southeast then northeast after intersecting NM 146. The highway passes over the Continental Divide on the Grant–Luna county line. Continuing east, the highway intersects the city of Deming and the highway becomes concurrent with US 180 as the three highways continue east. The highway enters Doña Ana County as it approaches Las Cruces. US 70 exits the highway as it enters the city (becoming Picacho Avenue), and the interstate begins to turn south. Just south of the New Mexico State University campus, I-10 has a junction with the southern terminus of I-25. At the I-25 junction, I-10/US 180 also becomes concurrent with US 85. At this point, the highway is now headed almost due south before crossing into Anthony, Texas (in El Paso County, Texas) from Anthony, New Mexico (in Doña Ana County).

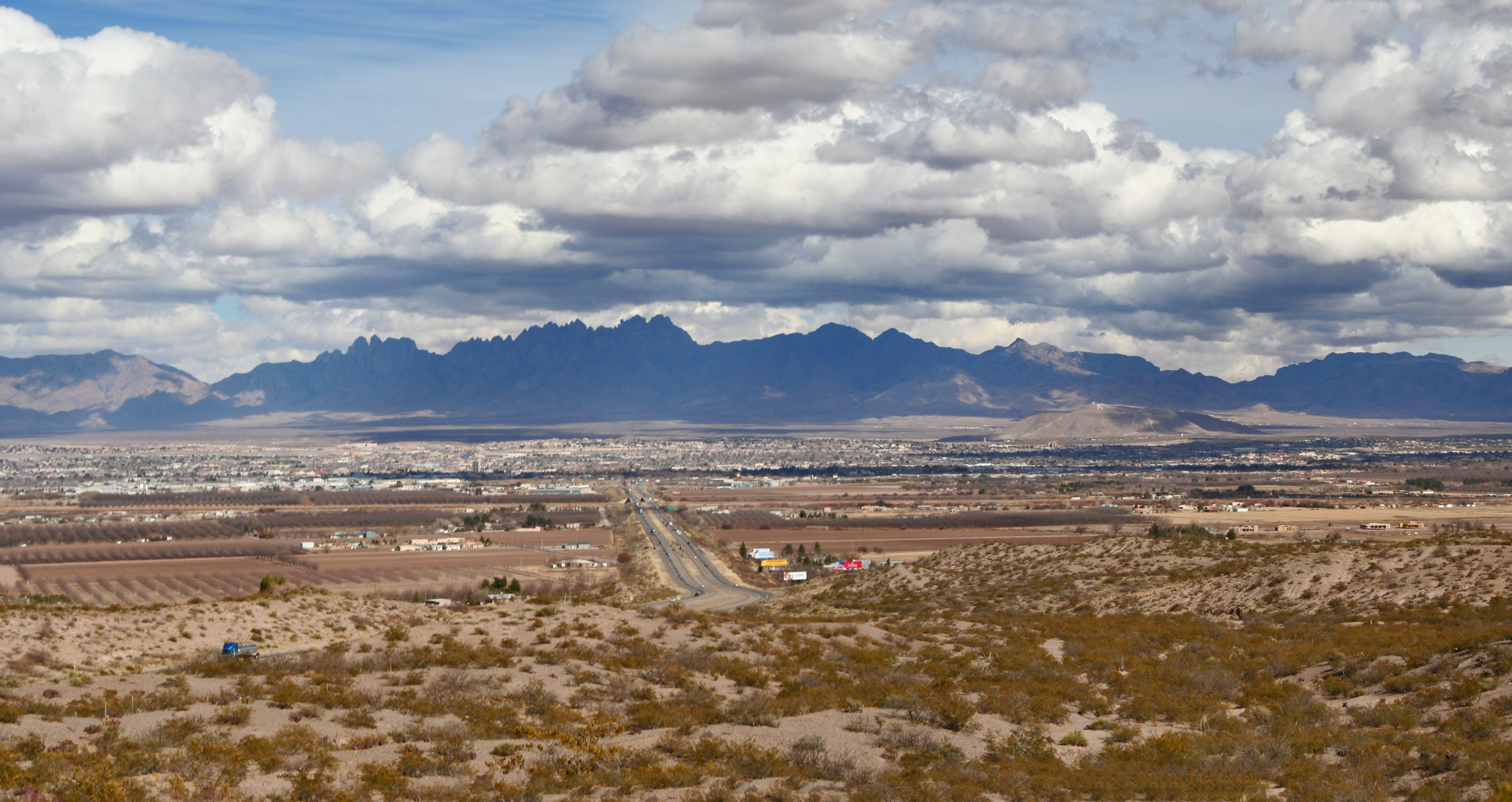
I-10, west of Las Cruces, New Mexico

== History ==
State Road 14
- Location: Arizona–New Mexico state line to Road Forks
- Length: 5 mi (8.0 km)
- Existed: 1927–1960

I-10 replaced US 80 through New Mexico, bypassing major portions of old US 80 in the western portion of the state and in Doña Ana County. US 80 was one of the original United States Numbered Highways established in 1926. The portion of US 80 between the Arizona state line and Anthony was decommissioned on October 6, 1989, while the remainder of the route through the state was removed October 12, 1991.

From 1927 to 1960, the section of I-10 between Road Forks and the Arizona state line was designated New Mexico State Road 14 (NM 14). Though it was only 5 miles (8 km) long, NM 14 and its Arizona counterpart, SR 86, served as a direct bypass for US 80 between Road Forks and Benson, Arizona. US 80 itself looped south to Douglas, Arizona, at the Mexico–US border between Road Forks and Benson. By the late 1940s, NM 14 had been paved and carried the majority of US 80 traffic by 1950. With the advent of I-10, NM 14 was removed from the state road system in 1960.

The interstate was first numbered I-10 by the American Association of State Highway Officials, in cooperation with the Department of Commerce, in 1957.

== Exit list ==
County	Location	mi	km	Exit	Destinations	Notes
Hidalgo		0.000	0.000		I-10 west – Tucson	Continuation into Arizona
Hidalgo		3.630	5.842	3	Steins	
Hidalgo		5.833	9.387	5	NM 80 south – Road Forks	Former US 80 west
Hidalgo		11.200	18.025	11	NM 338 south – Animas	
Hidalgo		15.680	25.235	15	Gary	
Hidalgo	Lordsburg	20.820	33.507	20	New Mexico Information Center / Rest Area I-10 BL east (West Motel Drive)	
Hidalgo	Lordsburg	22.610	36.387	22	NM 494 (Main Street)	
Hidalgo	Lordsburg	24.565– 24.610	39.534– 39.606	24	I-10 BL / US 70 west (E. Motel Drive)	Western end of US 70 concurrency; former US 80 west
Hidalgo		29.556	47.566	29	Ulmorris	Exit does not sign this destination
Hidalgo		34.273	55.157	34	NM 113 south – Playas	
Grant		42.570	68.510	42	Separ	
Grant		49.900	80.306	49	NM 146 south – Hachita, Antelope Wells	
Luna		56.210	90.461	55	Quincy	Exit does not sign this destination
Luna	Gage	63.320	101.904	62	Gage	
Luna		68.570	110.353	68	NM 418 east	Former US 70/US 80
Luna	Deming	81.220	130.711	81	I-10 BL east (W. Pine Street)	
Luna	Deming	82.120	132.159	82A	US 180 west to NM 26 east / I-25 – Silver City, Hatch	Western end of US 180 concurrency
Luna	Deming	82.580	132.900	82B	Cedar Street Railroad Boulevard	Eastbound signage Westbound signage
Luna	Deming	85.240	137.180	85	I-10 BL west (East Pine Street)	
Luna		102.950	165.682	102	Akela	
Doña Ana		116.125	186.885	116	NM 549 west	Former US 70/US 80
Doña Ana		127.230	204.757	127	Corralitos Road	
Doña Ana	Las Cruces	132.031	212.483	132	Las Cruces International Airport	
Doña Ana	Las Cruces	134.637	216.677	135	US 70 east (West Picacho Avenue)	Eastern end of US 70 concurrency
Doña Ana	Las Cruces	138.968	223.647	139	NM 292 south (Motel Boulevard)	
Doña Ana	Las Cruces	140.215	225.654	140	NM 28 (Avenida de Mesilla)	
Doña Ana	Las Cruces	141.552– 141.827	227.806– 228.248	142	NM 478 (Main Street) / NM 101 west (University Avenue) / Valley Drive ( NM 188)	Valley Drive not signed eastbound; NM 478 (Main Street) not signed westbound; NM 478 is former US 80/US 85
Doña Ana	Las Cruces	144.349– 144.650	232.307– 232.792	144	I-25 north (US 85) – Las Cruces, Albuquerque	Western end of US 85 concurrency; southern terminus of I-25
Doña Ana		151.200	243.333	151	NM 228 – Mesquite	
Doña Ana		154.950	249.368	155	NM 227 west – Vado, Berino	
Doña Ana		160.400	258.139	162	NM 404 – Anthony, Chaparral	
Doña Ana		164.264	264.357		I-10 east / US 180 east / US 85 south – El Paso	Continuation into Anthony, Texas
1.000 mi = 1.609 km; 1.000 km = 0.621 mi: Concurrency terminus

== See also ==
- Business routes of Interstate 10

Interstate 10
Previous state: Arizona	New Mexico	Next state: Texas
