= New Mexico State Road 292 =

State highway in New Mexico, United States

State Road 292
- Calle De El Paso

Route information
- Maintained by NMDOT
- Length: 1.450 mi (2.334 km)

Major junctions
- South end: NM 28 (Avenida de Mesilla) in Mesilla
- North end: I-10 / US 180 in Las Cruces

Location
- Country: United States
- State: New Mexico
- Counties: Doña Ana

Highway system
- New Mexico State Highway System; Interstate; US; State; Scenic
← NM 291	→ NM 293

State Road 292 (NM 292) is a 1.45-mile-long (2.33 km) state highway in the US state of New Mexico. NM 292's southern terminus is at NM 28 (Avenida de Mesilla) in Mesilla, and its northern terminus is at Interstate 10 (I-10) and U.S. Route 180 (US 180) in Las Cruces. It continues north at its northern terminus as North Motel Boulevard to US 70.

== Major intersections ==
The entire route is in Doña Ana County.

Location	mi	km	Destinations	Notes
Mesilla	0.000	0.000	NM 28 (Avenida de Mesilla)	Southern terminus
Las Cruces	1.450	2.334	I-10 / US 180	Northern terminus, I-10 exit 139
Las Cruces	1.450	2.334	North Motel Boulevard; To US 70	Continues north as North Motel Boulevard to US 70
1.000 mi = 1.609 km; 1.000 km = 0.621 mi
