= Gage, New Mexico =

Coordinates: 32°13′46″N 108°05′10″W

Gage is an unincorporated community in western Luna County, New Mexico, United States. It is found on Interstate 10/U.S. Route 70, twenty miles west of Deming.
