= Blackdom, New Mexico =

- Ghost town
- Location within the state of New Mexico Blackdom (the United States)
- Coordinates: 33°09′49″N 104°30′32″W
- Country: United States
- State: New Mexico
- County: Chaves

Area
  - Total: 24 sq mi (61 km^{2})
- Elevation: 3,638 ft (1,109 m)

Population (1908)
  - Total: 300
  - Density: 13/sq mi (4.9/km^{2})
- Time zone: UTC-7 (Mountain (MST))
  - Summer (DST): UTC-6 (MDT)

Blackdom is a historic freedom colony in Chaves County, New Mexico, United States with a population of 300 at its height in 1908 that was founded by African-American settlers in 1901 and abandoned in the mid-1920s. Founded by Frank and Ella Boyer under the requirements of the Homestead Act, the town experienced significant growth in its early years, with settlers from throughout the United States moving to the community. A drought starting in 1916 caused many of the settlers to relocate and the town became uninhabited in 1921. It is now considered a ghost town.

== History ==
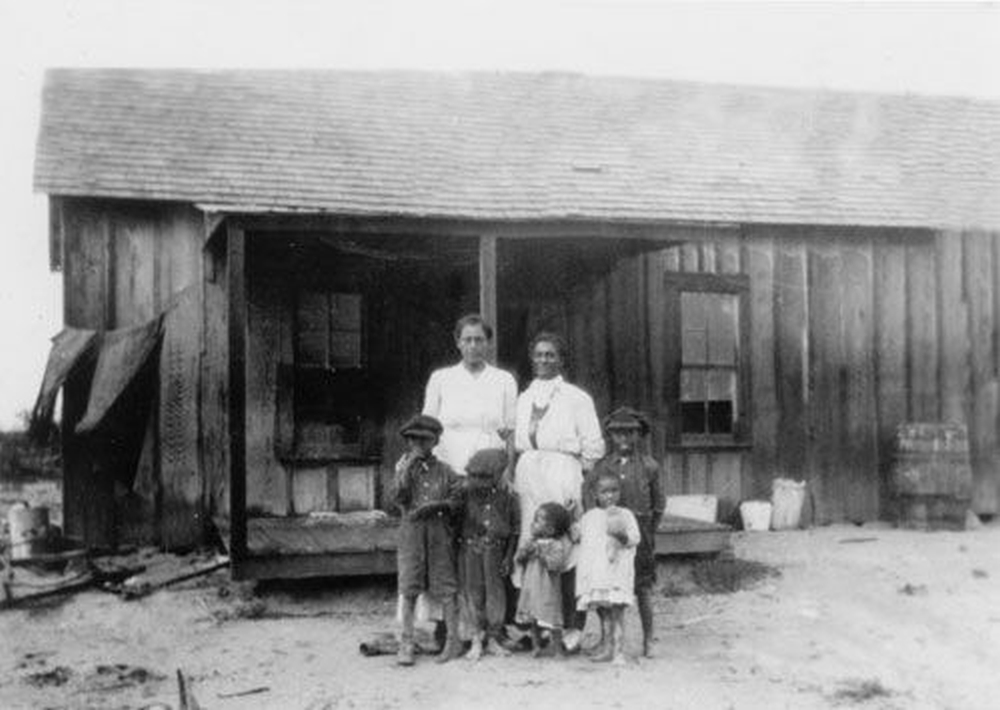
Family in front of their home in Blackdom

Henry Boyer, a Morehouse College educated freedman from Pullam, Georgia, was a wagoner with the army units of Stephen W. Kearny during the Mexican–American War in 1846. Henry's son, Frank Boyer, was raised hearing stories from his father about New Mexico before also being educated at Morehouse and Fisk universities. While at university, he learned about the legal requirements for homesteading. Frank started teaching in Georgia and soon married Ella Louise Boyer (née McGruder), herself a teacher graduated from the Haines Institute.

Frank began encouraging African-Americans to report and challenge abuses in the Jim Crow-era South. When his life was threatened by the Ku Klux Klan, Frank's father encouraged him to move to the West for his safety. In 1896, Frank traveled to New Mexico on foot with two students, Daniel Keyes (who married Ella's sister Willie Frances) and one with the last name of Ragsdale, picking up day labor work along the way. Ella and their four children followed in 1901. Frank's idea was to establish a self-sustaining community which would be free from the hindrances that existed in the South.

The community of Blackdom was officially incorporated by 1901, centering largely around Frank and Ella Boyer's home. Frank advertised in newspapers for African-American homesteaders to join the community and by 1908, the community had 25 families with about 300 people and a number of businesses (including a blacksmith shop, a hotel, a weekly newspaper, and a Baptist church) on 15,000 acres (61 km^{2}) of land. W.T. Malone, the first African American to pass the New Mexico Bar exam, was one of the early settlers from Mississippi. The community was the first solely African-American community in the New Mexico Territory.

The year 1916 saw worms infest many of the crops, alkali buildup in the soil, and the sudden depletion of the natural wells of the Artesia aquifer that had provided most of the water for the farms. Settlers began leaving the area, moving to Roswell, Dexter, and Las Cruces. In 1921, the Boyers' house was foreclosed upon and the family relocated to Vado.

Blackdom was officially incorporated in 1921. Blackdom was to be 40 acres and 166 lots in the original plan. However, by the time it was recognized as a town, most of the population had relocated because of the water problems. There are no structures remaining in Blackdom, with the exception for the barely visible concrete foundation of the school-house. The Blackdom Baptist Church building was sold in the 1920s and moved to the town of Cottonwood in Eddy County, where it is now a private home.

Juneteenth celebrations in the community were well-known, and many white ranchers in the area were invited to the community for a large festival and baseball game.

== Geography ==
The Blackdom site is located eight miles (13 km) west of Dexter and 18 miles (29 km) south of Roswell. The altitude is 3,638 feet (1,109 m).

== Legacy ==
October 26, 2002, was proclaimed Blackdom Day by the governor of New Mexico, and a historical marker was erected at a rest stop on Highway 285, between Roswell and Artesia. Former Blackdom residents and descendants of settlers were present for the dedication ceremony. Archeological examinations of the homestead have been directed by the New Mexico State Highway and Transportation Authority.

In 2022, an exhibition was held at New Mexico State University's University Art Museum titled Four Sites of Return: Ritual, Remembrance, Reparation & Reclamation, featuring a recorded performance of music and dance in Blackdom in the style of early Blackdom performed by a collective of Black artists.
