= Incarceration of Stephen Slevin =

Jail mistreatment incident

- Stephen Slevin before and after his time in solitary confinement
- Date: August 24, 2005 - June 25, 2007
- Location: Dona Ana County, New Mexico
- Type: Negligence
- Perpetrator: Doña Ana County jail
- Arrests: Stephen Slevin
- Accused: Daniel Zemek, Chris Barela
- Litigation: Lawsuit filed in 2007, settled for $15.5 million on March 6, 2013

In August 2005, 58-year old Stephen Slevin, a resident of Dona Ana County, New Mexico, was arrested on the charges of driving under the influence, possession of a stolen vehicle, and several other counts. Slevin spent 22 months in the Doña Ana County jail, until his release in 2007, during which time he was placed in solitary confinement due to concerns of him being suicidal.

During Slevin's time in solitary confinement, he was ignored by prison staff and received almost no medical care, which led to him being unaware of his surroundings, becoming malnourished, developing bedsores, dental problems, and fungal skin infections due to lack of showers. On June 25, 2007, Slevin was released from jail after his charges were dismissed. Slevin, together with his lawyer Matthew Coyte sued the jail and two of its employees for violation of Slevin's constitutional rights. On March 6, 2013, the lawsuit was settled for $15 million, making it one of the largest payouts to prisoners for violations of their civil rights in the United States. Following the incident, county commissioners of Doña Ana County stated that changes were implemented at the county jail to improve prisoner's healthcare.

== Incident ==
=== Arrest ===
On August 24, 2005, 58-year old Stephen Slevin, a resident of Dona Ana County, New Mexico, was pulled over and arrested on the charges of driving under the influence, possession of a stolen vehicle, driving with a suspended licence, possession of alcohol in a vehicle and improper use of registration. According to Doña Ana County officials, Slevin had an extensive criminal record by the time of his arrest and had been convicted multiple times in other states for robberies, burglaries, driving under the influence, drug possession, and firearms violations. Slevin was suffering from depression but was physically healthy at that time.

=== Incarceration and release ===
Stephen Slevin was transported to Doña Ana County jail, where it was determined that he was depressed and at risk of committing suicide. For this reason, he was put in solitary confinement. Slevin spent three days in a padded cell before being moved to a regular solitary confinement cell. He never appeared before a judge, and no hearings took place for his charges throughout his time in jail. Two weeks after being taken into custody, Slevin was transferred to another jail for a psychiatric evaluation, then returned to the Doña Ana County jail and placed in solitary confinement. A year into his incarceration, a brief hearing was held regarding Slevin’s mental competence. Slevin was sent to New Mexico Behavioral Health Institute in Las Vegas in May 2007 where it was determined that he lost third of his body weight. Slevin was able to take a shower and shave off his grown-out beard, which improved his mood; however, two weeks later, he was returned to solitary confinement in the Doña Ana County jail, and his mental state deteriorated further.

While in solitary confinement, Slevin developed fungal skin infections due lack of showers and had toenails grown so long that they curled around his foot. He became malnourished, lost significant amount of weight, developed bedsores and dental problems, resorting to pulling his own tooth as he was unable to see a dentist. Slevin eventually fell into a state of delirium, becoming unaware of his surroundings. According to Slevin’s lawyer, Matthew Coyte, Slevin reached out to prison staff for help with his mental health issues, but was ignored. Slevin sent more than ten letters to the prison nurse, who had no degree in psychology, complaining that he had been unable to sleep for several days and was suffering from deep depression. After sending her letters for a few months, Slevin wrote in one of them: “I don’t know how much longer I can go on”, and, according to Coyte, it was the moment he fell into a delirium. Slevin was allowed to leave his cell only a couple of times a month, though there were periods when he did not leave it for four months at a time. Reportedly, he suffered five panic attacks per day.

On June 25, 2007, after 22 months of incarceration, Slevin was released from jail after the judge declared him "incompetent and not dangerous" and dropped his charges. He moved from New Mexico to an undisclosed location and had received support from his family. Shortly after his release, Slevin was diagnosed with advanced lung cancer, which was unrelated to his time in jail. He also began to exhibit symptoms associated with post-traumatic stress disorder.

== Aftermath ==
=== Lawsuit ===
After his release, Stephen Slevin together with his public defender Matthew Coyte filed a federal lawsuit against the jail, Doña Ana County Board of Commisoners, and two jail staff members for violation of Slevin's constitutional rights. Doña Ana County tried to settle the lawsuit for $25,000, but the offer was rejected. On January 24, 2012, a jury awarded Slevin $22 million, however, Doña Ana County appealed the decision, alleging that the award was excessive, and filed a motion for a new trial. In its statement, the county justified its treatment of Slevin, stating that he had refused to join the general inmate population, leaving the jail with no other choice but to segregate him.

In December 2012, federal judge Martha Vázquez in Santa Fe ruled that the award will not be reduced as it was "justified by the evidence" and that no new trial would be held. On March 6, 2013 Slevin agreed to a $15.5 million settlement to avoid further legal battles with the county. In addition, Slevin received $3.5 million in punitive damages from jail’s former medical director Daniel Zemek and $3 million in punitive damages from jail director Chris Barela. In a statement, Doña Ana County said it would not been able to pay $22 million to Slevin and that the award was excessive. Slevin said he filed the lawsuit not for the sake of money, but to make a statement about the conditions of his incarceration. Slevin died of cancer after the trial had concluded.

=== Responses ===
Stephen Slevin's public defender Matthew Coyte described the incident as "the worst case of solitary confinement in the country". Both him and Slevin said that they hope the case would help put an end to the practice of solitary confinement in the United States. In an interview, Matthew Coit remarked: "Other countries recognize it as a form of torture, whereas America uses it as a routine method of incarceration".

In 2013, Las Cruces Sun-News described the case as a "sad saga" and noted that $9.5 million of the total $15.5 million settlement would be paid by the county’s taxpayers. It said that its ironic that the payment caused by county's negligence of mentally ill inmates could jeopardize plans to establish a crisis intervention center designed to address that issue. In 2015, Marisa Demarco of KUNM described the case as the "most famous example" of mentally ill people costing counties millions of dollars.

A joint 2016 report by the New Mexico Center on Law and Poverty and the American Civil Liberties Union stated that the case "made headlines around the world" and made Stephen Slevin the "poster child for the abuse of solitary confinement" in the United States. In 2018, editorial board of Las Cruces Sun-News said that many residents of Las Cruces, New Mexico know about Stephen Slevin.

Board of County Commissioners said that it "deeply regrets the harm Mr. Slevin suffered during this period". The county stated that changes were implemented at the county jail aimed at improving inmates' access to medical care and mental health services. It further stated that it has developed plans to create a crisis triage center that will "help stabilize mentally-ill persons who have committed no crimes but who represent a danger to themselves or others in the eyes of law-enforcement professionals". Dona Ana County public information officer Williams told NBC News that the jail has created "dedicated wings of the building, one for males, one for females, that are totally dedicated for closely supervised mental health provisions and care", however, he noted that no jail staff members had been fired over treatment of Slevin.
