= Santa Teresa High School (New Mexico) =

Public school in Santa Teresa, New Mexico

Location
- 100 Airport Road, Santa Teresa, NM, 88008
- 31°51′45″N 106°39′06″W

Information
- School district: Gadsden Independent Schools
- Grades: 9–12
- Enrollment: 1,154 (2024–25)
- Website: sths.gisd.k12.nm.us

Santa Teresa High School is a public high school in Santa Teresa, New Mexico. A part of the Gadsden Independent Schools, it served 1,154 students in the 2024–25 academic year.

It had a graduation rate of 94.5% in 2025.

== History ==
In 2016, the executive director of the Camino Real Regional Utility Authority, Brent Westmoreland, stated that they had a high level of assurance that there was arsenic in the water in the schools in Santa Teresa, a common issue for schools in southern New Mexico. The statement was later recanted.

The school had to temporarily move to virtual classes in December 2022 after a nearby sewer line was blocked.

== Athletics ==
Santa Teresa High School participates in the 4A division of baseball, having most recently qualified for the playoffs in 2026.

In basketball, the school was coached by Bob Haack from 2006 to 2014, which included a state championship in the 4A division in 2012. Haack died in 2016 after a battle with cancer.

The school also has a volleyball team. In 2020, the team had to quarantine after the head coach had tested positive for COVID-19.
