= San Miguel, New Mexico =

- Census-designated place
- Location within New Mexico
- Coordinates: 32°09′12″N 106°43′37″W
- Country: United States
- State: New Mexico
- County: Doña Ana

Area
  - Total: 2.29 sq mi (5.93 km^{2})
  - Land: 2.29 sq mi (5.93 km^{2})
  - Water: 0 sq mi (0.00 km^{2})
- Elevation: 3,839 ft (1,170 m)

Population (2020)
  - Total: 975
  - Density: 425.7/sq mi (164.35/km^{2})
- Time zone: UTC-7 (Mountain (MST))
  - Summer (DST): UTC-6 (MDT)
- ZIP code: 88058
- Area code: 575
- GNIS feature ID: 2584210

San Miguel is a census-designated place in Doña Ana County, New Mexico, United States. As of the 2020 census, San Miguel had a population of 975. San Miguel has a post office with ZIP code 88058. The community is located at the junction of state routes 28 and 192.

== Geography ==
According to the U.S. Census Bureau, the community has an area of 2.288 square miles (5.93 km^{2}), all land.

== Demographics ==
Historical population
Census	Pop.	Note	%±
2020	975		—
U.S. Decennial Census

== Education ==
The Gadsden Independent School District operates public schools, including North Valley Elementary School. The designated High School(s) for this area would either be Gadsden High School or Alta Vista Early College High School.
