= Mesquite, New Mexico =

- Census-designated place
- Location of Mesquite, New Mexico
- Coordinates: 32°10′01″N 106°41′19″W
- Country: United States
- State: New Mexico
- County: Dona Ana

Area
  - Total: 0.82 sq mi (2.12 km^{2})
  - Land: 0.82 sq mi (2.12 km^{2})
  - Water: 0 sq mi (0.00 km^{2})
- Elevation: 3,839 ft (1,170 m)

Population (2020)
  - Total: 984
  - Density: 1,201.7/sq mi (463.96/km^{2})
- Time zone: UTC-7 (Mountain (MST))
  - Summer (DST): UTC-6 (MDT)
- ZIP code: 88048
- Area code: 575
- FIPS code: 35-48270
- GNIS feature ID: 2408823

Mesquite is an unincorporated community and census-designated place (CDP) in Doña Ana County, New Mexico, United States. As of the 2020 census, Mesquite had a population of 984. It is part of the Las Cruces Metropolitan Statistical Area.

== History ==
Mesquite was established and named by executives of the Santa Fe Railroad after brush which grew profusely along the tracks. The persistent desert shrub had long been a feature of the landscape. In 1847 a military detachment left El Paso, Texas, on an expedition against the Apaches. Before leaving the saloon of El Paso, where "Pass Whiskey" was plentiful, they armed themselves with a supply. By the second day out, a portion of the party where so befuddled that they got lost in the jungle of mesquite that grew in the area. When they finally found their way back to the main body of troops, their Commander ordered them to make camp, confiscating the rest of their whiskey, and gave them the remainder of the day to sober up.

== Geography ==
Mesquite is located in southeastern Doña Ana County in the Mesilla Valley, on the east side of the Rio Grande. Interstate 10 passes just east of the CDP, with access from Exit 151. I-10 leads northwest 13 miles (21 km) to Las Cruces, the county seat, and southeast 35 miles (56 km) to El Paso, Texas.

According to the United States Census Bureau, the Mesquite CDP has a total area of 0.81 square miles (2.1 km^{2}), all land.

== Demographics ==
Historical population
Census	Pop.	Note	%±
2020	984		—
U.S. Decennial Census

As of the census of 2000, there were 948 people, 262 households, and 227 families residing in the CDP. The population density was 1,148.2 inhabitants per square mile (443.3/km^{2}). There were 276 housing units at an average density of 334.3 per square mile (129.1/km^{2}). The racial makeup of the CDP was 65.30% White, 0.42% African American, 0.84% Native American, 0.11% Asian, 29.01% from other races, and 4.32% from two or more races. Hispanic or Latino of any race were 94.83% of the population.

There were 262 households, out of which 54.2% had children under the age of 18 living with them, 65.3% were married couples living together, 16.8% had a female householder with no husband present, and 13.0% were non-families. 9.5% of all households were made up of individuals, and 3.4% had someone living alone who was 65 years of age or older. The average household size was 3.62 and the average family size was 3.86.

In the CDP, the population was spread out, with 38.1% under the age of 18, 13.4% from 18 to 24, 26.2% from 25 to 44, 14.9% from 45 to 64, and 7.5% who were 65 years of age or older. The median age was 24 years. For every 100 females, there were 95.1 males. For every 100 females age 18 and over, there were 90.6 males.

The median income for a household in the CDP was $21,875, and the median income for a family was $21,458. Males had a median income of $20,370 versus $15,577 for females. The per capita income for the CDP was $7,129. About 38.4% of families and 43.4% of the population were below the poverty line, including 49.7% of those under age 18 and 15.9% of those age 65 or over.

== Education ==
The Gadsden Independent School District operates public schools, including Mesquite Elementary School, and the designated high schools would either be Gadsden High School or Alta Vista Early College High School.
