= La Mesa, New Mexico =

- Census-designated place
- Location within New Mexico
- Coordinates: 32°07′36″N 106°42′40″W
- Country: United States
- State: New Mexico
- County: Doña Ana

Area
  - Total: 2.37 sq mi (6.15 km^{2})
  - Land: 2.37 sq mi (6.15 km^{2})
  - Water: 0 sq mi (0.00 km^{2})
- Elevation: 3,826 ft (1,166 m)

Population (2020)
  - Total: 649
  - Density: 273.5/sq mi (105.58/km^{2})
- Time zone: UTC-7 (Mountain (MST))
  - Summer (DST): UTC-6 (MDT)
- ZIP code: 88044
- Area code: 575
- GNIS feature ID: 2584130

La Mesa is a census-designated place and unincorporated community in Doña Ana County, New Mexico, United States. As of the 2020 census, La Mesa had a population of 649. La Mesa has a post office with ZIP code 88044. NM 28 passes through the community.

== Demographics ==
Historical population
Census	Pop.	Note	%±
2020	649		—
U.S. Decennial Census
