= Vado, New Mexico =

Place and community in the United States

- Census-designated place
- Location of Vado, New Mexico
- Coordinates: 32°07′30″N 106°39′22″W
- Country: United States
- State: New Mexico
- County: Dona Ana
- Settled: 1886

Area
  - Total: 2.98 sq mi (7.71 km^{2})
  - Land: 2.98 sq mi (7.71 km^{2})
  - Water: 0 sq mi (0.00 km^{2})
- Elevation: 3,826 ft (1,166 m)

Population (2020)
  - Total: 2,930
  - Density: 983.9/sq mi (379.87/km^{2})
- Time zone: UTC-7 (Mountain (MST))
  - Summer (DST): UTC-6 (MDT)
- ZIP codes: 88048, 88072
- Area code: 575
- FIPS code: 35-81590
- GNIS feature ID: 2409386

Vado is an unincorporated community and census-designated place (CDP) in Doña Ana County, New Mexico, United States. As of the 2020 census, Vado had a population of 2,930. The ZIP code for Vado is 88072, its area code is 575, and it is part of the Las Cruces Metropolitan Statistical Area.

== History ==
Founded in 1920 by Francis “Frank” Marion Boyer and his wife Ella Louise, after the previous freedom colony they founded, Blackdom, New Mexico, became a ghost town due to water well issues.

== Geography ==
Vado is located in southeastern Doña Ana County in the Mesilla Valley, on the east side of the Rio Grande. Interstate 10 forms the eastern edge of the CDP, with access from Exit 155. I-10 leads north 17 miles (27 km) to Las Cruces, the county seat, and south 32 miles (51 km) to El Paso, Texas.

According to the United States Census Bureau, the CDP has a total area of 3.0 square miles (7.7 km^{2}), all land.

== Demographics ==
Historical population
Census	Pop.	Note	%±
2020	2,930		—
U.S. Decennial Census

=== 2020 census ===
As of the 2020 census, Vado had a population of 2,930. The median age was 32.5 years. 29.2% of residents were under the age of 18 and 12.7% of residents were 65 years of age or older. For every 100 females there were 96.4 males, and for every 100 females age 18 and over there were 90.9 males age 18 and over.

0.0% of residents lived in urban areas, while 100.0% lived in rural areas.

There were 867 households in Vado, of which 40.9% had children under the age of 18 living in them. Of all households, 51.3% were married-couple households, 14.5% were households with a male householder and no spouse or partner present, and 27.8% were households with a female householder and no spouse or partner present. About 17.4% of all households were made up of individuals and 8.8% had someone living alone who was 65 years of age or older.

There were 935 housing units, of which 7.3% were vacant. The homeowner vacancy rate was 0.3% and the rental vacancy rate was 11.8%.

Racial composition as of the 2020 census
Race	Number	Percent
White	872	29.8%
Black or African American	9	0.3%
American Indian and Alaska Native	35	1.2%
Asian	3	0.1%
Native Hawaiian and Other Pacific Islander	1	0.0%
Some other race	870	29.7%
Two or more races	1,140	38.9%
Hispanic or Latino (of any race)	2,814	96.0%

=== 2000 census ===
As of the census of 2000, there were 3,003 people, 776 households, and 709 families residing in the CDP. The population density was 1,013.8 inhabitants per square mile (391.4/km^{2}). There were 814 housing units at an average density of 274.8 per square mile (106.1/km^{2}). The racial makeup of the CDP was 53.98% White, 1.03% African American, 1.50% Native American, 0.07% Asian, 39.93% from other races, and 3.50% from two or more races. Hispanic or Latino of any race were 95.00% of the population.

There were 776 households, out of which 61.0% had children under the age of 18 living with them, 68.6% were married couples living together, 16.9% had a female householder with no husband present, and 8.6% were non-families. 7.0% of all households were made up of individuals, and 3.0% had someone living alone who was 65 years of age or older. The average household size was 3.87 and the average family size was 4.03.

In the CDP, the population was spread out, with 39.2% under the age of 18, 11.6% from 18 to 24, 26.7% from 25 to 44, 16.1% from 45 to 64, and 6.4% who were 65 years of age or older. The median age was 24 years. For every 100 females, there were 100.3 males. For every 100 females age 18 and over, there were 94.7 males.

The median income for a household in the CDP was $23,538, and the median income for a family was $24,136. Males had a median income of $16,335 versus $15,121 for females. The per capita income for the CDP was $6,323. About 32.8% of families and 34.0% of the population were below the poverty line, including 46.2% of those under age 18 and 24.4% of those age 65 or over.

== Education ==
The Gadsden Independent School District operates public schools, including Vado Elementary School, the designated high school for this area would be Gadsden High School. or Alta Vista Early College High School.
