= Chamberino, New Mexico =

- Census-designated place
- Location within New Mexico
- Coordinates: 32°02′11″N 106°40′39″W
- Country: United States
- State: New Mexico
- County: Doña Ana

Area
  - Total: 3.06 sq mi (7.92 km^{2})
  - Land: 3.06 sq mi (7.92 km^{2})
  - Water: 0 sq mi (0.00 km^{2})
- Elevation: 3,803 ft (1,159 m)

Population (2020)
  - Total: 736
  - Density: 240.7/sq mi (92.92/km^{2})
- Time zone: UTC-7 (Mountain (MST))
  - Summer (DST): UTC-6 (MDT)
- ZIP code: 88027
- Area code: 575
- GNIS feature ID: 2584072

Chamberino is an unincorporated community and census-designated place (CDP) in Doña Ana County, New Mexico, United States. As of the 2020 census, Chamberino had a population of 736. A post office was established at Chamberino in 1880; although it was suppressed two years later, it was reëstablished in 1893 and continues to the present day. The ZIP code is 88027.

== Demographics ==
Historical population
Census	Pop.	Note	%±
2020	736		—
U.S. Decennial Census

== Notable people ==
- Sam Donaldson, ABC News journalist, grew up on the family farm in Chamberino.
- J. Paul Taylor, New Mexico legislator and educator, was born in Chamberino.
