= Berino, New Mexico =

- Census-designated place
- Location within New Mexico
- Coordinates: 32°04′15″N 106°37′17″W
- Country: United States
- State: New Mexico
- County: Doña Ana

Area
  - Total: 0.94 sq mi (2.43 km^{2})
  - Land: 0.94 sq mi (2.43 km^{2})
  - Water: 0 sq mi (0.00 km^{2})
- Elevation: 3,832 ft (1,168 m)

Population (2020)
  - Total: 1,651
  - Density: 1,756.9/sq mi (678.33/km^{2})
- Time zone: UTC-7 (Mountain (MST))
  - Summer (DST): UTC-6 (MDT)
- Area code: 575
- GNIS feature ID: 920560

Berino is a census-designated place in Doña Ana County, New Mexico, United States. Berino is located along Interstate 10, 23 miles (37 km) south of Las Cruces. As of the 2020 census, Berino had a population of 1,651. The village of Berino is populated to 98% by Hispanics.

The church of the small New Mexican community is called the Mission de la Inmaculada Concepción.

In early April 1932, a local rancher Melquiades (sic) Espinosa was arrested after the bodies of his wife and six children were found murdered.

== Demographics ==
Historical population
Census	Pop.	Note	%±
2020	1,651		—
U.S. Decennial Census
