= La Union, New Mexico =

- Census-designated place
- Location within New Mexico
- Coordinates: 31°57′03″N 106°39′44″W
- Country: United States
- State: New Mexico
- County: Doña Ana

Area
  - Total: 4.14 sq mi (10.73 km^{2})
  - Land: 4.14 sq mi (10.73 km^{2})
  - Water: 0 sq mi (0.00 km^{2})
- Elevation: 3,803 ft (1,159 m)

Population (2020)
  - Total: 997
  - Density: 240.7/sq mi (92.93/km^{2})
- Time zone: UTC-7 (Mountain (MST))
  - Summer (DST): UTC-6 (MDT)
- Area code: 575
- GNIS feature ID: 2584137

La Union is a census-designated place in Doña Ana County, New Mexico, United States. As of the 2020 census, La Union had a population of 997. NM 182 connects the community to NM 28. It is a part of the El Paso–Las Cruces combined statistical area.

== History ==
In 2021, La Union was struck by torrential floods that were described as a '1000-year flooding event'. This led to the breaking of a dam, which ravaged the local infrastructure. As a result, the county government and Governor of New Mexico Michelle Lujan Grisham announced funding on improvements on town and dam infrastructure.

== Geography ==
According to the U.S. Census Bureau, the community has an area of 0.979 square miles (2.54 km^{2}), all land.

== Demographics ==
Historical population
Census	Pop.	Note	%±
2020	997		—
U.S. Decennial Census

As of the 2020 Census, the population of La Union was 997.

== Education ==
La Union Elementary School is administered by Gadsden Independent School District and operates as a public school up to grade 6. The school colors are green and yellow. The school mascot is the lion. "La Union Lions" are the sports team of La Union Elementary School.

== Local attractions ==
- La Viña Winery
- La Union Maze
- Juan de Oñate Trail
