= U.S. Route 85 =

Highway in the United States

U.S. Route 85
- CanAm Highway
- US 85 highlighted in red

Route information
- Length: 1,480 mi (2,380 km)
- Existed: 1926–present

Major junctions
- South end: US 62 at the Stanton Street Bridge at the Mexican border in El Paso, TX
- I-10 at El Paso, TX; I-10 / I-25 at Las Cruces, NM; I-40 at Albuquerque, NM; I-25 / I-70 at Denver, CO; I-270 at Commerce City, CO; I-76 near Derby, CO; US 34 at Greeley, CO; I-80 at Cheyenne, WY; I-90 at Spearfish, SD; I-94 at Belfield, ND
- North end: Highway 35 at Canada–US border near Fortuna, ND

Location
- Country: United States
- States: Texas, New Mexico, Colorado, Wyoming, South Dakota, North Dakota

Highway system
- United States Numbered Highway System; List; Special; Divided
← US 84	→ US 87

U.S. Route 85 (US 85) is a 1,479-mile-long (2,380 km) north–south United States Highway that travels in the Mountain and Northern Plains states of the United States. The southern terminus of the highway is at the Mexican border in El Paso, Texas, connecting with Mexican Federal Highway 45. The northern terminus is at the Canadian border north of Fortuna, North Dakota, where the route continues north as Saskatchewan Highway 35. The highway route is part of the CanAm Highway. Sections of US 85 are designated as the Theodore Roosevelt Expressway.

== Route description ==
Lengths
	mi	km
TX	21	34
NM	483	777
CO	310	499
WY	257	413
SD	154	248
ND	255	410
Total	1480	2381

The highway passes through Texas, New Mexico, Colorado, Wyoming, South Dakota, and North Dakota. From Las Cruces, New Mexico to Fountain, Colorado, US 85 shares its alignment with I-25 and is not signed.

=== Texas ===
US 85 in Texas begins at the Mexican border with US 62 and travels north through El Paso, beginning at the Santa Fe Street Bridge, and following Santa Fe Street, then Paisano Drive westward, along the Rio Grande until Paisano Drive ends where it joins with Interstate 10 (I-10), about 14 miles (23 km) before both reach the New Mexico border. The route is concurrent with I-10 for the remainder of its route within Texas.

The original route of US 85 in Texas had the highway concurrent with Doniphan Drive (after Paisano Drive), and parallelling the Atchison, Topeka and Santa Fe Railway through the Mesilla Valley communities of Canutillo, Vinton and Anthony before crossing the Texas/New Mexico state line in Anthony, New Mexico, then following the road which is now New Mexico State Road 478 (NM 478) up the Mesilla Valley to Las Cruces. This route is marked as Texas State Highway 20 north of the intersection with Mesa Street/Country Club Drive.

=== New Mexico ===
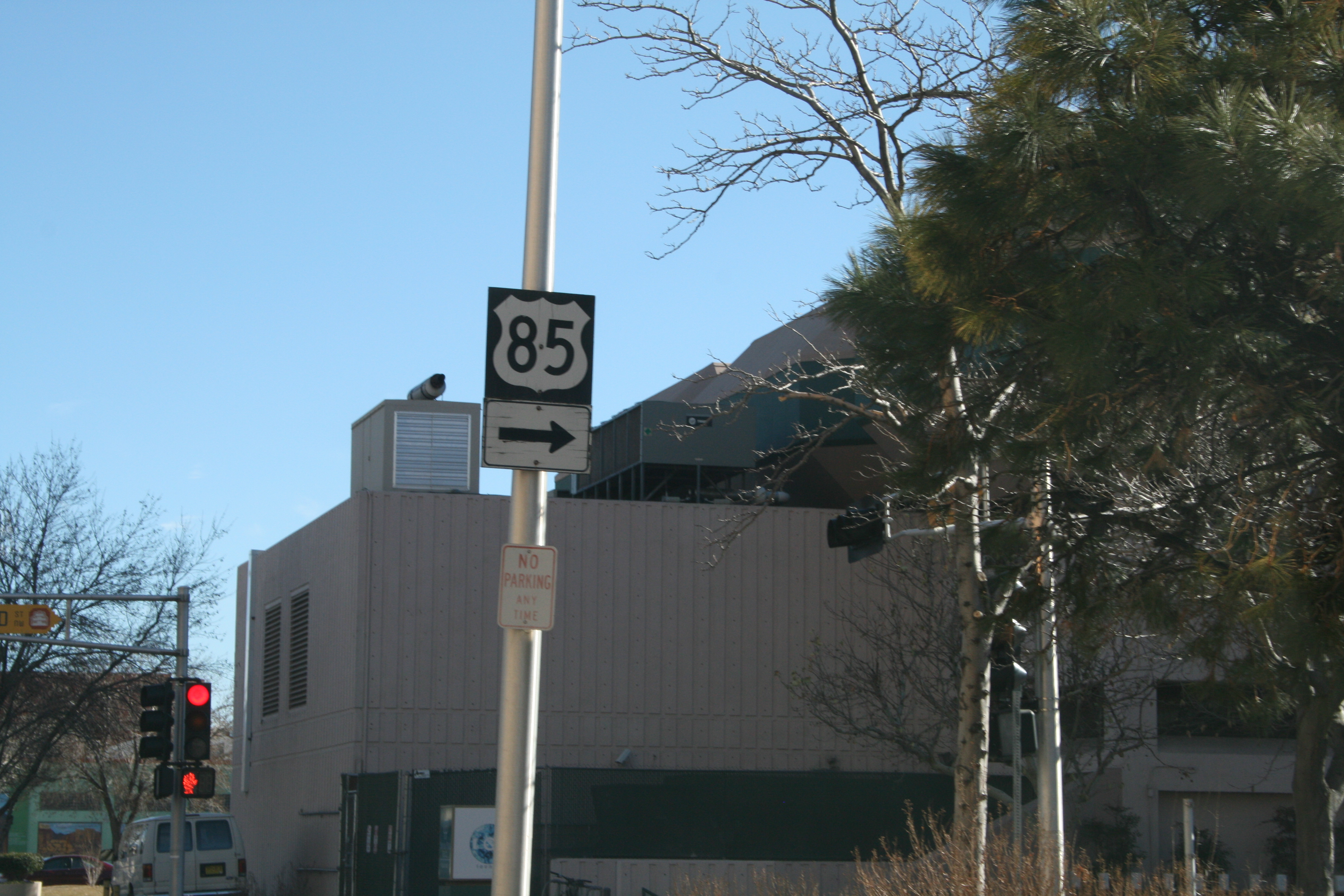
Remnant US 85 sign at Third Street and Roma Street in downtown Albuquerque in January 2009, New Mexico. US 85 was rerouted off this alignment c. 1990. As of May 2015, this sign has been removed from this location.

The unsigned route of US 85 through New Mexico exists only on paper to maintain continuity with signed sections in Colorado and Texas. Except for a four-mile (6.4 km) segment through Las Vegas (signed as Business Loop 25), US 85 in New Mexico is entirely concurrent with Interstate Highways. For the first 20 miles (32 km) it shares its route with I-10, then continues north for the remainder of its length in New Mexico concurrent with I-25. US 85 was de-signed in segments between 1970 and 1990 as I-25 was built through the state. I-25 between Bernalillo and a point just south of Santa Fe was built over the old US 85 alignment. I-25 was also built directly over US 85 from east of Santa Fe to Las Vegas and from US 64 to the Colorado border at Raton Pass. From the US 64/US 87 interchange in Raton to the Colorado state line at Raton Pass, US 85 also runs concurrently with US 87 (also unsigned along I-25 in New Mexico). At one point, the route went along the historic El Camino Real.

The original route from Anthony to Las Cruces is now signed as NM 478. The original route from Las Cruces to Hatch is now signed as NM 185; NM 187 south of Truth or Consequences (T or C); NM 181 north of T or C; NM 1 (the route's pre-US-85 designation) from Redrock to Socorro; NM 314 from Belen to Albuquerque; NM 313 from Albuquerque to Bernalillo; NM 14 and NM 466 through Santa Fe; and NM 445 from Maxwell to US 64 Remnant US 85 signs can still be seen on Fourth Street in downtown Albuquerque, the original route through the city before I-25 was built.

For concurrencies of Interstate, US Routes, and routes of different levels of significance, the New Mexico Department of Transportation's policy is to sign only the route of greater significance, while leaving the route of lesser significance unsigned. Consistent with this policy, NMDOT has removed US 85 from its route logs, but the American Association of State Highway and Transportation Officials (AASHTO) retains US 85 on a concurrent alignment with I-10 and I-25 to maintain continuity with signed segments in Texas and Colorado. Many mapmakers, such as the American Automobile Association, Rand McNally and Google Maps follow AASHTO's practice and still sign US 85 along its concurrent stretches with the respective Interstates.

=== Colorado ===
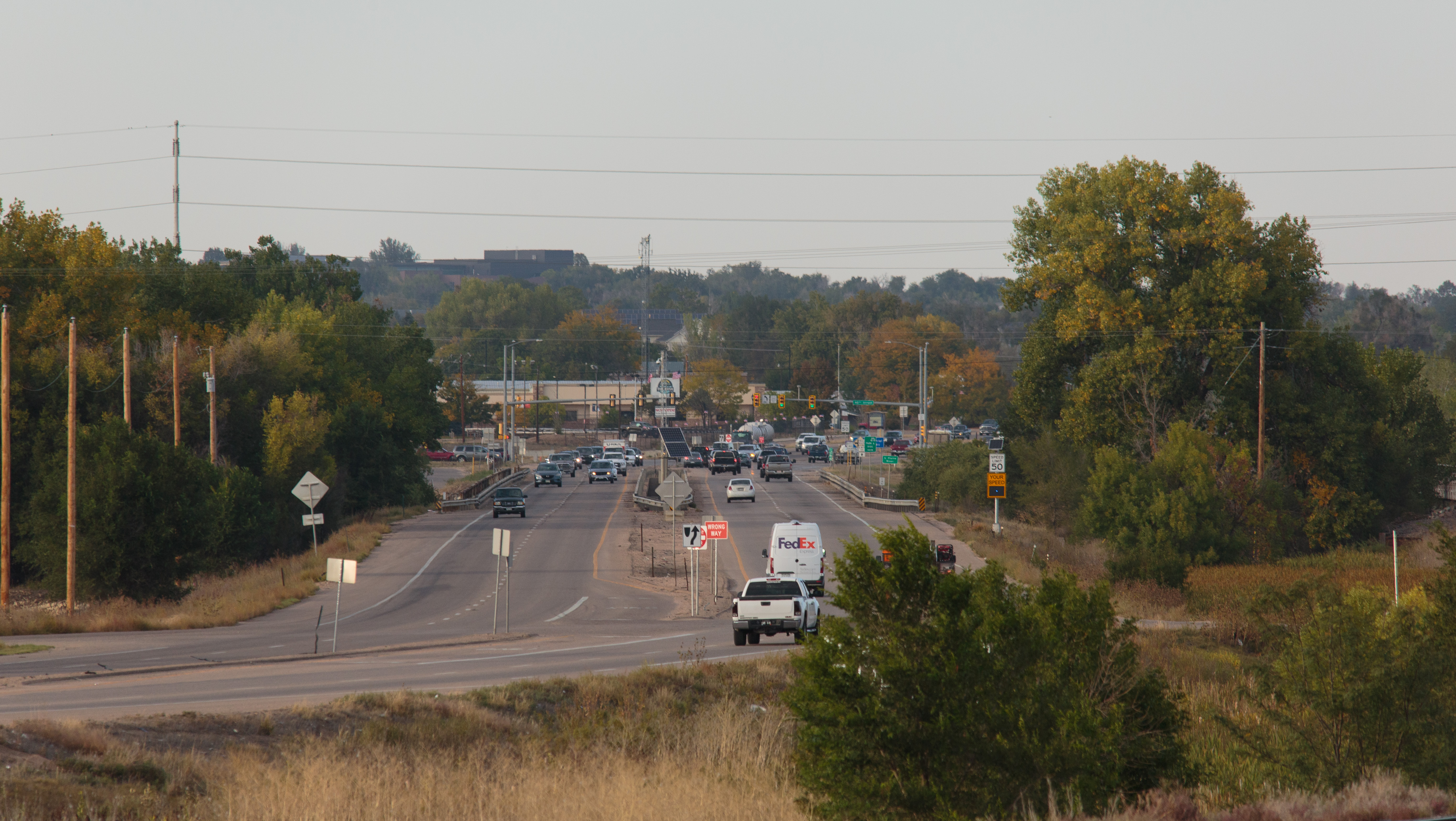
US 85 south of Evans, Colorado

US 85 enters Colorado from New Mexico concurrent with I-25 and US 87 but is not signed. US 85 leaves I-25 at exit 184. From there it heads west and north as a two-lane rural highway. It becomes an expressway near Chatfield Reservoir and the southern Denver suburbs of Littleton and Englewood, where it is commonly known as Santa Fe Drive. It continues north through Denver for a few miles before once again joining with I-25 at mile marker 207. There it runs concurrently with US 87 as well as I-25 and heads north through downtown Denver. At exit 214, US 85 turns east and runs concurrently with I-70 and US 6 for about a mile where it exits with US 6 and heads northeast through Commerce City. In just a few miles the US 6/US 85 concurrency merges with I-76 at mile marker 9. They travel concurrently for three miles (4.8 km) until exit 12 when US 85 becomes an expressway and continues north out of the Denver area through Brighton. From there it parallels I-25 for about 75 miles (121 km) passing through Fort Lupton, Platteville, LaSalle, Evans, Greeley, Eaton, Ault, Pierce, and Nunn before crossing into Wyoming.

=== Wyoming ===
US 85 enters Wyoming from Colorado eight miles (13 km) south of Cheyenne. In Cheyenne it joins with Business Route 87, and a mile later with I-180 until it meets with US 30. The segment with I-180 is the only fully at-grade Interstate Highway in the U.S. At exit 12, it joins with I-25 and US 87 in a concurrency for five miles (8.0 km) until US 85 leaves at exit 17 and travels northeast towards Meriden. From there it heads north to Torrington, where it meets with US 26 and runs concurrently for 10 miles (16 km) until Lingle, and 47 miles (76 km) later it meets US 20 and US 18 at Lusk. It shares the next 47 miles (76 km) with US 18 and 33 miles (53 km) later meets US 16 near Newcastle. From here it is 29 miles (47 km) until it enters South Dakota in the Black Hills.

=== South Dakota ===
The South Dakota section of US 85, with the exception of two concurrencies with US 14 Alternate and a concurrency with I-90, is defined at South Dakota Codified Laws § 31-4-181.

US 85 enters the Black Hills from Wyoming and travels northeast until it meets with US 14 Alternate east at Cheyenne Crossing. The two routes run a concurrently from there, along the way coming to the road which leads to Terry Peak. Upon entering to Lead, the two routes are separated, and the overlap with US 85 is replaced by a truck route. As the route US 85 and US 14 are separated until both meet again in Deadwood, but not before US 85 serves as the northern terminus of US 385. The routes run together through Deadwood before splitting, and US 85 then runs north to meet I-90. US 85 overlaps I-90 for eight miles (13 km) while heading west. At exit 10 on the north side of Spearfish, US 85 heads back north. At Belle Fourche it crosses State Highway 34 and US 212. From there it continues to North Dakota passing only through the small towns of Redig, Buffalo (where it meets State Highway 20), and Ludlow, as well as coming to the Geographic center of the United States.

=== North Dakota ===
US 85 enters North Dakota in the southwest part of the state. The first city on its route is Bowman at the junction of US 12. Continuing north, it passes between North Dakota's two highest points, White Butte and Black Butte. Near Amidon US 85 heads east for nine miles (14 km) before going back north along the Little Missouri National Grassland for about 125 miles (201 km). Near Belfield it junctions with I-94. After forming a concurrency with North Dakota Highway 200 (ND 200), it eventually passes through part of the scenic Badlands, crosses the Little Missouri River and passes near the Theodore Roosevelt National Park (North Unit).

Then, at Watford City it travels west for 16 miles (26 km) where it turns back north before Alexander. US 85 continues north as ND 200 turns west toward Montana. South of Williston it crosses the Missouri River. A few miles later it meets with US 2 where the two overlap for 19 miles (31 km) as an expressway, which bypasses Williston to the northwest. After US 2 heads east, US 85 continues north to a concurrency with ND 5. From there it is seven miles (11 km) to Fortuna where US 85 heads back north for its remaining six miles (9.7 km) to the Canadian border.

== History ==
What is now US 85 from El Paso, Texas to then-US 66 (now NM 6) in Los Lunas, New Mexico (south of Albuquerque) was shown as U.S. Route 466 in an early 1925 plan for the U.S. Highway System. This north–south route was never signed in the field; instead, the route was designated as U.S. Route 570 and then as part of US 85. The number "466" was later used along another routing.

== Major intersections ==
Texas
Benito Juárez Street and US 62 at the Mexico–US border in El Paso. US 62/US 85 travels concurrently through the city.
I-10 / US 180 in El Paso. The highways travel concurrently to the Las Cruces–University Park, New Mexico line.
New Mexico
I-10 / I-25 / US 180 on the Las Cruces–University Park line. I-25/US 85 shares a hidden concurrency to Fountain, Colorado.
US 70 in Las Cruces
US 380 west of San Antonio
US 60 in Socorro. The highways travel concurrently to south-southwest of Abeytas.
I-40 in Albuquerque
US 550 in Bernalillo
US 84 / US 285 south of Santa Fe. US 84/US 85 travels concurrently to Romeroville. US 85/US 285 travels concurrently to Eldorado at Santa Fe.
US 64 south of Raton. The highways travel concurrently to Raton.
US 64 / US 87 in Raton. US 85/US 87 travels concurrently to Fountain, Colorado.
Colorado
US 160 in Trinidad. The highways travel concurrently to Walsenburg.
US 50 in Pueblo. The highways travel concurrently through Pueblo.
I-25 / US 24 / US 87 in Colorado Springs
I-25 / US 87 in Colorado Springs. The highways travel concurrently to Castle Rock.
I-25 / US 87 in Denver. The highways travel concurrently through Denver.
US 6 in Denver. The highways travel concurrently to near Commerce City.
US 40 / US 287 in Denver
I-25 / I-70 / US 87 in Denver. I-70/US 85 travels concurrently through Denver.
I-270 / US 36 in Commerce City
I-76 / US 6 in Henderson
US 34 in Evans. The highways travel concurrently to Greeley.
Wyoming
I-80 / I-180 on the Fox Farm-College–Cheyenne line. I-180/US 85 travels concurrently into Cheyenne proper.
I-180 / US 30 in Cheyenne
I-25 / US 87 in Cheyenne. The highways travel concurrently to Ranchettes.
US 26 in Torrington. The highways travel concurrently to Lingle.
US 18 / US 20 in Lusk. US 18/US 85 travels concurrently to the northeastern part of Niobrara County. US 20/US 85 travels concurrently through Lusk.
US 16 in Newcastle
South Dakota
US 385 in Deadwood
I-90 / US 14 in Spearfish. The highways travel concurrently to North Spearfish.
US 212 in Belle Fourche
North Dakota
US 12 in Bowman. The highways travel concurrently through Bowman.
I-94 in Belfield
US 2 west of Williston.
US 2 / US 85B on Williston city line. Southern end of US 2 concurrency. Northern terminus of US 85B.
US 2 north of Williston. Northern end of US 2 concurrency.
Highway 35 at the Canada–US border north-northwest of Fortuna

== See also ==
- Special routes of U.S. Route 85

Browse numbered routes
← US 84	NM	→ US 87
← US 84	CO	→ SH 86
← I-80	WY	→ US 87
← US 83	SD	→ SD 87
