= Mesilla Valley =

Valley in New Mexico and Texas, United States

Coordinates: 31°47′25″N 106°25′24″W

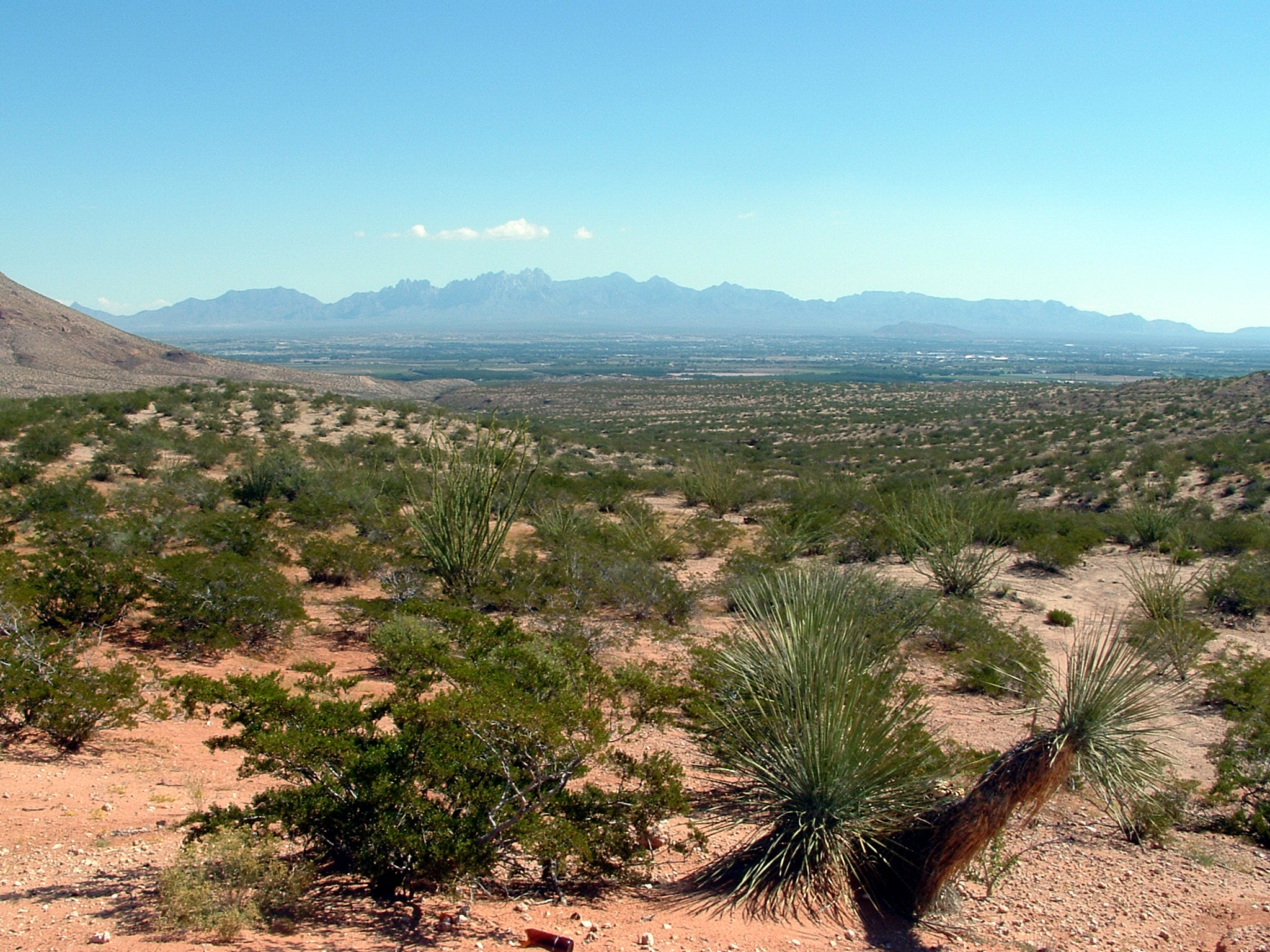
The Mesilla Valley as seen from Las Cruces' west mesa.

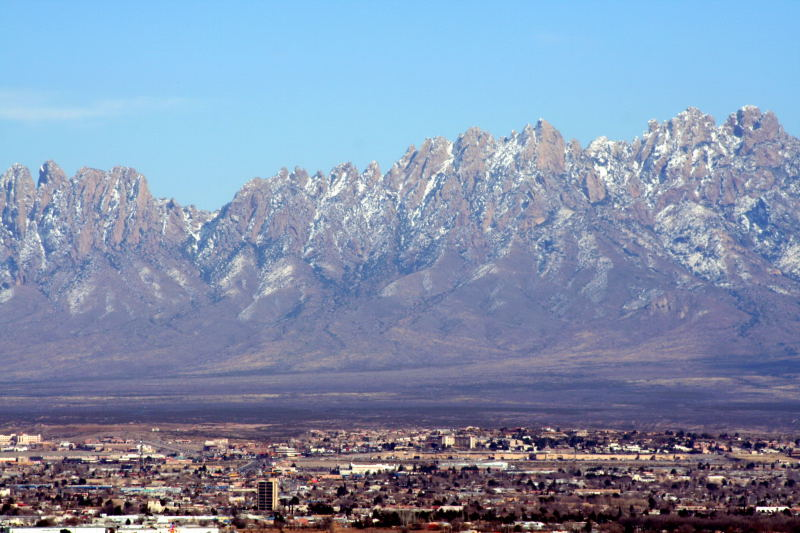
The Organ Mountains tower over the Mesilla Valley (Las Cruces, NM in the foreground).

The Mesilla Valley is a geographic feature of Southern New Mexico and far West Texas. It was formed by repeated heavy spring floods of the Rio Grande.

== Background ==
The fertile Mesilla Valley extends from Radium Springs, New Mexico, to the west side of El Paso, Texas. The valley is characterized by its few remaining bosques, as well as its native cottonwood trees, and increasingly, by invasive tamarisk, which was introduced in the late 19th century, and is known locally as salt cedar.

Due to the fertile nature of the valley, agriculture is a very important activity in this area. Stahmann Farms owns the world's largest pecan orchard, located south of the city of Las Cruces, New Mexico. Alfalfa, cotton, chile, onions and corn are other important cash crops grown in the Mesilla Valley. The Mesilla Valley is also known for its wine-producing capabilities, which originated with the Spanish exploration into New Mexico. It was part of Mexico until the Gadsden Purchase in 1853.
