= Anthony, New Mexico =

- City
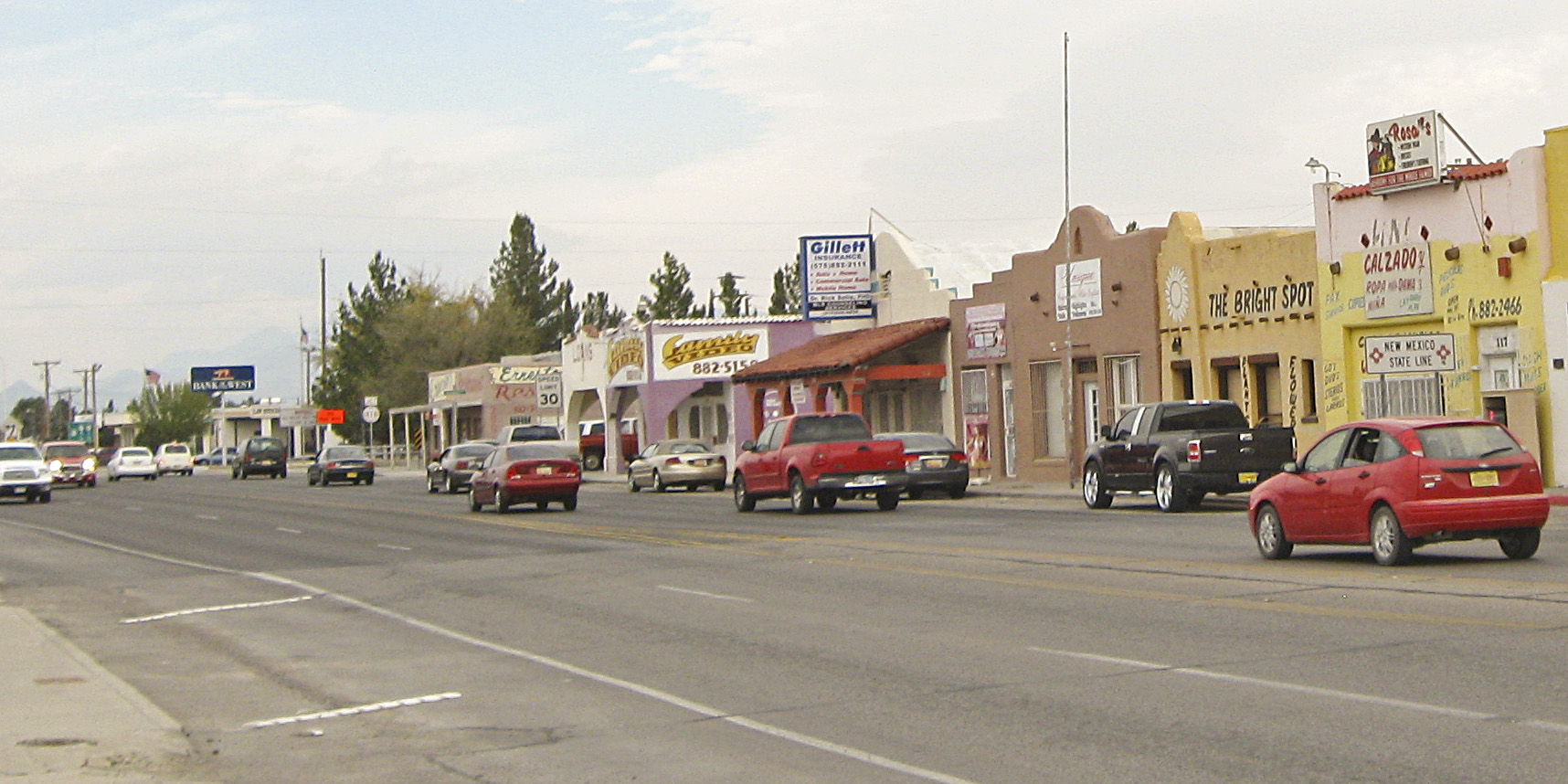
- Main Street in Anthony (2009)

- Location within Doña Ana County and State of New Mexico

- Location in the United States
- Coordinates: 32°00′47″N 106°36′17″W
- Country: United States
- State: New Mexico
- County: Doña Ana
- Founded: 2010
- Incorporated: 2010

Area
  - Total: 2.70 sq mi (6.99 km^{2})
  - Land: 2.70 sq mi (6.99 km^{2})
  - Water: 0 sq mi (0.00 km^{2})
- Elevation: 3,806 ft (1,160 m)

Population (2020)
  - Total: 8,693
  - Density: 3,221.3/sq mi (1,243.74/km^{2})
- Time zone: UTC-7 (Mountain (MST))
  - Summer (DST): UTC-6 (MDT)
- ZIP code: 88021
- Area code: 575
- FIPS code: 35-03820
- GNIS ID: 2407748
- Website: cityofanthonynm.gov

Anthony is a city in Doña Ana County, New Mexico, United States. The population was 8,693 at the 2020 census. It is located on the New Mexico–Texas state line in the Upper Mesilla Valley (immediately north of Anthony, Texas), and on Interstate 10, 24 miles (39 km) south of Las Cruces and 18 miles (29 km) north of El Paso, Texas.

== History ==
In an election held on January 5, 2010, Anthony residents voted in favor of incorporating the community. A total of 561 votes were cast, with 410 (73.1%) supporting the measure and 151 (26.9%) opposed. The new municipality officially came into existence on July 1, 2010.

On January 18, 2024 the city of Anthony board of trustees passed a resolution of "no confidence" against its mayor and Doña Ana County commissioner Diana Murillo. The board concluded that she was mismanaging city funds and that her administration was "a detriment to the well-being of the city, its residents and city employees.". In March 2024, Murillo was ordered to repay $24,000 of taxpayers funds she used for a personal legal battle. In October, Murillo faced further backlash for allegedly leaving the city without legal council for months.

== Geography ==
According to the United States Census Bureau, the CDP has a total area of 3.9 square miles (10 km^{2}), all land.

== Demographics ==
Historical population
Census	Pop.	Note	%±
2010	9,360		—
2020	8,693		−7.1%
U.S. Decennial Census

The city is part of the El Paso–Las Cruces combined statistical area.

=== 2020 census ===
As of the 2020 census, Anthony had a population of 8,693. The median age was 31.1 years. 29.8% of residents were under the age of 18 and 12.1% were 65 years of age or older. For every 100 females there were 88.9 males, and for every 100 females age 18 and over there were 81.2 males age 18 and over.

99.0% of residents lived in urban areas, while 1.0% lived in rural areas.

There were 2,703 households in Anthony, of which 45.9% had children under the age of 18 living in them. Of all households, 43.6% were married-couple households, 14.0% were households with a male householder and no spouse or partner present, and 36.2% were households with a female householder and no spouse or partner present. About 17.8% of all households were made up of individuals and 7.6% had someone living alone who was 65 years of age or older.

There were 2,869 housing units, of which 5.8% were vacant. The homeowner vacancy rate was 0.5% and the rental vacancy rate was 3.5%.

Racial composition as of the 2020 census
Race	Number	Percent
White	2,915	33.5%
Black or African American	44	0.5%
American Indian and Alaska Native	93	1.1%
Asian	16	0.2%
Native Hawaiian and Other Pacific Islander	3	0.0%
Some other race	2,678	30.8%
Two or more races	2,944	33.9%
Hispanic or Latino (of any race)	8,466	97.4%

=== 2010 census ===
As of the census of 2010, there were 9,360 people, 2,467 households, and 1,858 families residing in the city. The population density was 2,362.4 people per square mile. The racial makeup of the city was 61.5% White, 0.8% African American, 0.5% Native American, 0.1% Asian, 0.1% Pacific Islander, and 2.5% from other races. Hispanic or Latino people of any race were 97.4% of the population.

There were 2,467 households, out of which 9.9% had children under the age of 5 living with them, 35.9% were under the age of 18, and 8.7% were over the age of 65.

=== Income and poverty ===
The median income for a household is $22,216. The per capita income for the city was $9,239. About 40.2% of the population is below the poverty line.

== Education ==
Anthony is located within the Gadsden Independent School District.

Gadsden Elementary, Loma Linda Elementary and Anthony Elementary are all located within the city boundaries. Gadsden High School, Gadsden Middle School, Alta Vista Early College High School and Anthony Charter School, a satellite campus of Doña Ana Community College, and a branch of New Mexico State University all sit just outside the municipality.

== Government ==
Following the successful incorporation vote, elections for city offices – mayor, municipal judge, and municipal trustees – were held on April 13, 2010. Ramon S. Gonzalez defeated four other candidates in the mayoral race, receiving 55.6 percent of the vote. Peggy Sue Scott was elected to the position of municipal judge. Thirteen candidates competed for the four available municipal trustee positions. They were won by Betty Gonzalez, Juan M. Acevedo, Diana Murillo, and James G. Scott. The first council meeting took place on July 7, 2010.

The final, canvassed results for the March 6 election in Anthony, are as follows:

- Mayor: Arnulfo Castañeda, 224 (winner); Juan Acevedo, 181
- Two trustees: James Scott, 231 (winner); Pilar Madrid, 255 (winner); Janny Brumlow, 160
- Municipal judge: Peggy Scott, 340 (winner)

The total number of ballots cast in the election was 1,391, according to a canvass certificate. Of those, 1,244 were cast on election day, 136 were cast in early voting and 11 were cast in absentee voting.
