= National Register of Historic Places listings in Sierra County, New Mexico =

Location of Sierra County in New Mexico

This is a list of the National Register of Historic Places listings in Sierra County, New Mexico.

This is intended to be a complete list of the properties and districts on the National Register of Historic Places in Sierra County, New Mexico, United States. Latitude and longitude coordinates are provided for many National Register properties and districts; these locations may be seen together in a map.

There are 32 properties and districts listed on the National Register in the county. All places within the county on the National Register are also listed on the State Register of Cultural Properties.

This National Park Service list is complete through NPS recent listings posted March 14, 2025.

Contents: NRHP in New Mexico by county
Bernalillo – Catron – Chaves – Cibola – Colfax – Curry – De Baca – Doña Ana – Eddy – Grant – Guadalupe – Harding – Hidalgo – Lea – Lincoln – Los Alamos – Luna – McKinley – Mora – Otero – Quay – Rio Arriba – Roosevelt – San Juan – San Miguel – Sandoval – Santa Fe – Sierra – Socorro – Taos – Torrance – Union – Valencia

== Current listings ==
| | Name on the Register | Image | Date listed | Location | City or town | Description |
|---|---|---|---|---|---|---|
| 1 | Alert-Hatcher Building | | April 20, 1995 (#95000460) | Southeastern corner of the junction of 2nd Ave. and Main St. 32°55′12″N 107°34′09″W | Hillsboro | L-shaped, one-story building along Main and Second St., on southeast corner |
| 2 | Archeological Site No. LA1119 | | December 16, 1989 (#88000489) | Address Restricted | Truth or Consequences | |
| 3 | Archeological Site No. LA49016 | | December 16, 1989 (#88000484) | Address Restricted | Truth or Consequences | |
| 4 | Archeological Site No. LA49030 | | December 16, 1989 (#88000486) | Address Restricted | Truth or Consequences | |
| 5 | Archeological Site No. LA50548 | | December 16, 1989 (#88000488) | Address Restricted | Truth or Consequences | |
| 6 | Archeological Site No. LA517 | | December 16, 1989 (#88000473) | Address Restricted | Truth or Consequences | |
| 7 | William H. Bucher House | | April 20, 1995 (#95000461) | 300 W. Main St. 32°55′11″N 107°34′11″W | Hillsboro | |
| 8 | Camino Real-Jornada Lakes Section | | April 8, 2011 (#11000167) | Address Restricted | Engle | part of the Camino Real in New Mexico, AD 1598-1881 Multiple Property Submission |
| 9 | Camino Real-Point of Rocks Section | | April 8, 2011 (#11000171) | Address Restricted | Rincon | part of the Camino Real in New Mexico, AD 1598-1881 Multiple Property Submission |
| 10 | Camino Real-Yost Draw Section | | April 8, 2011 (#11000163) | Address Restricted | Engle | part of the Camino Real in New Mexico, AD 1598-1881 Multiple Property Submission |
| 11 | Chambers Canyon Site (LA49028) | | December 16, 1989 (#88000485) | Address Restricted | Truth or Consequences | |
| 12 | Elephant Butte Dam | Elephant Butte Dam | April 9, 1979 (#79001556) | Northwest of Elephant Butte off State Road 51; 33°09′17″N 107°11′31″W | Elephant Butte | |
| 13 | Elephant Butte Historic District | | February 10, 1997 (#96001616) | Roughly along State Road 51 from the Elephant Butte Dam to Mescal Canyon and along State Road 52 from Ash Canyon to Long Ridge; 33°08′56″N 107°11′27″W | Elephant Butte | |
| 14 | Elephant Butte Irrigation District | | August 8, 1997 (#97000822) | Roughly along U.S. Route 85 between its junction with State Road 90 and the El Paso city limits 32°12′58″N 106°57′31″W | Las Cruces | Extends into Doña Ana County and El Paso County, Texas |
| 15 | Fort McRae | Fort McRae | April 7, 2005 (#05000258) | Address Restricted | Elephant Butte | |
| 16 | Hillsboro High School | Hillsboro High School | April 15, 1993 (#93000254) | Southeastern corner of the junction of Elenora St. and 1st Ave. 32°55′10″N 107°34′01″W | Hillsboro | |
| 17 | Hillsboro Peak Lookout Tower and Cabin | Hillsboro Peak Lookout Tower and Cabin | January 28, 1988 (#87002475) | Gila National Forest; 32°57′09″N 107°46′43″W | Hillsboro | |
| 18 | Horse Island Site (LA48996) | | May 16, 1988 (#88000478) | Address Restricted | Truth or Consequences | |
| 19 | Hot Springs Bathhouse and Commercial Historic District in Truth or Consequences | Hot Springs Bathhouse and Commercial Historic District in Truth or Consequences | May 10, 2005 (#05000409) | Roughly bounded by Post, Van Patten, Pershing, and Main Sts. 33°07′40″N 107°15′17″W | Truth or Consequences | |
| 20 | Kettle Top Butte Site (LA48995) | | May 16, 1988 (#88000477) | Address Restricted | Truth or Consequences | |
| 21 | Longbottom Canyon Site (LA49033) | | December 16, 1989 (#88000487) | Address Restricted | Truth or Consequences | |
| 22 | Meyers House | | April 20, 1995 (#95000463) | Northern side of Main St. between 4th and 5th Aves. 32°55′12″N 107°34′15″W | Hillsboro | |
| 23 | George Tambling and Ninette Stocker Miller House | George Tambling and Ninette Stocker Miller House | April 20, 1995 (#95000465) | South side of Elenora St., west of Union Church; 32°55′09″N 107°34′05″W | Hillsboro | Late-Victorian architecture, built of recycled gold ore. |
| 24 | Monticello Point Archeological District | | May 16, 1988 (#88000476) | Address Restricted | Truth or Consequences | |
| 25 | Palomas Narrows North (LA38755) | | December 16, 1989 (#88000475) | Address Restricted | Truth or Consequences | |
| 26 | Palomas Narrows South (LA49007) | | December 16, 1989 (#88000479) | Address Restricted | Truth or Consequences | |
| 27 | Percha Creek Bridge | Percha Creek Bridge | July 15, 1997 (#97000731) | State Road 90 over Percha Creek; 32°55′00″N 107°36′21″W | Hillsboro | Steel deck truss bridge built in 1927 |
| 28 | Percha Diversion Dam | Percha Diversion Dam | April 6, 1979 (#79001555) | 2 miles (3.2 km) northeast of Arrey; 32°52′06″N 107°18′11″W | Arrey | |
| 29 | Will M. Robins House | Will M. Robins House | April 20, 1995 (#95000462) | Southwestern corner of the junction of Main St. and 5th Ave. 32°55′10″N 107°34′18″W | Hillsboro | |
| 30 | Cornelius Sullivan House | | April 20, 1995 (#95000459) | Southwestern corner of the junction of Elenora and 1st Ave. 32°55′10″N 107°34′04″W | Hillsboro | |
| 31 | Carrie Tingley Hospital Historic District | Carrie Tingley Hospital Historic District | March 15, 2005 (#03001546) | 992 Broadway; 33°07′19″N 107°15′38″W | Truth or Consequences | |
| 32 | US Post Office-Truth or Consequences Main | US Post Office-Truth or Consequences Main | February 23, 1990 (#90000141) | 300 Main St. 33°07′47″N 107°15′10″W | Truth or Consequences | |
| 33 | John M. Webster House | John M. Webster House | April 20, 1995 (#95000464) | Southeastern corner of the junction of Main St. and 5th Ave. 32°55′10″N 107°34′16″W | Hillsboro | |

== See also ==
- List of National Historic Landmarks in New Mexico
- National Register of Historic Places listings in New Mexico
