= New Mexico State Road 26 =

State highway in New Mexico, United States

State Road 26
- NM 26 highlighted in red

Route information
- Maintained by NMDOT
- Length: 47.862 mi (77.026 km)
- Existed: 1905–present

Major junctions
- West end: US 180 north of Deming
- NM 27 in Nutt; NM 187 in Hatch; NM 185 in Hatch
- East end: I-25 / US 85 north of Hatch

Location
- Country: United States
- State: New Mexico
- Counties: Luna, Sierra, Doña Ana

Highway system
- New Mexico State Highway System; Interstate; US; State; Scenic
← NM 25	→ NM 27

New Mexico State Road 26 (NM 26) is a 47.862-mile-long (77.026 km) paved, two-lane state highway in Luna, Sierra, and Doña Ana counties in the U.S. state of New Mexico. It travels southwest-to-northeast largely following the Southwestern Railroad.

The western terminus of NM 26 is at intersection with US 180 north of Deming. The eastern terminus is north of Hatch at the interchange with I-25. NM 26 is an important connecting road between I-10 and I-25 west of Las Cruces. In the vicinity of Deming NM 26 is also known as Hatch Highway.

== Route description ==
The highway begins just north of Deming at the intersection with US 180. For the first 3.25 miles the road travels mostly east-northeast until it closes in with the Southwestern Railroad. From that point on the highway turns northeast and follows the railroad track. The road travels through the Chihuahuan Desert with southern slopes of Cooke's Range mountains skirting from the north. At approximately 14 mile mark Cooke's Peak, named after Captain Philip St. George Cooke, and the tallest mountain in the Cooke's Range, can be seen to the north of the highway. At 14.45 miles NM 26 intersects with CR A019 (Cooke's Canyon Rd) providing access to Cooke's Canyon, Cooke's Spring and Fort Cummings historic site. At 22.53 miles wind turbines can be seen to the north of NM 26 which are part of the Macho Springs Wind Farm built in 2011 and generating 50 MW of windpower. After 27.722 miles (44.614 km) NM 26 intersects with NM 27 in a ghost town of Nutt, changes direction to slightly more easterly, and passes through the Good Sight Mountains. At 36.261 miles (58.356 km) the road leaves the Luna County and briefly enters Sierra County and exits it into Doña Ana County at 37.146 miles (59.781 km). The highway continues following the railroad tracks and passes by Hatch Municipal Airport at 44.575 miles (71.737 km). After about a mile, NM 26 reaches community of Placitas where it intersects with NM 187 turning eastward. Travelling through Hatch NM 26 meets with NM 185 0.327 miles (0.526 km) further and turns north at the intersection. At 47.454 miles (76.370 km) NM 26 crosses the Rio Grande river over a 691.3 feet (210.7 m) bridge, built in 1965, and arrives at its northeastern terminus 0.380 miles (0.612 km) later.

== History ==
NM 26 contains sections of the original Routes 26 and 27 created in 1905 by the Territorial Legislative Assembly. It contains a segment of the old Route 26 from Deming to Nutt and a stretch from Nutt to Hatch which was the original Route 27. During early 1940s Route 26 was re-routed towards Hatch, and the road to Hillsboro became Route 27. On 1927 map Route 26 is shown as a "first class" road between Deming and Hillsboro while a stretch between Nutt and Hatch is shown as "third class" road. On 1938 map both Routes 26 and 27 shown as "graded" and 1941 map shows both stretches of Route 26 and 27 as having "oil and concrete" surface. By 1950s the entire road was paved.

== Major intersections ==
County	Location	mi	km	Destinations	Notes
Luna		0.000	0.000	US 180 to I-10 / US 70 – Deming, Silver City	Western terminus; to I-10 and US 70 via US 180 east
Luna	Nutt	27.722	44.614	NM 27 north – Hillsboro	Southern terminus of NM 27
Sierra	No major junctions				
Doña Ana	Hatch	46.124	74.229	NM 187 north – Caballo	Southern terminus of NM 187
Doña Ana	Hatch	46.521	74.868	NM 185 south – Las Cruces	Northern terminus of NM 185
Doña Ana		47.862	77.026	I-25 / US 85 – Las Cruces, Albuquerque	Eastern terminus; I-25 Exit 41
1.000 mi = 1.609 km; 1.000 km = 0.621 mi

== See also ==
- List of state roads in New Mexico
