= New Mexico State Road 187 =

State highway in New Mexico, United States

State Road 187

Route information
- Maintained by NMDOT
- Length: 36.253 mi (58.344 km)

Major junctions
- South end: NM 26 in Hatch
- I-25 / US 85 by Caballo Lake
- North end: I-25 BL in Williamsburg

Location
- Country: United States
- State: New Mexico
- Counties: Doña Ana, Sierra

Highway system
- New Mexico State Highway System; Interstate; US; State; Scenic
← NM 186	→ NM 188

State Road 187 (NM 187) is a state highway in the US state of New Mexico. Its total length is approximately 36.253 miles (58.344 km). NM 187's southern terminus is in Hatch, at NM 26 and NM 187's northern terminus is at I 25 Bus. Loop 11 in Williamsburg.

== Route description ==
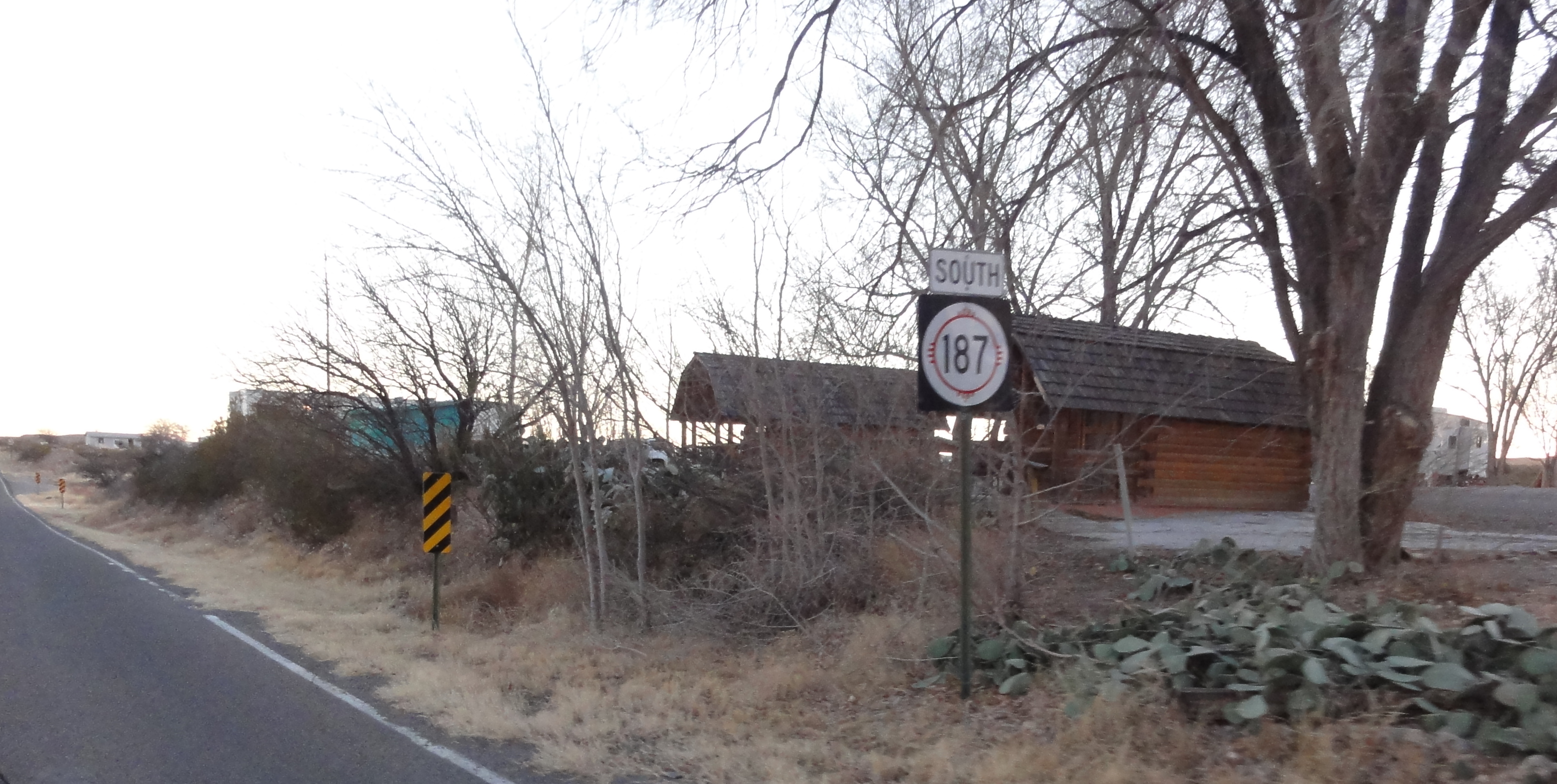
NM 187 southbound

NM 187 begins at NM 26 in Hatch and starts traveling northward. It then intersects Interstate 25 (I-25) and U.S. Route 85 (US-85) by Caballo Lake. It then intersects NM 152 in Hillsboro. It then ends at I-25 Bus. in Williamsburg.

== Major intersections ==
County	Location	mi	km	Destinations	Notes
Doña Ana	Hatch	0.000	0.000	NM 26	Southern terminus
Doña Ana	Salem	4.615	7.427	NM 390 north	Southern terminus of NM 390
Doña Ana	Garfield	8.141	13.102	NM 390 south	Northern terminus of NM 390
Doña Ana		8.810	14.178	NM 436 north	Southern terminus of NM 436
Sierra		11.01	17.72	NM 546 east	Western terminus of NM 546
Sierra	Derry	11.75	18.91	NM 436 south	Northern terminus of NM 436
Sierra	Caballo	20.037	32.246	I-25 / US 85	I-25 exit 59
Sierra	Hillsboro	24.225	38.986	NM 152 west to I-25 / US 85	Eastern terminus of NM 152
Sierra	Williamsburg	36.253	58.344	I-25 BL	Northern terminus
1.000 mi = 1.609 km; 1.000 km = 0.621 mi

== See also ==
- List of state roads in New Mexico
