= Nutt, New Mexico =

- Unincorporated community
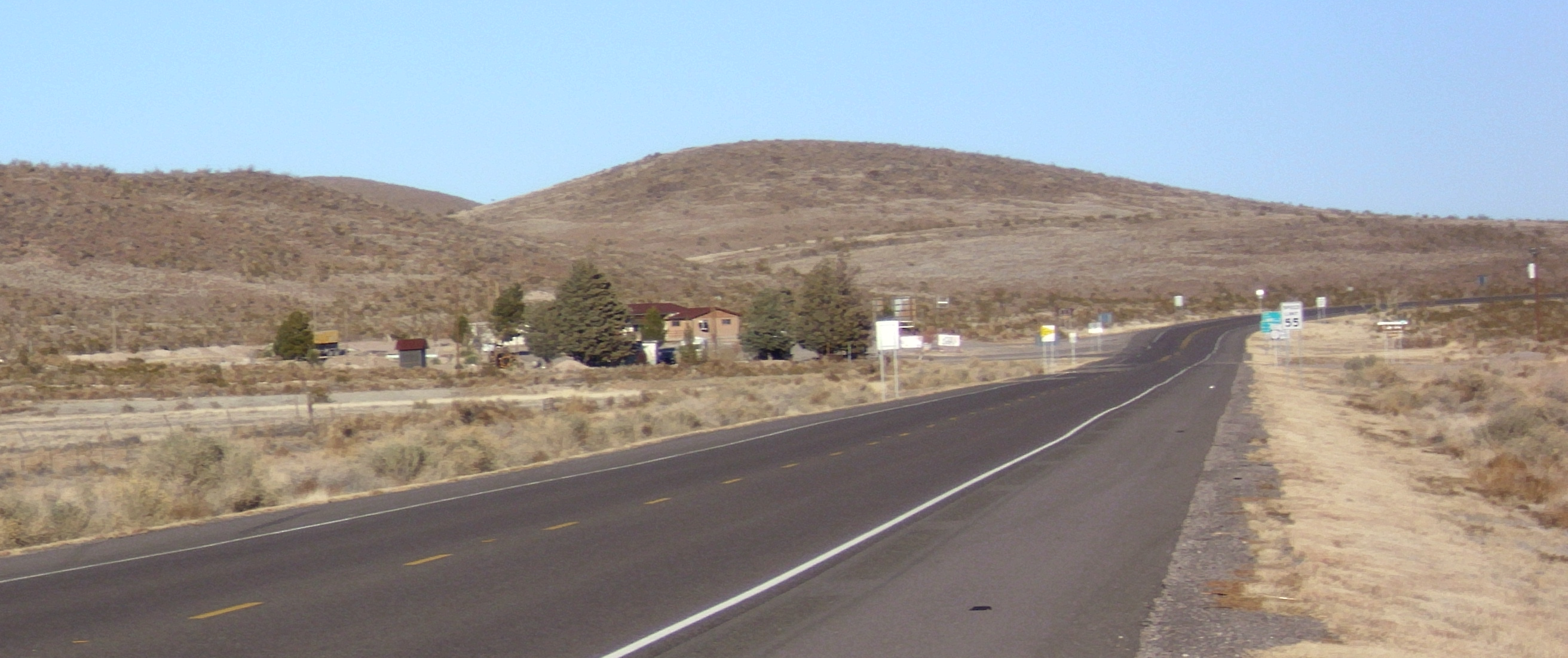
- Nutt in January 2013, looking northeast

- Location within New Mexico Location within the United States
- Coordinates: 32°34′22″N 107°26′58″W
- Country: United States
- State: New Mexico
- County: Luna
- Founded: 1881
- Elevation: 4,721 ft (1,439 m)

Population (2010)
  - Total: 12
- Time zone: UTC-7 (MST)
  - Summer (DST): UTC-6 (MDT)
- ZIP codes: 88030
- Area code: 575
- GNIS feature ID: 898578

Nutt is an unincorporated community in Luna County, southern New Mexico, in the American Southwest. It is located nineteen miles southwest of Hatch on NM 26 at the intersection with NM 27.

== History ==
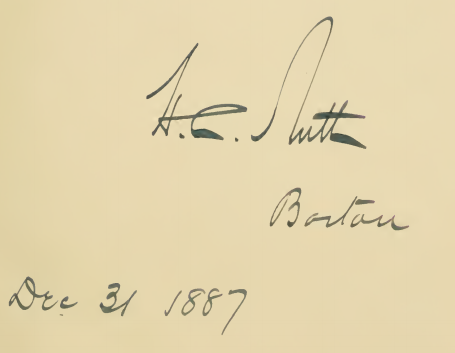
Signature of H.C. Nutt

Prior to the founding of the town, the area was the site of Lloyd's Ranch and Slocum's Ranch, and was subject to attacks by the Apache.

The town of Nutt was founded in 1881 as a depot and water station on the Atchison, Topeka and Santa Fe Railway and was named after Colonel Henry Clay Nutt who served on their board of directors, and was instrumental in getting enabling legislation through the New Mexico Territorial Legislature for the southern spur of the railway. Wagon trains left Nutt for the mining communities in the Black Range until the Santa Fe ran a spur line up to Lake Valley in 1884. After the spur was built, Nutt quickly declined. Its history as a town after 1884 is rather obscure. It has referred to itself as being the Middle of Nowhere. Its only claim to fame came in 1892 when Tom Ketchum aka "Black Jack" and his brother Sam learned that an Atchison, Topeka and Santa Fe train was en route to Deming with a large payroll. The gang stopped the train just outside Nutt, holding it up at gunpoint, and made off with about $20,000.

Nutt had a post office from 1881 until 1884, and again from 1899 until 1939.

== Geography ==
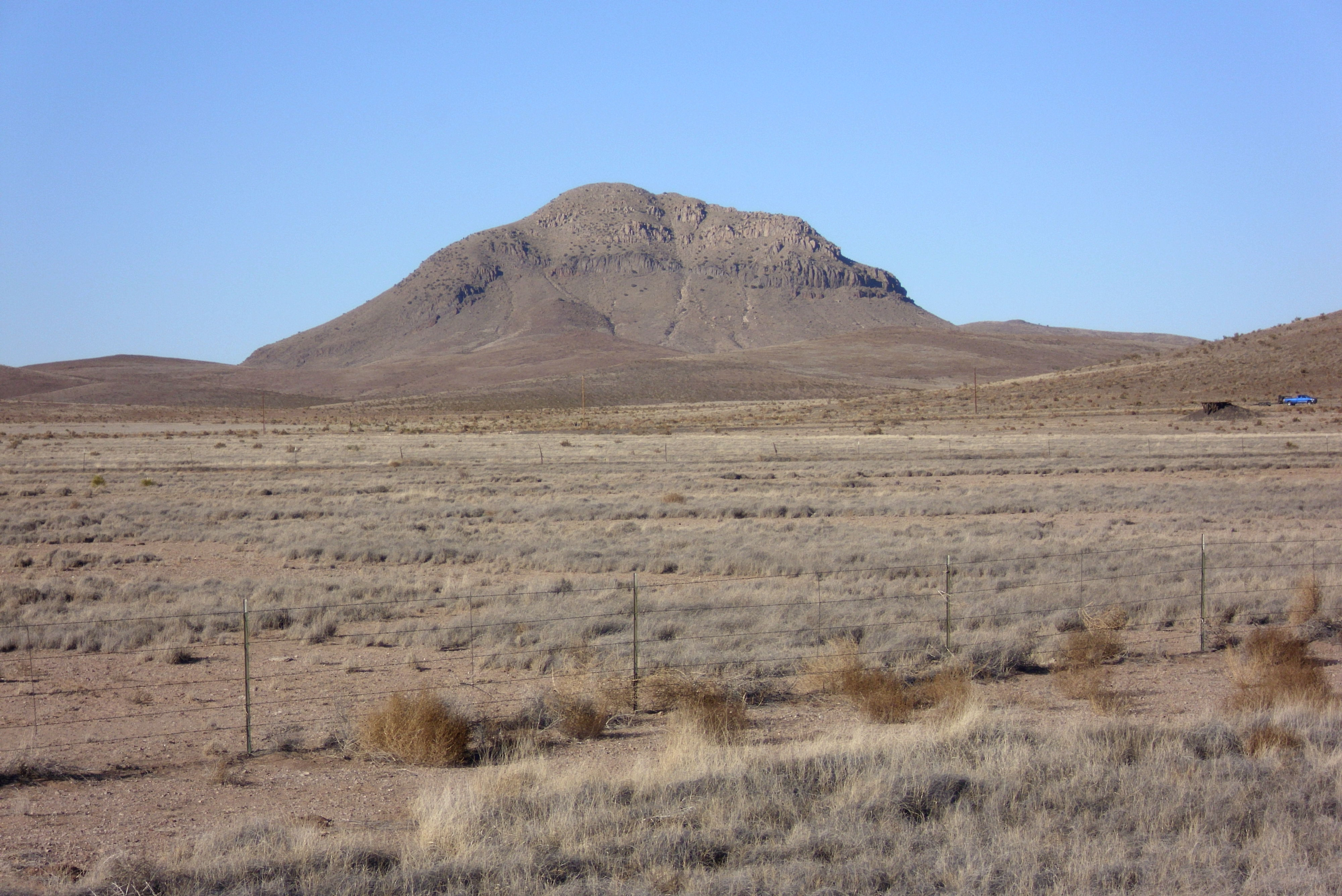
South face of Nutt Mountain

Nutt is located on a rise between Los Uvas Valley to the east, and the Macho Creek Valley to the west. The rise is actually a pass through the remnants of the Good Sight Mountains, the tallest of which, Nutt Mountain at 5,940 ft., is 2.5 miles north of Nutt. Nutt Mountain is a volcanic plug composed of layered rhyolites, and has also been called Sunday Cone. The soil in Nutt is composed of eroded tuffs, andesites, latites and rhyolites.

== Demographics ==
For the 2010 census, Nutt was part of the United States Census Bureau's Deming North CCD, Tract 5. In 2010, there were 12 people recorded for Nutt.
