= New Mexico State Road 320 =

State highway in Doña Ana County, New Mexico, United States

State Road 320
- Thorpe Road
- NM 320 highlighted in red

Route information
- Maintained by NMDOT
- Length: 2.000 mi (3.219 km)

Major junctions
- West end: NM 185 west of Doña Ana
- I-25 in Doña Ana
- East end: End of state maintenance in Doña Ana

Location
- Country: United States
- State: New Mexico
- Counties: Doña Ana

Highway system
- New Mexico State Highway System; Interstate; US; State; Scenic
← NM 319	→ NM 321

State Road 320 (NM 320), also known as Thorpe Road, is a 2.000-mile (3.219 km) two–lane state highway in the Mesilla Valley in Doña Ana County, New Mexico, United States, that connects New Mexico State Road 185 (NM 185) with the end of state maintenance in Doña Ana, just northeast of its interchange with Interstate 25/U.S. Route 85 (I-25/US 85).

== Route description ==
NM 320 (Thorpe Road) begins at a T intersection with NM 185, about 1.3 miles (2.1 km) southwest of Doña Ana and approximately 1,350 feet (410 m) east of the Rio Grande. (NM 185 heads north–northwesterly along the Rio Grande toward Radium Springs and Hatch. NM 185 heads southerly toward Las Cruces and Anthony.) From its western terminus, NM 320 heads northeast for about 0.3 miles (0.48 km) before connecting with the north end of Redfox Road (which immediately enters a small gated community), followed by the north end of Strange Road (County Road 37). Then the north end of Marigold Street. After crossing the Leasburg Canal, NM 320 connects with the north end of Shenandoah Trail (street) and then has a jog of about 300 feet (91 m) to the north before resuming its northeastern course. Immediately after the jog, NM 320 connects with the south end of Giron Road (a dirt road), promptly crosses three sets of tracks for the BNSF Railway, and crosses Dona Ana Road (County Road 28). Roughly 0.4 miles (0.64 km) later NM 320 connects with the south end of Barela Road (County Road 40) and immediately enters the limits of the census-designated place of Doña Ana (about 1.3 miles [2.1 km] from the beginning of the highway).

Just after entering Doña Ana, NM 320 connects with the north end of Dusty Lane and then crosses Abeyta Street as the highway turns to head east. NM 320 then crosses Ledesma Drive (passing just north of the post office for the community, which is signed as "Dona Ana") and then connects with the south end of Venegas Drive and the north end of Joe Gutierrez Street. Directly thereafter, NM 320 turns to head northeast again as it connects with the north end of El Camino Real Road and passes between two gas stations (the southern of which also serves as the local stop for Greyhound Lines intercity bus service.) Immediately thereafter, NM 320 reaches a diamond interchange with I-25/US 85 (Exit 9) on the southeastern corner of the limits of Doña Ana. (I-25/US 85 heads northwest toward Radium Springs and Hatch. I-25/US 85 heads southeast toward Las Cruces, Interstate 10/U.S. Route 180, Anthony, and El Paso, Texas.) Just over 200 feet (61 m) northeast of the northbound ramps, NM 320 reaches the "end of state maintenance" and its eastern terminus. (Thorpe Road continues northeast (very briefly as County Road 36) before crossing Del Ray Boulevard and turning south–southeast dead end in an Industrial park.)

== Traffic ==
Annual average daily traffic history (Note: Annual average daily traffic history reflects the highest reported traffic for all sections of the highway. The section with highest reported traffic may vary from year to year and may be affected by additions to and deletions from the highway, as well as highway realignments.)

Annual average daily traffic
Year	AADT
2020	
2019	
2018	
2017	
2016	
2015	6,369
2014	7,915
2013	7,832

The New Mexico Department of Transportation (NMDOT) collects data for the State Roads and Local Federal-Aid roads. Traffic is measured in both directions and reported as Annual Average Daily Traffic (AADT). As of 2015, along is busiest section (at the I-25/US 85 interchange) NM 320 had an AADT of 6,369, a decrease just under 20 percent from the previous year. Also in 2015, the lowest AADT section of NM 320 was between Dona Ana Road and the interstate interchange, with an AADT of 4,773. Interestingly, the section the west end (between the western terminus and Dona Ana Road had a somewhat higher AADT of 5,575.

== Major intersections ==
The entire route is in Doña Ana County.

Location	mi	km	Destinations	Notes
	0.000	0.000	NM 185 north – Radium Springs, Hatch NM 185 south – Las Cruces, Anthony	Western terminus; T intersection
Doña Ana	1.937	3.117	I-25 / US 85 north (CanAm Highway) – Radium Springs, Hatch, Socorro I-25 / US 85 south (CanAm Highway) – Las Cruces, I-10/US 180, Anthony, El Paso (Texas)	Diamond interchange, I-25 Exit 9
Doña Ana	2.000	3.219	End of state maintenance	Eastern terminus
Doña Ana	2.000	3.219	CR 36 east (Thorpe Road)	Continuation east from eastern terminus
1.000 mi = 1.609 km; 1.000 km = 0.621 mi

== See also ==
- List of state roads in New Mexico
