= Hatch Municipal Airport =

- IATA: none; ICAO: none; FAA LID: E05

Summary
- Airport type: Public
- Owner: Village of Hatch
- Serves: Hatch, New Mexico
- Elevation AMSL: 4,129 ft (1,259 m)
- Coordinates: 32°39′37.0512″N 107°11′43.4721″W

Map
- Location of airport in New Mexico

Runways
| Direction | Length | | Surface |
| Direction | ft | m | Surface |
|---|---|---|---|
| 11/29 | 4,110 | 1,253 | Asphalt |

Statistics (2023)
- Aircraft operations (year ending 4/7/2023): 2,500
- Based aircraft: 0
- Source: Federal Aviation Administration

Hatch Municipal Airport (FAA LID: E05) is a city-owned, public airport three miles southwest of the village of Hatch, in Doña Ana County, New Mexico, United States.

E05 is a landing rights airport and is just off NM 26 outside Placitas.

The airport is used largely by general aviation, and the United States military and law enforcement. The nearest commercial airports are El Paso International Airport and Albuquerque International Sunport.

Hatch Chile Festival is held at the Hatch Municipal Airport annually during the Labor Day weekend.

== Facilities and aircraft ==
Hatch Municipal Airport covers 166 acres (67 ha) at an elevation of 4,129 feet (1,259 m) above mean sea level. It has one runway: Runway 11/29 is 4,110 by 60 feet (1,253 x 18 m) asphalt.

In the year ending April 7, 2023, the airport had 2,500 operations, an average of 48 per week: 4% military, 96% general aviation and 4% military.

No aircraft are based at this airport. In addition to general aviation, the airport is used by agricultural aircraft for crop dusting.

== History ==
Hatch Municipal Airport was activated in February 1953. In 2000 it underwent a total reconstruction, which completed the airport runway 11/29 and associated taxiways. The new runway 11/29 was constructed to a width of 60 feet and a length of 4,110 feet. During the reconstruction project, a paved turnaround was added on the south end and a 300 by 300 foot paved apron on the east end of the runway with aircraft tie downs. Subsequent projects have completed a paved access road with vehicle parking, paved taxiways and hangar pad sites for both commercial and agricultural use. Security fencing and automated entrance gates were included in the airport improvements.
