= New Mexico State Road 436 =

State highway in New Mexico, United States

State Road 436

Route information
- Maintained by NMDOT
- Length: 3.541 mi (5.699 km)

Major junctions
- Southern end: NM 187 near Garfield
- Northern end: NM 187 in Derry

Location
- Country: United States
- State: New Mexico
- Counties: Doña Ana, Sierra

Highway system
- New Mexico State Highway System; Interstate; US; State; Scenic
← NM 435	→ NM 438

State Road 436 (NM 436) is a 3.541-mile-long (5.699 km) state highway in the US state of New Mexico. NM 436's southern terminus is at NM 187 south of Garfield, and the northern terminus is at NM 187 in Derry.

== Major intersections ==
County	Location	mi	km	Destinations	Notes
Doña Ana		0.000	0.000	NM 187	Southern terminus
Sierra	Derry	3.541	5.699	NM 187	Northern terminus
1.000 mi = 1.609 km; 1.000 km = 0.621 mi
