= New Mexico State Road 390 =

State highway in New Mexico, United States

State Road 390

Route information
- Maintained by NMDOT
- Length: 4.28 mi (6.89 km)

Major junctions
- Southern end: NM 187 in Salem
- Northern end: NM 187 in Garfield

Location
- Country: United States
- State: New Mexico
- Counties: Doña Ana

Highway system
- New Mexico State Highway System; Interstate; US; State; Scenic
← NM 389	→ NM 391

State Road 390 (NM 390) is a 4.28-mile-long (6.89 km) state highway in the US state of New Mexico. NM 390's southern terminus is at NM 187 in Salem, and the northern terminus is at NM 187 in Garfield.

== Major intersections ==
The entire route is in Doña Ana County.

Location	mi	km	Destinations	Notes
Salem	0.000	0.000	NM 187	Southern terminus
Garfield	4.280	6.888	NM 187	Northern terminus
1.000 mi = 1.609 km; 1.000 km = 0.621 mi
