= Rio Grande Bridge at Radium Springs =

- U.S. National Register of Historic Places
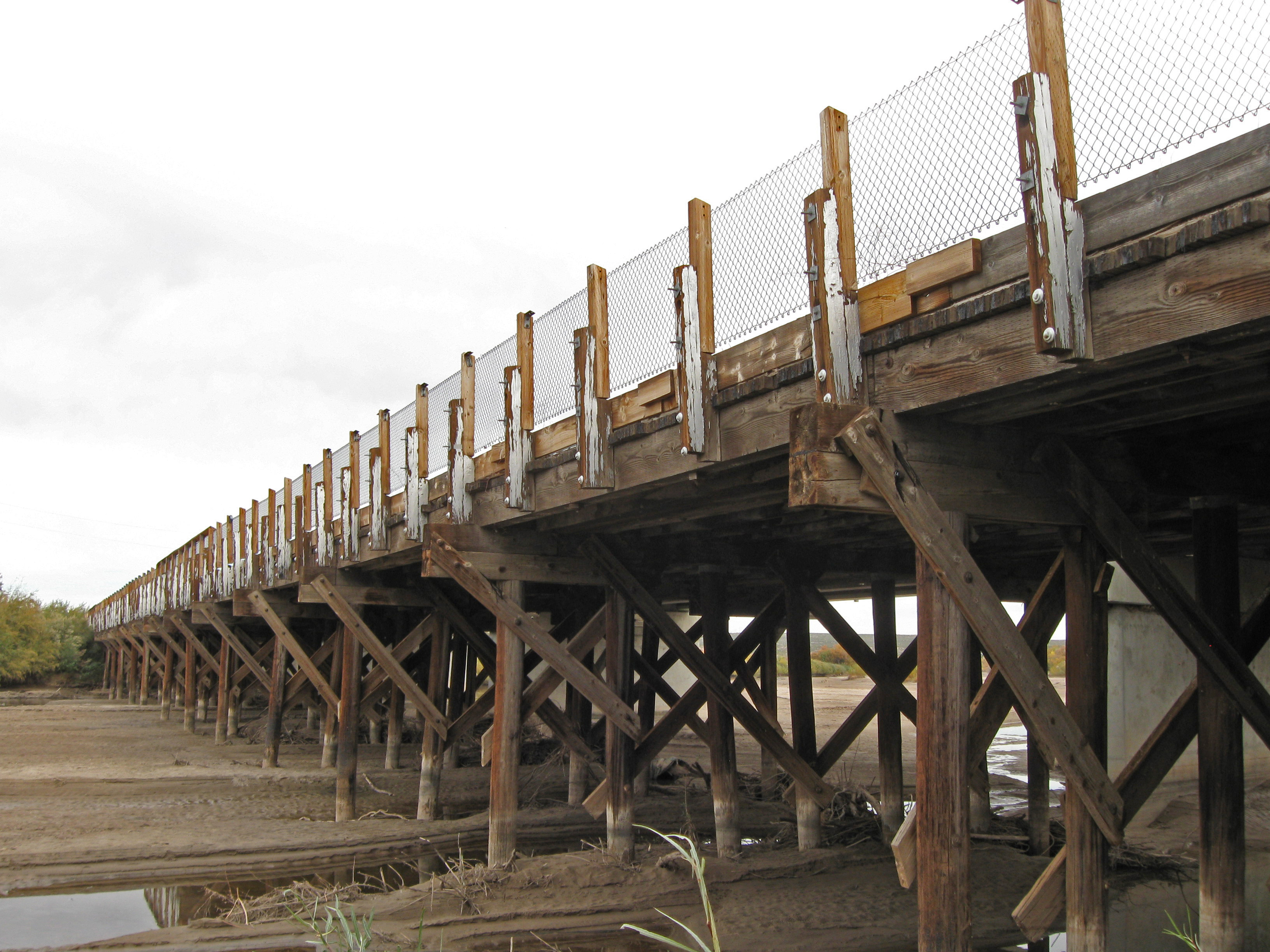

- Location within New Mexico
- Location: NM 185 over Rio Grande, one mile south of Radium Springs, New Mexico
- Coordinates: 32.486393°N 106.925312°W
- Area: less than one acre
- Built: 1933
- Architectural style: timber beam bridge
- MPS: Historic Highway Bridges of New Mexico MPS
- NRHP reference No.: 97000734
- Added to NRHP: July 15, 1997

The Rio Grande Bridge at Radium Springs is a historic timber beam bridge built in 1933. As of 1997, it still carried NM 185 over the Rio Grande, about 1 mile (1.6 km) south of Radium Springs, New Mexico. It was listed on the National Register of Historic Places in 1997.

In Google Streetview imagery captured May 2018, and in Google satellite view, the bridge is unused except by pedestrians, and is seen immediately adjacent to a modern replacement bridge.

It was described by David Kammer in its 1997 NRHP nomination as a 19-span timber beam bridge, crossing the "Rio Grande as it flows in a now well-defined channel some forty miles below Elephant Butte and Caballo Dams. / The substructure consists of 18 creosote-treated timber piers, or bents, each containing seven piles stiffened with diagonal timbers, or sways. The bents measure approximately 12 feet from the waterway to the deck. Timber abutments, protected by steel bulkheads, are located beneath each of the approaches. The superstructure consists of 19 spans, each measuring 25 feet in length. The deck, consisting of a 2" x 4" timbers with an asphalt surface, rests on steel stringers. The roadway is 475 feet long and 29 feet wide and is flanked by timber felloes. The bridge's timber rails are lined with metal guardrails."
