= New Mexico State Road 157 =

State highway in New Mexico, United States

State Road 157
- Fort Selden Road

Route information
- Maintained by NMDOT
- Length: 1.740 mi (2.800 km)
- Existed: 1988–present

Major junctions
- West end: NM 185 in Radium Springs
- East end: I-25 / US 85 in Radium Springs

Location
- Country: United States
- State: New Mexico
- County: Doña Ana

Highway system
- New Mexico State Highway System; Interstate; US; State; Scenic
← NM 156	→ NM 158

State Road 157 (NM 157) is a 1.740-mile-long (2.800 km), paved, two-lane state highway in Doña Ana County in the U.S. state of New Mexico. The highway lies entirely within the community of Radium Springs. NM 157's western terminus is at the road's junction with NM 185. The road's eastern terminus is at the road's junction with Interstate 25 (I-25) and U.S. Route 85 (US 85). NM 157 is also known as Fort Selden Road.

== Route description ==
The highway begins at the junction with NM 185 in the southwest corner of village of Radium Springs. Right after the junction, NM 157 crosses the Leasburg Canal over 79.1-foot-long (24.1 m) bridge built in 1962. The road heads northeast through the residential areas of Radium Springs, passes by Fort Selden State Monument, and after 0.93 miles (1.50 km) crosses railroad tracks of El Paso Subdivision of BNSF Railway. Continuing northeast NM 157 arrives at I-25, crosses it over a 229.0-foot-long (69.8 m) bridge built in 1966, before reaching its northeastern terminus at intersection with the northbound ramps on the east side of I-25. The road continues as Doña Ana County Route E 70 past the junction.

== History ==
The road was constructed in 1960s as a connector between old US 85 and a newly constructed I-25 and was designated as part of the New Mexico State Road 28. In 1988 the New Mexico Department of Transportation (NMDOT) went through a radical road renumbering program, which also included elimination of US 85 in New Mexico. As part of this reorganization, the road through Rincon was designated as NM 157.

== Major intersections ==
The entire route is in Radium Springs, Doña Ana County.

mi	km	Destinations	Notes
0.000	0.000	NM 185 – Hatch, Las Cruces	Western terminus
1.740	2.800	I-25 / US 85 – Albuquerque, Las Cruces	Eastern terminus, I-25 exit 19
1.740	2.800	CR E70	Continuation as CR E70 past I-25
1.000 mi = 1.609 km; 1.000 km = 0.621 mi
