= New Mexico State Road 154 =

State highway in New Mexico, United States

State Road 154
- Railroad Road
- NM 154 highlighted in red

Route information
- Maintained by NMDOT
- Length: 4.189 mi (6.742 km)
- Existed: 1988–present

Major junctions
- West end: NM 185 in Hatch
- East end: NM 140 south of Rincon

Location
- Country: United States
- State: New Mexico
- Counties: Doña Ana

Highway system
- New Mexico State Highway System; Interstate; US; State; Scenic
| ← NM 153 | → NM 156 |

State Road 154 (NM 154) is a 4.189-mile-long (6.742 km), paved, two-lane state highway in Doña Ana County in the U.S. state of New Mexico. NM 154's western terminus is in Hatch at the road's junction with NM 185. The road's eastern terminus is in Rincon at the road's junction with NM 140. NM 154 is also known as Railroad Road.

== Route description ==
NM 154 parallels the railroad tracks of the El Paso Subdivision of BNSF Railway. The highway begins at the junction with NM 185 in the village of Hatch. The road heads east-northeast through the fields and pecan orchards of Rincon Valley and after 1.68 miles (2.70 km) crosses the Rio Grande river over a 476.1-foot-long (145.1 m) bridge, built in 1941. The road continues through agricultural area farther for approximately another 1 mile, before turning east. At 4.189 miles (6.742 km) NM 154 reaches its northeastern terminus at intersection with NM 140. The road continues as Doña Ana County Route E 10 past the junction.

== History ==
A road from Hatch to Rincon was constructed some time in early 1940s. In early 1950s the road connecting NM 185 with Rincon passing through Hatch was designated NM 140. In 1988 the New Mexico Department of Transportation (NMDOT) went through a radical road renumbering program, and the stretch from Rincon to Hatch became known as NM 154, whereas the section from Rincon south to NM-185 was designated as NM 140.

== Major intersections ==
The entire route is in Doña Ana County.

| Location | mi | km | Destinations | Notes |
|---|---|---|---|---|
| Hatch | 0.000 | 0.000 | NM 185 – Hatch, Las Cruces | Western terminus |
| | 4.189 | 6.742 | NM 140 – Rincon | Eastern terminus |
1.000 mi = 1.609 km; 1.000 km = 0.621 mi

== See also ==
- List of state roads in New Mexico
