= New Mexico State Road 140 =

State highway in New Mexico, United States

State Road 140

Route information
- Maintained by NMDOT
- Length: 2.828 mi (4.551 km)

Major junctions
- South end: NM 185 near Rincon
- North end: I-25 / US 85 near Rincon

Location
- Country: United States
- State: New Mexico
- Counties: Doña Ana

Highway system
- New Mexico State Highway System; Interstate; US; State; Scenic
← NM 138	→ NM 142

State Road 140 (NM 140) is a 2.828-mile-long (4.551 km), paved, two-lane state highway in Doña Ana County in the U.S. state of New Mexico. NM 140's southern terminus is south of Rincon at the road's junction with NM 185. The road's northern terminus is north of Rincon at the road's junction with Interstate 25 (I-25) and U.S. Route 85 (US 85). The road continues as Doña Ana County Route E 016 (CR E 016) north of I-25. In Rincon NM 140 is also known as Rincon Road.

== Route description ==
The highway begins at the junction with NM 185 south of Rincon. The road heads north through the fields of Rincon Valley and after 0.45 miles (0.72 km) crosses the Rio Grande river over a 400.3-foot-long (122.0 m) bridge, built in 1975. The road continues north through agricultural areas and at 1.300 miles (2.092 km) intersects with NM 154. The highway then turns northeasterly and travels through the community of Rincon, passing by BNSF Railroad Depot, proceeds under I-25 overpass, before reaching its northeastern terminus at intersection with I-25.

== History ==
The road connecting US 85 with Rincon first appears on roadmaps dating back from early 1930s. An alternative route from Rincon to Hatch was constructed some time in early 1940s. In early 1950s the road connecting NM 185 with Rincon passing through Hatch was designated NM 140. In 1988 the New Mexico Department of Transportation (NMDOT) went through a radical road renumbering program, and the stretch from Rincon to Hatch became known as NM 154, whereas the section from Rincon south to NM-185 was designated as NM 140.

== Major intersections ==
The entire route is in Doña Ana County.

Location	mi	km	Destinations	Notes
	0.000	0.000	NM 185 – Hatch, Las Cruces	Southern terminus
Rincon	1.300	2.092	NM 154 west – Hatch	Eastern terminus of NM 154
Rincon	2.828	4.551	I-25 / US 85 – Albuquerque, Las Cruces	Northern terminus, I-25 exit 35
Rincon	2.828	4.551	CR E16	Continuation beyond I-25
1.000 mi = 1.609 km; 1.000 km = 0.621 mi
