= Rodey, New Mexico =

- Census-designated place
- Location within New Mexico
- Coordinates: 32°39′14″N 107°08′09″W
- Country: United States
- State: New Mexico
- County: Doña Ana

Area
  - Total: 0.56 sq mi (1.45 km^{2})
  - Land: 0.56 sq mi (1.45 km^{2})
  - Water: 0 sq mi (0.00 km^{2})
- Elevation: 4,075 ft (1,242 m)

Population (2020)
  - Total: 337
  - Density: 603.0/sq mi (232.83/km^{2})
- Time zone: UTC-7 (Mountain (MST))
  - Summer (DST): UTC-6 (MDT)
- Area code: 575
- GNIS feature ID: 2584195

Rodey is a census-designated place and colonia in Doña Ana County, New Mexico, United States. As of the 2020 census, Rodey had a population of 337. The community is located on the southeast border of Hatch along New Mexico State Road 185 .

== Geography ==
According to the U.S. Census Bureau, the community has an area of 0.564 square miles (1.46 km^{2}), all land.

== Demographics ==
Historical population
Census	Pop.	Note	%±
2020	337		—
U.S. Decennial Census

== Education ==
It is zoned to Hatch Valley Public Schools.
