= Lake Valley, Sierra County, New Mexico =

Ghost town in Sierra County, New Mexico, United States

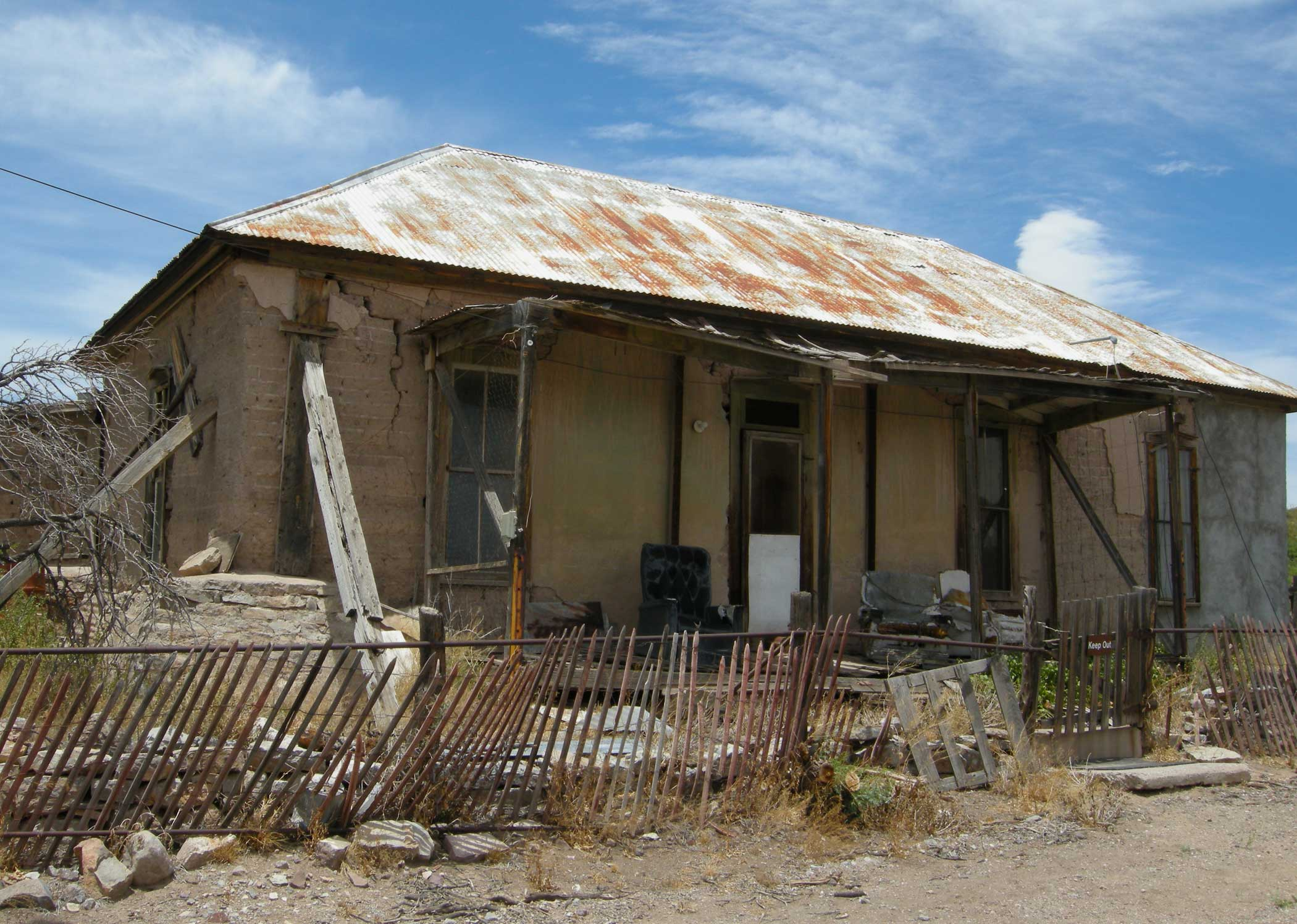
Former Bella Hotel in Lake Valley.

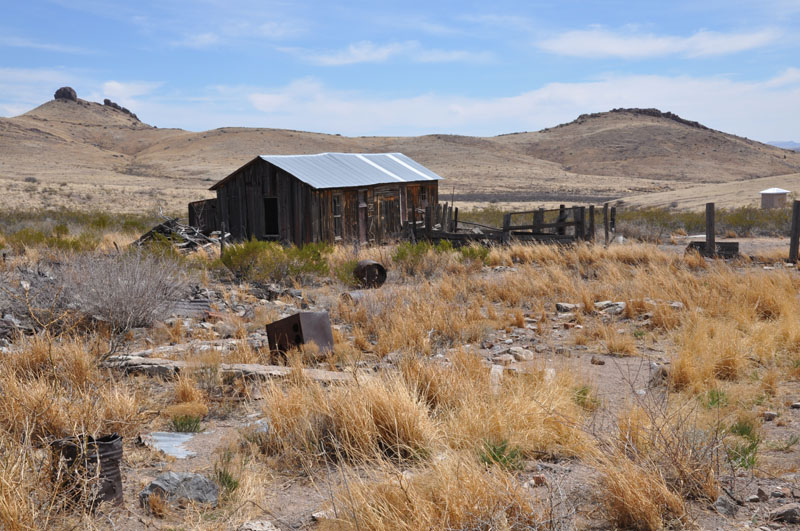
Lake Valley Historic Site.

Lake Valley was a silver-mining town in Sierra County, U.S. state of New Mexico.

The 'heyday' of the town was from 1881 to 1893. The last resident departed in 1994.

The present day ghost town is deserted.

== Access ==
The townsite of Lake Valley is partly privately owned, and partly owned by the U.S. Bureau of Land Management, which has restricted access to the old buildings to daylight hours, to prevent vandalism. There is a self-guided walking tour for visitors. The town is closed to the public on Tuesdays and Wednesdays.

== History ==
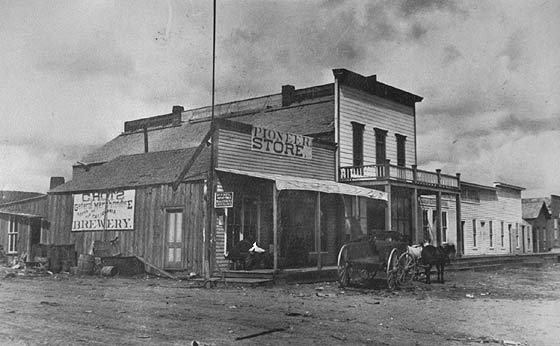
Lake Valley around 1890

A rancher found the Lake Valley silver deposits in Sierra County in 1876. Two years later he sold his claims to an engineer, who began mining. The deposits are bedded manto-type deposits in Paleozoic limestone. The mines produced well for a few years after miners tunneled into a silver-lined cavity they named the "bridal chamber" that alone yielded 2.5 million troy ounces (78 tonnes) of silver.

In 1881 the property was sold to mine promoters George D. Roberts and Whitaker Wright, who split the property among five companies: Sierra Apache Co., Sierra Bella Co., Sierra Grande Co., Sierra Madre Co., and the Sierra Plata Co., and stock was sold widely in the east. Despite the brief wealth of the bridal chamber, shareholders in all five companies lost money.

In 1881, a party of Lake Valley miners formed a posse to pursue a band of Apaches that had raided the town of Hillsboro. The Apaches caught them in an ambush. The bridal chamber was worked out by 1883. Although a railroad line reached Lake Valley in 1884, the mines struggled and were worked only periodically into the 20th century. Total production of the Lake Valley district through 1931 was 5.8 million ounces (180 tonnes) of silver. The mines reopened during World War II to produce manganese, and continued operating into the 1950s. Lake Valley had a post office from 1882 until 1955.

== Geography ==
The townsite is along NM 27, 17 miles (27 km) south of Hillsboro, and 36 miles (58 km) west of Hatch, at 32°43′04″N 107°34′04″W. It is at an elevation of 5,377 feet (1,639 m) in Sierra County.

== Geology ==
Lake Valley is located in a structurally elevated fault block underlain mainly by Ordovician through Pennsylvanian sedimentary rocks; ore deposits are stratabound and confined to Lower Mississippian Lake Valley Limestone carbonate rocks. The Lake Valley and Berrenda faults are the major structural features in the area.

== Notable people ==
- "Longhair" Jim Courtright, became town sheriff in 1882
- Benjamin Silliman Jr. examined the properties as a mining consultant
- Whitaker Wright visited the properties and organized the mining companies

== See also ==
- List of ghost towns in New Mexico
