= New Mexico State Road 27 =

State highway in New Mexico, United States

State Road 27

Route information
- Maintained by NMDOT
- Length: 30.200 mi (48.602 km)
- Existed: 1905–present

Major junctions
- South end: NM 26 in Nutt
- North end: NM 152 in Hillsboro

Location
- Country: United States
- State: New Mexico
- Counties: Sierra, Luna

Highway system
- New Mexico State Highway System; Interstate; US; State; Scenic
← NM 26	→ NM 28

New Mexico State Road 27 (NM 27) is a 30.200-mile-long (48.602 km) paved, two-lane state highway in Sierra and Luna counties in the U.S. state of New Mexico. It travels south-to-north over the eastern flank of the Black Range.

The southern terminus of NM 27 is at intersection with NM 26 near a ghost town of Nutt. The northern terminus is in Hillsboro where it intersects NM 152.

NM 27 is a part of Lake Valley Back Country Byway.

== Route description ==
The highway begins in a ghost town of Nutt. Formerly this was the point at which the spur left the main trunk of the Atchison, Topeka and Santa Fe Railway railroad and headed north to a mining community of Lake Valley. For the first 3.700-mile-long (5.955 km) NM 27 runs concurrently with Luna County CR A027. The road passes through the Chihuahuan grasslands between the Nutt and Round Mountains. At 12.9 miles NM 27 reaches a former mining town of Lake Valley. The town is a preserved ghost town most famous for its silver mining. Silver was first discovered here in 1876 and for the period from 1878 through 1931 5.8 million ounces or 180 metric tons of silver was mined. At 17.3 miles the road crosses Berrenda Creek with a few agricultural fields in the vicinity. Shortly after, the road passes by North and South Sibley Mountains named after a confederate general Henry H. Sibley. After passing a 22-mile mark, the highway crosses the Tierra Blanca Creek, and at 23.5 miles Oak Spring Creek. The road then turns further northwest and continues on for the next 5.2 miles before taking a turn to north-northeast right before reaching Hillsboro. At 30.2 miles NM 27 reaches its northern terminus at NM 152.

== History ==
NM 27 was initially a part of the original Route 26 created in 1905 by the Territorial Legislative Assembly. The old Route 26 ran from Deming, through Nutt, Hillsboro, Truth or Consequences to Engle. The stretch from Nutt to Hatch was designated as Route 27. In 1930s the Route 26 was shortened with the northern terminus shifting from Engle to Hillsboro. During early 1940s Route 26 was re-routed towards Hatch, and the road to Hillsboro became Route 27. The road was considered a secondary state route from its early days and remained either "graded" or "gravel" until it was paved some time in 1960s.

== Major intersections ==
County	Location	mi	km	Destinations	Notes
Luna	Nutt	0.000	0.000	NM 26 – Deming, Hatch	Southern terminus
Sierra	Hillsboro	30.200	48.602	NM 152 – Santa Clara, Caballo	Northern terminus
1.000 mi = 1.609 km; 1.000 km = 0.621 mi
