= Hillsboro High School (New Mexico) =

- U.S. National Register of Historic Places
- NM State Register of Cultural Properties
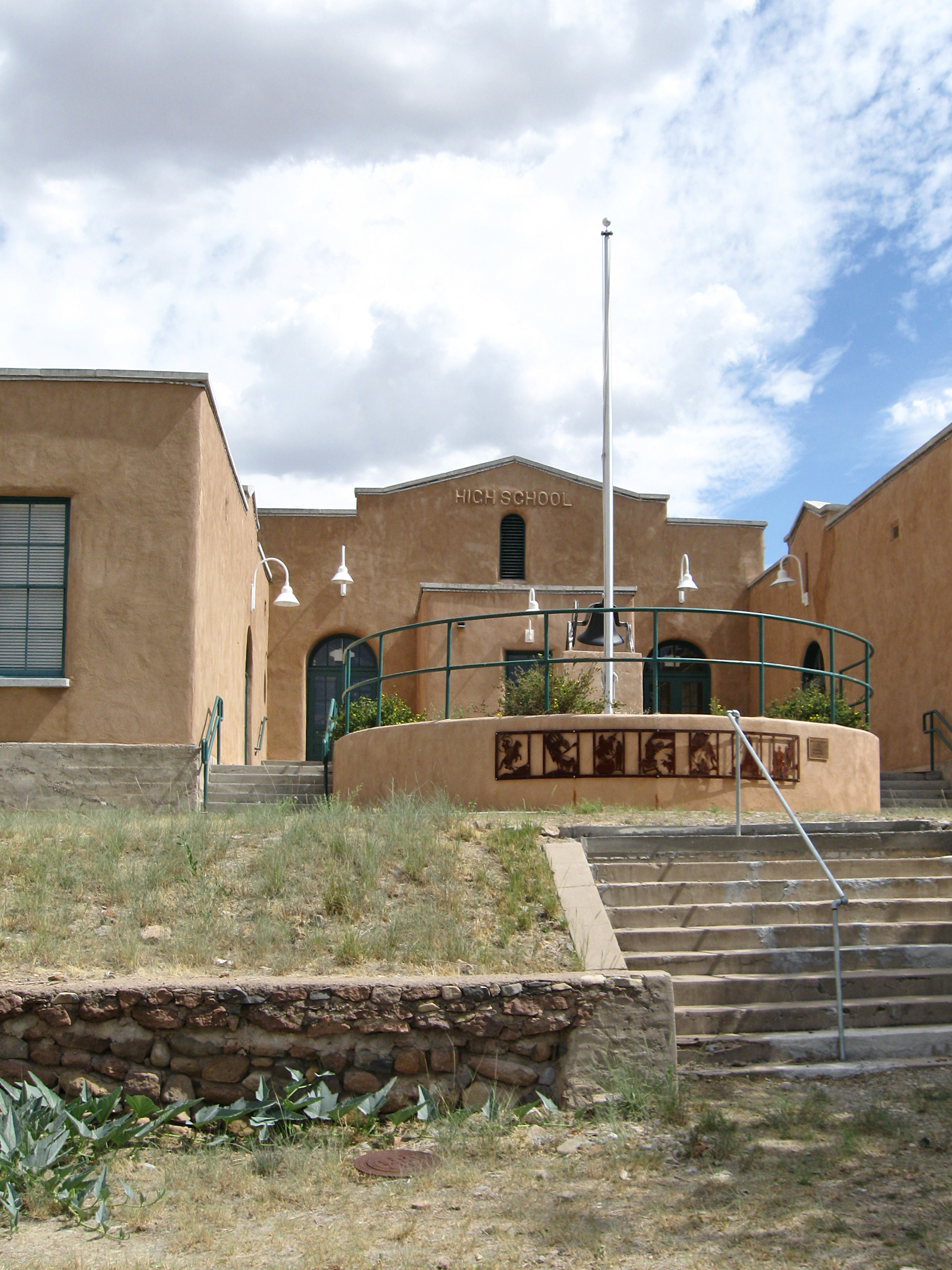

- Location within New Mexico Location within the United States
- Location: Jct. of Elenora St. and First Ave., SE corner, Hillsboro, New Mexico
- Coordinates: 32°55′10″N 107°34′1″W
- Area: less than one acre
- Built: 1922
- Architect: Trost & Trost Architects $ Engineers
- Architectural style: Mission/Spanish Revival
- NRHP reference No.: 93000254
- NMSRCP No.: 1549

Significant dates
- Added to NRHP: April 15, 1993
- Designated NMSRCP: February 19, 1993

The Hillsboro High School, in Hillsboro, New Mexico, is a historic Mission/Spanish Revival-style school building that was built in 1922. It was designed by El Paso–based architects Trost and Trost.

Located on the southeast corner of Elenora St. and First Ave., it has also been known as Sierra County High School and it has been designated SR 1304. It was listed on the National Register of Historic Places in 1993.

The building is now home to Hillsboro Community Center.

It was the first dedicated four-year high school building in Sierra County and the first secondary school open to all county students. According to a 1994 report on historic resources in the county: "Most students were from Hillsboro but a few came from Kingston, Lake Valley and other Sierra County communities. Students from nearby ranches traveled to school on horseback. Some families rented or purchased homes in Hillsboro so that their children could attend high school. Other students boarded in town and by 1924 a "bachelor hall" was furnished for the convenience of self-supporting students."

== See also ==
- National Register of Historic Places listings in Sierra County, New Mexico
