= Meyers House (Hillsboro, New Mexico) =

Historic house in New Mexico, United States

- U.S. National Register of Historic Places
- NM State Register of Cultural Properties
- Location within New Mexico Location within the United States
- Location: Main St. N side between 4th and 5th Aves., Hillsboro, New Mexico
- Coordinates: 32°55′12″N 107°34′15″W
- Area: less than one acre
- Built: c.1902
- Architectural style: Late Victorian vernacular
- MPS: Hillsboro MPS
- NRHP reference No.: 95000463
- NMSRCP No.: 1605

Significant dates
- Added to NRHP: April 20, 1995
- Designated NMSRCP: November 18, 1994

Meyers House in Hillsboro, New Mexico was built in c.1902. It is an L-shaped one-story house with Late Victorian vernacular architecture.

== History ==
It was home of Charles H. Meyers, who immigrated from Germany as a stowaway in about 1860. He prospected for silver in Lake Valley and prospected for gold in Hillsboro, then opened The Green Room saloon in Hillsboro.

== Importance ==
It was listed on the National Register of Historic Places in 1995.

== See also ==
- National Register of Historic Places listings in Sierra County, New Mexico
