= Sullivan House =

Sullivan House may refer to:

Listed alphabetically by state

- Sullivan Roadhouse, Delta Junction, AK, listed on the NRHP in Alaska
- G. H. Sullivan Lodging House, Kingman, AZ, listed on the NRHP in Arizona
- Sullivan–Hillyer House, Rome, GA, listed on the NRHP in Georgia
- Sullivan-Kinney House, Pocatello, ID, listed on the NRHP in Idaho
- Joseph P. O. Sullivan House, Maywood, IL, listed on the NRHP in Illinois
- Bond–Sullivan House, Wichita, KS, listed on the NRHP in Kansas
- Sullivan House (Bogalusa, Louisiana), listed on the NRHP in Louisiana
- Edward Sullivan House, Winchester, MA, listed on the NRHP in Massachusetts
- Daniel O'Sullivan House/Halfway House, Flushing, MI, listed on the NRHP in Michigan
- Johnson–Sullivant House, Kosciusko, MS, listed on the NRHP in Mississippi
- James J. Sullivan House, Hardin, MT, listed on the NRHP in Montana
- Sullivan Rooming House, Hardin, MT, listed on the NRHP in Montana
- John Sullivan House, Durham, NH, listed on the NRHP in New Hampshire
- Roger Sullivan House, Manchester, NH, listed on the NRHP in New Hampshire
- Sullivan House (Manchester, New Hampshire), listed on the NRHP in New Hampshire
- Cornelius Sullivan House, Hillsboro, NM, listed on the NRHP in New Mexico
- Sullivan House (Laurens, South Carolina), listed on the NRHP in South Carolina
- Sullivan Farm House, alternate named of the Robert Hodge House, Franklin, TN, listed on the NRHP in Tennessee
- James R. and Mary E. Sullivan House, Park City, UT, listed on the NRHP in Utah
