= Hatch Valley Public Schools =

School district in New Mexico, United States

Hatch Valley Public Schools is a school district headquartered in Hatch, New Mexico.

In addition to Hatch, the district's area includes Garfield, Placitas, Rincon, Rodey, and Salem.

== History ==
In February 2021, during the COVID-19 pandemic in New Mexico, the district decided that as its students needed to compete in the New Mexico Activities Association, it would need to enact hybrid learning.

Around 2022, the W.K. Kellogg Foundation donated $300,000, which the district planned to use to increase its agriculture-based programs.

== Schools ==
Secondary

- Hatch Valley High School
- Hatch Valley Middle School

Primary

- Garfield Elementary School
- Hatch Valley Elementary School
- Rio Grande Elementary School
