= Will M. Robins House =

- U.S. National Register of Historic Places
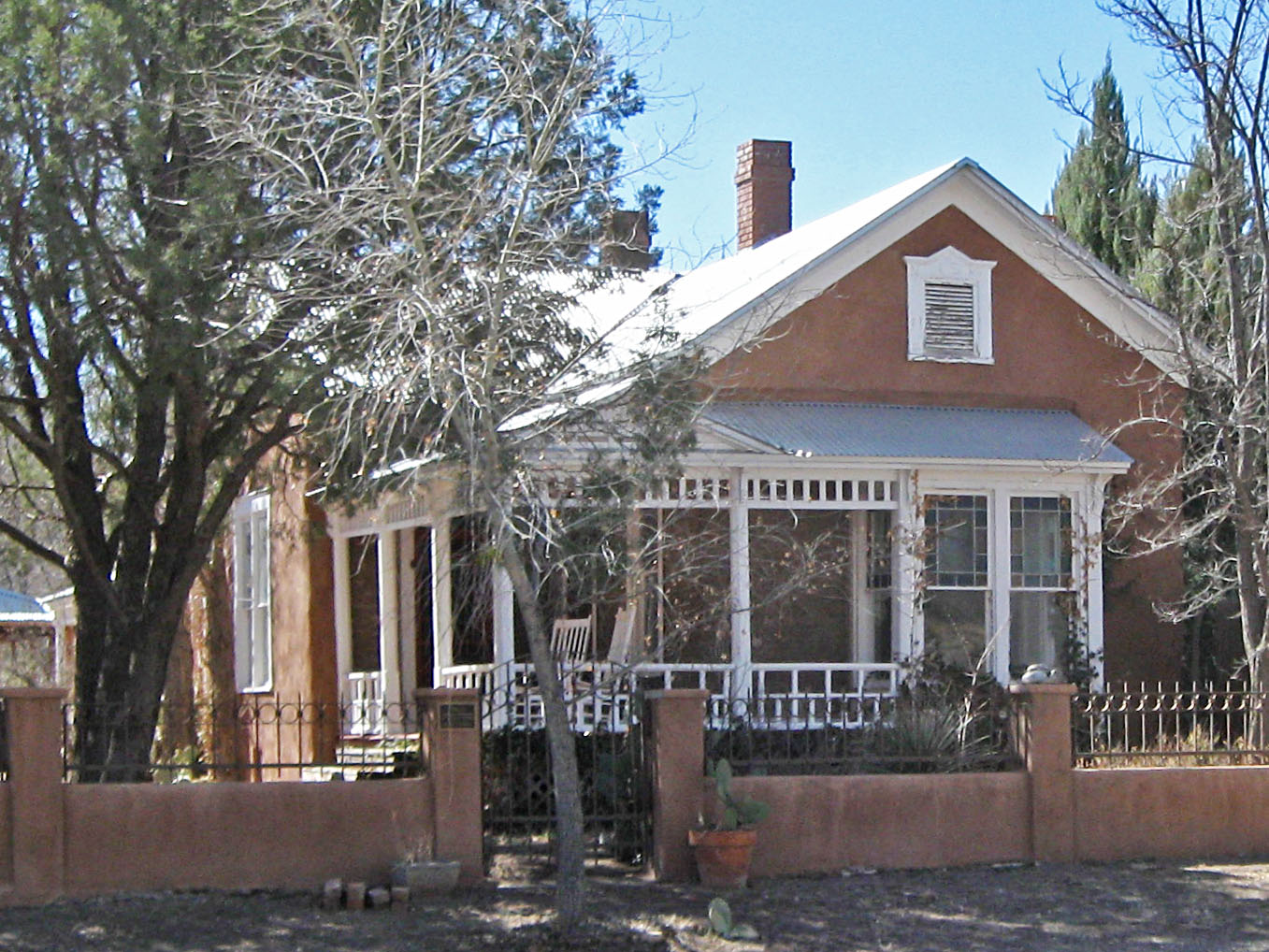
- Location: Jct. of Main St. and Fifth Ave., SW corner, Hillsboro, New Mexico
- Coordinates: 32°55′10″N 107°34′18″W
- Area: less than one acre
- Architectural style: Late Victorian, Late Victorian Vernacular
- MPS: Hillsboro MPS
- NRHP reference No.: 95000462
- Added to NRHP: April 20, 1995

The Will M. Robins House, at the southwest corner of Main St. and Fifth Ave. in Hillsboro, New Mexico, was listed on the National Register of Historic Places in 1995.

It is a one-story adobe building whose first two rooms were built before 1893. It was expanded before 1930 and modified again in 1960. It was further modified by a film company making the movie Cheatin' Hearts in 1991.

A second contributing building in the listing is a combination stone cistern and wellhouse.
