= Alert-Hatcher Building =

- U.S. National Register of Historic Places
- Location within New Mexico
- Location: Jct. of Second Ave. and Main St., SE corner, Hillsboro, New Mexico
- Coordinates: 32.920107°N 107.569285°W
- Area: less than one acre
- Built: 1884
- Architectural style: New Mexico Vernacular
- MPS: Hillsboro MPS
- NRHP reference No.: 95000460
- Added to NRHP: April 20, 1995

The Alert-Hatcher Building, in Hillsboro, New Mexico, was built in 1884. It was listed on the National Register of Historic Places in 1995.

It is a "long, basically L-shaped, one-story, New Mexico Vernacular building extending along the south side of Main Street and up the east side of Second Avenue".
