= John M. Webster House =

- U.S. National Register of Historic Places
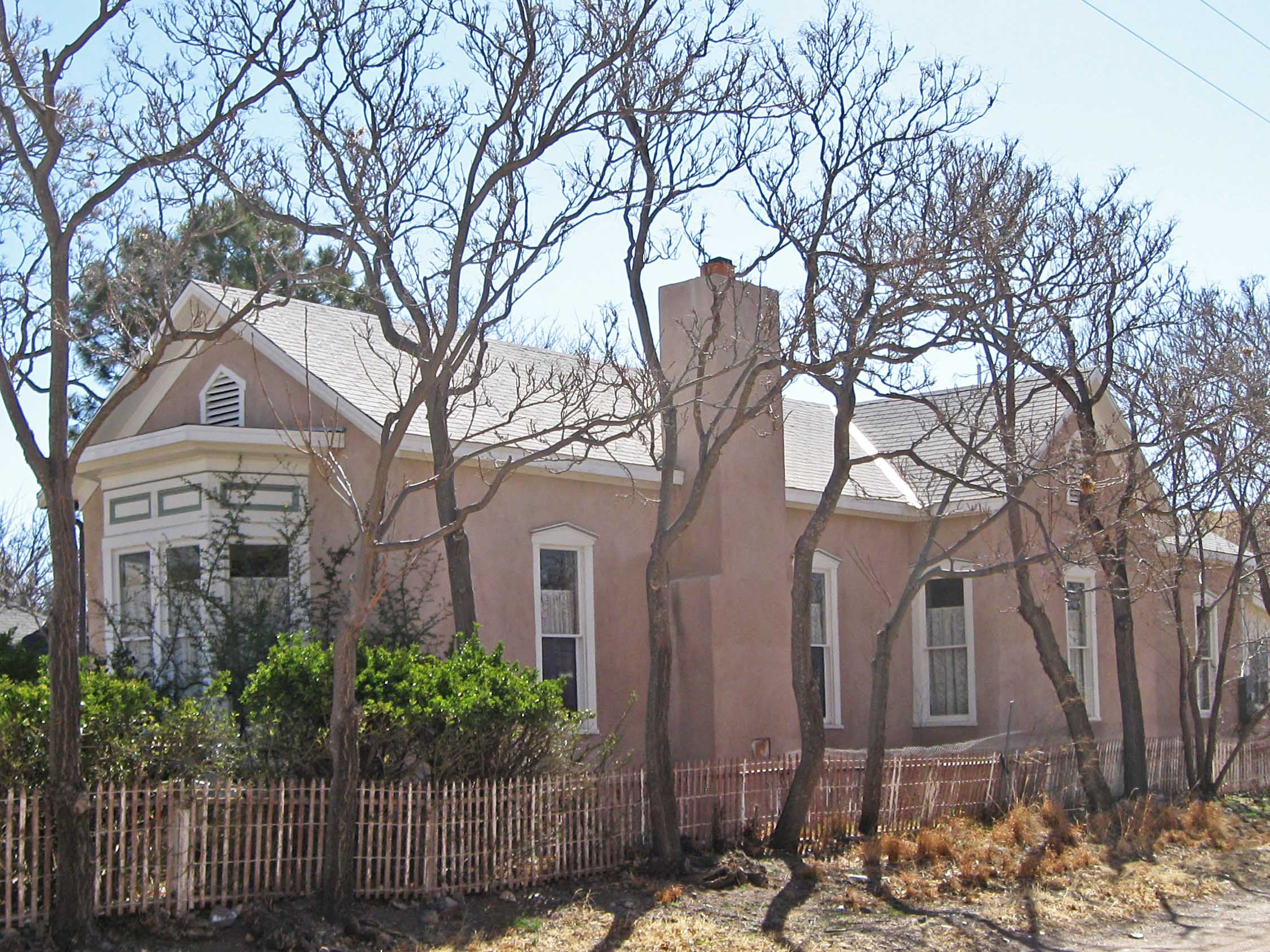

- Location within New Mexico
- Location: Jct. of Main St. and Fifth Ave., SE corner, Hillsboro, New Mexico
- Coordinates: 32°55′10″N 107°34′16″W
- Area: less than one acre
- Built: 1893
- Architectural style: Late Victorian, Late Victorian Vernacular
- MPS: Hillsboro MPS
- NRHP reference No.: 95000464
- Added to NRHP: April 20, 1995

The John M. Webster House, in Hillsboro, New Mexico, was built in 1893. It was listed on the National Register of Historic Places in 1995. It is located at the southeast corner of the junction of Main St. and 5th Ave.

It is a one-story adobe, Late Victorian Vernacular house. It was deemed "architecturally significant as an example of the realization in locally obtainable materials of an imported style which incorporates the form, siting, and decoration characteristic of vernacular building in the Victorian era. Typical elements are the front and cross gables forming the original T-shape, the front bay window, the side porch, and side front entrance."
