= George Tambling Miller and Ninette Stocker Miller House =

- George Tambling and Ninette Stocker Miller House
- U.S. National Register of Historic Places
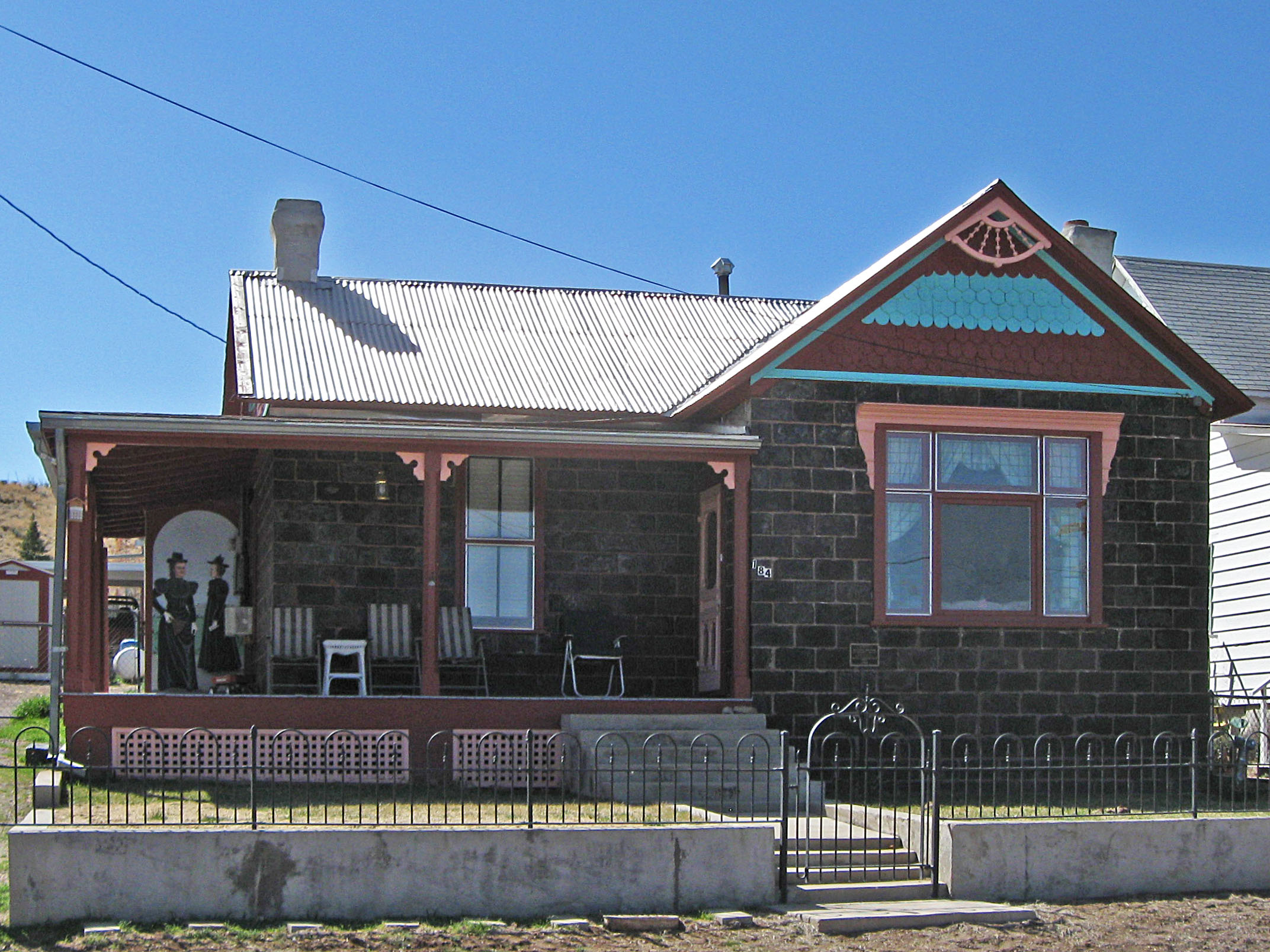
- Location: 184 Elenora St. S side, W of Union Church, Hillsboro, New Mexico
- Coordinates: 32°55′09″N 107°34′05″W
- Area: less than one acre
- Built: 1894
- Built by: Galles, Peter; Lewis, J. M.
- Architectural style: Late Victorian, Late Victorian Vernacular
- MPS: Hillsboro MPS
- NRHP reference No.: 95000465
- Added to NRHP: April 20, 1995

The George Tambling and Ninette Stocker Miller House, located in Hillsboro, New Mexico, is a Late Victorian vernacular house built in 1894. It was listed on the National Register of Historic Places in 1995.

"Built in 1894 by George Tambling Miller (b.1866) and his wife Ninette Stocker Miller, this is a one-story, late Victorian Vernacular dwelling constructed of locally produced black slag blocks. The blocks weigh about 130 pounds each and were made by pouring molten slag into metal molds.

"A sample of slag from the house was tested in 1993 by the New Mexico Bureau of Mines & Mineral Resources at the New Mexico Institute of Mining & Technology in Socorro, New Mexico. Analytical results indicated that the sample contained small amounts of lead, copper, and zinc, comprising less than 1% of the slag mass. The remaining more than 99% percent is made up of such compounds as iron silicate which gives rise to the brownish crystalline texture of the material. The presence of copper in relatively high amounts strongly suggests that the samples originated from the Hillsboro smelter, the only copper smelter in the area.

"In April of 1894 Miller contracted with Peter Galles and J.M. Lewis to "erect, build and finish the carpenter work on one slag house on lot 3 Block 6 adjoining the Union Church Building Hillsboro, New Mexico. "Some of the lumber used in the house came from the Burge Gallery, formerly of Kingston, New Mexico, presumably the photography studio of J. C. Burge. Earlier in the month Ninette Miller had bought the land at a Sheriff's sale for $3.00.

[George T.] "Miller was an avid and accomplished photographer. He noted in his diary pictures taken as he traveled across the country to New Mexico. Soon after his arrival, he photographed the Richmond Mill for Messrs Oliver and Underwood. He acquired negatives of a photo studio that closed about 1893, thought to be that of J. C. Burge and used an 8 x 10 view camera which he purchased from an itinerant photographer to record his home and various local scenes including stagecoaches of the Lake Valley-Hillsboro run."

It is located on the south side of Elenora St., west of Union Church.
