= New Mexico State Road 185 =

State highway in New Mexico, United States

State Road 185

Route information
- Maintained by NMDOT
- Length: 35.397 mi (56.966 km)

Major junctions
- South end: US 70 / NM 188 in Las Cruces
- North end: NM 26 in Hatch

Location
- Country: United States
- State: New Mexico
- Counties: Doña Ana

Highway system
- New Mexico State Highway System; Interstate; US; State; Scenic
| ← NM 184 | → NM 186 |

State Road 185 (NM 185) is a 35.397-mile-long (56.966 km) state highway in the US state of New Mexico. NM 185's southern terminus is at U.S. Route 70 (US 70) and the northern terminus of NM 188 in Las Cruces, and the northern terminus is at NM 26 in Hatch.

== History ==
NM 185 was once part of a former routing of US 85.

== Major intersections ==
The entire route is in Doña Ana County.

| Location | mi | km | Destinations | Notes |
|---|---|---|---|---|
| Las Cruces | 0.000 | 0.000 | US 70 / NM 188 south | Southern terminus; northern terminus of NM 188 |
| | 5.091 | 8.193 | NM 320 east | Western terminus of NM 320 |
| | 8.371 | 13.472 | NM 158 east | Western terminus of NM 158 |
| Radium Springs | 13.948 | 22.447 | NM 157 east to I-25 / US 85 | Western terminus of NM 157; to I-25 exit 19 |
| | 30.407 | 48.935 | NM 140 north to I-25 / US 85 | Southern terminus of NM 140; to I-25 exit 35 |
| Hatch | 34.995 | 56.319 | NM 154 east | Western terminus of NM 154 |
| Hatch | 35.397 | 56.966 | NM 26 | Northern terminus |
1.000 mi = 1.609 km; 1.000 km = 0.621 mi

== See also ==
- List of state roads in New Mexico
