= Hillsboro Peak Lookout Tower and Cabin =

- U.S. National Register of Historic Places
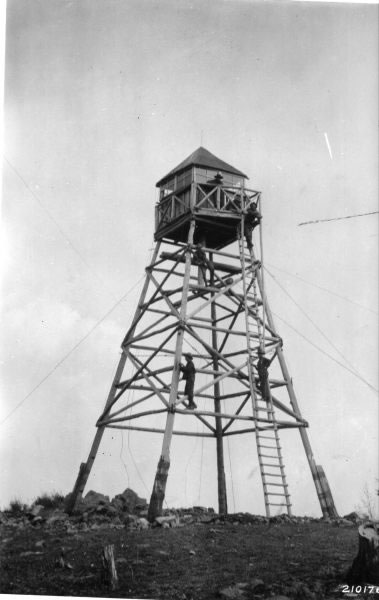
- U.S. Forest Service photo from the mid-1920's (not the current tower)

- Location within New Mexico
- Location: Gila National Forest, near Hillsboro, New Mexico
- Coordinates: 32°57′09″N 107°46′43″W
- Area: less than one acre
- Built: 1925
- MPS: National Forest Fire Lookouts in the Southwestern Region TR
- NRHP reference No.: 87002475
- Added to NRHP: January 28, 1988

The Hillsboro Peak Lookout Tower and Cabin, in Gila National Forest in Sierra County, New Mexico, is a forest fire lookout tower and cabin with one or both built in 1925. The combination was listed on the National Register of Historic Places in 1988.

Hillsboro Peak has elevation 10,020 feet (3,050 m), and is in southwestern New Mexico's Black Range.

The lookout tower, in a 2007 photo, appears to be different than the 1920s tower.

The log cabin is reportedly available for public use overnight.
