= William H. Bucher House =

- U.S. National Register of Historic Places
- Location within New Mexico
- Location: 300 W. Main St., Hillsboro, New Mexico
- Coordinates: 32°55′11″N 107°34′11″W
- Area: less than one acre
- Architectural style: New Mexico Vernacular
- MPS: Hillsboro MPS
- NRHP reference No.: 95000461
- Added to NRHP: April 20, 1995

The William H. Bucher House, at 300 W. Main St. in Hillsboro, New Mexico, was listed on the National Register of Historic Places in 1995.

It is an irregularly shaped adobe house with a front gable. It is New Mexico Vernacular in style.
