= Percha Creek Bridge =

- U.S. National Register of Historic Places
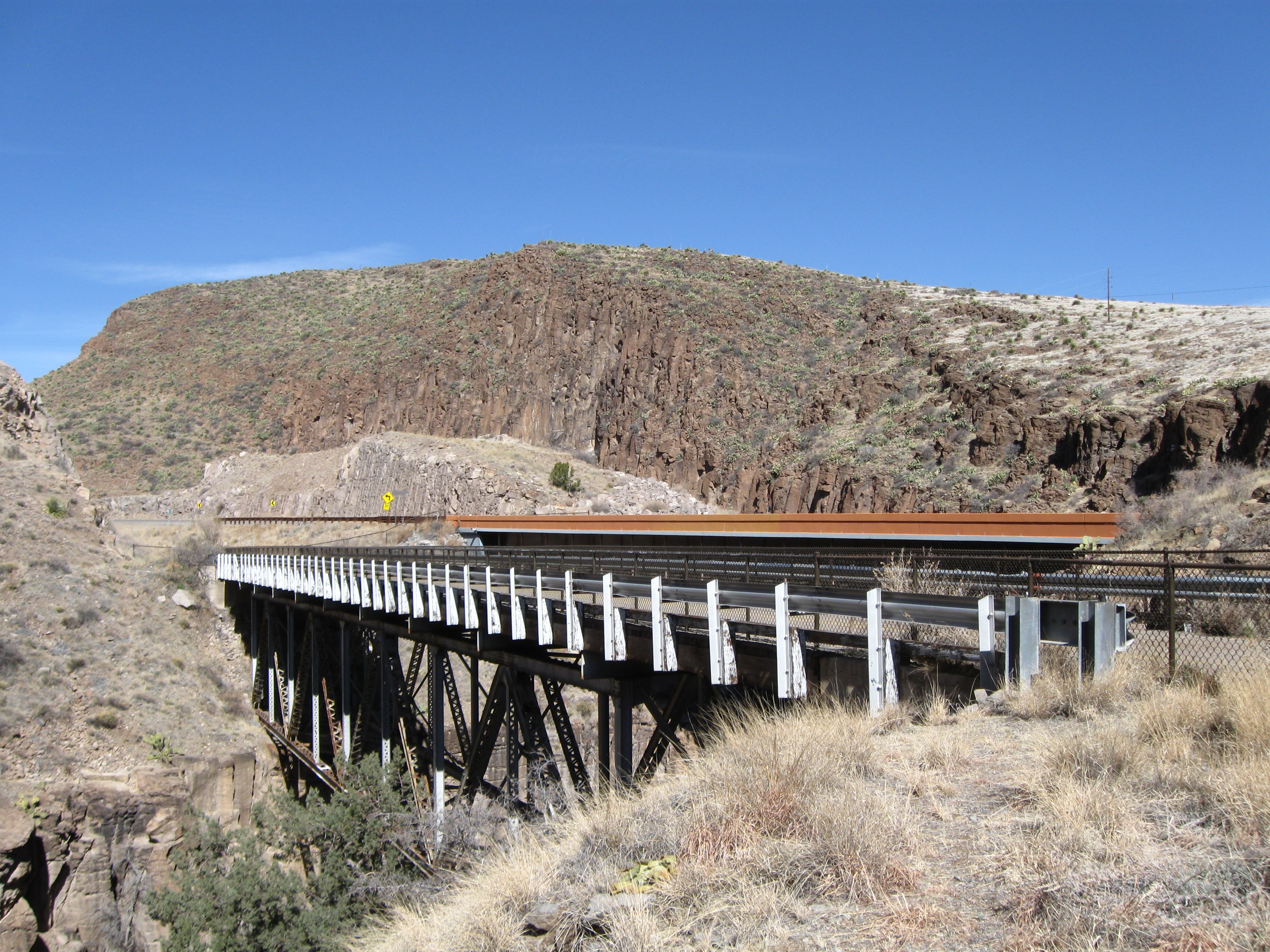

- Location within New Mexico
- Location: NM 90 over Percha Cr., Hillsboro, New Mexico
- Coordinates: 32°55′00″N 107°36′21″W
- Area: less than one acre
- Built: 1927
- Engineer: William S. Henderson
- Architectural style: steel deck truss bridge
- MPS: Historic Highway Bridges of New Mexico MPS
- NRHP reference No.: 97000731
- Added to NRHP: July 15, 1997

The Percha Creek Bridge near Hillsboro, New Mexico formerly brought New Mexico State Road 90 NM 90 over Percha Creek.

It was built in 1927. It was bypassed in 1995 but preserved by the NMSHTD, and it was listed on the National Register of Historic Places in 1997.

It is a single span Warren design steel deck truss bridge, built by the Ware Company of El Paso.

It spans a deep canyon (about 120 feet (37 m) deep) of the Rio Percha, or Percha Creek, on its eastward descent from the Black Range toward the Rio Grande River.

It is located 10 yards south of New Mexico State Road 152, 2 miles (3.2 km) west of Hillsboro.

The span is 160 feet (49 m) and is approached by two 25 feet (7.6 m) approach spans; the roadway is 210 feet (64 m) long and 19 feet (5.8 m) wide. It has a timber deck, covered with asphalt.

William S. Henderson was the engineer.

The bridge was deemed significant in part as "the oldest and highest rated bridge Warren design steel deck truss bridge in New Mexico, embodying the design, materials and methods of construction associated with that bridge sub-type."
