= Southwestern Railroad (New Mexico) =

Overview
- Headquarters: Deming, New Mexico
- Reporting mark: SW
- Locale: Southwestern New Mexico
- Dates of operation: 1990-2026–
- Predecessor: Burlington Northern Santa Fe

Technical
- Track gauge: 4 ft 8 1/2 in (1,435 mm) (standard gauge)
- Length: 182 miles (293 km)

Other
- Website: Southwestern Railroad

The Southwestern Railroad (reporting mark SW) is an American Class III railroad operating since 1990, and until 2017 consisted of two unconnected railroad sections in New Mexico, with no shared functions. These and a third section in the Texas panhandle and Oklahoma, now closed, all operated separately. Since January 2017, only the Whitewater Division is operated by Southwestern.

Southwestern is one of several short-line railroads which were operated by The Western Group of Ogden, Utah. On November 1, 2020, Southwestern was sold by Western to Jaguar Transport Holdings of Joplin, Missouri.

== Whitewater Division ==
In 1990 Southwestern acquired AT&SF trackage north and west of Whitewater, New Mexico serving the Phelps Dodge open-pit copper mines at Chino and Tyrone, and the smelter at Hurley. In 1994 an additional 27 miles of line from Whitewater to Peruhill was acquired from the A&TSF, and the Santa Fe’s former Deming Subdivision (60 miles from Rincon to Deming and Peruhill) was acquired from BNSF in 2001. The division’s headquarters are at Deming.

Southwestern's primary traffic on this division is copper-related: ore from the mines to adjacent concentrators, and outbound loads of copper anodes, cathodes, and sulfuric acid (a by-product of the refining process) for transhipment via the BNSF at Rincon or the Union Pacific at Deming. Until 2004 loads of copper ore were transported from the mines to the Hurley smelter, which closed in that year.

BNSF also traverses the Rincon to Deming line under trackage rights.

=== History ===
By late 1880, the Rio Grande, Mexico and Pacific Railroad (an AT&SF subsidiary) was building a line down the Rio Grande valley toward El Paso. At Rincon the line was split, with a branch going southwest toward Deming, with the goal of joining to the Southern Pacific, which was under construction from the west. The two railroads connected at Deming on March 8, 1881, with the driving of a silver spike to mark the creation of the United States’ second transcontinental railroad.

The railroad line northwest from Deming, and its branches above Whitewater, was developed in several stages to serve mines in the vicinity of Silver City:

A 47-mile narrow-gauge railroad, the Silver City, Deming and Pacific Railroad, reached Silver City from Deming in March 1883. Within a year it was acquired by the Santa Fe, which converted the 3-foot gauge line to standard gauge by May 1886.

In 1891 the Silver City and Northern Railroad was built north from Whitewater through Hurley to San Jose (now Hanover Junction), a total of 14 miles. The Santa Fe acquired this line in 1898 and extended it another 4 miles to Santa Rita. The line struggled until 1910 when the Chino Copper Company acquired the copper resources, with sufficient financial backing to develop the open pit Chino mine, and also build the smelter at Hurley.

The 13-mile Burro Mountain Railroad was constructed in 1913, westward from Burro Mountain Junction to the new mining town of Tyrone. Copper prices plummeted after the First World War, making the low-grade ore at this location uneconomical to process, but the railroad struggled on until 1934 when it finally closed and the tracks were removed. Phelps Dodge restarted mining in the late sixties, but this time as an open pit and with new metallurgical techniques for refining. PD rebuilt the old railroad, which opened in 1967, mostly on the old BMRR grade. AT&SF operated this line as an industrial spur.

The Silver City branch north of Burro Mountain Junction was closed in 1983 and the 12.6 miles of track removed.

== Carlsbad Division ==
Established in 2004 from a connection with Burlington Northern Santa Fe in Clovis, New Mexico, the 182 mile BNSF Carlsbad Subdivision was leased by SW until 2017. The line includes an industrial spur running 20 miles east from Carlsbad and a second spur 24 miles east from Loving, New Mexico. Two classification yards are located in Carlsbad, as was SW's headquarters.

Potash from mines near Carlsbad is the main commodity shipped on this division, with approximately 30,000 annual carloads. The spur from Loving also serves the Waste Isolation Pilot Project, an underground repository for nuclear waste.

On January 17, 2017, SWRR's contract to operate the Carlsbad Sub came to an end, with BNSF Railway resuming direct operation of the line.

=== History ===
The Pecos Valley Railway was established in 1890 by J.J. Hagerman to serve the growing irrigated agricultural area in southeastern New Mexico. From Pecos, Texas it reached Eddy (now Carlsbad) in 1891 and Roswell in 1892, but further expansion was delayed by the depression of 1893. As the Pecos Valley and Northeastern Railway, by 1899 it was extended through Portales to Texico, and then (under a different company, as required by Texas law) to Amarillo, Texas. By that time, control had passed to the AT&SF, which soon absorbed the original name. After 1908 the line to Texico was diverted to the new town and division point at Clovis. The line struggled with limited traffic, primarily agricultural and livestock in the early years, until the discovery and development of significant potash deposits east of Carlsbad in the late 1920s. Passenger and postal traffic, which usually only supported daily motorized rail cars, was boosted from 1930 when Carlsbad Caverns was made a National Park, but eventually withered away by 1971.

In 1969, a new 25-mile branch line was extended southwest from Loving to the Duval Corporation sulfur mine at Rustler Springs, Texas. For several years this supported up to four unit trains daily of molten sulfur, routed to Galveston, Texas for export.

The Rustler Springs branch was unused after 1998, following the closure of the sulfur mine. In 2002, BNSF applied to abandon this branch as well as the 21 miles connecting Loving and Pecos, noting that the last revenue train had run on July 23, 1999. Permission was granted and the track removed by 2003.

== Shattuck Division ==
This now-defunct 74-mile-long line in the Texas panhandle and western Oklahoma, AT&SF’s former Shattuck Subdivision, was acquired by Southwestern in 1990. It ran from Shattuck, Oklahoma through Perryton, Texas (where its headquarters were located) to its western terminus at Spearman, Texas. Principal traffic on this division was agricultural. A wildfire near Darrouzett, Texas destroyed a trestle on the line, and the railroad received abandonment authority on the whole line in 2007.

This railroad was originally constructed in 1919 as the North Texas and Santa Fe Railway, a subsidiary of the AT&SF, and was later absorbed into the parent company.
