= Placitas, Doña Ana County, New Mexico =

Placitas, New Mexico
- Census-designated place
- Location within New Mexico
- Coordinates: 32°39′56″N 107°10′11″W
- Country: United States
- State: New Mexico
- County: Doña Ana

Area
  - Total: 0.143 sq mi (0.37 km^{2})
  - Land: 0.143 sq mi (0.37 km^{2})
  - Water: 0 sq mi (0 km^{2})
- Elevation: 4,068 ft (1,240 m)

Population (2010)
  - Total: 576
  - Density: 4,030/sq mi (1,560/km^{2})
- Time zone: UTC-7 (Mountain (MST))
  - Summer (DST): UTC-6 (MDT)
- Area code: 575
- GNIS feature ID: 2584180

Placitas is a census-designated place in Doña Ana County, New Mexico, United States. Its population was 576 as of the 2010 census. The community is along the western border of Hatch.

== Geography ==
According to the U.S. Census Bureau, the community has an area of 0.143 square miles (0.37 km^{2}), all land.

== Education ==
It is zoned to Hatch Valley Public Schools.
