= Cornelius Sullivan House =

- U.S. National Register of Historic Places
- Location within New Mexico
- Location: Jct. of Elenora and First Ave., SW corner, Hillsboro, New Mexico
- Coordinates: 32°55′10″N 107°34′04″W
- Area: less than one acre
- Built: 1893
- Architectural style: New Mexico Vernacular
- MPS: Hillsboro MPS
- NRHP reference No.: 95000459
- Added to NRHP: April 20, 1995

The Cornelius Sullivan House, in Hillsboro, New Mexico, was built in 1893. It was listed on the National Register of Historic Places in 1995.

It is located on the southwest corner of the junction of Elenora and 1st Ave. in Hillsboro.

It is an adobe, one-story, L-shaped, New Mexico Vernacular house.
