= Derry, New Mexico =

Derry
- Unincorporated community
- Location within the state of New Mexico Derry (the United States)
- Coordinates: 32°47′17″N 107°16′56″W
- Country: United States
- State: New Mexico
- County: Sierra
- Elevation: 4,118 ft (1,255 m)
- Time zone: UTC-7 (Mountain (MST))
  - Summer (DST): UTC-6 (MDT)
- Area code: 575
- GNIS feature ID: 888335

Derry is an unincorporated community located in Sierra County, New Mexico, United States. Derry is located on New Mexico State Road 187, 11.3 miles (18.2 km) northwest of Hatch. Derry has a post office with ZIP code 87933, which opened on August 11, 1911. The town was named after Derry, Ireland, which was suggested by a former soldier.

== Education ==
Truth or Consequences Municipal Schools is the school district for the entire county. Truth or Consequences Middle School and Hot Springs High School, both in Truth or Consequences, are the district's secondary schools.
