= Garfield, New Mexico =

- Census-designated place
- Location within New Mexico
- Coordinates: 32°45′25″N 107°15′59″W
- Country: United States
- State: New Mexico
- County: Doña Ana

Area
  - Total: 0.78 sq mi (2.01 km^{2})
  - Land: 0.78 sq mi (2.01 km^{2})
  - Water: 0 sq mi (0.00 km^{2})
- Elevation: 4,105 ft (1,251 m)

Population (2020)
  - Total: 131
  - Density: 168.5/sq mi (65.06/km^{2})
- Time zone: UTC-7 (Mountain (MST))
  - Summer (DST): UTC-6 (MDT)
- ZIP code: 87936
- Area code: 575
- GNIS feature ID: 2584101

Garfield is a census-designated place in Doña Ana County, New Mexico, United States. As of the 2020 census, Garfield had a population of 131. Garfield has a post office with ZIP code 87936, which opened on September 19, 1896. The community is located on New Mexico State Road 187 south of Exit 51 of Interstate 25 .

== Geography ==
According to the U.S. Census Bureau, the community has an area of 0.777 square miles (2.01 km^{2}), all land.

== Demographics ==
Historical population
Census	Pop.	Note	%±
2020	131		—
U.S. Decennial Census

== Education ==
Garfield is within Hatch Valley Public Schools. The district operates Garfield Elementary School.
