= Salem, New Mexico =

- CDP
- Location of Salem, New Mexico

- Location in the United States
- Coordinates: 32°42′44″N 107°12′20″W
- Country: United States
- State: New Mexico
- County: Dona Ana

Area
  - Total: 1.31 sq mi (3.39 km^{2})
  - Land: 1.31 sq mi (3.39 km^{2})
  - Water: 0 sq mi (0.00 km^{2})
- Elevation: 4,150 ft (1,260 m)

Population (2020)
  - Total: 797
  - Density: 609.1/sq mi (235.19/km^{2})
- Time zone: UTC-7 (Mountain (MST))
  - Summer (DST): UTC-6 (MDT)
- ZIP code: 87941
- Area code: 575
- FIPS code: 35-65840
- GNIS feature ID: 2409235

Salem is a census-designated place (CDP) in Doña Ana County, New Mexico, United States. As of the 2020 census, Salem had a population of 797. It is part of the Las Cruces Metropolitan Statistical Area.

== Geography ==
According to the United States Census Bureau, the CDP has a total area of 1.3 square miles (3.4 km^{2}), all land.

== Demographics ==
Historical population
Census	Pop.	Note	%±
2020	797		—
U.S. Decennial Census

As of the census of 2000, there were 795 people, 178 households, and 160 families residing in the CDP. The population density was 615.1 inhabitants per square mile (237.5/km^{2}). There were 199 housing units at an average density of 154.0 per square mile (59.5/km^{2}). The racial makeup of the CDP was 29.43% White, 0.50% African American, 1.38% Native American, 0.25% Asian, 64.53% from other races, and 3.90% from two or more races. Hispanic or Latino of any race were 94.09% of the population.

There were 178 households, out of which 67.4% had children under the age of 18 living with them, 70.8% were married couples living together, 9.0% had a female householder with no husband present, and 10.1% were non-families. 7.3% of all households were made up of individuals, and 5.6% had someone living alone who was 65 years of age or older. The average household size was 4.47 and the average family size was 4.74.

In the CDP, the population was spread out, with 46.9% under the age of 18, 10.9% from 18 to 24, 23.5% from 25 to 44, 13.2% from 45 to 64, and 5.4% who were 65 years of age or older. The median age was 19 years. For every 100 females, there were 116.0 males. For every 100 females age 18 and over, there were 107.9 males.

The median income for a household in the CDP was $14,934, and the median income for a family was $16,591. Males had a median income of $21,705 versus $12,292 for females. The per capita income for the CDP was $7,405. About 49.3% of families and 53.3% of the population were below the poverty line, including 57.9% of those under age 18 and 70.9% of those age 65 or over.

== Education ==
It is zoned to Hatch Valley Public Schools.

== See also ==
- List of census-designated places in New Mexico
