= Radium Springs, New Mexico =

- CDP
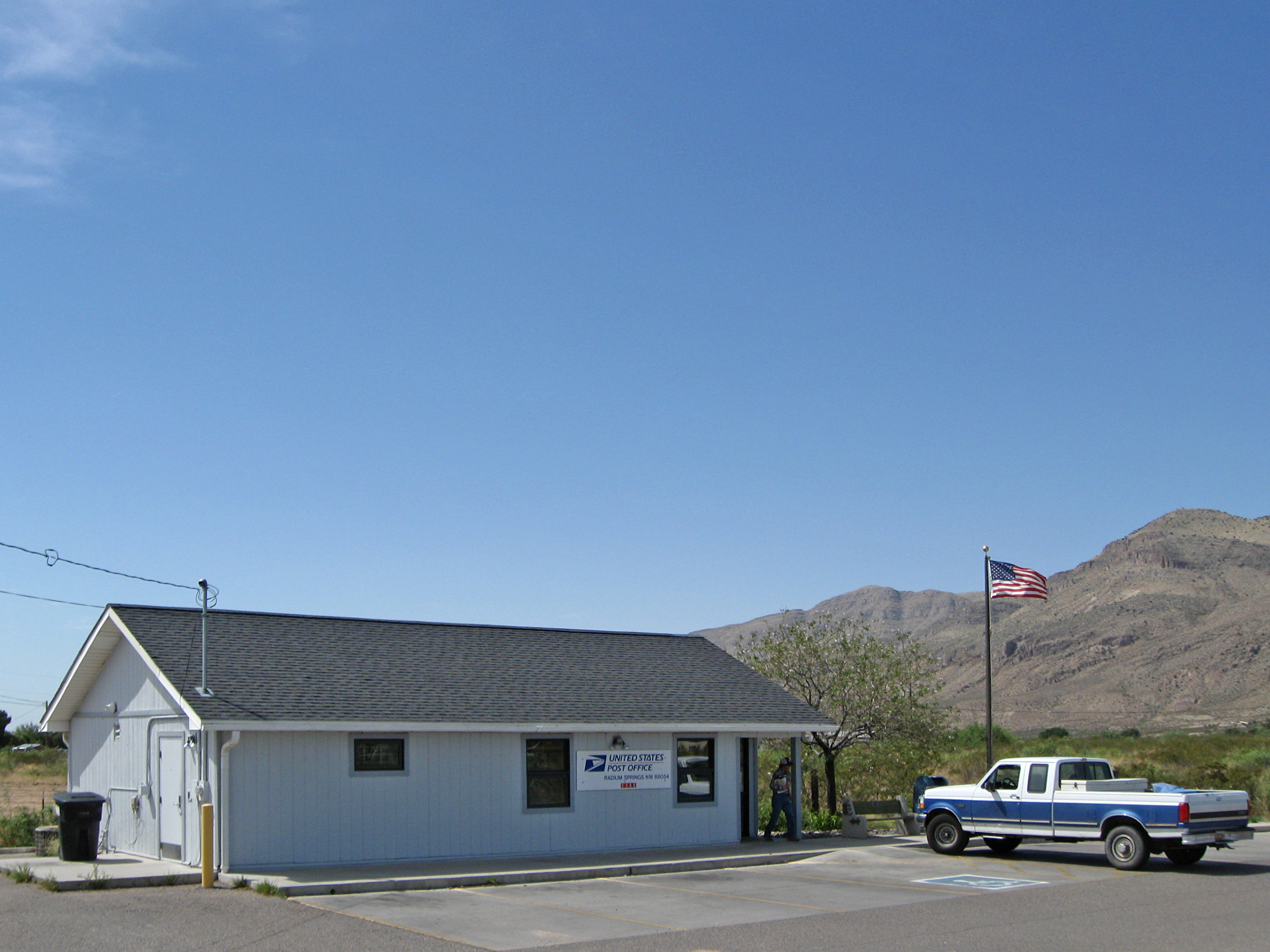
- Radium Springs Post Office

- Location of Radium Springs, New Mexico
- Coordinates: 32°29′24″N 106°54′32″W
- Country: United States
- State: New Mexico
- County: Dona Ana

Area
  - Total: 5.97 sq mi (15.45 km^{2})
  - Land: 5.97 sq mi (15.45 km^{2})
  - Water: 0 sq mi (0.00 km^{2})
- Elevation: 3,960 ft (1,210 m)

Population (2020)
  - Total: 1,498
  - Density: 251.1/sq mi (96.95/km^{2})
- Time zone: UTC-7 (Mountain (MST))
  - Summer (DST): UTC-6 (MDT)
- ZIP code: 88054
- Area code: 575
- FIPS code: 35-61010
- GNIS feature ID: 2409120

Radium Springs is a census-designated place (CDP) in Doña Ana County, New Mexico, United States. As of the 2020 census, Radium Springs had a population of 1,498. It is part of the Las Cruces Metropolitan Statistical Area.

== Geography ==
Radium Springs is at the upstream end of the Mesilla Valley of the Rio Grande. According to the United States Census Bureau, the CDP has a total area of 6.0 square miles (19.6 km^{2}), all land. It is also the location of an old hot springs and the old Fort Selden of the Indian Wars.

== Climate ==
According to the Köppen climate classification system, Radium Springs has a cold semi-arid climate, abbreviated "BSk" on climate maps. The hottest temperature recorded in Radium Springs was 110 °F (43.3 °C) on July 9, 1951, and June 16, 1980, while the coldest temperature recorded was −20 °F (−28.9 °C) on January 29, 1948, and February 3, 2011.

Climate data for Jornada Experimental Range, 1991–2020 normals, extremes 1914–present
Month	Jan	Feb	Mar	Apr	May	Jun	Jul	Aug	Sep	Oct	Nov	Dec	Year
Record high °F (°C)	80 (27)	85 (29)	92 (33)	96 (36)	104 (40)	110 (43)	110 (43)	107 (42)	102 (39)	99 (37)	88 (31)	77 (25)	110 (43)
Mean maximum °F (°C)	68.6 (20.3)	74.8 (23.8)	82.2 (27.9)	87.9 (31.1)	96.1 (35.6)	103.0 (39.4)	103.3 (39.6)	99.4 (37.4)	96.0 (35.6)	90.3 (32.4)	78.3 (25.7)	69.1 (20.6)	104.7 (40.4)
Mean daily maximum °F (°C)	57.6 (14.2)	63.2 (17.3)	70.4 (21.3)	78.0 (25.6)	86.4 (30.2)	95.8 (35.4)	95.5 (35.3)	93.2 (34.0)	87.9 (31.1)	78.8 (26.0)	66.6 (19.2)	56.9 (13.8)	77.5 (25.3)
Daily mean °F (°C)	39.5 (4.2)	44.4 (6.9)	50.9 (10.5)	58.0 (14.4)	66.8 (19.3)	76.5 (24.7)	80.3 (26.8)	78.2 (25.7)	71.6 (22.0)	60.3 (15.7)	48.0 (8.9)	39.5 (4.2)	59.5 (15.3)
Mean daily minimum °F (°C)	21.4 (−5.9)	25.7 (−3.5)	31.5 (−0.3)	37.9 (3.3)	47.2 (8.4)	57.3 (14.1)	65.0 (18.3)	63.1 (17.3)	55.3 (12.9)	41.7 (5.4)	29.4 (−1.4)	22.0 (−5.6)	41.5 (5.3)
Mean minimum °F (°C)	9.5 (−12.5)	12.4 (−10.9)	17.7 (−7.9)	24.5 (−4.2)	32.4 (0.2)	44.2 (6.8)	55.0 (12.8)	54.4 (12.4)	43.0 (6.1)	26.6 (−3.0)	14.3 (−9.8)	9.0 (−12.8)	5.4 (−14.8)
Record low °F (°C)	−20 (−29)	−20 (−29)	2 (−17)	13 (−11)	21 (−6)	27 (−3)	45 (7)	36 (2)	30 (−1)	10 (−12)	−3 (−19)	−12 (−24)	−20 (−29)
Average precipitation inches (mm)	0.52 (13)	0.46 (12)	0.24 (6.1)	0.27 (6.9)	0.47 (12)	0.67 (17)	2.24 (57)	2.03 (52)	1.44 (37)	0.90 (23)	0.53 (13)	0.67 (17)	10.44 (266)
Average snowfall inches (cm)	0.5 (1.3)	0.2 (0.51)	0.0 (0.0)	0.0 (0.0)	0.0 (0.0)	0.0 (0.0)	0.0 (0.0)	0.0 (0.0)	0.0 (0.0)	0.3 (0.76)	0.0 (0.0)	0.3 (0.76)	1.3 (3.33)
Average precipitation days (≥ 0.01 in)	2.5	2.1	1.9	1.1	2.0	2.6	6.8	7.1	4.5	3.1	1.8	2.8	38.3
Average snowy days (≥ 0.1 in)	0.2	0.1	0.0	0.0	0.0	0.0	0.0	0.0	0.0	0.1	0.0	0.2	0.6
Source 1: NOAA
Source 2: National Weather Service

== Demographics ==
Historical population
Census	Pop.	Note	%±
2020	1,498		—
U.S. Decennial Census

As of the census of 2010, there were 1,699 people living in the CDP. The population density was 283 inhabitants per square mile (109/km^{2}). There were 689 housing units at an average density of 115 per square mile (44/km^{2}). The racial makeup of the CDP was 85.5% White, 0.5% African American, 0.9% Native American, 0.4% Asian, 10.9% from other races, and 1.7% from two or more races. Hispanic or Latino of any race were 52.8% of the population.

There were 635 households, out of which 32.0% had children under the age of 18 living with them, 57.3% were married couples living together, 12.0% had a female householder with no husband present, and 24.6% were non-families. 19.5% of all households were made up of individuals, and 5.7% had someone living alone who was 65 years of age or older. The average household size was 2.68, and the average family size was 3.06.

In the CDP, the population's age was spread out, with 22.4% under the age of 15, 10.6% from 15 to 24, 21.99% from 25 to 44, 32.4% from 45 to 64, and 12.9% who were 65 years of age or older. The median age was 41 years. For every 100 females, there were 94.8 males. For every 100 females age 16 and over, there were 94.5 males.

The median income for a household in the CDP was $53,188, and the median income for a family was $66,250. Male full-time workers had a median income of $36,753, versus $30,829 for females. The per capita income for the CDP was $20,497.

== Education ==
It is located in Las Cruces Public Schools.
