= Rincon, New Mexico =

- CDP
- Location of Rincon, New Mexico

- Location in the United States
- Coordinates: 32°40′21″N 107°04′33″W
- Country: United States
- State: New Mexico
- County: Dona Ana

Area
  - Total: 1.05 sq mi (2.73 km^{2})
  - Land: 1.05 sq mi (2.73 km^{2})
  - Water: 0 sq mi (0.00 km^{2})
- Elevation: 4,101 ft (1,250 m)

Population (2020)
  - Total: 273
  - Density: 258.9/sq mi (99.95/km^{2})
- Time zone: UTC-7 (Mountain (MST))
  - Summer (DST): UTC-6 (MDT)
- ZIP code: 87940
- Area code: 575
- FIPS code: 35-62900
- GNIS feature ID: 2409169

Rincon is a census-designated place (CDP) in Doña Ana County, New Mexico, United States. As of the 2020 census, Rincon had a population of 273. It is part of the Las Cruces Metropolitan Statistical Area.

== Geography ==
Rincon is located adjacent to Hatch, in the valley of the Rio Grande.

According to the United States Census Bureau, the CDP has a total area of 1.0 square mile (2.6 km^{2}), all land.

== Demographics ==
Historical population
Census	Pop.	Note	%±
2020	273		—
U.S. Decennial Census

As of the census of 2000, there were 220 people, 60 households, and 55 families residing in the CDP. The population density was 213.6 inhabitants per square mile (82.5/km^{2}). There were 65 housing units at an average density of 63.1 per square mile (24.4/km^{2}). The racial makeup of the CDP was 45.00% White, 2.73% Native American, 51.82% from other races, and 0.45% from two or more races. Hispanic or Latino of any race were 87.27% of the population.

There were 60 households, out of which 48.3% had children under the age of 18 living with them, 71.7% were married couples living together, 13.3% had a female householder with no husband present, and 8.3% were non-families. 8.3% of all households were made up of individuals, and 6.7% had someone living alone who was 65 years of age or older. The average household size was 3.67 and the average family size was 3.76.

In the CDP, the population was spread out, with 37.3% under the age of 18, 9.1% from 18 to 24, 22.7% from 25 to 44, 20.9% from 45 to 64, and 10.0% who were 65 years of age or older. The median age was 31 years. For every 100 females, there were 86.4 males. For every 100 females age 18 and over, there were 97.1 males.

The median income for a household in the CDP was $18,929, and the median income for a family was $18,068. Males had a median income of $15,972 versus $11,250 for females. The per capita income for the CDP was $7,572. About 18.9% of families and 31.7% of the population were below the poverty line, including 35.7% of those under the age of eighteen and 42.9% of those 65 or over.

== Economy ==
Rincon is 33 miles north of Las Cruces, New Mexico, on Interstate 25, and approximately 20 miles south of Spaceport America, a new purpose-built spaceport being built by the New Mexico Spaceport Authority with State and county funding. Spaceport construction has generated some 800 temporary jobs on the site, but some Rincon residents have been skeptical that the spaceport will generate as many jobs in the long term as supporters claimed in the runup to public funding. As of January 2012, one company, Virgin Galactic, plans to employ about 150 persons at the spaceport site.

== Education ==
It is zoned to Hatch Valley Public Schools.
