= Hatch, New Mexico =

- Village
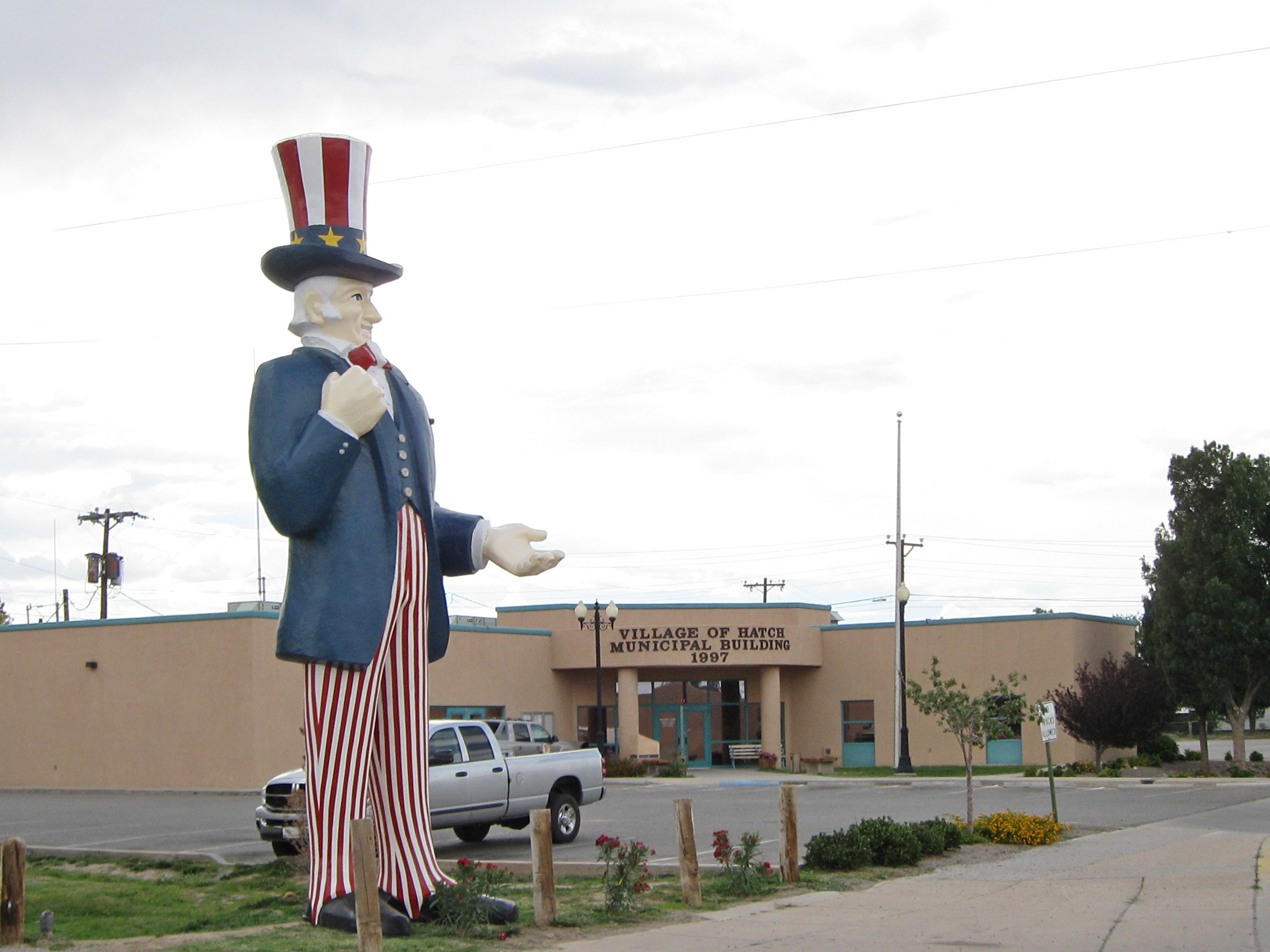
- Hatch Municipal Building, June 2009

- Location within Doña Ana County and New Mexico

- Location in the United States
- Coordinates: 32°38′54″N 107°12′31″W
- Country: United States
- State: New Mexico
- County: Doña Ana

Area
  - Total: 3.07 sq mi (7.94 km^{2})
  - Land: 3.00 sq mi (7.78 km^{2})
  - Water: 0.062 sq mi (0.16 km^{2})
- Elevation: 4,062 ft (1,238 m)

Population (2020)
  - Total: 1,539
  - Density: 512.2/sq mi (197.75/km^{2})
- Time zone: UTC-7 (Mountain (MST))
  - Summer (DST): UTC-6 (MDT)
- ZIP code: 87937
- Area code: Area code 575
- FIPS code: 35-31820
- GNIS ID: 2413557
- Website: villageofhatch.org

Hatch is a village in Doña Ana County, New Mexico, United States. As of the 2020 census, Hatch had a population of 1,539. Hatch is part of the Las Cruces metropolitan statistical area. The village is experiencing moderate growth, along with its outliers of Salem, Arrey, Derry, and Rincon. Hatch is widely known as the "best chile place in the World," for growing a wide variety of peppers, especially the New Mexican cuisine staple, and one of New Mexico's state vegetables, the New Mexico chile.

== History ==
Hatch was originally established as Santa Barbara by New Mexican farmers in 1851 along the road between the Jornada del Muerto and Cooke's Wagon Road, northwest of the San Diego Crossing, until Apache raids drove them away. In 1853, Fort Thorn was constructed to protect the area from similar raids, and the settlement was re-established. The fort closed in 1859, and the town was abandoned again in 1860 in the face of resumed raiding. In 1875, the area was reoccupied, this time named "Hatch" for Edward Hatch, who was then of the military District of New Mexico.

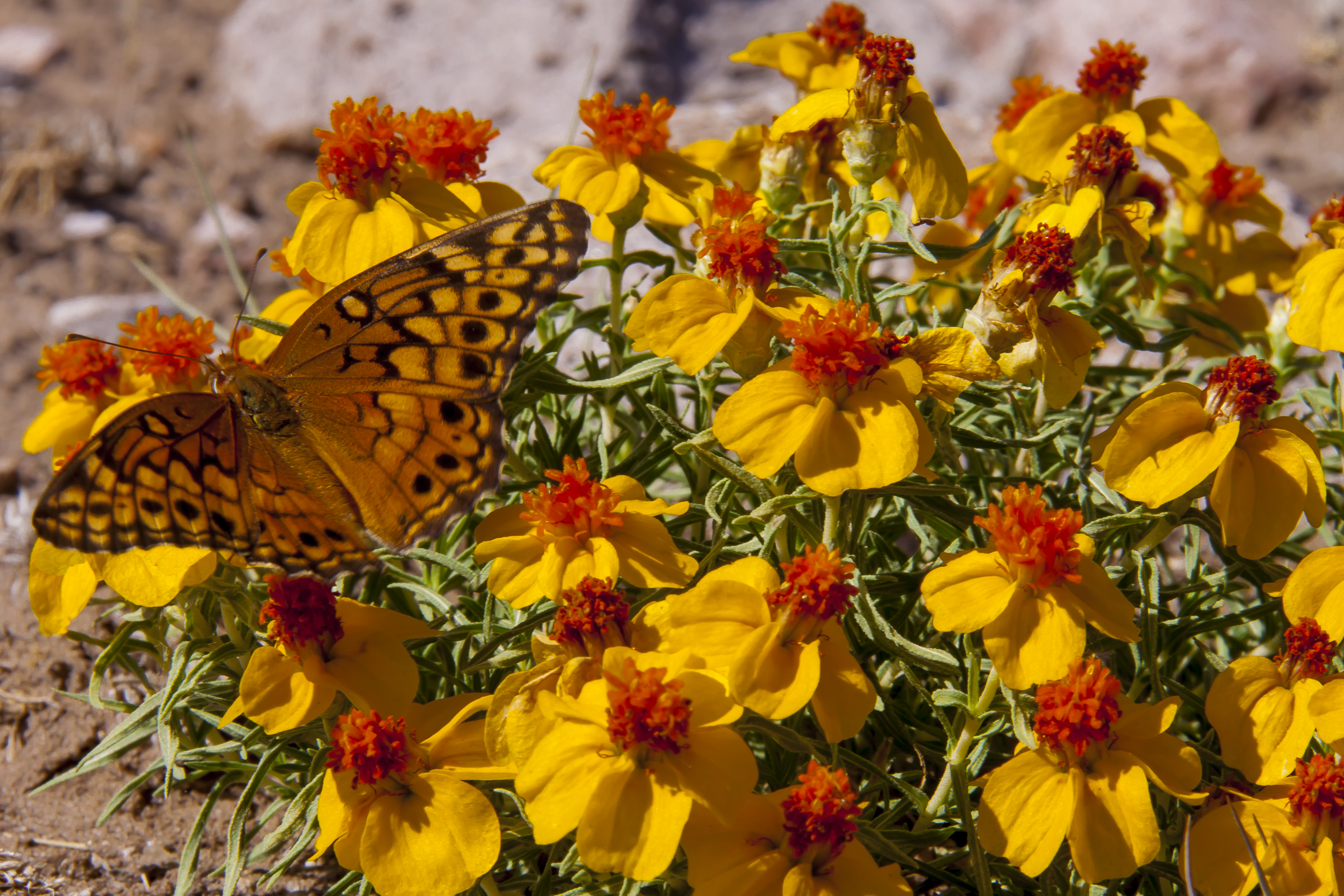
Butterfly on desert zinnia, BLM Las Uvas Mountains Wilderness Study Area, 4 miles (6.4 km) south of Hatch

== Geography ==
According to the United States Census Bureau, the village has a total area of 3.1 square miles (8.0 km^{2}), all land.

The village is located just off Interstate 25, about 40 miles (64 km) northwest of Las Cruces, and around 80 miles (130 km) northwest of El Paso, Texas.

== Demographics ==
Historical population
Census	Pop.	Note	%±
1930	364		—
1940	822		125.8%
1950	1,064		29.4%
1960	888		−16.5%
1970	867		−2.4%
1980	1,028		18.6%
1990	1,136		10.5%
2000	1,673		47.3%
2010	1,648		−1.5%
2020	1,539		−6.6%
U.S. Decennial Census

As of the 2000 census, 1,673 people, 538 households, and 402 families resided in the village. The population density was 540.2 inhabitants per square mile (208.6/km^{2}). The 635 housing units had an average density of 205.0 per square mile (79.2/km^{2}). The racial makeup of the village was 46.03% White, 0.36% African American, 0.96% Native American, 0.24% Pacific Islander, 50.03% from other races, and 2.39% from two or more races. Hispanics or Latinos of any race were 79.20% of the population.

Of the 538 households, 43.7% had children under 18 living with them, 56.7% were married couples living together, 14.3% had a female householder with no husband present, and 25.1% were not families. About 20.6% of all households were made up of individuals, and 11.0% had someone living alone who was 65 or older. The average household size was 3.11, and the average family size was 3.63. In the village, the age distribution was 35.7% under 18, 9.7% from 18 to 24, 24.3% from 25 to 44, 17.9% from 45 to 64, and 12.3% who were 65 or older. The median age was 30 years. For every 100 females, there were 94.5 males. For every 100 females 18 and over, there were 93.9 males.

The median income in the village for a household was $21,250 and for a family was $23,819. Males had a median income of $21,923 versus $17,188 for females. The per capita income for the village was $14,619. About 28.5% of families and 34.5% of the population were below the poverty line, including 50.1% of those under 18 and 14.6% of those 65 or over.

== Economy ==
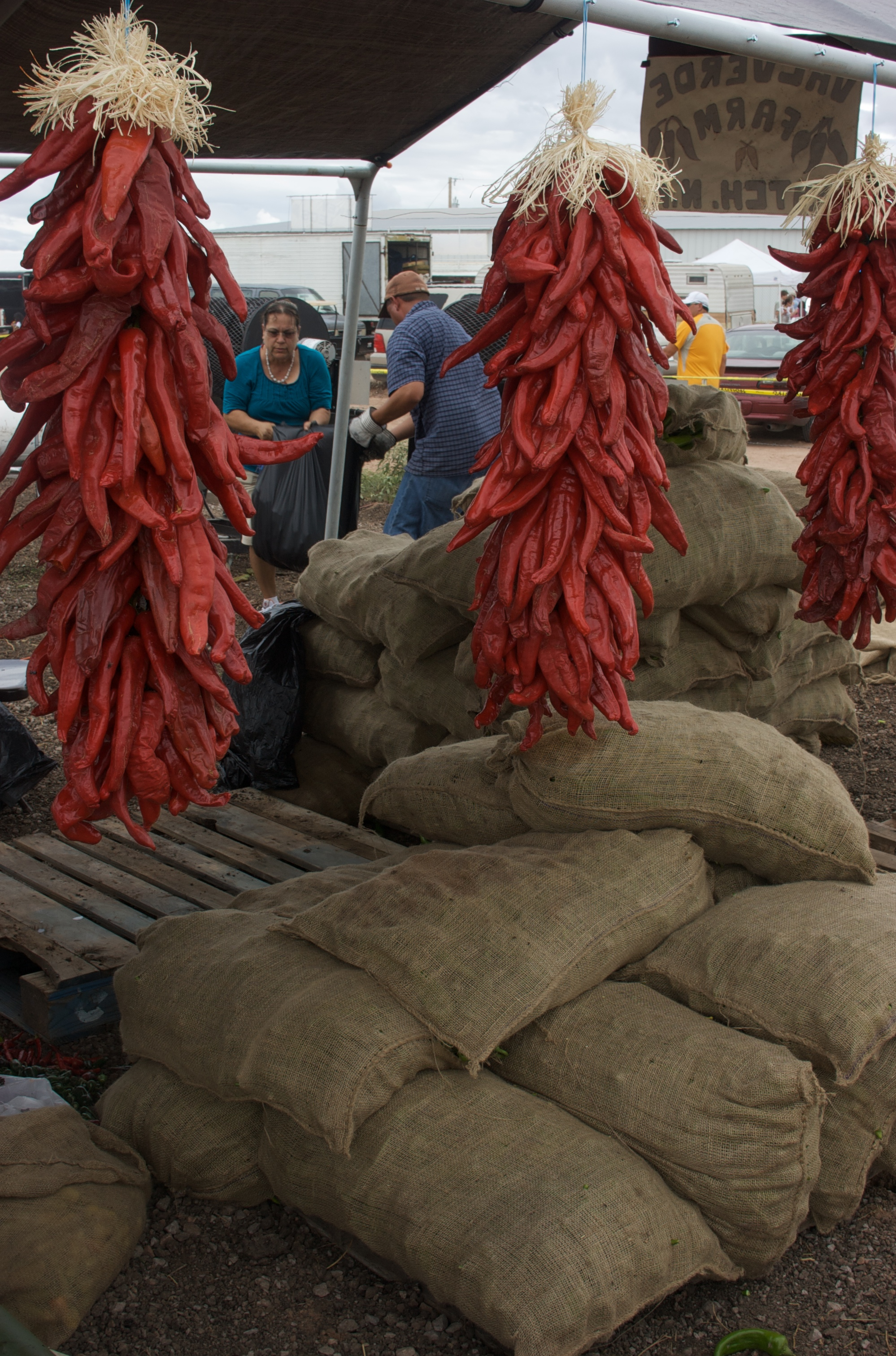
Ristras and sacks of chiles at the annual Hatch Chile Festival, August 2008

This small farming community is known worldwide for raising renowned chiles. The annual Hatch Chile Festival occurs each Labor Day. This event attracts people worldwide to a place known as the chile capital of the world. Hatch has accommodated up to 30,000 people for this event. By 2012, Hatch chiles were being marketed under their name in most major urban markets in the US. Other crops such as onions, cotton, and corn are also raised there. Irrigation of local farms is accomplished by wells pumping ground water along with surface water irrigation ditches. These divert water from the Rio Grande and two lakes about 20 mi (32 km) north of Hatch: Caballo (Spanish for "horse") and Elephant Butte Reservoir (named after a rock formation in the middle of the lake that looks similar to an elephant).

Hatch is 40 mi (64 km) northwest of Las Cruces, New Mexico, on Interstate 25, and 34 mi (55 km) south of Spaceport America, a new purpose-built spaceport being built by the New Mexico Spaceport Authority (NMSA) with state and county funding. In 2012, the NMSA announced it would be building a spaceport visitor center in Hatch.

== Education ==
Hatch Valley Public Schools provide the local public-school education.

== Transportation ==
Hatch is served by South Central Regional Transit District, with services to Las Cruces to the south and Truth or Consequences to the north.

The Southwestern Railroad passes through Hatch.

== See also ==
- List of municipalities in New Mexico
