= Hillsboro, New Mexico =

- Unincorporated community & CDP
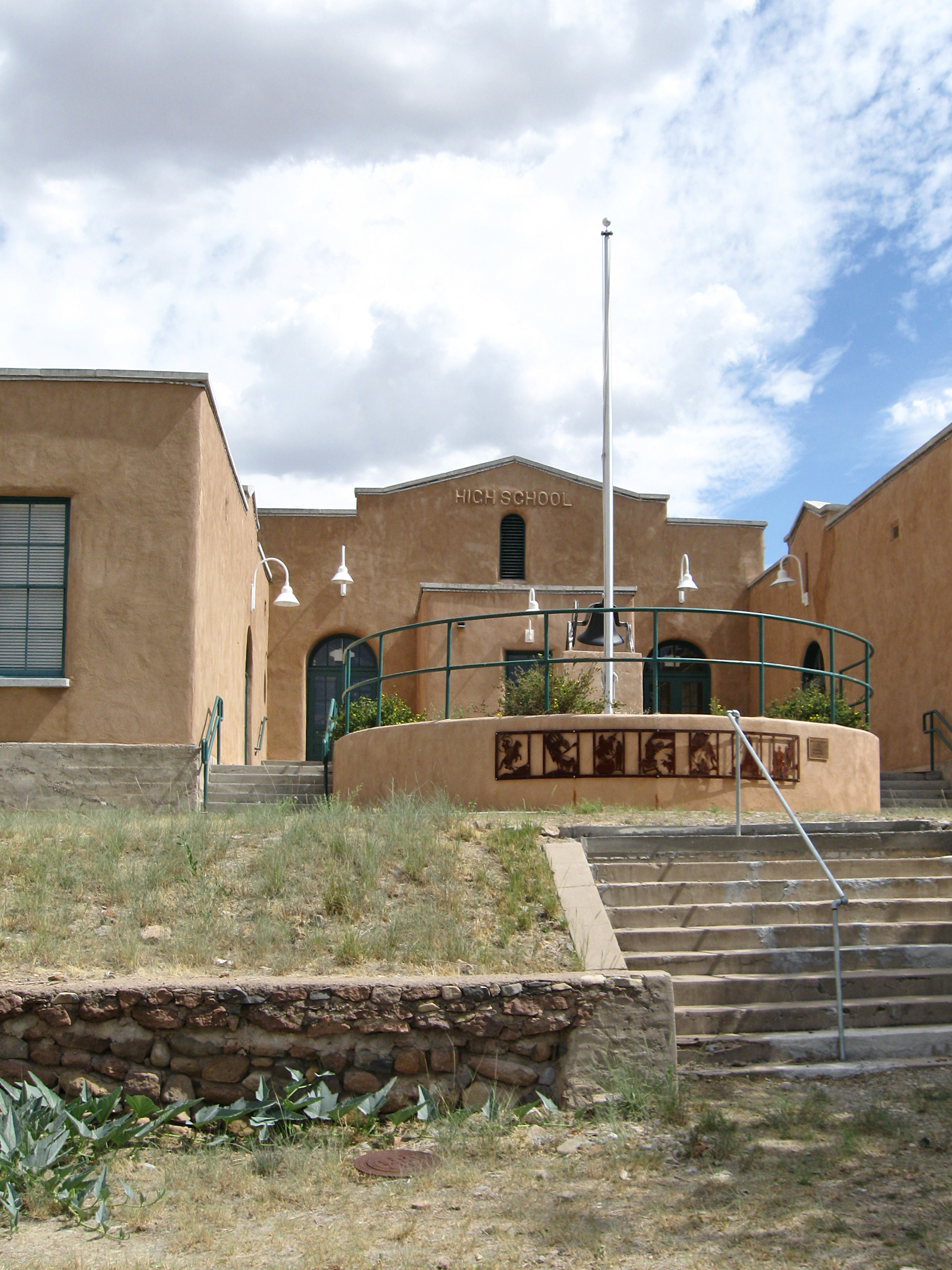
- Hillsboro New Mexico Community Center

- Location in the New Mexico
- Coordinates: 32°55′19″N 107°34′38″W
- Country: United States
- State: New Mexico
- County: Sierra

Area
  - Total: 2.13 sq mi (5.5 km^{2})
- Elevation: 5,364 ft (1,635 m)

Population (2010)
  - Total: 124
  - Density: 58.2/sq mi (22.5/km^{2})
- Time zone: Mountain
  - Summer (DST): Mountain
- ZIP code: 88042
- Area code: 575
- FIPS code: 35-32380
- GNIS feature ID: 2584112

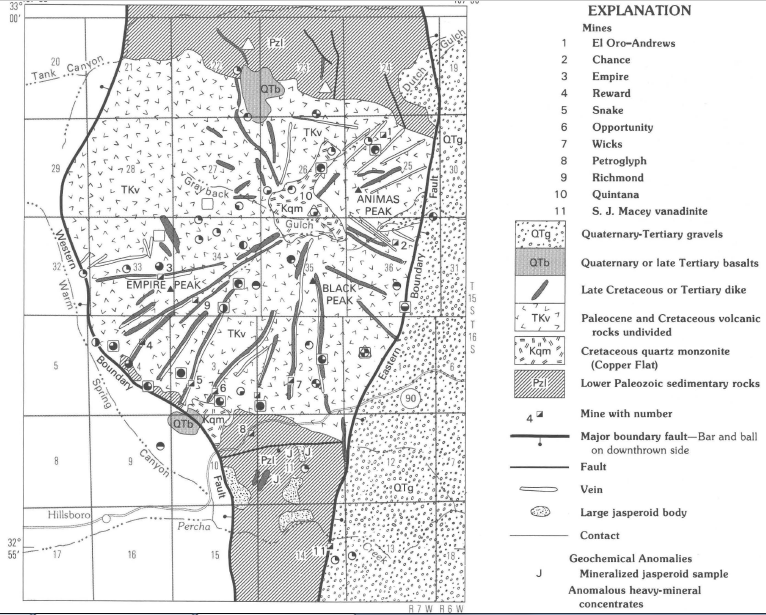
Hillsboro New Mexico geological map showing mine locations.

Hillsboro is an unincorporated community in Sierra County, New Mexico, United States, located in the southwestern part of the state. It was founded in 1877, following the discovery of gold. The community was the county seat of Sierra County from 1884 until 1936, when Hot Springs (now called Truth or Consequences) became the county seat.

As of the 2020 census, Hillsboro had a population of 140.

The town was named Hillsborough by prospectors in December 1877, but later shortened to Hillsboro. By 1880, the town had four companies of soldiers and 400 miners, but the population soon grew to 700. A county courthouse was built in 1892. By 1907, the population was 1200. A flood on 10 June 1914 caused considerable damage to many town buildings. New Mexico State Road 152 and NM 27 intersect in and bisect the town.

== Geology ==
The first house was built in August 1877 after two prospectors, Dan Dugan and Dave Stitzel, working in the area of the future Opportunity Mine, collected loose pieces of rock (float is the geologic term) assayed at $160 per ton in gold and silver. Soon, ore was discovered at the nearby Rattlesnake vein (geology) by Dugan and Frank Pitcher, and a placer deposit of gold was found in November at the Rattlesnake and Wicks gulches. Ore was pulverized with arrastres located in Hillsboro, including a 10-stamp mill built in 1878. Total production prior to 1904 was about $6,750,000. Between 1911 and 1931, total production of gold ore was 836 tons, gold-copper-silver ore was 5,470 tons, and copper ore was 200 tons. In his report, Harley wrote, "The ore deposits of the Hillsboro or Las Animas mining district are of four general types as follows: (1) fissure veins in andesite flows, (2) disseminated deposits in monzonite porphyry, (3) replacement deposits in limestone, and (4) placer gold deposits."

The Copper Flat volcano to the northeast of Hillsboro is the source of the gold in the area. The 4 mile wide volcano is characterized by a Cretaceous quartz monzonite stock within a topographic depression, surrounded by surface andesite flows at least 2,300 feet thick, and radial quartz latite or rhyolite dikes. The stock generated the porphyry copper deposits, gold-bearing veins, and gold placers. There are about 26 major veins forming a radial pattern from the stock. The Golddust Camp placer deposits are found in the alluvium of the dry gulches radiating off Copper Flat and the andesite flows. The fissure veins produced 51,000 ounces of gold, while the placer deposits produced 110,000 ounces.

The Sternberg Mine at Copper Flat produced 200 tons of copper ore between 1911 and 1934. By 1959, Bear Creek Mining Company had discovered a mineralized breccia pipe within the stock. Quintana Minerals Corporation started open-pit mining in 1980, averaging 0.45 per cent copper. Ore minerals include pyrite, chalcopyrite, sphalerite and galena.

== Climate ==
According to the Köppen Climate Classification system, Hillsboro has a cold semi-arid climate, abbreviated "BSk" on climate maps. The hottest temperature recorded in Hillsboro was 107 °F (41.7 °C) on June 15–16, 1896, June 22, 1981, and June 26, 1994, while the coldest temperature recorded was −14 °F (−25.6 °C) on January 11, 1962.

Climate data for Hillsboro, New Mexico, 1991–2020 normals, extremes 1893–present
Month	Jan	Feb	Mar	Apr	May	Jun	Jul	Aug	Sep	Oct	Nov	Dec	Year
Record high °F (°C)	81 (27)	84 (29)	87 (31)	94 (34)	104 (40)	107 (42)	105 (41)	104 (40)	102 (39)	94 (34)	84 (29)	83 (28)	107 (42)
Mean maximum °F (°C)	67.9 (19.9)	73.6 (23.1)	80.7 (27.1)	86.1 (30.1)	94.1 (34.5)	101.4 (38.6)	100.6 (38.1)	96.9 (36.1)	93.3 (34.1)	86.9 (30.5)	77.1 (25.1)	68.6 (20.3)	102.8 (39.3)
Mean daily maximum °F (°C)	54.8 (12.7)	59.9 (15.5)	67.3 (19.6)	74.9 (23.8)	83.3 (28.5)	92.5 (33.6)	91.8 (33.2)	89.2 (31.8)	84.0 (28.9)	75.1 (23.9)	63.4 (17.4)	53.7 (12.1)	74.2 (23.4)
Daily mean °F (°C)	39.9 (4.4)	44.0 (6.7)	50.6 (10.3)	57.6 (14.2)	65.5 (18.6)	74.4 (23.6)	76.7 (24.8)	74.6 (23.7)	68.5 (20.3)	58.4 (14.7)	47.2 (8.4)	39.3 (4.1)	58.1 (14.5)
Mean daily minimum °F (°C)	25.0 (−3.9)	28.1 (−2.2)	34.0 (1.1)	40.3 (4.6)	47.7 (8.7)	56.3 (13.5)	61.7 (16.5)	60.0 (15.6)	53.0 (11.7)	41.8 (5.4)	31.3 (−0.4)	24.8 (−4.0)	42.0 (5.6)
Mean minimum °F (°C)	12.5 (−10.8)	15.4 (−9.2)	20.1 (−6.6)	27.0 (−2.8)	35.2 (1.8)	46.4 (8.0)	54.6 (12.6)	53.7 (12.1)	43.1 (6.2)	27.8 (−2.3)	17.0 (−8.3)	11.6 (−11.3)	9.4 (−12.6)
Record low °F (°C)	−14 (−26)	−10 (−23)	8 (−13)	17 (−8)	27 (−3)	39 (4)	46 (8)	47 (8)	35 (2)	15 (−9)	5 (−15)	−5 (−21)	−14 (−26)
Average precipitation inches (mm)	0.64 (16)	0.42 (11)	0.30 (7.6)	0.35 (8.9)	0.68 (17)	0.83 (21)	2.08 (53)	2.41 (61)	1.97 (50)	0.99 (25)	0.74 (19)	0.87 (22)	12.28 (311.5)
Average snowfall inches (cm)	1.2 (3.0)	0.3 (0.76)	0.0 (0.0)	0.0 (0.0)	0.0 (0.0)	0.0 (0.0)	0.0 (0.0)	0.0 (0.0)	0.0 (0.0)	0.3 (0.76)	0.3 (0.76)	0.6 (1.5)	2.7 (6.78)
Average precipitation days (≥ 0.01 in)	2.8	2.3	2.0	1.7	3.0	4.0	10.1	9.7	6.6	4.1	2.7	3.5	52.5
Average snowy days (≥ 0.1 in)	0.4	0.2	0.0	0.0	0.0	0.0	0.0	0.0	0.0	0.0	0.1	0.4	1.1
Source 1: NOAA
Source 2: National Weather Service

== Education ==
Truth or Consequences Municipal Schools is the school district for the entire county. Truth or Consequences Middle School and Hot Springs High School, both in Truth or Consequences, are the district's secondary schools.

== Notable people ==
- Physician and American Civil War veteran C.C. Crews
- Future justice of the New Mexico Supreme Court Frank W. Parker. He presided over the 1899 murder trial of Albert J. Fountain.

== See also ==
- Kingston, New Mexico
- Fissure vein
