= Geronimo Trail Scenic Byway =

Scenic road in New Mexico, USA

Geronimo Trail Scenic Byway

Route information
- Maintained by NMDOT
- Length: 154.0 mi (247.8 km)
- Component highways: NM 152 from San Lorenzo to Caballo; NM 187 to Williamsburg; I-25 BL to Truth or Consequences; NM 51 to Elephant Butte Dam; NM 179 to Elephant Butte Lake State Park; NM 195 to NM 181; NM 181 to NM 52; NM 52 from NM 181 to NM 59; NM 59 to Beaverhead Ranger Station

Major junctions
- South end: NM 35 in San Lorenzo, NM
- NM 152 / NM 27 in Hillsboro; NM 152 / I-25 near Caballo; I-25 BL / NM 51 in Truth or Consequences; I-25 / NM 181 / NM 195 in Elephant Butte
- North end: NM 61 in Beaverhead, NM

Location
- Country: United States
- State: New Mexico
- Counties: Sierra, Grant

Highway system
- Scenic Byways; National; National Forest; BLM; NPS; New Mexico State Highway System; Interstate; US; State; Scenic

Geronimo Trail Scenic Byway is a US National Scenic Byway commemorating Chiricahua Apache warrior Geronimo. The road is also recognized by the New Mexico Department of Transportation as a scenic and historic byway. The town of Truth or Consequences, New Mexico lies at the center of this trail with a southern end at San Lorenzo, Grant County, New Mexico and a northern end at Beaverhead Ranger Station. The Federal Highway Administration gives the total length of this scenic road as 154.0 mi (247.8 km).

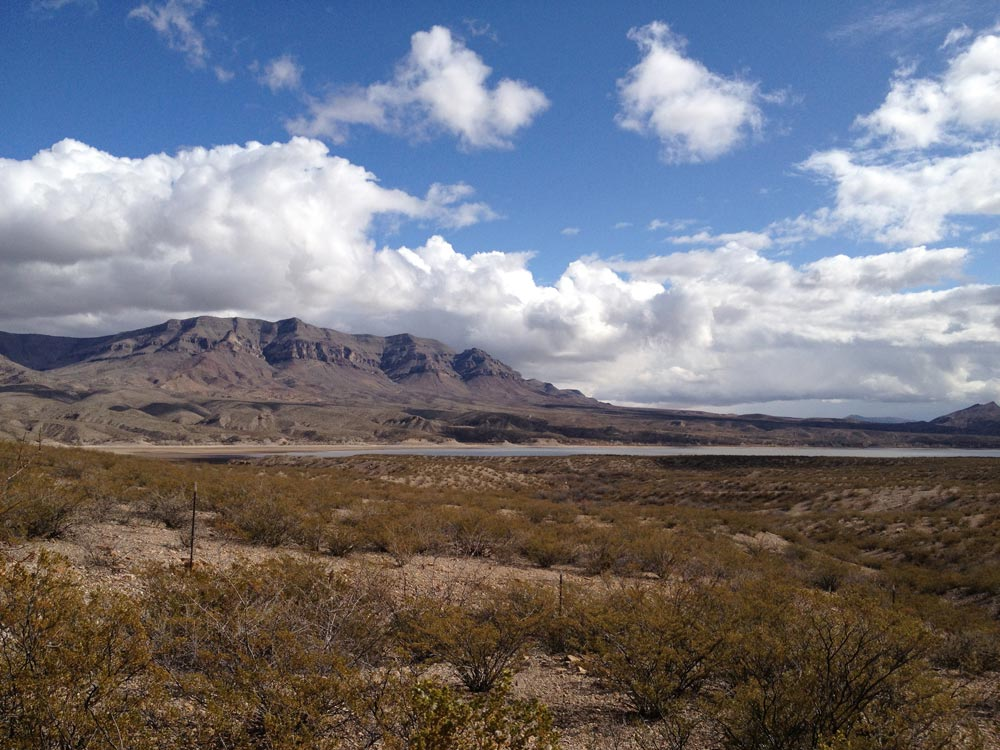
Caballo Lake and Caballo Mountains as seen from the trail

Geronimo Trail incorporates several New Mexico state highways passing along Elephant Butte Dam, Elephant Butte Lake State Park, Caballo Lake, Caballo Mountains and Black Range Mountains. It is connected to the Trail of the Mountain Spirits Scenic Byway in the southwest and El Camino Real De Tierra Adentro in the northeast. Towns along its southern route starting from San Lorenzo include Kingston, Hillsboro, Caballo, Williamsburg, and the ghost town of Lake Valley which is located 18 mi (29 km) south of the trail from Hillsboro on NM 27. From Truth or Consequences north, there are Elephant Butte, New Mexico, Cuchillo, Winston and Chloride.
