= Elephant Butte =

Elephant Butte may refer to:

== Summits ==
- Elephant Butte (Monument Valley), Arizona
- Elephant Butte (Hidalgo County, New Mexico)
- Elephant Butte (Sierra County, New Mexico), a volcanic neck surrounded by a lake
- Elephant Butte (Montana), a mountain in Garfield County
- Elephant Butte (Arches National Park), highest point in Arches National Park
- Elephant Butte (Washington), a mountain in Whatcom County

== Other places ==
- Elephant Butte Reservoir, New Mexico
- Elephant Butte Dam, a dam
- Elephant Butte Lake State Park, a state park
- Elephant Butte, New Mexico, a city
- Elephant Butte, Sierra County, New Mexico, a populated place

== See also ==
- White Elephant Butte
