= New Mexico State Road 195 =

State highway in New Mexico, United States

State Road 195
- NM 195 highlighted in red

Route information
- Maintained by NMDOT
- Length: 6.55 mi (10.54 km)

Major junctions
- South end: NM 177 near Truth or Consequences
- North end: I-25 / US 85 / NM 181 near Truth or Consequences

Location
- Country: United States
- State: New Mexico
- Counties: Sierra

Highway system
- New Mexico State Highway System; Interstate; US; State; Scenic
← NM 194	→ NM 196

State Road 195 (NM 195) is a 6.55-mile-long (10.54 km) state highway in the US state of New Mexico. NM 195's southern terminus is at NM 177 east-northeast of Truth or Consequences, and the northern terminus is at Interstate 25 (I-25), U.S. Route 85 (US 85) and NM 181 north of Truth or Consequences. It currently exists in two segments because the bridge over the Elephant Butte Dam was closed in 2001 to traffic.

== Route description ==
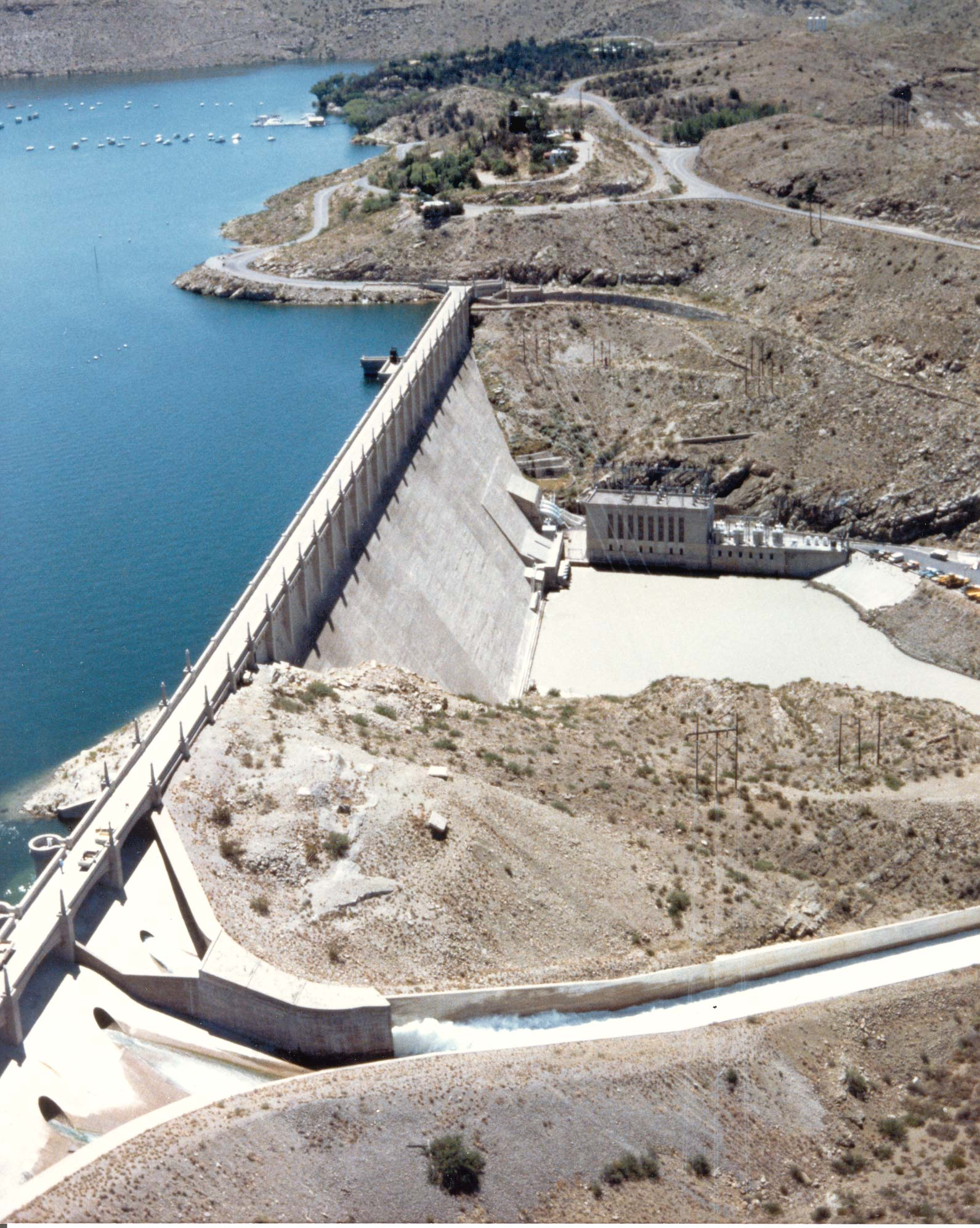
NM 195 as it crosses the Elephant Butte Dam, now closed to traffic

NM 195 begins at a junction with NM 177. It travels northwest and travels over the Elephant Butte Dam before an intersection with NM 179 and the entrance to the Elephant Butte Lake State Park before entering the city of Elephant Butte. It continues traveling northwest through the city intersecting NM 171 and Rock Canyon Road before terminating at a junction with NM 181 and the northbound on-off ramp of I-25 and US 85.

== History ==
The western part of NM 195 has been a state route since the 1920s, when it was part of US 85. By the early 1940s, US 85 was realigned to a more westerly route. The old route became part of NM 52. In the 1988 renumbering the current route of NM 195 was created when NM 52 was broken up into smaller segments. At some point the bridge over Elephant Butte Dam became one-way eastbound, causing westbound traffic to take NM 51 and NM 177 to join this route east of the city of Elephant Butte. The bridge over Elephant Butte Dam was closed in 2001. On October 16, 2014, a portion of NM 195 was given to the city of Elephant Butte.

== Major intersections ==
The entire route is in Sierra County.

Location	mi	km	Destinations	Notes
	0.000	0.000	I-25 / US 85 / NM 181	Northern terminus, I-25 Exit 83
Elephant Butte	3.255	5.238	Warm Springs Boulevard	Eastern terminus of former NM 171
	4.355	7.009	NM 179 south	Northern terminus of NM 179
	6.550	10.541	NM 177	Southern terminus
1.000 mi = 1.609 km; 1.000 km = 0.621 mi

== See also ==
- List of state roads in New Mexico
