= Oasis, New Mexico =

- Census-designated place
- Location within New Mexico
- Coordinates: 32°55′40″N 107°18′59″W
- Country: United States
- State: New Mexico
- County: Sierra

Area
  - Total: 2.09 sq mi (5.41 km^{2})
  - Land: 2.09 sq mi (5.41 km^{2})
  - Water: 0 sq mi (0.00 km^{2})
- Elevation: 4,252 ft (1,296 m)

Population (2020)
  - Total: 161
  - Density: 77.1/sq mi (29.75/km^{2})
- Time zone: UTC-7 (Mountain (MST))
  - Summer (DST): UTC-6 (MDT)
- Area code: 575
- GNIS feature ID: 2584168

Oasis is a census-designated place in Sierra County, New Mexico, United States. As of the 2020 census, Oasis had a population of 161.

== Geography ==
According to the U.S. Census Bureau, the community has an area of 2.090 square miles (5.41 km^{2}), all land.

While Interstate 25 passes through the community, it does not have an exit; the community is approximately halfway between exits 59 and 63. New Mexico State Road 187 also passes through the community. Caballo Lake is located to the east of the community.

== Demographics ==
Historical population
Census	Pop.	Note	%±
2020	161		—
U.S. Decennial Census

== Education ==
Truth or Consequences Municipal Schools is the school district for the entire county. Truth or Consequences Middle School and Hot Springs High School, both in Truth or Consequences, are the district's secondary schools.
