= New Mexico State Road 171 =

State highway in New Mexico, United States

State Road 171
- Warm Springs Boulevard
- Former route of NM-171 highlighted in red

Route information
- Maintained by NMDOT
- Length: 1.6 mi (2.6 km)
- Existed: 1988–2014

Major junctions
- West end: NM 181 in Elephant Butte
- East end: NM 195 in Elephant Butte

Location
- Country: United States
- State: New Mexico
- Counties: Sierra

Highway system
- New Mexico State Highway System; Interstate; US; State; Scenic
| ← NM 170 | → NM 172 |

State Road 171 (NM 171) was a 1.6-mile-long (2.6 km) state highway in the US state of New Mexico by the City of Truth or Consequences. NM 171's western terminus was at NM 181 in the City of Elephant Butte, and the eastern terminus was at NM 195 in Elephant Butte. It is now maintained by the City of Elephant Butte as Warm Springs Boulevard.

== History ==
NM 171 was part of the original routing of NM 52 east of Interstate 25 (US 85). By the 1950s, this road had been bypassed by a new alignment of NM 52 further to the north, and was removed from the state highway system. In the 1988 renumbering, it was reestablished as NM 171. On October 16, 2014, NM 171 was given to the city of Elephant Butte, along with the portion of NM 195 in the city.

== Major intersections ==
The entire route is in Elephant Butte, Sierra County.

| mi | km | Destinations | Notes |
|---|---|---|---|
| 0.000 | 0.000 | NM 181 | Western terminus |
| 1.600 | 2.575 | NM 195 | Eastern terminus |
1.000 mi = 1.609 km; 1.000 km = 0.621 mi

== See also ==
- List of state roads in New Mexico
