= Williamsburg, New Mexico =

- Village
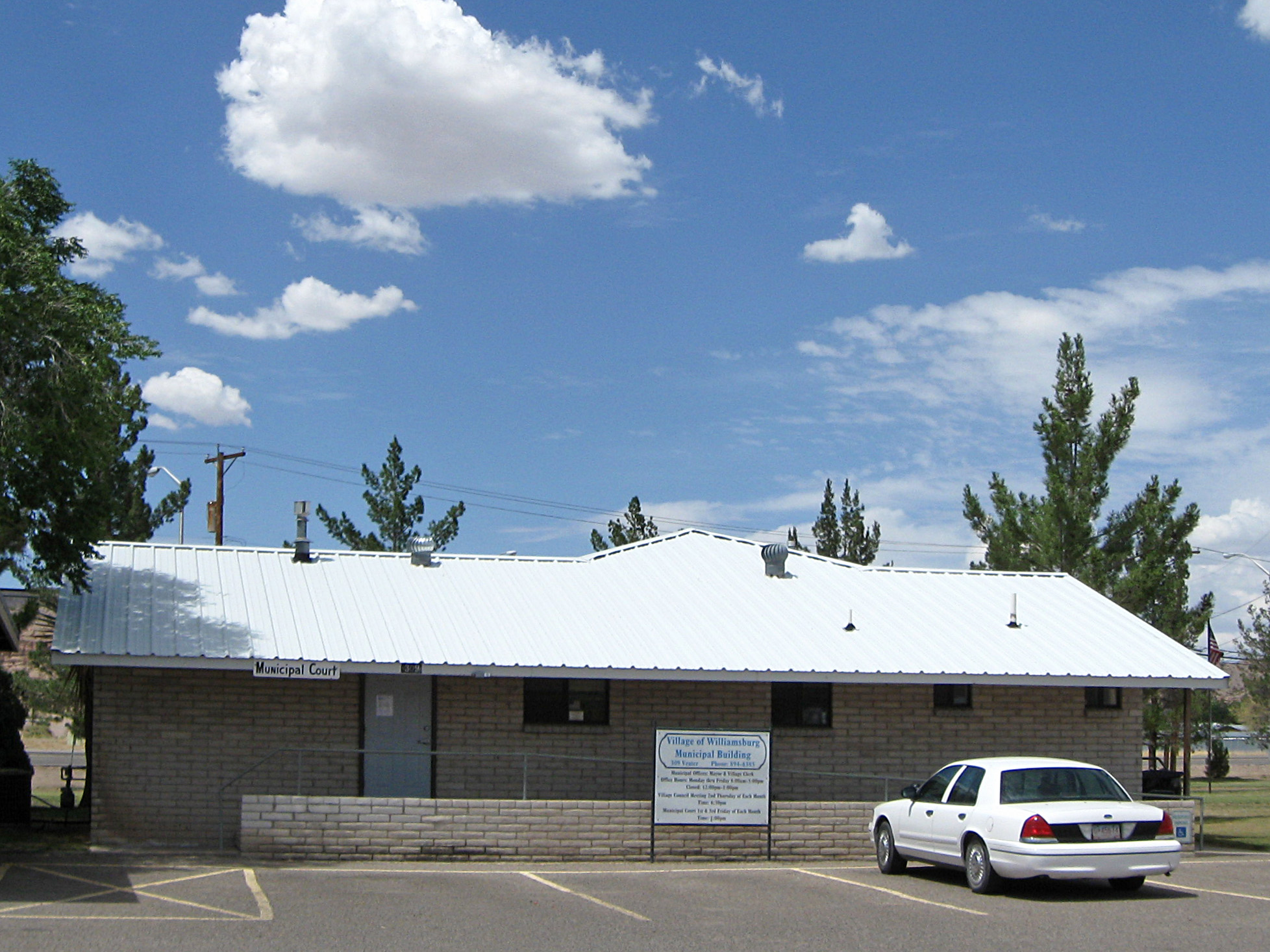
- Williamsburg Municipal Building, June 2009

- Location of Williamsburg, New Mexico

- Location in the United States
- Coordinates: 33°06′57″N 107°17′42″W
- Country: United States
- State: New Mexico
- County: Sierra

Area
  - Total: 0.51 sq mi (1.32 km^{2})
  - Land: 0.49 sq mi (1.26 km^{2})
  - Water: 0.023 sq mi (0.06 km^{2})
- Elevation: 4,236 ft (1,291 m)

Population (2020)
  - Total: 462
  - Density: 950.7/sq mi (367.07/km^{2})
- Time zone: UTC-7 (Mountain (MST))
  - Summer (DST): UTC-6 (MDT)
- ZIP code: 87942
- Area code: 575
- FIPS code: 35-85300
- GNIS feature ID: 2413602
- Website: www.villageofwilliamsburg.com

Williamsburg is a village in Sierra County, New Mexico, United States. The population was 462 at the 2020 census. The village, though small, is located adjacent to Truth or Consequences, and has essentially become a suburb. Though the town is experiencing moderate growth now, especially along I-25, in the near future there is a high possibility of its becoming a booming bedroom community for lakesiders from Elephant Butte. Williamsburg, New Mexico is named after its first mayor, Thomas B. Williams (1893–1967).

== Geography ==
According to the United States Census Bureau, the village has a total area of 0.5 square mile (1.2 km^{2}), all land.

== Demographics ==
Historical population
Census	Pop.	Note	%±
1970	367		—
1980	433		18.0%
1990	456		5.3%
2000	527		15.6%
2010	449		−14.8%
2020	462		2.9%
U.S. Decennial Census

As of the census of 2000, there were 527 people, 264 households, and 153 families residing in the village. The population density was 1,096.2 inhabitants per square mile (423.2/km^{2}). There were 345 housing units at an average density of 717.6 per square mile (277.1/km^{2}). The racial makeup of the village was 91.84% White, 1.71% African American, 0.76% Native American, 0.19% Asian, 1.90% from other races, and 3.61% from two or more races. Hispanic or Latino of any race were 13.09% of the population.

There were 264 households, out of which 15.9% had children under the age of 18 living with them, 43.9% were married couples living together, 8.7% had a female householder with no husband present, and 41.7% were non-families. 35.2% of all households were made up of individuals, and 20.1% had someone living alone who was 65 years of age or older. The average household size was 2.00 and the average family size was 2.51.

In the village, the population was spread out, with 15.9% under the age of 18, 3.4% from 18 to 24, 15.6% from 25 to 44, 29.2% from 45 to 64, and 35.9% who were 65 years of age or older. The median age was 55 years. For every 100 females, there were 102.7 males. For every 100 females age 18 and over, there were 97.8 males.

The median income for a household in the village was $23,750, and the median income for a family was $27,679. Males had a median income of $27,917 versus $19,250 for females. The per capita income for the village was $15,549. About 5.5% of families and 9.6% of the population were below the poverty line, including 9.7% of those under age 18 and 6.2% of those age 65 or over.

== Education ==
Truth or Consequences Municipal Schools is the school district for the entire county. Truth or Consequences Middle School and Hot Springs High School, both in Truth or Consequences, are the district's secondary schools.

== See also ==
- List of municipalities in New Mexico
