= White elephant (disambiguation) =

A white elephant is a supposedly valuable possession whose cost exceeds its usefulness.

White Elephant or white elephant may also refer to:

- White elephant (animal), a rare kind of albino elephant (not a distinct species)

== Film and television ==
- White Elephant (1984 film), a British comedy drama
- White Elephant (2012 film), an Argentine drama
- White Elephant (2022 film), an American action film
- White Elephant (upcoming film), an American Christmas horror film
- "The White Elephant", an episode of the British television series The Avengers
- White Elephant award, given by the Russian Guild of Film Critics

== Music ==
- White Elephant (band), a jazz-rock big band led by Mike Mainieri
- "White Elephant", a single by Ladytron from their album Gravity the Seducer
- The White Elephant Sessions, an album by Jars of Clay

== Other uses ==
- White Elephant (Shahnameh), an animal in the Persian epic poem the Shahnameh
- White Elephant Butte, a mountain in Nevada, U.S.
- White elephant gift exchange, a holiday party game
- White elephant sale, a sale of used items
- Order of the White Elephant, a Thai honour
- White Elephant Saloon, in the San Antonio Sporting District, Texas
- White Elephant, in Hell's Half Acre, Fort Worth, Texas
- Six-tusked White Elephant in Chinese Buddhism

== See also ==
- Elephant White, a 2011 American action-thriller film
