= Caballo, New Mexico =

- Census-designated place
- Location within New Mexico
- Coordinates: 32°58′50″N 107°18′27″W
- Country: United States
- State: New Mexico
- County: Sierra

Area
  - Total: 0.98 sq mi (2.54 km^{2})
  - Land: 0.98 sq mi (2.54 km^{2})
  - Water: 0 sq mi (0.00 km^{2})
- Elevation: 4,272 ft (1,302 m)

Population (2020)
  - Total: 77
  - Density: 78.5/sq mi (30.32/km^{2})
- Time zone: UTC-7 (Mountain (MST))
  - Summer (DST): UTC-6 (MDT)
- ZIP code: 87931
- Area code: 575
- GNIS feature ID: 2584062

Caballo is a census-designated place in Sierra County, New Mexico, United States. As of the 2020 census, Caballo had a population of 77. Caballo has a post office with ZIP code 87931. The community is located along New Mexico State Road 187, north and south of Exit 63 on Interstate 25.

Caballo was founded in 1908, when John Gordon and his extended family homesteaded here. It was named after the mountains to the east. A post office was established in 1916. In 1938, the Caballo Dam was constructed, creating a lake which forced residents to re-establish the community to the west. The lake is host to Caballo Lake State Park.

== Geography ==
Caballo is located at 32.980625°N 107.307469°W. According to the U.S. Census Bureau, the CDP has an area of 0.979 square miles (2.54 km^{2}), all land. The area stretches for over five miles and includes an active fire department and many businesses, and residences. It borders Caballo Lake State Park.

== Demographics ==
Historical population
Census	Pop.	Note	%±
2020	77		—
U.S. Decennial Census

== Education ==
Truth or Consequences Municipal Schools is the school district for the entire county. Truth or Consequences Middle School and Hot Springs High School, both in Truth or Consequences, are the district's secondary schools.
