= Chloride, New Mexico =

Unincorporated community in New Mexico, US

Chloride
- Unincorporated community
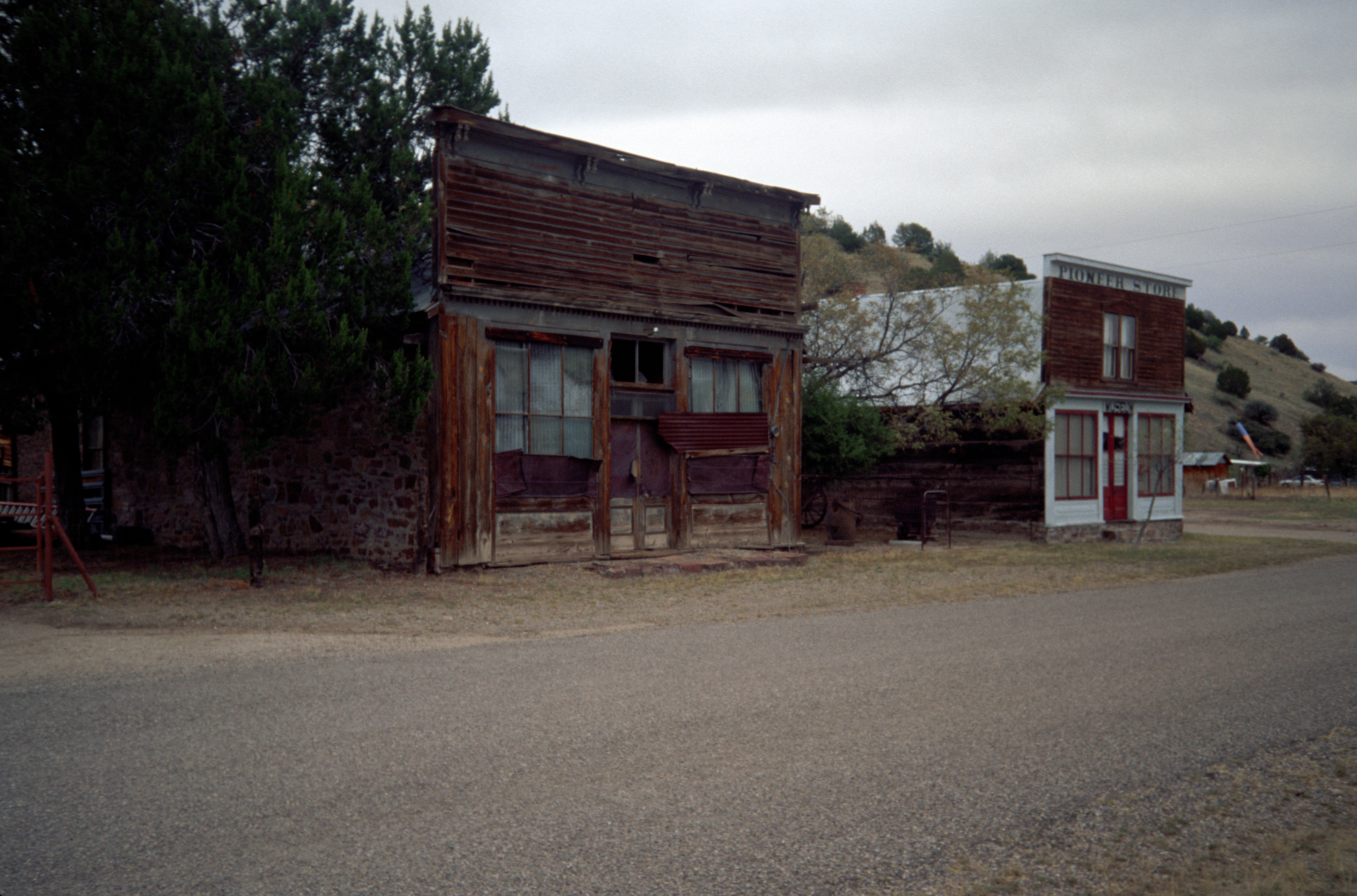
- The buildings of Chloride look much as they have for the past 100 years. Once a booming silver mining town, few buildings remain.

- Location within the state of New Mexico Chloride (the United States)
- Country: United States
- State: New Mexico
- County: Sierra
- Elevation: 6,181 ft (1,884 m)
- Time zone: UTC-7 (Mountain (MST))
  - Summer (DST): UTC-6 (MDT)
- GNIS feature ID: 905118

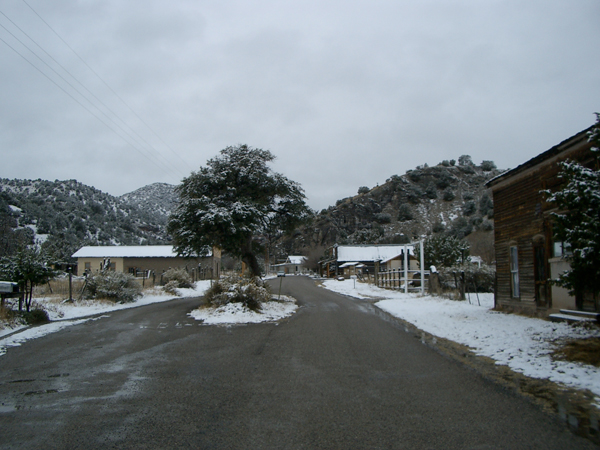
The "Hanging Tree" was probably never used for hanging criminals but miscreants were sometimes chained to it as punishment.

Chloride is an unincorporated community and ghost town in Sierra County, in the U.S. state of New Mexico. The community is located on the eastern flanks of the Black Range at the confluence of Chloride Creek with Mineral Creek. Founded about 1880 due to the discovery of silver chloride near the town site, most of the old mine workings are to the west, along Chloride Creek. Winston, another ghost town, is approximately three miles to the east. Chloride reached a peak population of nearly 3,000 in 1890. The population declined rapidly thereafter due to reduced prices for silver and the demonetization of silver by the U.S. government. Chloride became a ghost town before the mid-20th century and has only a few residents although some of the original buildings remain and have been preserved.

== History ==
In 1879, an Englishman, Henry Pye, was hauling freight to a military camp at Ojo Caliente. He found what he thought be a vein of silver in a creek bed. The assay indicated it was silver chloride (hence the name of the town). He kept his discovery a secret until completing his contract with the U.S. army. Pye initially had trouble persuading people to join him in exploiting his discovery as Chloride was in an area frequented by Victorio and the Warm Springs Apaches. Two men eventually joined him. They traveled to the site of what would become Chloride and built a cabin and staked a claim which was called the Pye lode. Pye was killed by the Apache shortly afterward. In January 1881, Apaches attacked 18 miners, killing two and driving the others away. The miners returned in force in March 1881 and by late that year Chloride was a town, reputedly with eight saloons, a church, school, a newspaper, and a population of 500. A post office was established at Chloride in 1881, and remained in operation until 1956. In 1890, almost 3,000 people lived in Chloride.

The discovery of silver led to the creation of several other communities in the area, especially Winston (originally Fairfield), 3 miles (4.8 km) east. The mining region was called the Apache. The most valuable mine was the Silver Monument, 10 miles (16 km) west of Chloride near the crest of the Black Range. It produced 100,000 dollars in silver and other ores by 1893. A dozen other mines were scattered around Chloride and produced in total more than 500,000 dollars in minerals. An ore smelter briefly operated in Chloride. Production from the mines mostly ceased by 1931.

In the 1890s, the market price of silver consistently declined and in 1896 the U.S. government halted the purchase of silver to make coins. Chloride and other silver mining towns quickly declined. By 1905 Chloride had a population of only 300 people. In 1946, the population was only 46.

In September 1906, the Apache warrior Massai was killed near Chloride by a posse of local ranchers.

== Education ==
Truth or Consequences Municipal Schools is the school district for the entire county. Truth or Consequences Middle School and Hot Springs High School, both in Truth or Consequences, are the district's secondary schools.
