= Arrey, New Mexico =

- Census-designated place
- Location within New Mexico
- Coordinates: 32°50′50″N 107°19′13″W
- Country: United States
- State: New Mexico
- County: Sierra

Area
  - Total: 0.79 sq mi (2.05 km^{2})
  - Land: 0.79 sq mi (2.05 km^{2})
  - Water: 0 sq mi (0.00 km^{2})
- Elevation: 4,200 ft (1,300 m)

Population (2020)
  - Total: 296
  - Density: 374.8/sq mi (144.71/km^{2})
- Time zone: UTC-7 (Mountain (MST))
  - Summer (DST): UTC-6 (MDT)
- Area code: 575
- GNIS feature ID: 2584052

Arrey is a census-designated place in Sierra County, New Mexico, United States. It lies about 22 miles (35.4 km) south of Truth or Consequences. As of the 2020 census, its population was 296.

== History ==
In 1890, the town was founded as Bonito when several Hispanic families made a deal with a cattle agent to settle here. The land was then deeded to the Butte Land and Cattle Company after the land was proved. In 1901 a post office was established, with Urbano Arrey, who gave his name to the community, as the first postmaster. Today descendants of the original homesteaders still live in the community.

== Geography ==
Arrey is located along the Rio Grande, being located in the valley. The town is located around 8 miles south of Caballo Lake, 55 miles northwest of Las Cruces, and 20 miles south of Truth or Consequences.

== Economy ==
Much of the Arrey economy is based around agriculture. Specifically, the local economy is based around the cultivation of chili peppers, cotton, onions, pumpkins, alfalfa, amongst a series of other crops.

== Infrastructure ==
=== Transportation ===
==== Airports ====
- Truth or Consequences Municipal Airport, located approximately 30 miles north of Arrey.

==== Major highways ====
- Interstate 25

== Demographics ==
Historical population
Census	Pop.	Note	%±
2020	296		—
U.S. Decennial Census

As of the 2020 United States census, Arrey was recorded as having 296 residents and 115 houses.

== Education ==
Truth or Consequences Municipal Schools is the district school for the entire county. It operates Arrey Elementary School in Arrey. Truth or Consequences Middle School and Hot Springs High School, both in Truth or Consequences, are the district's secondary schools.
