= Hot Springs Landing, New Mexico =

- Census-designated place
- Location within New Mexico
- Coordinates: 33°12′17″N 107°12′36″W
- Country: United States
- State: New Mexico
- County: Sierra

Area
  - Total: 0.45 sq mi (1.17 km^{2})
  - Land: 0.45 sq mi (1.17 km^{2})
  - Water: 0 sq mi (0.00 km^{2})
- Elevation: 4,534 ft (1,382 m)

Population (2020)
  - Total: 120
  - Density: 266.3/sq mi (102.82/km^{2})
- Time zone: UTC-7 (Mountain (MST))
  - Summer (DST): UTC-6 (MDT)
- Area code: 575
- GNIS feature ID: 2584114

Hot Springs Landing is a census-designated place in Sierra County, New Mexico, United States. As of the 2020 census, Hot Springs Landing had a population of 120. The community is located on the western shore of Elephant Butte Reservoir.

== Geography ==
Hot Springs Landing is located at 33.204673°N 107.209988°W. According to the U.S. Census Bureau, the community has an area of 0.453 square miles (1.17 km^{2}), all land.

== Demographics ==
Historical population
Census	Pop.	Note	%±
2020	120		—
U.S. Decennial Census

== Education ==
Truth or Consequences Municipal Schools is the school district for the entire county. Truth or Consequences Middle School and Hot Springs High School, both in Truth or Consequences, are the district's secondary schools.
