= New Mexico State Road 59 =

State highway in New Mexico, United States

State Road 59
- NM 59 highlighted in red

Route information
- Maintained by NMDOT
- Length: 31.089 mi (50.033 km)

Major junctions
- East end: NM 52 North of Winston
- West end: Former NM 61 by Beaverhead

Location
- Country: United States
- State: New Mexico
- Counties: Catron, Sierra

Highway system
- New Mexico State Highway System; Interstate; US; State; Scenic
← NM 58	→ US 60

State Road 59 (NM 59) is a state highway in the US state of New Mexico. Its total length is approximately 31 miles (50 km). NM 59's eastern terminus is north of the village of Winston at NM 52, and the western terminus is at the former NM 61 by Beaverhead.

== Major intersections ==
County	Location	mi	km	Destinations	Notes
Sierra		0.000	0.000	NM 52	Eastern terminus
Catron	Beaverhead	31.089	50.033	Former NM 61	Western terminus
1.000 mi = 1.609 km; 1.000 km = 0.621 mi
