= Kingston, New Mexico =

- Census-designated place
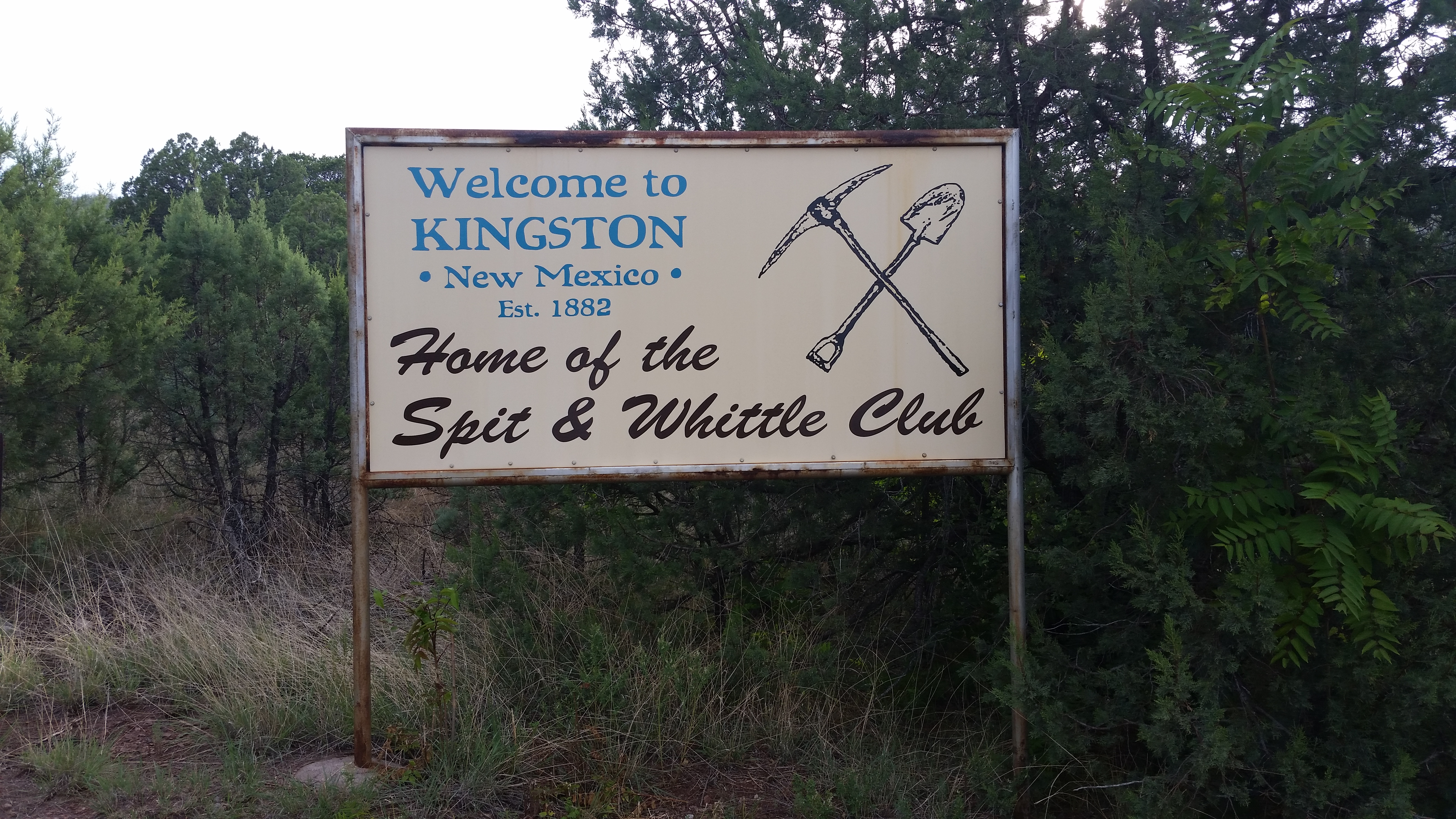
- Kingston, New Mexico

- Location within New Mexico
- Coordinates: 32°55′02″N 107°42′34″W
- Country: United States
- State: New Mexico
- County: Sierra

Area
  - Total: 0.20 sq mi (0.52 km^{2})
  - Land: 0.20 sq mi (0.52 km^{2})
  - Water: 0 sq mi (0.00 km^{2})
- Elevation: 6,240 ft (1,900 m)

Population (2020)
  - Total: 50
  - Density: 251.2/sq mi (96.98/km^{2})
- Time zone: UTC-7 (Mountain (MST))
  - Summer (DST): UTC-6 (MDT)
- Area code: 575
- GNIS feature ID: 2584118

Kingston is a census-designated place (CDP) in Sierra County, New Mexico, United States. As of the 2020 census, Kingston had a population of 50. The community is located in the Black Range along New Mexico State Road 152.

== History ==
Jack Sheddon discovered silver in what would become the Solitaire Mine in 1882. Originally called Percha City, Kingston was surveyed the same year and soon had a population of 1800. Lillian Russell once performed here.

The Depression of 1893 curtailed mining activities in the area, though there was a brief resurgence during World War II. By 1952 however, most production had ceased.

== Geography ==
Kingston is located at 32.917334°N 107.709559°W. According to the U.S. Census Bureau, the community has an area of 0.199 square miles (0.52 km^{2}), all land.

== Geology ==
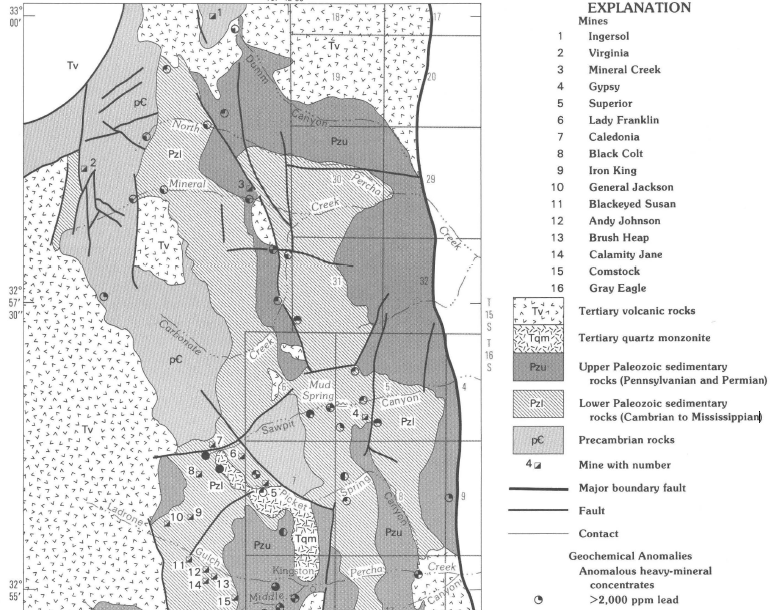
Kingston New Mexico geological map showing mine locations.

Following prospecting developments in Hillsboro to the east, silver was discovered in the district in 1880, and extensive mining efforts commenced in 1883. From 1883 to 1893, almost 6,000,000 ounces of silver were produced from 27 mines. From 1934 to 1957, 67,940 ounces of silver were produced, plus 124 ounces of gold. Base metal ores were produced from 1930 to 1949.

The Iron King, Empire, and Brush Heap were some of the first mines in the area. Most production was within 460 feet of the surface in the supergene zone. Ore minerals included cerargyrite, native silver, polybasite, and argentiferous galena. From 1952 to 1959, 5,689 tons of manganese ore were produced from the Fusselman Dolomite, mainly from the Iron King Mine. Pyrolusite is the main manganese ore mineral.

Ore deposits occurred mainly along major fault fissure veins. These faults may represent the outer margin of the Emory Caldera. Most mineralization occurred in the Late Oligocene.

The Lady Franklin Mine was the largest producer of high-grade silver from 1880 to 1893, averaging 15 ounces per ton.

== Demographics ==
Historical population
Census	Pop.	Note	%±
2020	50		—
U.S. Decennial Census

== Education ==
Truth or Consequences Municipal Schools is the school district for the entire county. Truth or Consequences Middle School and Hot Springs High School, both in Truth or Consequences, are the district's secondary schools.

== Notable person ==
- Edward L. Doheny

== Gallery ==
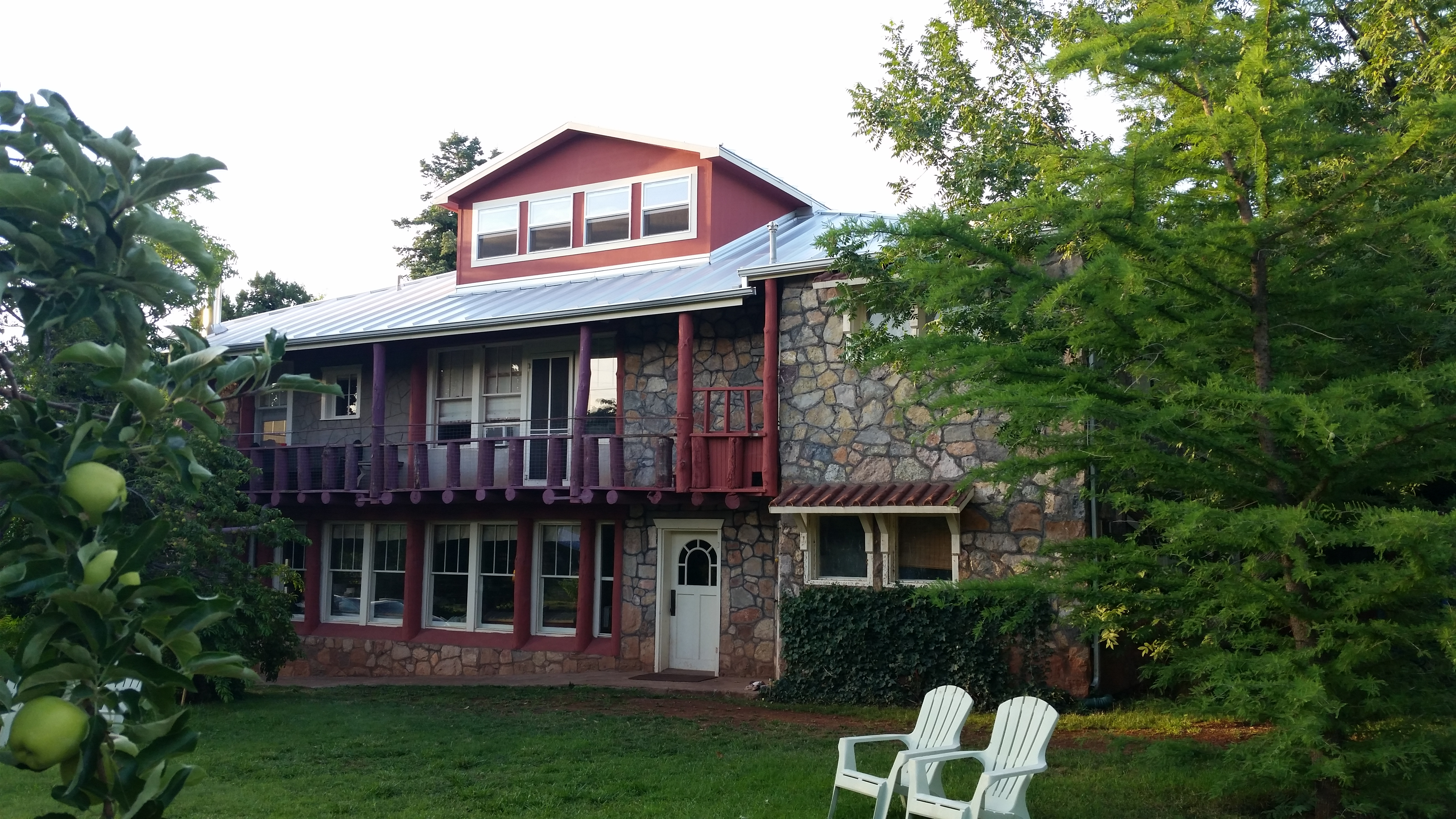
Black Range Lodge

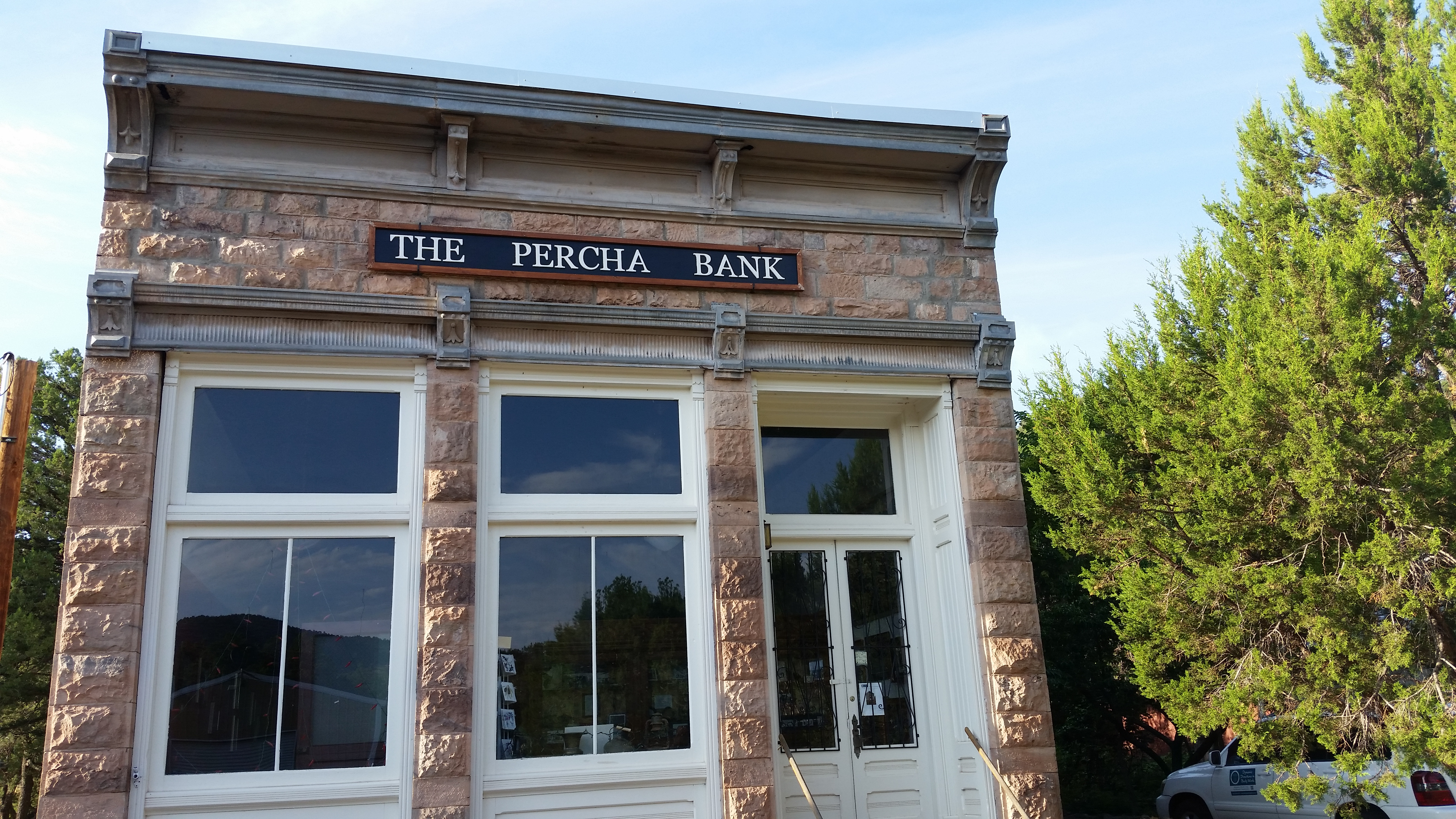
Former Percha Bank, now a museum

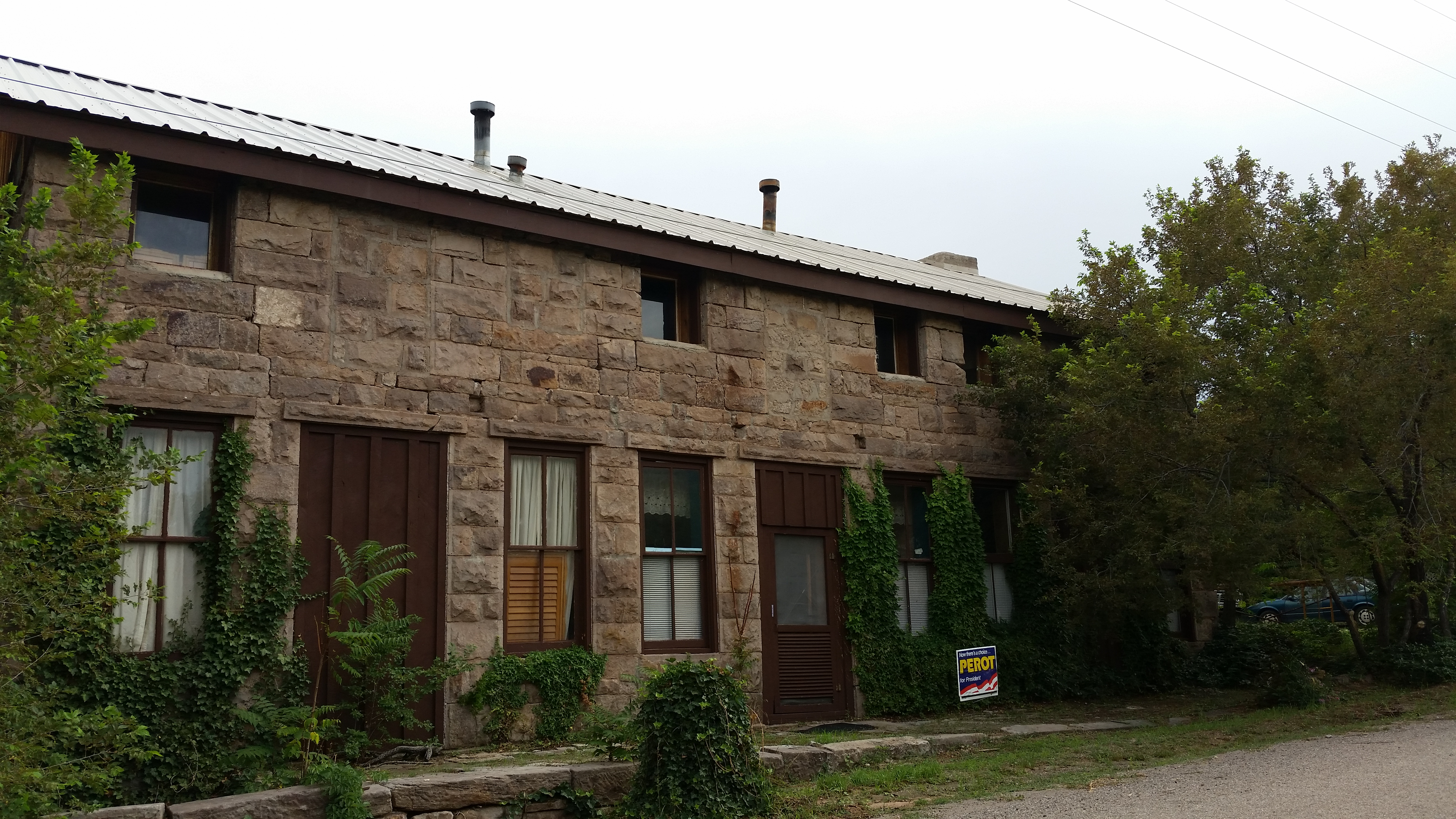
Former Victorio Hotel

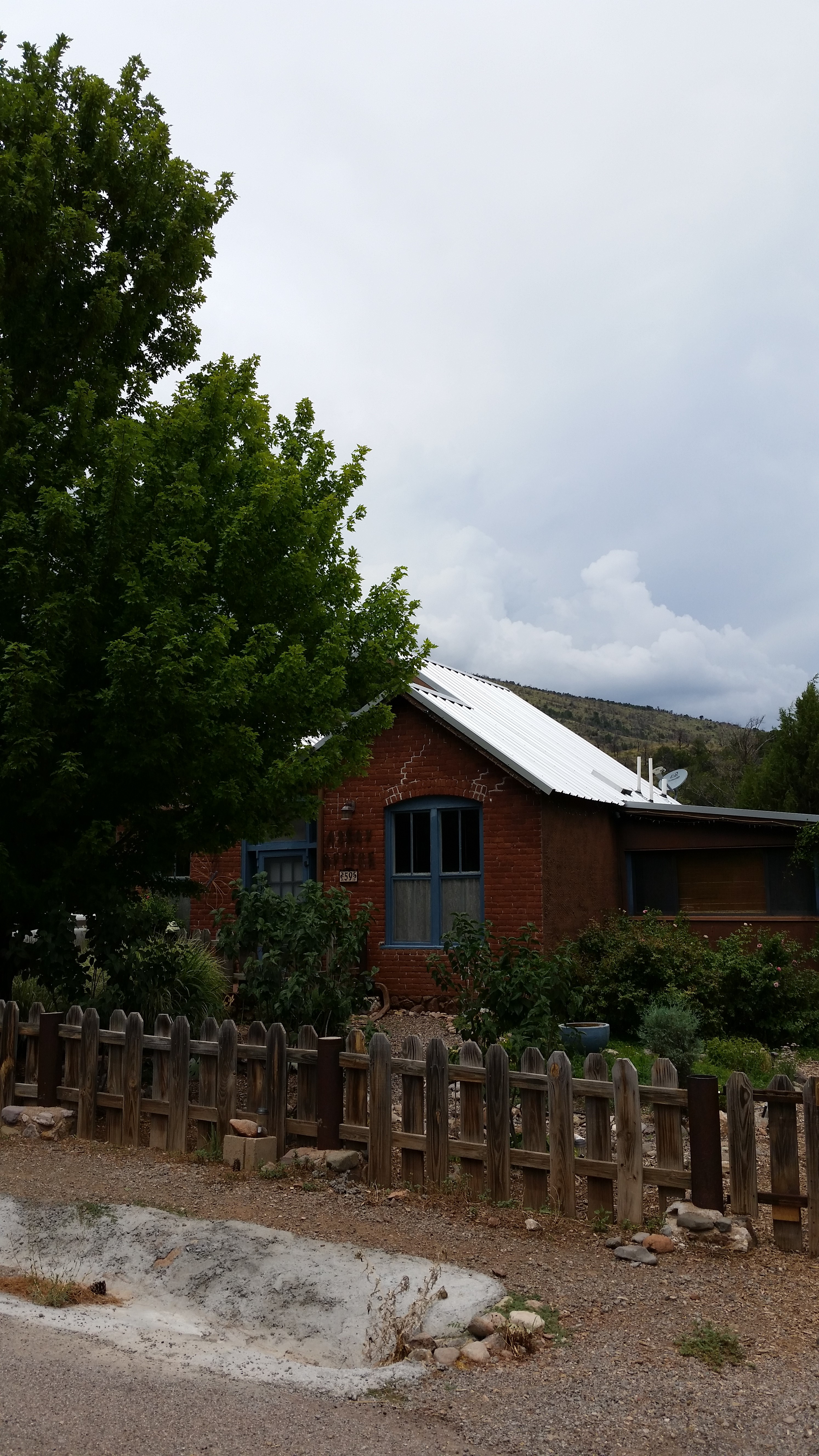
Former Assay Office

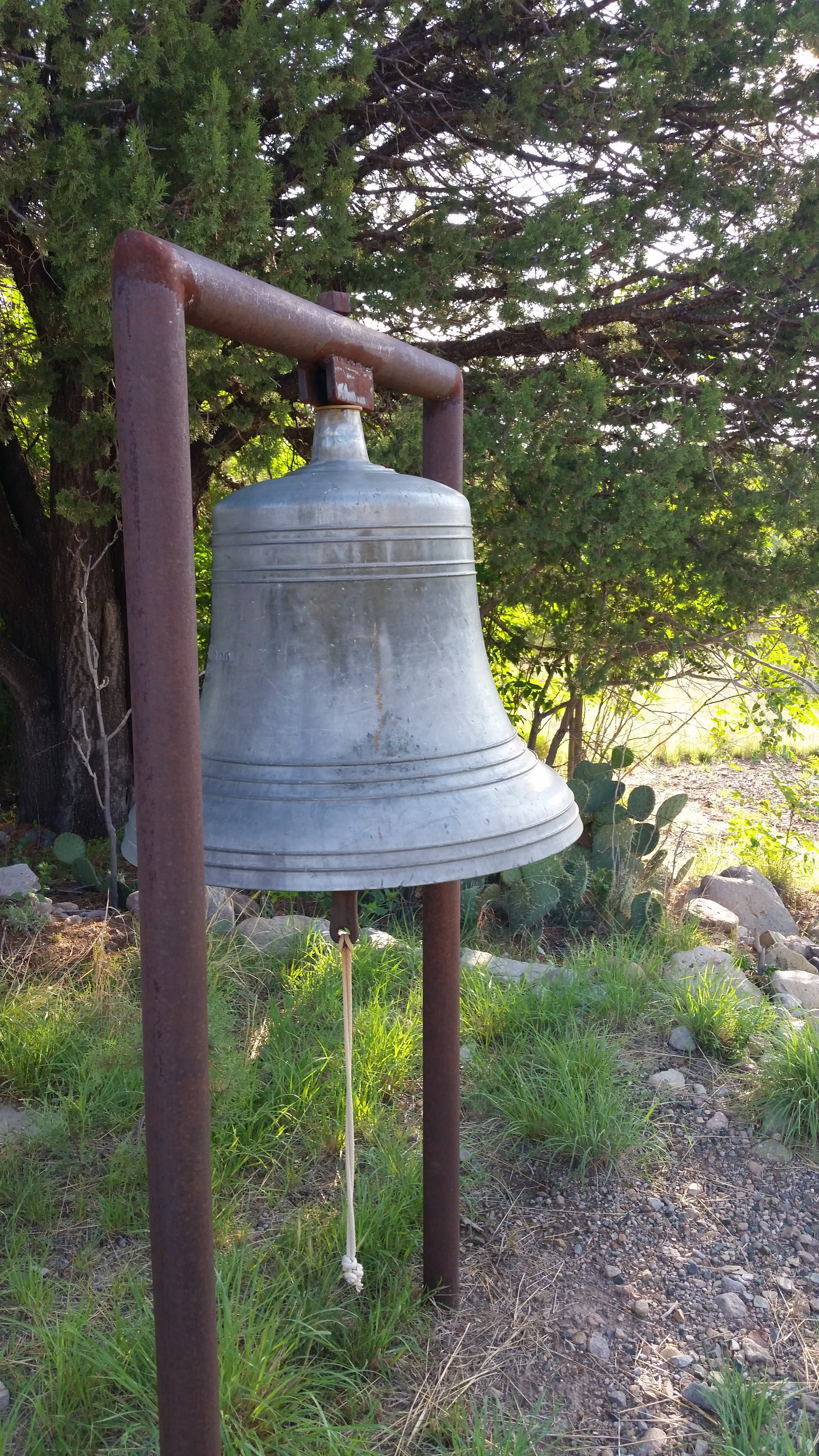
Kingston's fire bell was also used to announce the arrival of mail.

== See also ==
- List of census-designated places in New Mexico
- Hillsboro, New Mexico
