= Elephant Butte, Sierra County, New Mexico =

Localised community within a larger area

Elephant Butte is a populated place on the southeast end of the Elephant Butte Reservoir in Sierra County, New Mexico, United States. It should not be confused with the modern city of Elephant Butte, New Mexico that is on the west side of the reservoir to the northwest of this place. This site lies at an elevation of 4,465 feet (1,361 meters) and overlooks Elephant Butte to the north, the geographic feature that gives its name to all these locations.

Elephant Butte was a town formed to house people and activities supporting the construction of the Elephant Butte Dam and had its own post office during 1919 and 1920, when the mail was sent to Engle. Elephant Butte Cemetery lies on a hillside to the east at 33°08′40″N 107°10′24″W. Interments at the cemetery date from 1912 to June 20, 1989. The site of Elephant Butte is currently the location of the Elephant Butte Dam Site Resort & Marina.
