= New Mexico State Road 181 =

State highway in New Mexico, United States

State Road 181
- NM 181 highlighted in red

Route information
- Maintained by NMDOT
- Length: 11.820 mi (19.022 km)

Major junctions
- South end: I-25 BL in Truth or Consequences
- I-25 / US 85 near Truth or Consequences
- North end: End of state maintenance near Truth or Consequences

Location
- Country: United States
- State: New Mexico
- Counties: Sierra

Highway system
- New Mexico State Highway System; Interstate; US; State; Scenic
← US 180	→ NM 182

State Road 181 (NM 181) is a 11.8-mile-long (19.0 km) state highway in the US state of New Mexico. NM 181's southern terminus is at Interstate 25 Business (I-25 Bus.) in Truth or Consequences, and the northern terminus is at the end of state maintenance north of Truth or Consequences.

== Major intersections ==
The entire route is in Sierra County.

Location	mi	km	Destinations	Notes
Truth or Consequences	0.000	0.000	I-25 BL	Southern terminus
Elephant Butte	1.540	2.478	Warm Springs Boulevard	Western terminus of former NM 171
	5.000– 5.470	8.047– 8.803	I-25 / US 85 / NM 195 south	I-25 exit 83; northern terminus of NM 195
	7.500	12.070	NM 52 north	Southern terminus of NM 52
	10.450	16.818	Frontage Road 2028 to I-25 / US 85	
	11.820	19.022	End of state maintenance	Northern terminus
1.000 mi = 1.609 km; 1.000 km = 0.621 mi

== See also ==
- List of state roads in New Mexico
