= Placitas, Sierra County, New Mexico =

Populated place in New Mexico, US

Coordinates: 33°22′38″N 107°25′59″W

Placitas is a populated place in Montecello Canyon just southeast of Monticello on Highway 142 in Sierra County, New Mexico, United States. The elevation of Placitas is 5,204 feet. It has a population of 576 as of 2020.

The correct name of this town appears to be up for debate. In his book The Place Names of New Mexico, Robert Julyan states that the town’s inhabitants call it "Las Placitas". Despite that he calls it Placita. The local highway signage in Sierra County uses "Placita". The Geographic Names Information Service calls it Placitas and Placitas appears under that name on the Monticello U.S. Geological Survey Map.

== Education ==
Truth or Consequences Municipal Schools is the school district for the entire county. Truth or Consequences Middle School and Hot Springs High School, both in Truth or Consequences, are the district's secondary schools.
