= Placitas, New Mexico =

The word Placitas in Spanish means small square. It usually refers to a town square or plaza at the center of a village or hamlet as is customary in Latin America. The word is sometimes used as the name of a village with a plaza. Placitas may refer to several places:

- Placitas, Doña Ana County, New Mexico, a census-designated place
- Placitas, Lincoln County, New Mexico, name changed to Lincoln in 1869.
- Placitas, Sandoval County, New Mexico, a census-designated place
- Placitas, Sierra County, New Mexico, the northern or eastern terminus of the NM 142
