= New Mexico State Road 165 =

Highway in New Mexico, US

State Road 165

Route information
- Maintained by NMDOT
- Length: 16.754 mi (26.963 km)

Major junctions
- West end: I-25 / US 85 / US 550 in Bernalillo
- East end: NM 536 north of Sandia Peak Ski Area

Location
- Country: United States
- State: New Mexico
- Counties: Bernalillo, Sandoval

Highway system
- New Mexico State Highway System; Interstate; US; State; Scenic
← NM 163	→ NM 166

State Road 165 (NM 165) is a 16.754 mi (26.963 km) long state highway in the US state of New Mexico. NM 165's western terminus is at Interstate 25 (I-25), U.S. Route 85 (US 85), and US 550 in Bernalillo, and the eastern terminus is at NM 536 north of Sandia Peak Ski Area.

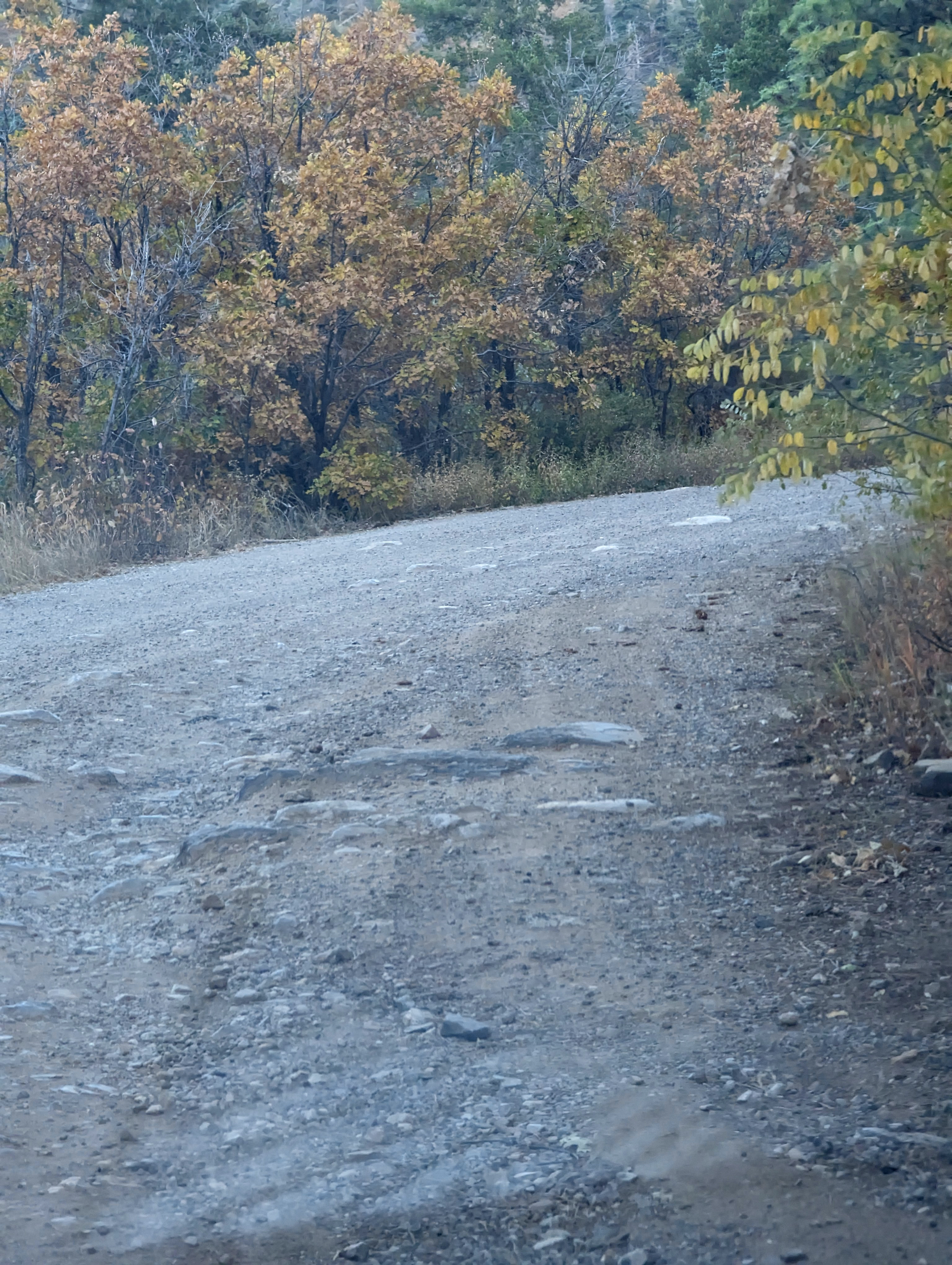
Unimproved portion of NM-165

East of Placitas, the road turns south, goes up Las Huertas Canyon, becoming an unpaved, bumpy road that is one of the two last roads to be plowed in the winter.

== History ==
NM 165 was established in 1988. It was formerly the eastern section of NM 44.

== Major intersections ==
County	Location	mi	km	Destinations	Notes
Sandoval	Bernalillo	0.000	0.000	I-25 / US 85 / US 550 north	Western terminus, southern terminus of US 550, I-25 exit 242
Sandoval	Bernalillo	0.124	0.200	FR 2080 / FR 2083	
Bernalillo		16.754	26.963	NM 536	Eastern terminus
1.000 mi = 1.609 km; 1.000 km = 0.621 mi

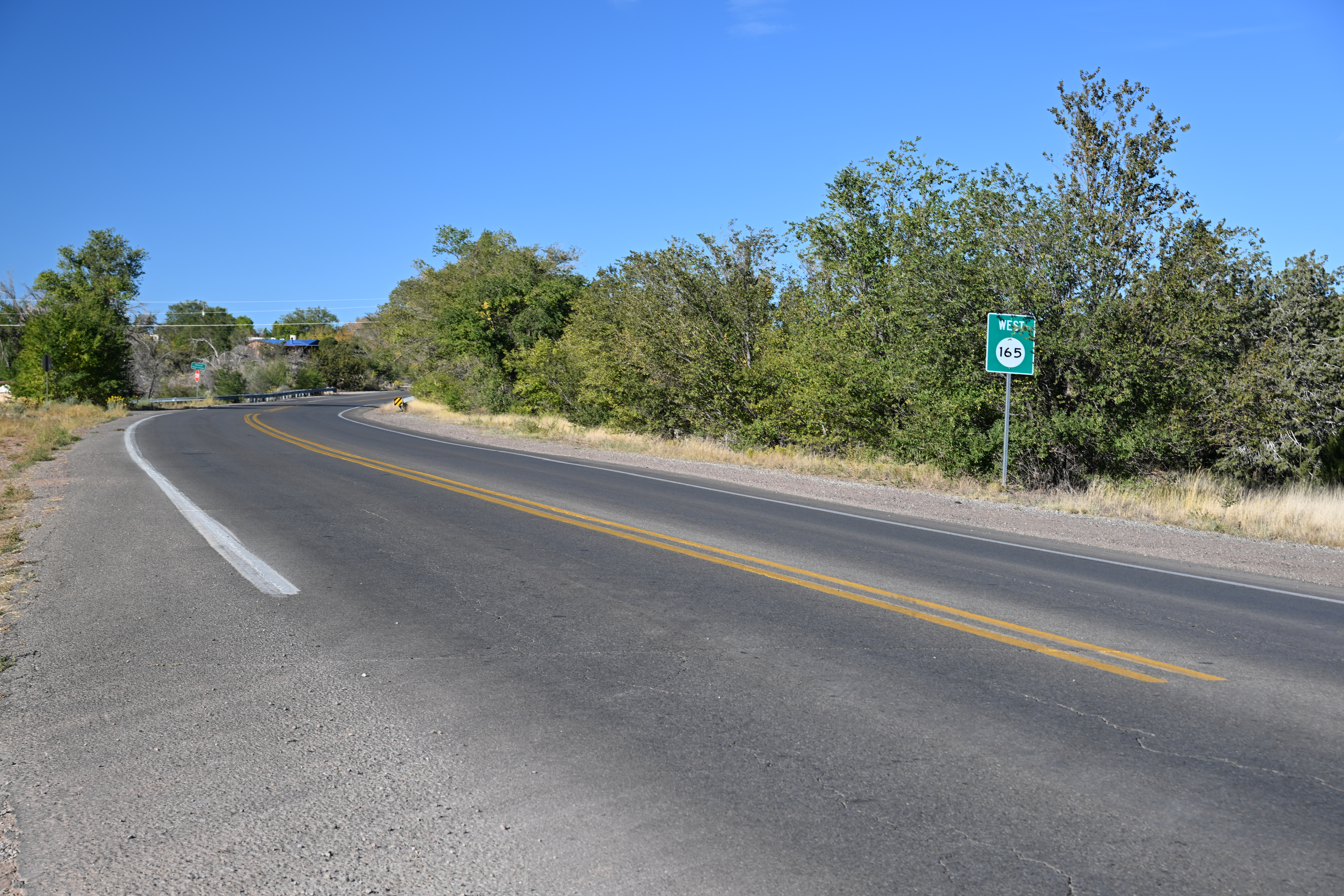
NM-165 looking west
