= New Mexico State Road 163 =

Highway in New Mexico

State Road 163
- NM 163 highlighted in red

Route information
- Maintained by NMDOT
- Length: 40.100 mi (64.535 km)

Major junctions
- South end: Former NM 61
- North end: NM 52 in Logan

Location
- Country: United States
- State: New Mexico
- Counties: Catron, Socorro

Highway system
- New Mexico State Highway System; Interstate; US; State; Scenic
← NM 162	→ NM 165

State Road 163 (NM 163) is a 40.100-mile-long (64.535 km) state highway in the US state of New Mexico. NM 163's southern terminus is at the end of state maintenance at the former NM 61, and the northern terminus is at NM 52.

== Major intersections ==
County	Location	mi	km	Destinations	Notes
Socorro		0.000	0.000	NM 52	Northern terminus
Catron		40.100	64.535	Former NM 61	Southern terminus
1.000 mi = 1.609 km; 1.000 km = 0.621 mi
