= New Mexico State Road 142 =

State highway in New Mexico, United States

State Road 142
- NM 142 highlighted in red

Route information
- Maintained by NMDOT
- Length: 10.088 mi (16.235 km)

Major junctions
- South end: NM 52 near Cuchillo
- North end: End of state maintenance by Monticello

Location
- Country: United States
- State: New Mexico
- Counties: Sierra

Highway system
- New Mexico State Highway System; Interstate; US; State; Scenic
← NM 140	→ NM 143

State Road 142 (NM 142) is a 10.09-mile-long (16.24 km) state highway in the US state of New Mexico. NM 142's southern terminus is at NM 52 east of Cuchillo, and the northern terminus is at the end of state maintenance by Monticello.

== Major intersections ==
The entire route is in Sierra County.

Location	mi	km	Destinations	Notes
	0.000	0.000	NM 52	Southern terminus
	10.088	16.235	End of state maintenance	Northern terminus
1.000 mi = 1.609 km; 1.000 km = 0.621 mi
