= New Mexico State Road 179 =

State highway in New Mexico, United States

State Road 179

Route information
- Maintained by NMDOT
- Length: 2.050 mi (3.299 km)

Major junctions
- South end: NM 51 in Truth or Consequences
- North end: NM 195 near Truth or Consequences

Location
- Country: United States
- State: New Mexico
- Counties: Sierra

Highway system
- New Mexico State Highway System; Interstate; US; State; Scenic
← NM 178	→ US 180

State Road 179 (NM 179) is a 2.050-mile-long (3.299 km) state highway in the US state of New Mexico. NM 179's southern terminus is at NM 51 in Truth or Consequences, and the northern terminus is at NM 195 northeast of Truth or Consequences. It is a 2-lane paved the entire length.

== History ==
NM 179 was first established in the mid-1930s in Lincoln County. By the early 1940s this became an extension of NM 42. Then in the 1988 renumbering when NM 42 was broken up into smaller segments it became NM 247 and the NM 179 designation was moved to its current location. NM 179 now carries NM 195 through traffic since the road over the Elephant Butte Dam was closed in 2001. Prior to the closing of the dam, it carried westbound NM 195 through traffic when one-way traffic over the dam was permitted.

== Major intersections ==
The entire route is in Sierra County.

Location	mi	km	Destinations	Notes
Truth or Consequences	0.000	0.000	NM 51	Southern terminus
	2.050	3.299	NM 195	Northern terminus
1.000 mi = 1.609 km; 1.000 km = 0.621 mi
