= New Mexico State Road 536 =

Highway in New Mexico

State Road 536
- Sandia Crest Scenic Highway
- NM 536 highlighted in red

Route information
- Maintained by NMDOT
- Length: 13.392 mi (21.552 km)
- Tourist routes: Turquoise Trail

Major junctions
- West end: Dead end at Sandia Crest
- NM 165 north of Sandia Peak Ski Area
- East end: NM 14 in San Antonito

Location
- Country: United States
- State: New Mexico
- Counties: Bernalillo, Sandoval

Highway system
- New Mexico State Highway System; Interstate; US; State; Scenic
← NM 533	→ NM 537

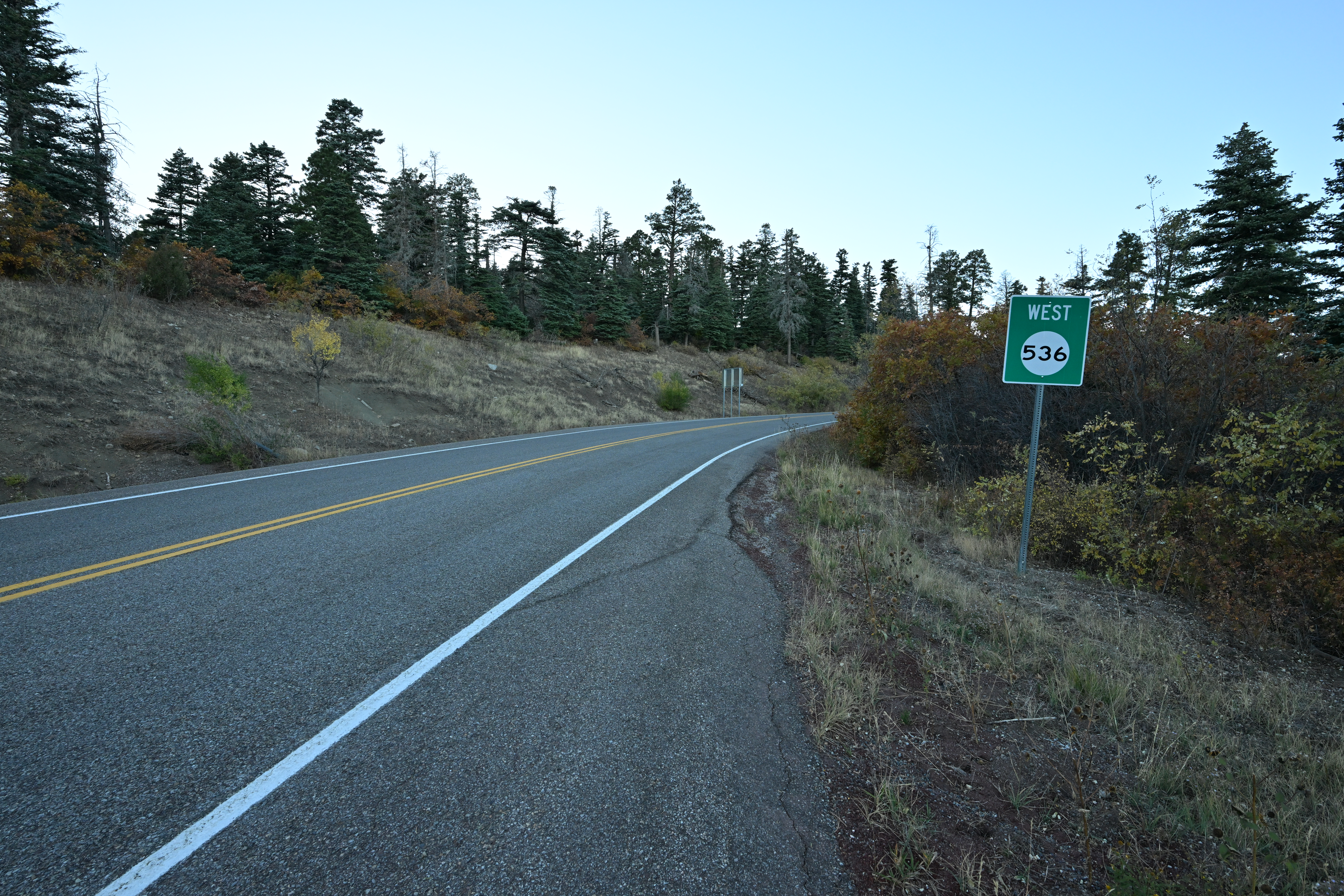
New Mexico State Road 536 near the intersection with NM 165

State Road 536 (NM 536) is a 13.392 mi (21.552 km) long state highway in the US state of New Mexico. NM 536's western terminus is a dead end at Sandia Crest and the eastern terminus is in San Antonito, at NM 14.

== Major intersections ==
County	Location	mi	km	Destinations	Notes
Bernalillo	San Antonito	0.000	0.000	NM 14	Eastern terminus
Bernalillo		7.568	12.180	NM 165 west	Eastern terminus of NM 165
Sandoval		13.392	21.552	Dead end at Sandia Crest	Western terminus
1.000 mi = 1.609 km; 1.000 km = 0.621 mi
