= Caballo Lake State Park =

State park in New Mexico, United States

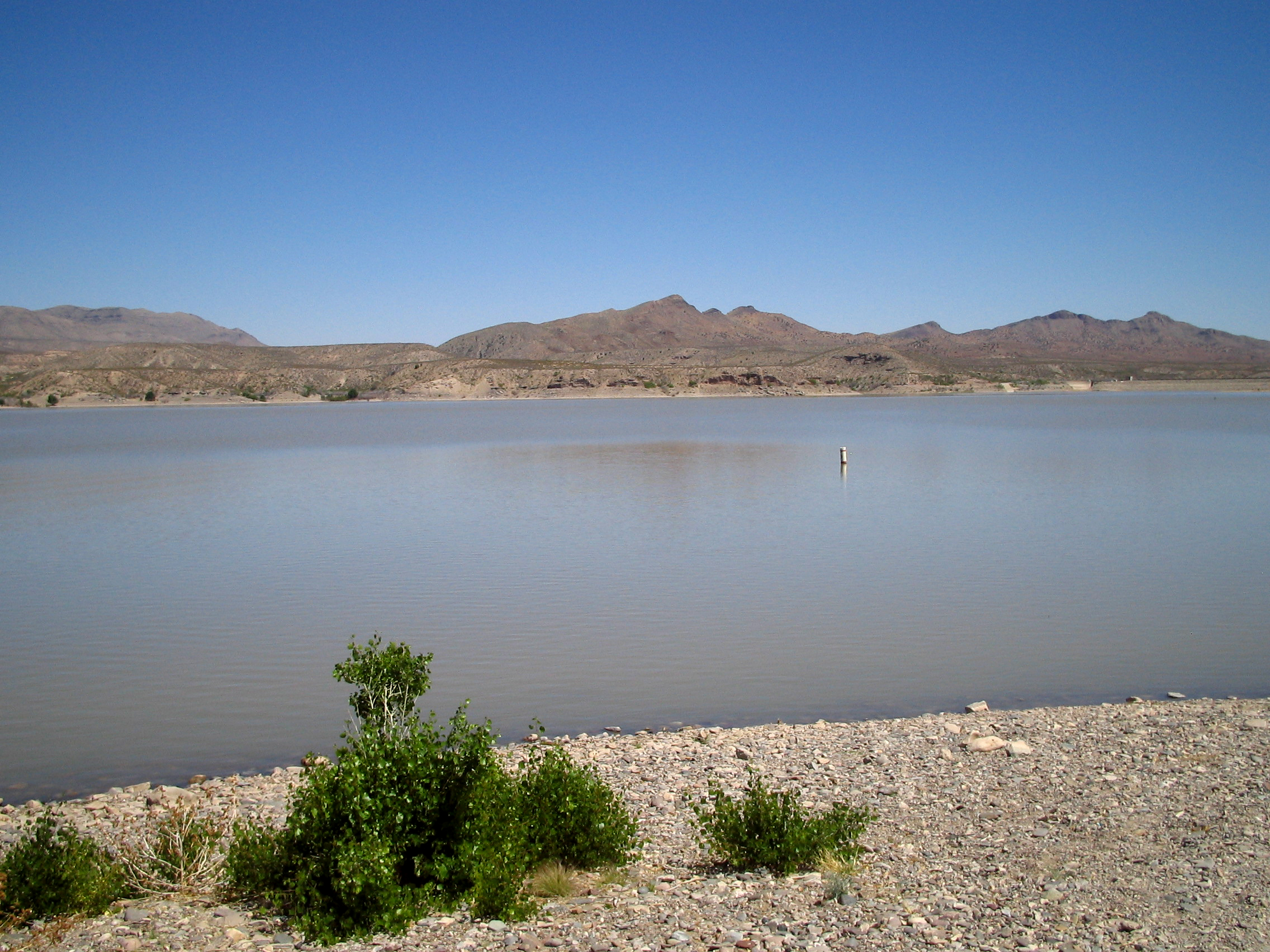
- Caballo Lake

- Location within New Mexico
- Interactive map of Caballo Lake State Park
- Location: Sierra County, New Mexico, United States
- Coordinates: 32°59′47″N 107°17′13″W
- Area: 5,384 acres (2,179 ha)
- Elevation: 4,447 ft (1,355 m)
- Established: 1964
- Administrator: New Mexico State Parks Division
- Website: Official website

Caballo Lake State Park is a state park of New Mexico, United States, located 16 miles (26 km) south of Truth or Consequences on the Rio Grande. Caballo Lake was created in the 1930s when the Caballo Dam was built across the Rio Grande. The dam is 96 feet (29 m) tall and 4,558 feet (1,389 m) across. The size of the lake varies by season, but when the lake is full, it is over 11,500 acres (47 km^{2}) in area, and 18 miles (29 km) long, making it New Mexico's third largest lake.

The primary attraction of the lake is fishing, with bass and walleye fishing most popular.
