= New Mexico State Road 166 =

State highway in New Mexico, United States

State Road 166
- NM 166 highlighted in red

Route information
- Maintained by NMDOT
- Length: 1.9 mi (3.1 km)

Major junctions
- West end: End of route near Datil
- East end: NM 52 near Datil

Location
- Country: United States
- State: New Mexico
- Counties: Socorro

Highway system
- New Mexico State Highway System; Interstate; US; State; Scenic
← NM 165	→ NM 167

State Road 166 (NM 166) is a 1.9-mile-long (3.1 km) state highway in Socorro County, New Mexico, United States. NM 166's western terminus is at the end of route east-southeast of Datil, and the eastern terminus is at NM 52 east-southeast of Datil. It runs along a portion of a former alignment of U.S. Route 60 and serves the visitor center of the Very Large Array astronomical observatory.

== Major intersections ==
The entire route is in Socorro County.

Location	mi	km	Destinations	Notes
	0.000	0.000	NM 52	Eastern terminus
	1.900	3.058	End of route	Western terminus
1.000 mi = 1.609 km; 1.000 km = 0.621 mi
