= Hermosa, New Mexico =

Coordinates: 33°09′27″N 107°43′48″W

Hermosa is recognized as a populated place in Sierra County, New Mexico, United States. It is located in the Palomas Creek valley, west of Truth or Consequences.

The townsite of Hermosa was founded in 1883 by miners, among them J.C. Plemmons, and grew to a town that had its own literary society. Plemmons established the first residence and mercantile along the southern fork of the Palomas Creek, where he positioned his cattle. He was most likely drawn to the area due to the presence of the Palomas mining camp, recognizing the possibility for a town.

In 1889, Hermosa was hit by a devastating flash flood and never recovered. No lives were lost, although the hotel was flooded. The mining town continued its operations until 1893 when the price of silver dropped precipitously, owing to the Sherman Silver Act of 1890. While other towns in the surrounding area had more diversified business ventures, Hermosa relied entirely on mining. Stubbornly, the silver miners continued their efforts for the next few years, but in 1898, another flood event from early July monsoons hit the town, and this time, Hermosa could not recover.

By 1940, there was no census for the ghost town. It was absorbed by the 168,000-acre Ladder Ranch, which in 1960 was purchased by oil executive Robert Orville Anderson. Anderson, fond of the old West aesthetic restored the hotel, dubbing it "The Hermosa Hilton," and also restored the mercantile. All that remained of the town was the mercantile, the hotel, a small log cabin post office, and a historic barn.

The media mogul Ted Turner acquired the townsite in 1992 and incorporated it into Ted Turner Reserves' Ladder Ranch, as "an opportunity to preserve the land and its inhabitants" (taken from Ted Turner Reserves Southern Properties Guide).

The property is now home to numerous conservation initiatives, stemming from the site's use by field biologists from Furman University. Led by Furman professor of biology Dr. Travis Perry, the property's focus on conservation took shape beginning in 2005, when it became a base of operations for Furman University's "Wild Semester," a 16-week, 4-course study away program.

Following from this work, the Ladder Ranch sold the townsite to the nonprofit organization founded by Dr. Perry, Natural Curiosity, whose stated mission is "furthering conservation through education, research, and edu-tourism." The nonprofit went on to found the Hermosa Field Station at the site of the old ghost town in 2023. The organization's properties include the 54-acre historic townsite of Hermosa, the nearby Hermosa Cemetery, and the 40-acre Kelsey Property, a historic homestead located approximately 10 miles south of Hermosa along Animas Creek. As part of the Hermosa sale agreement and to protect the land in perpetuity, the former landowners Turner Ranch Properties, L.P. and Hermosa Partnership required the property to be put under a Conservation Easement within 18 months of the sale. In 2024, Natural Curiosity placed a conservation easement on both the Hermosa and the Kesley properties through the New Mexico Land Conservancy land trust.
