= White Elephant (Shahnameh) =

Animal in the Shahnameh

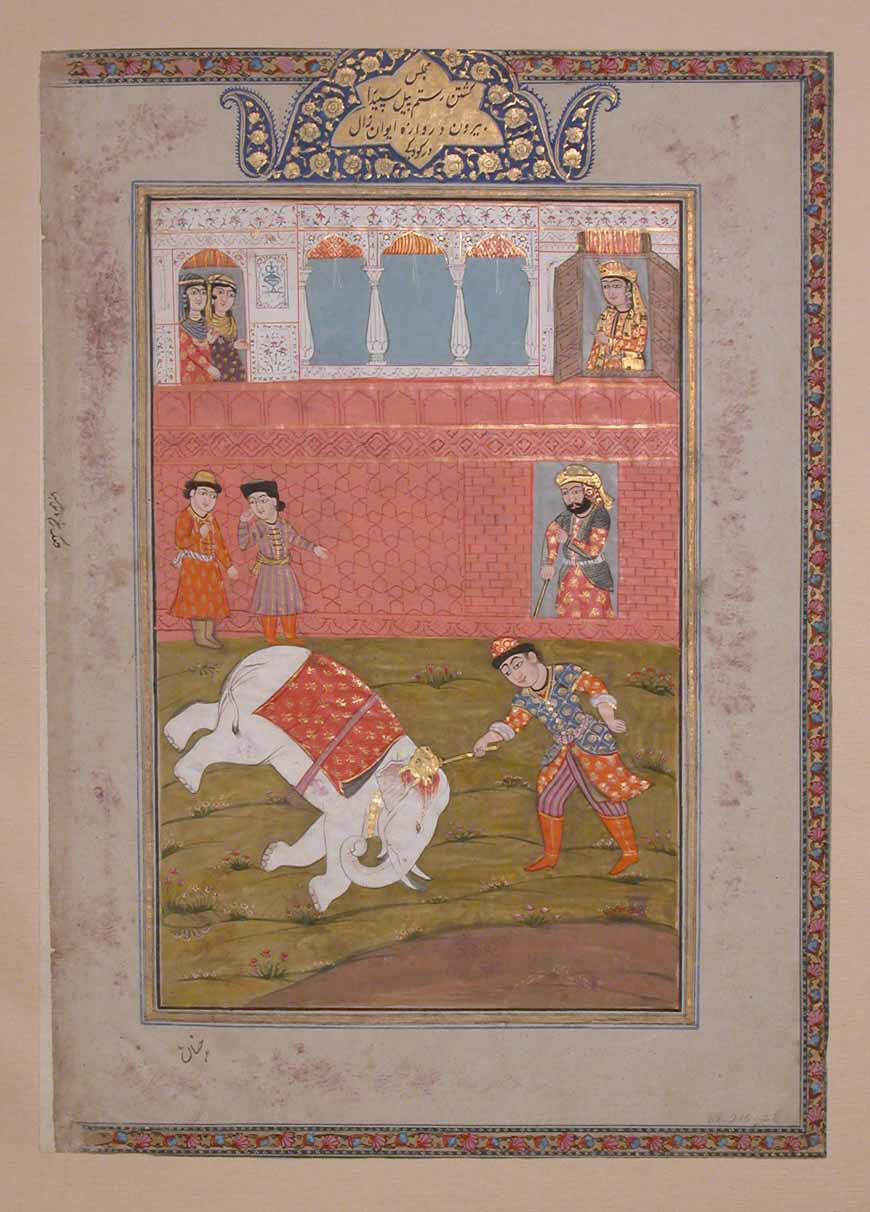
- Rostam Slays the White Elephant

Animals of the Shahnameh

White Elephant (Persian: فیل‌ سفید) was mentioned in the Shahnameh at the time of Zāl and the tribe in Zablian was caring for it. At this time, Rostam was still a teenager and had not participated in any wars. Rostam's first courage was to kill the white elephant.

== Harness Break the elephant ==
One day Zāl had a party and invited all friends to the celebration. At that celebration, Zāl gave gifts to all of his friends and Gifts were distributed by teenager Rostam. The day was over and the night had come and everyone was drunk and in bed. It seemed like midnight the cries of people everywhere and people were upset.

Rostam woke up sadly and questioned the source of the noise and was told that the white elephant had been released from the dam and had harmed the people. He hurriedly picked up the Mace and came out to restrain the white elephant. The teenage Rostam has proven himself to be a gladiator by killing the white elephant, so his father persuades him to attack the White Castle and take revenge on them.

== Gallery ==
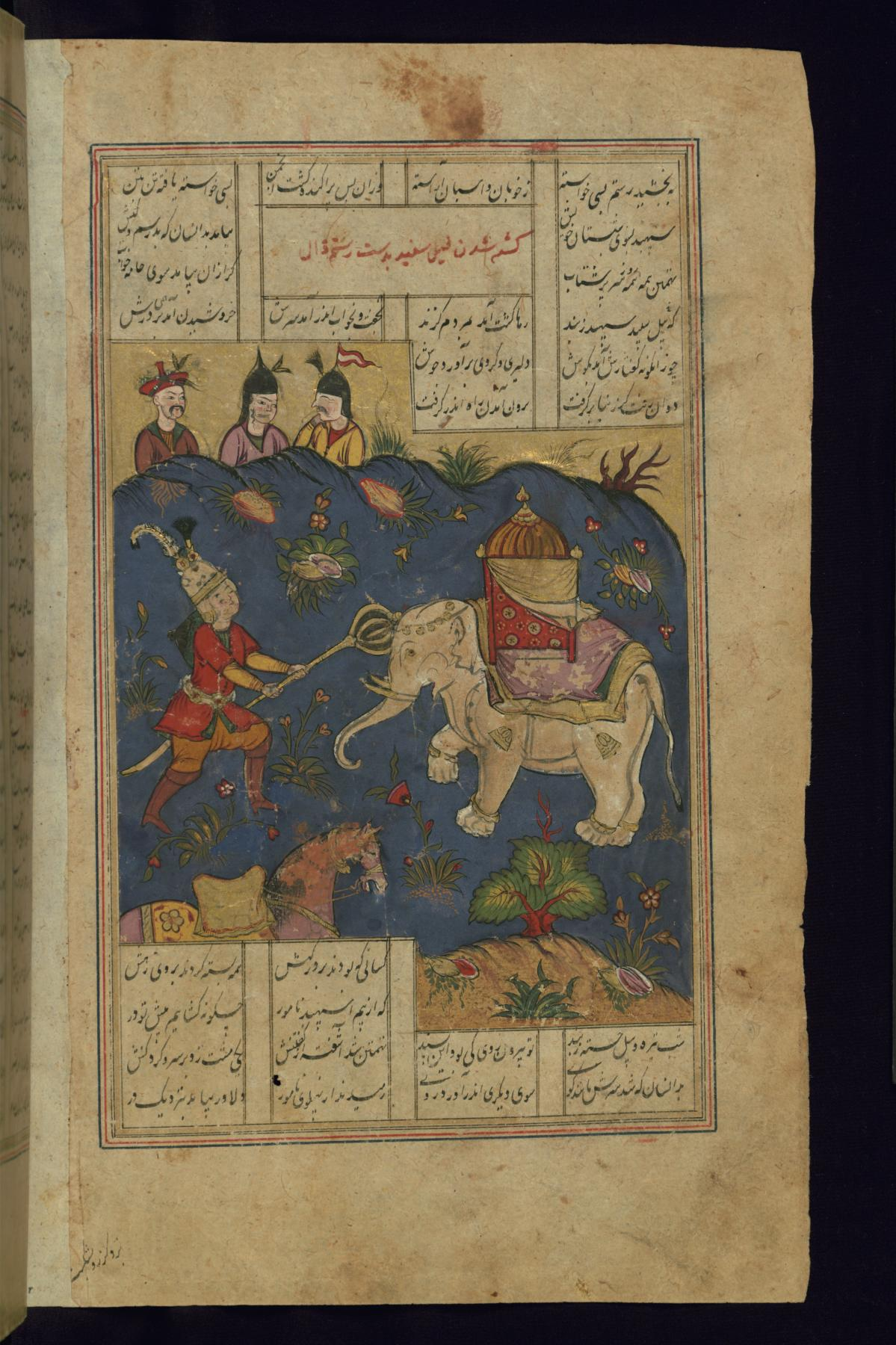
Rostam Kills the White Elephant

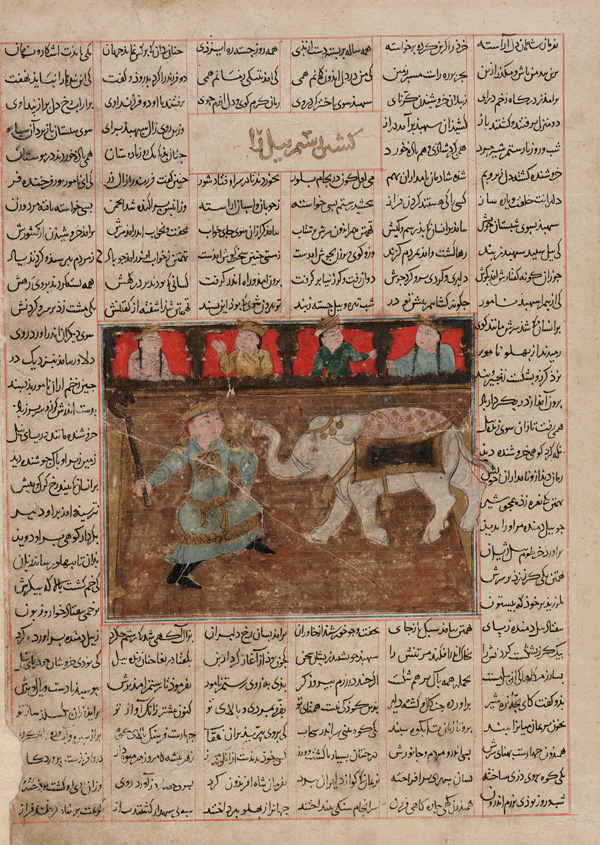
Rostam slaying the white elephant

== Sources ==
- Ferdowsi Shahnameh. From the Russian version. Mohammed Publishing. ISBN 964-5566-35-5
