= New Mexico State Road 51 =

State highway in Sierra County, New Mexico, United States

State Road 51

Route information
- Maintained by NMDOT
- Length: 17.857 mi (28.738 km)

Major junctions
- West end: I-25 BL in Truth or Consequences
- East end: County Road A013 in Engle

Location
- Country: United States
- State: New Mexico
- Counties: Sierra

Highway system
- New Mexico State Highway System; Interstate; US; State; Scenic
← NM 50	→ NM 52

State Road 51 (NM 51) is a state highway in the US state of New Mexico. Its total length is approximately 17.9 miles (28.8 km). NM 51's western terminus is at Interstate 25 Business (I-25 Bus.) in Truth or Consequences, and the eastern terminus is a continuation as County Road A013 in Engle.

== Major intersections ==
The entire route is in Sierra County.

Location	mi	km	Destinations	Notes
Truth or Consequences	0.000	0.000	I-25 BL	Western terminus
Truth or Consequences	2.480	3.991	NM 179 north	Southern terminus of NM 179
	4.325	6.960	NM 177 east	Western terminus of NM 177
	4.725	7.604	NM 177 west	Eastern terminus of NM 177
Engle	17.857	28.738	CR A013	Eastern terminus
1.000 mi = 1.609 km; 1.000 km = 0.621 mi

== See also ==
- List of state roads in New Mexico
