= Elephant Butte (Sierra County, New Mexico) =

Geographic feature in New Mexico, United States

Coordinates: 33°09′24″N 107°11′04″W

Elephant Butte is a summit that is now in the Elephant Butte Reservoir and within the Elephant Butte Lake State Park in Sierra County, New Mexico. It has an elevation of 4,639 feet (1,414 m). It was named for its shape, which is said to look like an elephant.

Originally a tall butte along the east bank of the Rio Grande, Elephant Butte became an island in Elephant Butte Reservoir upon the completion of the Elephant Butte Dam. The recent lowering of the level of the reservoir has made it a peninsula. A nearly-complete 3-million-year-old stegomastodon fossil was discovered at Elephant Butte by campers on June 9, 2014.

== See also ==
- Cabezon Peak
- Devils Tower
- Shiprock
