= Winston, New Mexico =

- Census-designated place
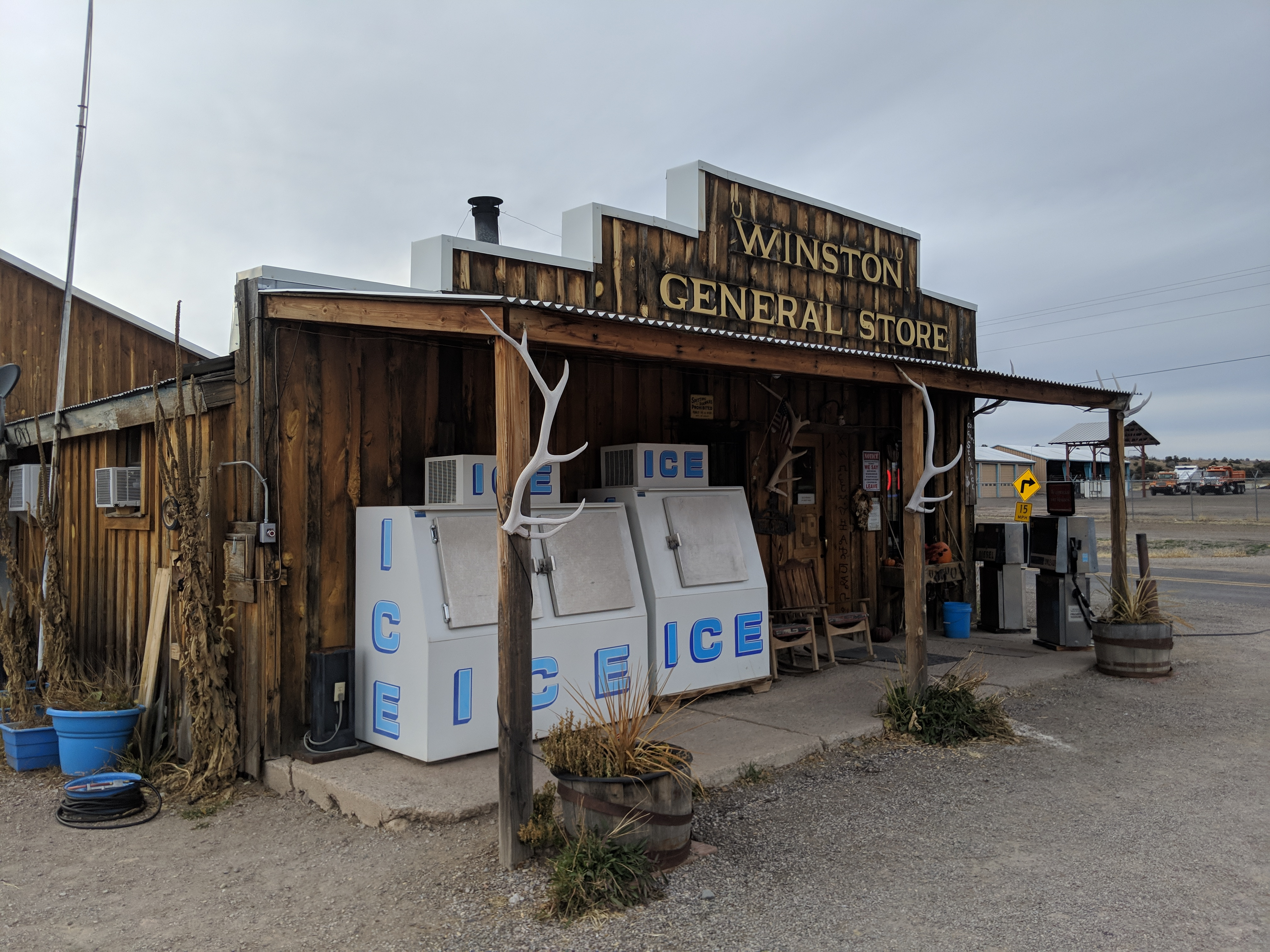
- Winston General Store

- Location within New Mexico
- Coordinates: 33°20′46″N 107°38′55″W
- Country: United States
- State: New Mexico
- County: Sierra

Area
  - Total: 0.42 sq mi (1.09 km^{2})
  - Land: 0.42 sq mi (1.09 km^{2})
  - Water: 0 sq mi (0.00 km^{2})
- Elevation: 6,175 ft (1,882 m)

Population (2020)
  - Total: 47
  - Density: 112.2/sq mi (43.31/km^{2})
- Time zone: UTC-7 (Mountain (MST))
  - Summer (DST): UTC-6 (MDT)
- ZIP code: 87943
- Area code: 575
- GNIS feature ID: 2584240

Winston is a census-designated place in Sierra County, New Mexico, United States. As of the 2020 census, Winston had a population of 47. Winston has a post office with ZIP code 87943, which opened on August 15, 1881. The community was named for Frank Winston, a pioneer miner. New Mexico State Road 52 passes through the community.

== Geography ==
According to the U.S. Census Bureau, the community has an area of 0.426 square miles (1.10 km^{2}), all land.

=== Climate ===
Climate data for Winston, New Mexico (1991–2020)
Month	Jan	Feb	Mar	Apr	May	Jun	Jul	Aug	Sep	Oct	Nov	Dec	Year
Mean daily maximum °F (°C)	52.9 (11.6)	56.6 (13.7)	63.5 (17.5)	71.0 (21.7)	79.4 (26.3)	88.7 (31.5)	86.7 (30.4)	83.8 (28.8)	79.3 (26.3)	70.9 (21.6)	60.0 (15.6)	51.6 (10.9)	70.4 (21.3)
Daily mean °F (°C)	36.3 (2.4)	39.7 (4.3)	45.4 (7.4)	52.3 (11.3)	60.1 (15.6)	69.3 (20.7)	71.2 (21.8)	68.8 (20.4)	62.9 (17.2)	53.0 (11.7)	42.6 (5.9)	35.5 (1.9)	53.1 (11.7)
Mean daily minimum °F (°C)	19.7 (−6.8)	22.7 (−5.2)	27.3 (−2.6)	33.6 (0.9)	40.9 (4.9)	49.9 (9.9)	55.8 (13.2)	53.8 (12.1)	46.5 (8.1)	35.0 (1.7)	25.1 (−3.8)	19.4 (−7.0)	35.8 (2.1)
Average precipitation inches (mm)	0.53 (13)	0.39 (9.9)	0.39 (9.9)	0.30 (7.6)	0.57 (14)	0.76 (19)	2.93 (74)	3.72 (94)	1.76 (45)	1.04 (26)	0.74 (19)	0.75 (19)	13.88 (350.4)
Average snowfall inches (cm)	3.1 (7.9)	1.1 (2.8)	1.2 (3.0)	0.0 (0.0)	0.0 (0.0)	0.0 (0.0)	0.0 (0.0)	0.0 (0.0)	0.0 (0.0)	0.6 (1.5)	0.4 (1.0)	3.2 (8.1)	9.6 (24.3)
Source: NOAA

== Demographics ==
Historical population
Census	Pop.	Note	%±
2020	47		—
U.S. Decennial Census

== Education ==
Truth or Consequences Municipal Schools is the school district for the entire county. Truth or Consequences Middle School and Hot Springs High School, both in Truth or Consequences, are the district's secondary schools.
