= White Elephant Butte =

Mountain in Nevada, United States

Coordinates: 41°54′16″N 115°04′04″W

White Elephant Butte is a summit in the U.S. state of Nevada. The elevation is 8,445 feet (2,574 m).

White Elephant Butte was so named on account of the summit's color and outline.
