= Caballo Lake =

Reservoir in New Mexico, United States

Caballo Reservoir
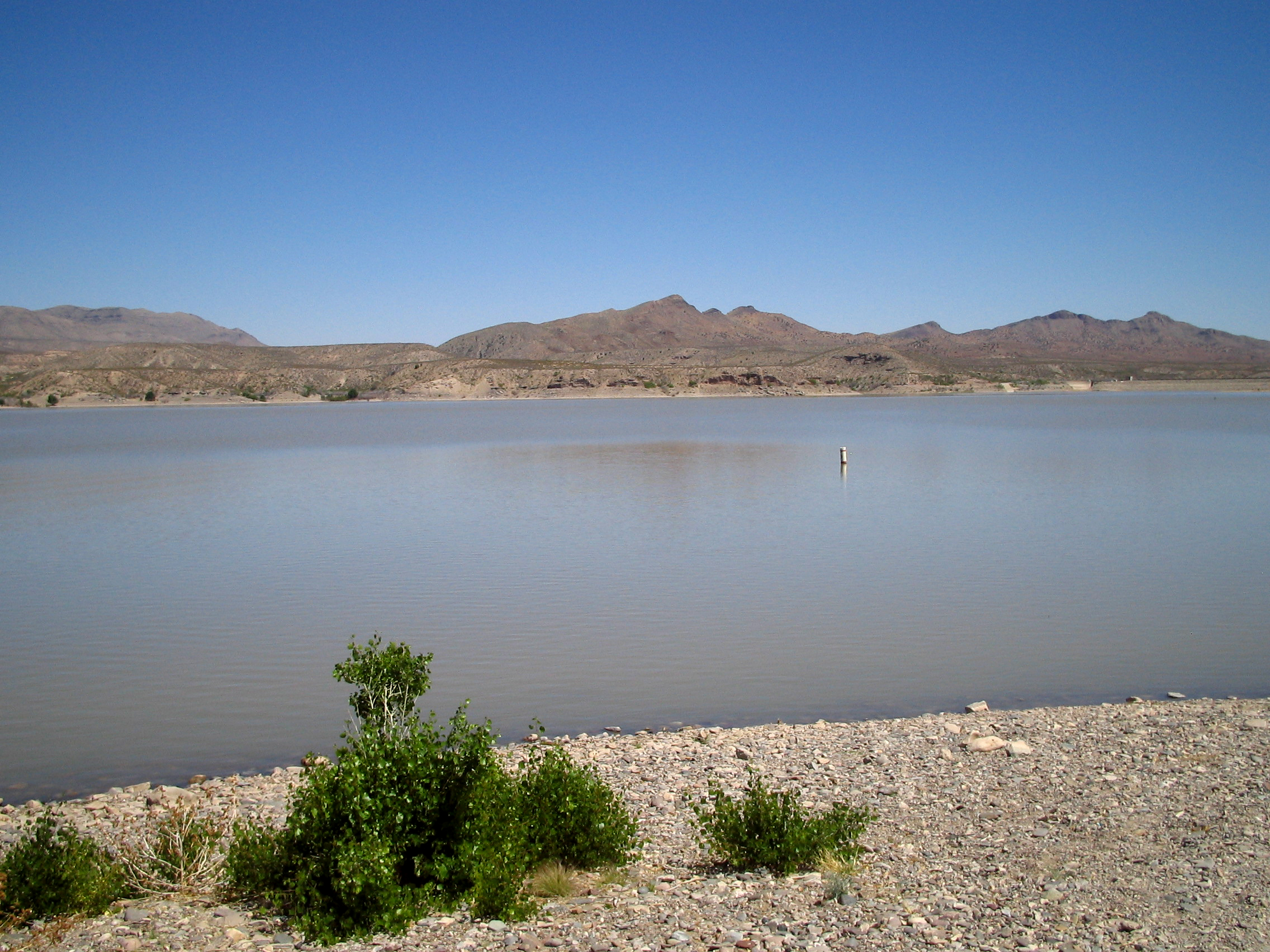

- Location within New Mexico Location within the United States
- Location: Sierra County, New Mexico
- Coordinates: 32.92568°N 107.2961°W
- Type: reservoir
- Catchment area: 79,574 km^{2} (30,724 sq mi)
- Basin countries: United States
- Surface area: 11,000 acres (4,500 ha)
- Average depth: 7 m (23 ft)
- Water volume: 428×10^{6} m^{3} (347,000 acre⋅ft)
- Surface elevation: 4,204 ft (1,281 m)

Caballo Lake is a reservoir on the Rio Grande created by the Caballo Dam in southern New Mexico, United States. It is the fourth largest reservoir in New Mexico in terms of surface area and the fifth largest body of water in New Mexico in terms of volume. The lake is in Caballo Lake State Park, which is approximately 16 miles (26 km) south of Truth or Consequences.

The lake is used for recreational activities, such as boating, swimming, waterskiing, and fishing. Fish in the lake include walleye, bass, catfish, crappie, and bluegill.

Caballo Lake is also a birdwatching site. Many migratory birds use the lake as a rest stop during their travels, and eagles are often seen in the area.

Caballo Lake is named for the Caballo Mountains that border the lake to the northeast, east, and southeast, in which wild horses roamed; Caballo means "horse" in Spanish. The upper area of the lake is very shallow and, in times of low water, has been blocked from the lower, deeper end of the lake. The water has a slightly brownish hue from a distance, due to the shallow waters (usually about 75 feet (23 m) at the deepest point). The beaches of Caballo are rocky when compared to Elephant Butte Reservoir, but there are many sandy areas. Beware of the whirlpool at the dam, as it can be a hazard.
