= Elephant Butte, New Mexico =

City in Sierra County, New Mexico, United States

- City
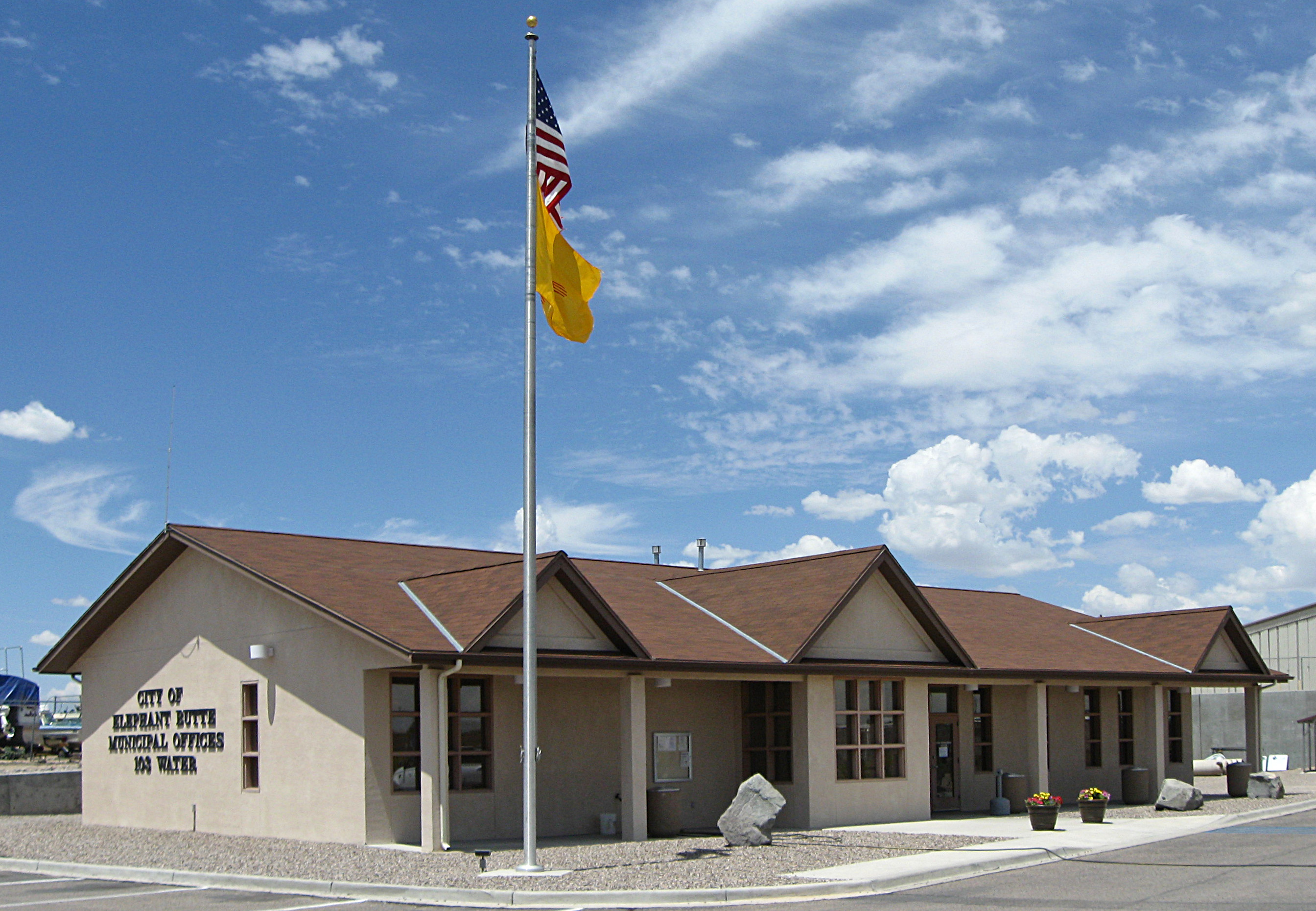
- Elephant Butte Municipal Offices

- Location of Elephant Butte, New Mexico

- Location in the United States
- Coordinates: 33°10′50″N 107°13′37″W
- Country: United States
- State: New Mexico
- County: Sierra

Government
  - City manager: John Mascaro
  - Mayor: Phillip Mortensen

Area
  - Total: 4.19 sq mi (10.85 km^{2})
  - Land: 4.18 sq mi (10.82 km^{2})
  - Water: 0.012 sq mi (0.03 km^{2})
- Elevation: 4,495 ft (1,370 m)

Population (2020)
  - Total: 1,447
  - Density: 346.3/sq mi (133.69/km^{2})
- Time zone: UTC-7 (Mountain (MST))
  - Summer (DST): UTC-6 (MDT)
- ZIP code: 87935
- Area code: 575
- FIPS code: 35-22720
- GNIS feature ID: 2410420
- Website: http://cityofelephantbutte.com/

Elephant Butte is a city in Sierra County, New Mexico, United States, located near Elephant Butte Reservoir and Elephant Butte Lake State Park. The population was 1,447 at the time of the 2020 census.

== History ==
Elephant Butte was named from Elephant Butte, a butte nearby thought to resemble an elephant.

== Geography ==
According to the United States Census Bureau, the city has a total area of 3.0 square miles (7.8 km^{2}), all land.

== Government ==
As of July 2026, the current Mayor of Elephant Butte is Richard Holcomb, while David Smith serves as City Manager.

== Demographics ==
Historical population
Census	Pop.	Note	%±
2000	1,390		—
2010	1,431		2.9%
2020	1,447		1.1%
U.S. Decennial Census

At the 2010 census, there were 1,431 people in 772 households, including 464 families, in the city. The population density was 477.0 people per square mile. There were 1,316 housing units at an average density of 438.7 per square mile. The racial makeup of the city was 92.2% White, 0.3% African American, 0.9% Native American, 0.5% Asian, 2.9% from other races, and 3.2% from two or more races. Hispanic or Latino of any race were 13.6%.

Of the 772 households 7.8% had children under the age of 18 living with them, 53.4% were married couples living together, 4.3% had a female householder with no husband present, and 39.9% were non-families. 9.3% of households had individuals under 18 years and 56.0% had individuals age 65 or older. The average household size was 1.85 and the average family size was 2.31.

The age distribution was 8.7% under the age of 18 and 43% 65 or older. The median age was 62.8 years. For every 100 females, there were 102.2 males.

As of the 2000 census, the median household income was $31,705, and the median family income was $37,344. Males had a median income of $30,809 versus $22,125 for females. The per capita income for the city was $21,345. About 7.4% of families and 10.6% of the population were below the poverty line, including 26.4% of those under age 18 and 5.2% of those age 65 or over.

== Education ==
Truth or Consequences Municipal Schools is the school district for the entire county. Truth or Consequences Middle School and Hot Springs High School, both in Truth or Consequences, are the district's secondary schools.

== Notable people ==
- Crystal Diamond, member of the New Mexico Senate since 2021
- David Parker Ray, kidnapper, torturer, rapist and suspected serial killer

== See also ==
- List of municipalities in New Mexico
- Cibola National Forest
- Apache Kid Wilderness
- Fort McRae
