= New Mexico State Road 52 =

State highway in New Mexico, United States

State Road 52
- NM 52 highlighted in red

Route information
- Maintained by NMDOT
- Length: 88.596 mi (142.581 km)

Major junctions
- South end: NM 181 near Truth or Consequences
- NM 59 near Winston
- North end: US 60 near Magdalena

Location
- Country: United States
- State: New Mexico

Highway system
- New Mexico State Highway System; Interstate; US; State; Scenic
← NM 51	→ NM 53

New Mexico State Road 52 (NM 52) is an approximately 88.6 mi (142.6 km) long state highway in Socorro County in the state of New Mexico. It runs approximately north–south. Its northern terminus is near the Very Large Array at U.S. Route 60 (US 60) between the towns of Magdalena to the east and Datil to the west. For much of its length, it is running west of the two southern sections of the Magdalena District of Cibola National Forest, as well as running east of Gila National Forest. For approximately 30 miles or so nearest to its southern terminus, it runs east from Winston, NM. Its southern terminus is in Truth or Consequences at NM 181. For the two miles nearest to the southern terminus, the road is also designated NM 181 (near the Truth or Consequences Municipal Airport). It is a paved 2 lane road north to the NM 59 junction and is graded dirt road for approximately 40–45 miles from near the junction of NM 59 to the VLA.

== Major intersections ==
County	Location	mi	km	Destinations	Notes
Sierra		0.000	0.000	NM 181	Southern terminus
Sierra		2.000	3.219	NM 142 north	Southern terminus of NM 142
Sierra		38.215	61.501	NM 59 west	Eastern terminus of NM 59
Socorro		67.115	108.011	NM 163 south	Northern terminus of NM 163
Socorro		86.115	138.589	NM 166 west	Eastern terminus of NM 166
Socorro		88.596	142.581	US 60	Northern terminus
1.000 mi = 1.609 km; 1.000 km = 0.621 mi
