= Elephant Butte Lake State Park =

State park in Sierra County, New Mexico, United States

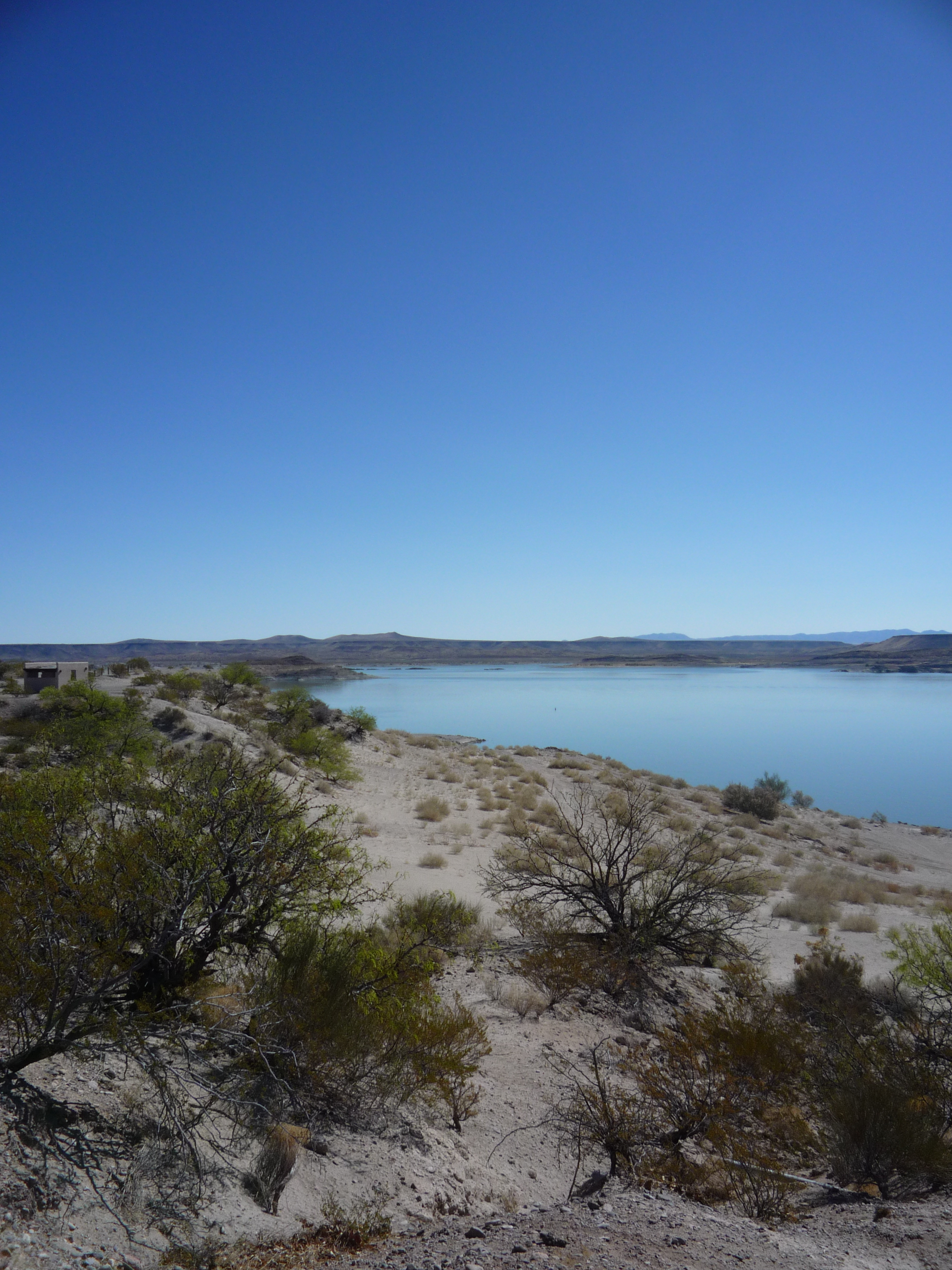
- Elephant Butte Reservoir from Elephant Butte Lake State Park, April 2011

- Location within New Mexico
- Location: Sierra County, New Mexico, United States
- Coordinates: 33°11′00″N 107°12′30″W
- Area: 24,500 acres (9,900 ha)
- Elevation: 4,527 ft (1,380 m)
- Established: 1964
- Administrator: New Mexico State Parks Division
- Website: Official website

Elephant Butte Lake State Park is a state park of New Mexico, United States, located 7 miles (11 km) north of Truth or Consequences along the shore of Elephant Butte Reservoir in Sierra County. The park is the largest state park in New Mexico and surrounds the state's largest reservoir. The 36,000-acre (150 km^{2}) reservoir, created in 1916 across the Rio Grande, is 40 miles (64 km) long with more than 200 miles (320 km) of shoreline. "The dam serves as a way to ease flooding, control irrigation and provide electricity."

== Description ==
Elephant Butte Dam is named after a rock formation resembling an elephant. Crews began construction on the dam in 1911 and ended in 1916. "[This] was a major engineering feat in its day.... The enormous concrete dam is the major feature of the Elephant Butte National Register Historic District. New Mexico State Parks operates a visitor center that contains information on the construction of the dam." The visitor center received a major upgrade in 2024. There are 3 developed camps on the lake, with over 200 camping and picnicking sites, concession-operated marinas, and stores. Recreation at Elephant Butte Reservoir is managed by the New Mexico State Parks under agreement with the United States Bureau of Reclamation.

== History ==
"Talk of a dam began in the 1880s after farmers in southern New Mexico, Texas and Mexico began to complain that they were not receiving their fair share of water. A legal battle over the water and where the dam should be built delayed its construction.... The dam would get a few more names before the elephant took up permanent residence."

"In the late 1800s, local newspapers were already referring to the area where the dam would eventually be built as Elephant Butte...." "Upper Town was designated for what was considered the higher class and more skilled workers, including engineers and supervisors. [There] was further segregat[ion] with Mexicans and Americans separated into different areas."

A stegomastodon fossil was discovered at the park in June 2014.

== See also ==
- List of New Mexico state parks
