= Sierra County, New Mexico =

County in New Mexico, United States

- County
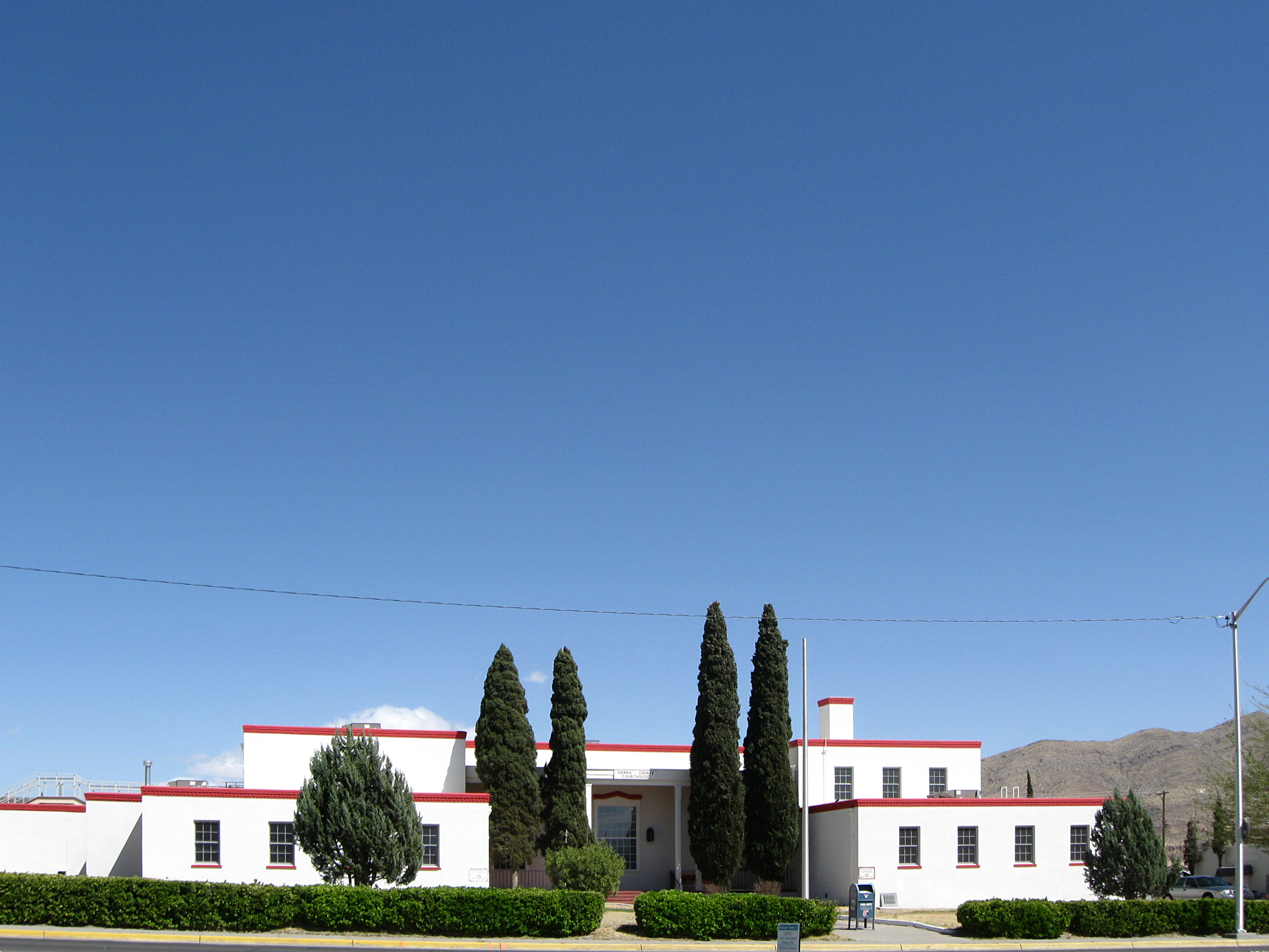
- Sierra County Courthouse in Truth or Consequences

- Seal

- Location within the U.S. state of New Mexico
- Coordinates: 33°08′N 107°11′W
- Country: United States
- State: New Mexico
- Founded: 1884
- Named for: the Black Range (Spanish: Sierra Diablo
- Seat: Truth or Consequences
- Largest city: Truth or Consequences

Area
  - Total: 4,236 sq mi (10,970 km^{2})
  - Land: 4,179 sq mi (10,820 km^{2})
  - Water: 57 sq mi (150 km^{2}) 1.4%

Population (2020)
  - Total: 11,576
  - Estimate (2025): 11,395 ▼
  - Density: 2.770/sq mi (1.070/km^{2})
- Time zone: UTC−7 (Mountain)
  - Summer (DST): UTC−6 (MDT)
- Congressional district: 2nd
- Website: sierraco.org

Sierra County (Spanish: Condado de Sierra) is a county located in the U.S. state of New Mexico. As of the 2020 Census, the population was 11,576. Its county seat is Truth or Consequences.

== Geography ==
According to the U.S. Census Bureau, the county has a total area of 4,236 square miles (10,970 km^{2}), of which 4,179 square miles (10,820 km^{2}) is land and 57 square miles (150 km^{2}) (1.4%) is water.

=== Adjacent counties ===
- Catron County - northwest
- Socorro County - north
- Lincoln County - northeast
- Otero County - east
- Doña Ana County - south
- Luna County - south
- Grant County - west

=== National protected areas ===
- Cibola National Forest (part)
- El Camino Real de Tierra Adentro National Historic Trail (part)
- Gila National Forest (part)

=== Major highways ===
- I-25 / US 85 (unsigned)
  - I-25 BL (Truth or Consequences)
- NM 1
- NM 27
- NM 51
- NM 52
- NM 59
- NM 142
- NM 152
- NM 181
- NM 179
- NM 187
- NM 195
- NM 390

== Demographics ==
Historical population
Census	Pop.	Note	%±
1890	3,630		—
1900	3,158		−13.0%
1910	3,536		12.0%
1920	4,619		30.6%
1930	5,184		12.2%
1940	6,962		34.3%
1950	7,186		3.2%
1960	6,409		−10.8%
1970	7,189		12.2%
1980	8,454		17.6%
1990	9,912		17.2%
2000	13,270		33.9%
2010	11,988		−9.7%
2020	11,576		−3.4%
2025 (est.)	11,395	▼	−1.6%
U.S. Decennial Census; 1790-1960 1900-1990; 1990-2000 2010-2016

=== 2020 census ===
As of the 2020 census, the county had a population of 11,576. The median age was 57.3 years. 15.4% of residents were under the age of 18 and 35.9% of residents were 65 years of age or older. For every 100 females there were 99.8 males, and for every 100 females age 18 and over there were 98.0 males age 18 and over.

Sierra County, New Mexico – Racial and ethnic composition Note: the US Census treats Hispanic/Latino as an ethnic category. This table excludes Latinos from the racial categories and assigns them to a separate category. Hispanics/Latinos may be of any race.
Race / Ethnicity (NH = Non-Hispanic)	Pop 2000	Pop 2010	Pop 2020	% 2000	% 2010	% 2020
White alone (NH)	9,356	8,205	7,507	70.50%	68.44%	64.85%
Black or African American alone (NH)	55	44	70	0.41%	0.37%	0.60%
Native American or Alaska Native alone (NH)	162	130	106	1.22%	1.08%	0.92%
Asian alone (NH)	23	49	119	0.17%	0.41%	1.03%
Pacific Islander alone (NH)	8	2	3	0.06%	0.02%	0.03%
Other race alone (NH)	14	14	31	0.11%	0.12%	0.27%
Mixed race or Multiracial (NH)	164	192	429	1.24%	1.60%	3.71%
Hispanic or Latino (any race)	3,488	3,352	3,311	26.28%	27.96%	28.60%
Total	13,270	11,988	11,576	100.00%	100.00%	100.00%

The racial makeup of the county was 76.1% White, 0.8% Black or African American, 2.1% American Indian and Alaska Native, 1.1% Asian, 0.0% Native Hawaiian and Pacific Islander, 7.4% from some other race, and 12.5% from two or more races. Hispanic or Latino residents of any race comprised 28.6% of the population.

66.6% of residents lived in urban areas, while 33.4% lived in rural areas.

There were 5,741 households in the county, of which 17.4% had children under the age of 18 living with them and 30.1% had a female householder with no spouse or partner present. About 42.1% of all households were made up of individuals and 24.8% had someone living alone who was 65 years of age or older.

There were 8,056 housing units, of which 28.7% were vacant. Among occupied housing units, 71.6% were owner-occupied and 28.4% were renter-occupied. The homeowner vacancy rate was 2.9% and the rental vacancy rate was 15.9%.

=== 2010 census ===
As of the 2010 census, there were 11,988 people, 5,917 households, and 3,126 families living in the county. The population density was 2.9 inhabitants per square mile (1.1 inhabitants/km^{2}). There were 8,356 housing units at an average density of 2.0 units per square mile (0.77 units/km^{2}).

The racial makeup of the county was 85.6% white, 1.7% American Indian, 0.4% black or African American, 0.4% Asian, 8.6% from other races, and 3.3% from two or more races. Those of Hispanic or Latino origin made up 28.0% of the population. In terms of ancestry, 14.0% were German, 9.4% were American, 8.4% were English, and 8.0% were Irish.

Of the 5,917 households, 17.8% had children under the age of 18 living with them, 40.0% were married couples living together, 8.9% had a female householder with no husband present, 47.2% were non-families, and 40.8% of all households were made up of individuals. The average household size was 1.98 and the average family size was 2.64. The median age was 54.5 years.

The median income for a household in the county was $25,583, the lowest of any county in New Mexico. The median income for a family was $38,641. Males had a median income of $32,059 versus $26,213 for females. The per capita income for the county was $16,667. About 15.6% of families and 22.5% of the population were below the poverty line, including 29.8% of those under age 18 and 12.9% of those age 65 or over.

=== 2000 census ===
As of the 2000 census, there were 13,270 people, 6,113 households, and 3,618 families living in the county. The population density was 3 people per square mile (1.2 people/km^{2}). There were 8,727 housing units at an average density of 2 units per square mile (0.77/km^{2}). The racial makeup of the county was 86.97% White, 0.48% Black or African American, 1.48% Native American, 0.17% Asian, 0.08% Pacific Islander, 8.27% from other races, and 2.54% from two or more races. 26.28% of the population were Hispanic or Latino of any race.

There were 6,113 households, out of which 20.40% had children under the age of 18 living with them, 47.50% were married couples living together, 8.60% had a female householder with no husband present, and 40.80% were non-families. 35.90% of all households were made up of individuals, and 19.30% had someone living alone who was 65 years of age or older. The average household size was 2.13 and the average family size was 2.75.

In the county, the population was spread out, with 20.10% under the age of 18, 5.40% from 18 to 24, 19.50% from 25 to 44, 27.40% from 45 to 64, and 27.70% who were 65 years of age or older. The median age was 49 years. For every 100 females there were 100.00 males. For every 100 females age 18 and over, there were 97.70 males.

The median income for a household in the county was $24,152, and the median income for a family was $29,787. Males had a median income of $24,570 versus $19,839 for females. The per capita income for the county was $15,023. About 13.80% of families and 20.90% of the population were below the poverty line, including 31.50% of those under age 18 and 14.70% of those age 65 or over.

== Spaceport America ==
Spaceport America is located in Sierra County, 45 miles (72 kilometers) north of Las Cruces and 30 miles (48 kilometers) east of Truth or Consequences. Sierra County voters approved the creation of a spaceport tax district in April 2008, freeing up funding for its construction. The first launch from Spaceport America occurred on September 25, 2006, since which over 300 launches have occurred. On May 22, 2021, Virgin Galactic's VSS Unity launched from the spaceport with three people aboard becoming the first crewed launch from both Spaceport America and New Mexico and making New Mexico the third U.S. state, after California and Florida, to send humans into space.

== Communities ==
=== Cities ===
- Elephant Butte
- Truth or Consequences (county seat)

=== Village ===
- Williamsburg

=== Census-designated places ===
- Arrey
- Caballo
- Hillsboro
- Hot Springs Landing
- Kingston
- Las Palomas
- Oasis
- Winston

=== Unincorporated communities ===
- Chloride
- Cuchillo
- Derry
- Engle
- Monticello
- Placitas
- Upham

=== Ghost towns ===
- Alamocita
- Aleman
- Chise
- Elephant Butte
- Hermosa
- Lake Valley
- San Albino
- San José
- San Ygnacio de la Alamosa
- Zapata
- San Navarro (Est: 1836 Abandoned: 1952)

== Politics ==
Sierra County was a swing county up until the 1950s, and since then it has largely voted Republican. The only Democrat since then to carry the county with a full majority was Lyndon Johnson in 1964. Bill Clinton carried the county with pluralities in 1992 and 1996, but this was largely due to unusually strong third-party performance by Ross Perot in both elections.

United States presidential election results for Sierra County, New Mexico
Year	Republican		Democratic		Third party(ies)	
Year	No.	%	No.	%	No.	%
1912	176	28.16%	352	56.32%	97	15.52%
1916	460	47.13%	493	50.51%	23	2.36%
1920	862	56.79%	642	42.29%	14	0.92%
1924	632	48.17%	546	41.62%	134	10.21%
1928	766	53.79%	657	46.14%	1	0.07%
1932	667	30.18%	1,515	68.55%	28	1.27%
1936	951	37.12%	1,587	61.94%	24	0.94%
1940	1,372	47.15%	1,534	52.71%	4	0.14%
1944	1,112	52.26%	1,008	47.37%	8	0.38%
1948	1,274	47.54%	1,389	51.83%	17	0.63%
1952	2,033	63.61%	1,158	36.23%	5	0.16%
1956	1,954	65.00%	1,035	34.43%	17	0.57%
1960	1,890	60.64%	1,220	39.14%	7	0.22%
1964	1,501	47.67%	1,633	51.86%	15	0.48%
1968	1,624	57.06%	930	32.68%	292	10.26%
1972	2,074	67.47%	934	30.38%	66	2.15%
1976	1,665	51.04%	1,564	47.95%	33	1.01%
1980	2,222	62.50%	1,169	32.88%	164	4.61%
1984	2,663	66.00%	1,335	33.09%	37	0.92%
1988	2,507	60.19%	1,595	38.30%	63	1.51%
1992	1,562	35.36%	1,771	40.09%	1,085	24.56%
1996	2,140	44.54%	2,154	44.83%	511	10.63%
2000	2,721	59.33%	1,689	36.83%	176	3.84%
2004	3,162	61.31%	1,926	37.35%	69	1.34%
2008	3,017	55.00%	2,352	42.88%	116	2.11%
2012	2,928	57.39%	1,964	38.49%	210	4.12%
2016	3,010	58.10%	1,612	31.11%	559	10.79%
2020	3,542	59.58%	2,265	38.10%	138	2.32%
2024	3,473	58.34%	2,332	39.17%	148	2.49%

== Education ==
Truth or Consequences Schools is the school district for all of the county.

== See also ==
- National Register of Historic Places listings in Sierra County, New Mexico
- South Central Regional Transit District
