= Hot Springs High School (New Mexico) =

High school in New Mexico, United States

Coordinates: 33.1472°N 107.2512°W

Hot Springs High School (often abbreviated to HSHS) is a 4-year public high school located in Truth or Consequences, New Mexico, within the Truth or Consequences Municipal Schools. Currently, the school carries about 350 students through grades 9-12. It has a student to teacher ratio of 16:1.

The boundary of the school district is all of Sierra County, and therefore the school's service area is that county. The original Hot Springs High School building was built in 1967 a new building was built in 2000 and the old building was demolished in 2025. Citizens voted to keep the name "Hot Springs" rather than changing it to match the town's name. In early 2026 a 1.5 million dollar press box and concession stand was built.

== Extracurriculars & Clubs ==
HSHS offers many extracurriculars and clubs to join.

- FFA (Future Farmers of America)
- SkillsUSA
- NHS (National Honors Society)
- Student Council
- Drama Club
- JROTC
- Band

== Hot Springs High School Sports ==
The school's sports team are named Tigers and offer many extracurricular activities.

- Football
- Volleyball
- Basketball
- Powerlifting
- Baseball
- Soccer (Co-ED)
- Softball
- Track & Field
- Tennis
- Golf
- Esports

Hot Springs High School is a 3A school.

=== State Championships ===
Hot Springs High School has won many state championships over the years. Most recently:

- 3A Boys Powerlifting SHW Champion Nick West in 2026
- 3A Girls Powerlifting 198 Champion Alexandra Gonzales in 2025
- 3A Boys Basketball State Champions in 2019 and 2021.
