= Truth or Consequences Municipal Schools =

School district in New Mexico

Truth or Consequences Municipal Schools is a school district headquartered in Truth or Consequences, New Mexico, U.S.

Its boundary is all of Sierra County.

== History ==
In 2020 Channell Segura became the superintendent.

By 2021 Segura made changes in curriculum building and allowed outside candidates to fill every principal position.

In July 2022 Segura announced she would leave her position effective August 5, 2022.

== Schools ==
Schools are in Truth or Consequences unless otherwise stated.

Secondary

- Hot Springs High School
- Truth or Consequences Middle School

Elementary

- Arrey Elementary School (Arrey)
- Sierra Elementary Complex
- Truth or Consequences Elementary School
