= Glorieta Pass Battlefield =

- U.S. National Register of Historic Places
- U.S. National Historic Landmark
- NM State Register of Cultural Properties
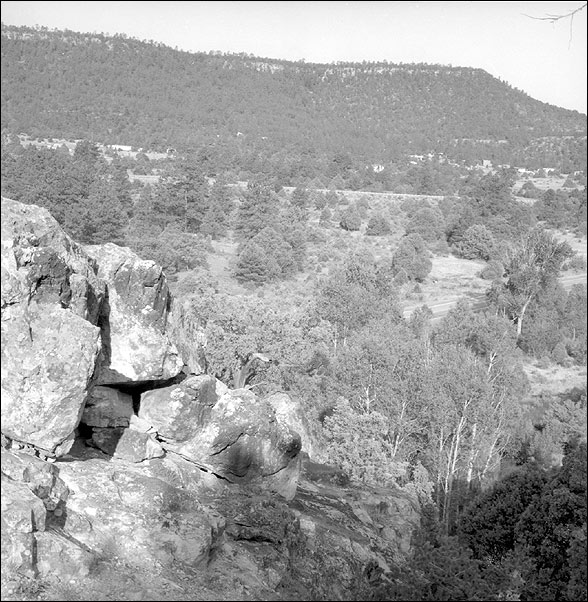
- Photo from Sharpshooter's Ridge, just north of Pigeon's Ranch. This was the location of the Union right flank during the last day's battle.

- Location within New Mexico Location within the United States
- Location: Santa Fe County, New Mexico, US
- Nearest city: Pecos, New Mexico
- Coordinates: 35°33′36″N 105°47′8″W
- Area: 444 acres (180 ha)
- Built: 1862
- Part of: Pecos National Historical Park (ID66000485)
- NRHP reference No.: 66000486
- NMSRCP No.: 49

Significant dates
- Added to NRHP: October 15, 1966
- Designated NHL: November 5, 1961
- Designated NMSRCP: May 21, 1971

The Glorieta Pass Battlefield was the site of an American Civil War battle that ended Confederate ambitions to cut off the West from the Union. The Battle of Glorieta Pass took place on March 26–28, 1862, at Glorieta Pass, on the Santa Fe Trail between the Pecos River and Santa Fe, New Mexico. The pass, and the battlefield, are now bisected by Interstate 25. Two portions of the battlefield, now publicly owned and operated by the National Park Service as part of Pecos National Historical Park, were declared a National Historic Landmark in 1961.

== Description and battle history ==
The preserved portions of the battlefield consist of two sites, a 294-acre (1.19 km^{2}) parcel on the west side of Glorieta Pass, and a 150-acre (0.61 km^{2}) parcel on the east side. Areas in between and other portions of the battlefield have been at least partially compromised by the construction of both a railroad and Interstate 25. The eastern portion is north of I-25, and is roughly bisected by New Mexico State Road 50, which follows the historic route of the Santa Fe Trail. At its eastern end is Pigeon's Ranch, a historic stop on the trail, of which only foundation remnants survive. The western section is located mainly between I-25 and the railroad tracks near the hamlet of Cañoncito.

The Battle of Glorieta Pass, fought March 26–28, 1862, arose out of a Confederate initiative to gain control of the western United States. Confederate forces under Brig. Gen. Henry H. Sibley had penetrated as far as Santa Fe, defeating a Union force under Col. Edward Canby at Valverde in February 1862. William Gilpin, governor of the Colorado Territory, raised a brigade of volunteers to aid in the defense of Fort Union, the next Confederate objective. Union sided New Mexican volunteers were led by Lt. Col. Manuel Chaves of the 2nd New Mexico Infantry. These two forces fought a largely indecisive battle, with the Union forces forced to retreat northward, but successfully destroying the Confederate supply train. The latter forced a Confederate retreat, ultimately all the way back to Texas.

== Preservation ==
In 1993, the Congressionally appointed Civil War Sites Advisory Commission issued its "Report on the Nation’s Civil War Battlefields." The Commission was tasked with identify the nation's historically significant Civil War sites, determining their importance, and providing recommendations for their preservation to Congress.

Of the roughly 10,500 actions of the U.S. Civil War, 384 (3.7%) were identified by the Commission as principal battles and rated according to their significance and threat of loss. The Battle of Glorieta Pass received the highest rating from the Commission - Priority I (Class A). Class A battlefields are principal strategic operations having a direct impact on the course of the war. With this rating the Commission placed Glorieta Pass on the same level with battles such as Gettysburg and Antietam. The Priority I rating identified Glorieta Pass as being not only one of the most important, but also one of the most highly endangered battlefields in the country. Only 10 other battlefields received the Priority I (Class A) rating. The Commission recommended that Congress focus its preservation efforts on Priority I, nationally significant battlefields.

Since 1993 portions of the Glorieta Pass battlefield have been a unit of the National Park Service. The Glorieta Pass unit (Pigeon's Ranch) comprises roughly 20% of the total battlefield. The remaining 80% is in private ownership. Glorieta Pass Battlefield is managed by Pecos National Historical Park and supported by the Glorieta Battlefield Coalition, a non-profit citizens' organization.

Portions of the battlefield have been opened to the public as of 2012 (the 150th anniversary of the battle) featuring convenient, and even some accessible, landscaped paths and interpretive signage.

The Civil War Trust (a division of the American Battlefield Trust) and its partners have acquired and preserved 19 acres (0.077 km^{2}) of the battlefield.

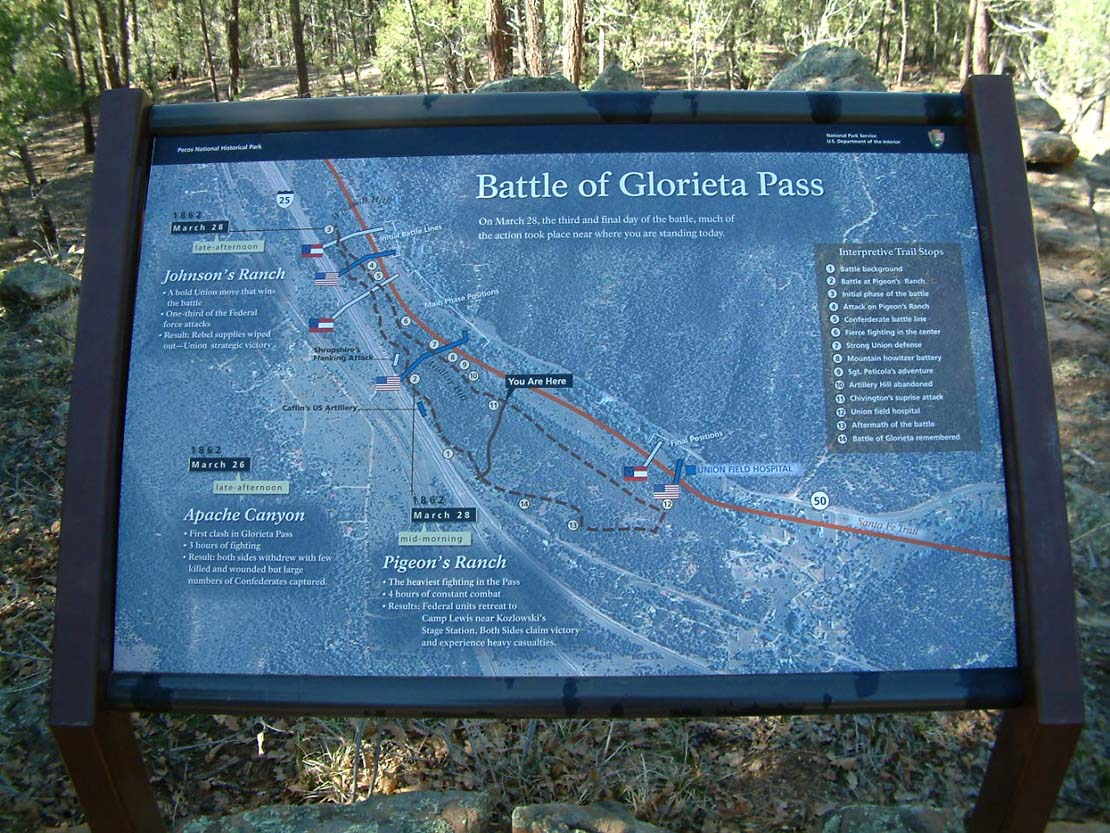

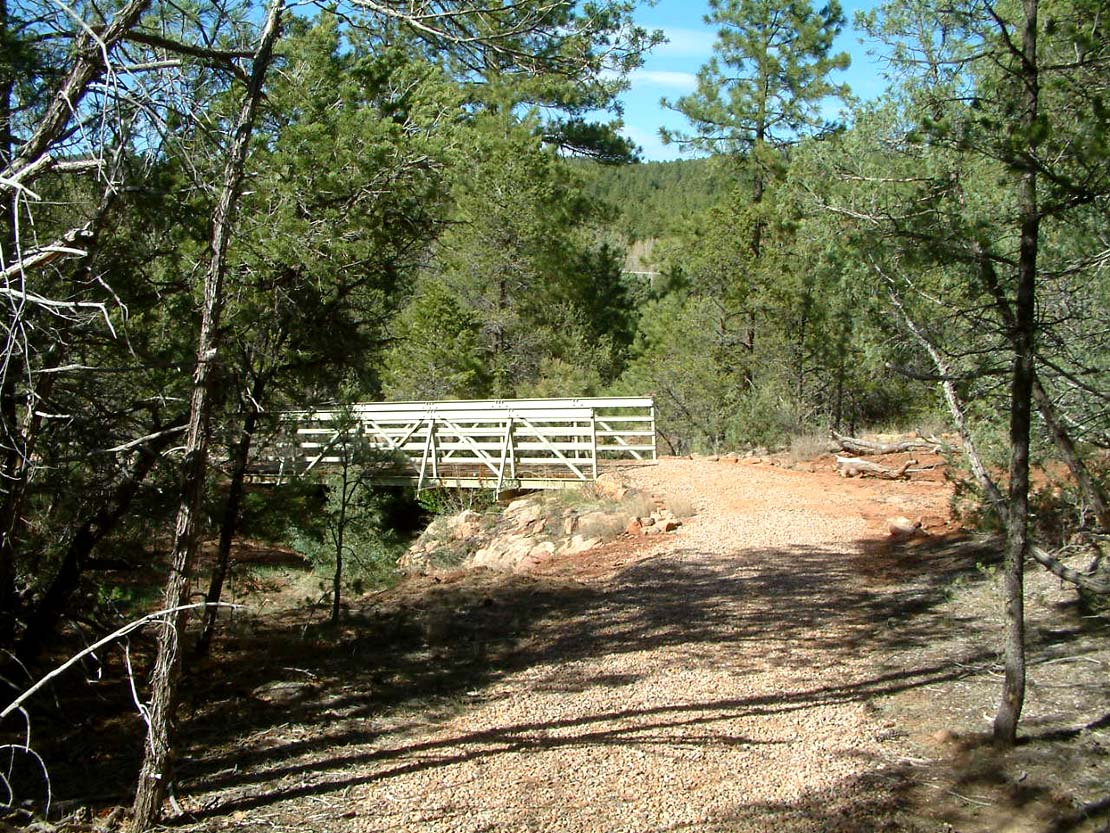

== See also ==
- National Register of Historic Places listings in San Miguel County, New Mexico
- List of National Historic Landmarks in New Mexico
