= List of frontage roads in New Mexico =

In the U.S. state of New Mexico, a frontage road is a usually unsigned, but sometimes signed, highway assigned and maintained by the New Mexico Department of Transportation (NMDOT). The majority of them are minor connectors between two signed routes. The longest frontage road is FR 2151 at 45.922 miles (73.904 km) in length.

== FR 1035 ==
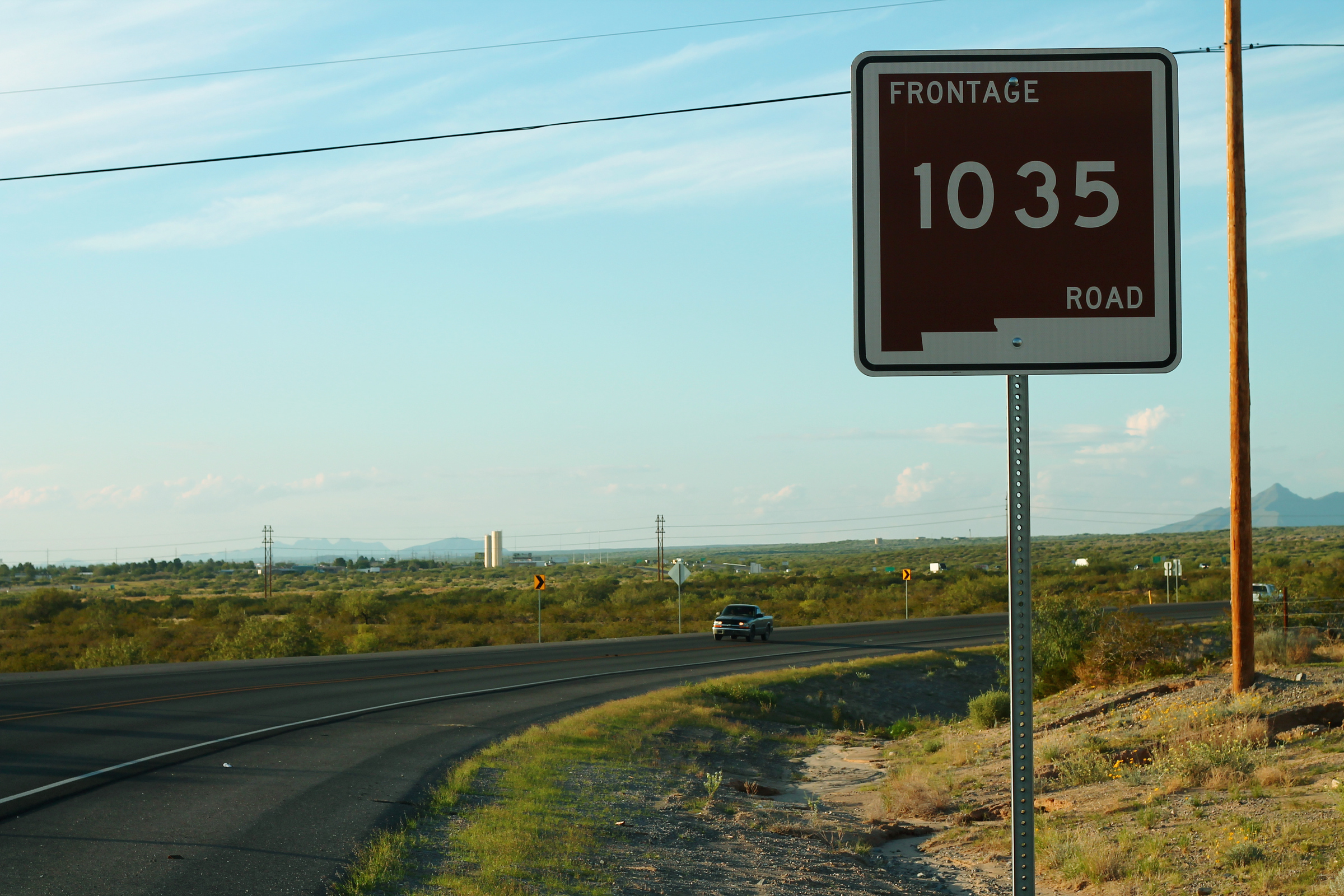
FR 1035 sign

Frontage Road 1035 is a 20.598-mile-long (33.149 km) frontage road. The highway begins at NM 404 in Anthony and heads north to a junction with Union Avenue in Mesquite. It is the fifth longest Frontage Road.

The entire route is in Doña Ana County.

Location	mi	km	Destinations	Notes
Anthony	0.000	0.000	FR 1043 south / NM 404 to I-10 (US 85 / US 180) – Chaparral	Southern terminus; road continues as FR 1043
			NM 460 south	Northern terminus of NM 460
Vado			NM 227 west (Vado Drive) / I-10 (US 85 / US 180) – Vado, El Paso, Las Cruces	Roundabout; eastern terminus of NM 227; I-10 exit 155
Mesquite			NM 228 west	Eastern terminus of NM 228
Mesquite			FR 1036 east (Cholla Road)	Western terminus of FR 1036
Mesquite	20.598	33.149	Union Avenue	Northern terminus
1.000 mi = 1.609 km; 1.000 km = 0.621 mi: Route transition

== FR 1043 ==
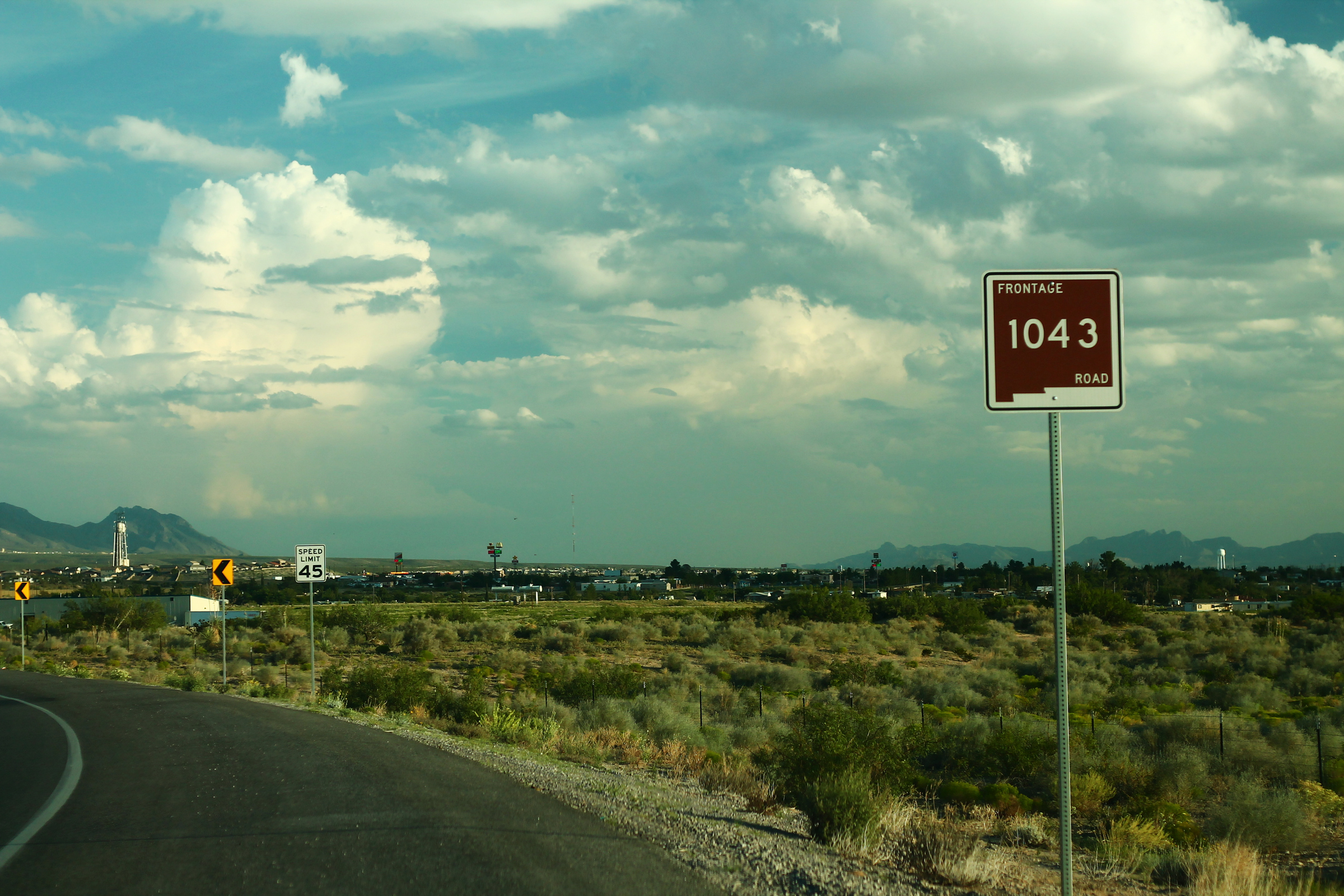
Frontage Road 1043 sign

Frontage Road 1043 is a 1.7-mile-long (2.7 km) frontage road. The highway begins at the Texas state line west of I-10 and heads north to NM 404.

The entire route is in Anthony, Doña Ana County.

mi	km	Destinations	Notes
0.00	0.00	Sandia Drive	Continuation into Anthony, Texas
1.7	2.7	NM 404 / FR 1035 north	Northern terminus; road continues as FR 1035.
1.000 mi = 1.609 km; 1.000 km = 0.621 mi: Route transition

== FR 2044 ==
Frontage Road 2044 is a 10.991-mile-long (17.688 km) frontage road. The highway begins at the former NM 408 and heads north to a junction with FR 2051 at exit 163 of Interstate 25 (I-25).

== FR 2051 ==
Frontage Road 2051 is a 1.125-mile-long (1.811 km) frontage road. The highway begins at FR 2044 at exit 163 of I-25 and heads north to the end of state maintenance.

== FR 2108 ==
Frontage Road 2108 begins at U.S. Route 285 and New Mexico State Road 300.

The entire route is in Santa Fe County.

Location	mi	km	Destinations	Notes
	0.000	0.000	NM 466; I-25 / US 84 / US 85 / US 285	I-25 Exit 290
1.000 mi = 1.609 km; 1.000 km = 0.621 mi

== FR 2115 ==
Frontage Road 2115 is a 0.330-mile-long (0.531 km) frontage road. The highway begins at FR 2116 and then intersects exit of I-25 and heads north to end at NM 63.

The entire route is in Rowe, San Miguel County.

mi	km	Destinations	Notes
0.000	0.000	FR 2116	Southern terminus
0.258	0.415	I-25 north / US 84 east / US 85 north	I-25 exit 307 northbound
0.330	0.531	NM 63 to I-25 south / US 84 west / US 85 south	Northern terminus; to I-25 exit 307 southbound via NM 63 north
1.000 mi = 1.609 km; 1.000 km = 0.621 mi

== FR 2116 ==
Frontage Road 2116 is a 34.370-mile-long (55.313 km) frontage road. FR 2116's western terminus is a continuation of Cactus Drive west of Rowe, and the eastern terminus is at Interstate 25 (I-25), U.S. Route 84 (US 84), and US 85. Along the way FR 2116 intersects NM 34 east of Rowe and then NM 3 north of Ribera. FR 2116 is the second longest frontage road.

The entire route is in San Miguel County.

Location	mi	km	Destinations	Notes
	0.000	0.000	Cactus Drive	Western terminus
Rowe			FR 2115 north to I-25 / US 84 / US 85 / NM 63	To I-25 exit 307; southern terminus of FR 2115
			NM 34 south	Northern terminus of NM 34
			FR 2120 north to FR 2121	Southern terminus of FR 2120
			FR 2122 west	Eastern terminus of FR 2122
Sands			FR 2123 east	Western terminus of FR 2123
Sands			I-25 / US 84 / US 85	I-25 exit 319
			NM 3 south to I-25 / US 84 / US 85	Northern terminus of NM 3; to I-25 exit 323
Serafina			FR 2130 south to I-25 / US 84 / US 85	To I-25 exit 330; northern terminus of FR 2130
Tecolote			FR 2134 east (Camino del Leon) to I-25 / US 84 / US 85	To I-25 exit 335; western terminus of FR 2134
	34.370	55.313	I-25 / US 84 west / US 85	Eastern terminus; I-25 exit 339
	34.370	55.313	US 84 east	Continuation beyond I-25
1.000 mi = 1.609 km; 1.000 km = 0.621 mi

== FR 2117 ==
Frontage Road 2117 is a 0.470-mile-long (0.756 km) frontage road.

== FR 2120 ==
Frontage Road 2120 is a 1.000-mile-long (1.609 km) frontage road located west of Ilfield. FR 2120's southern terminus is at FR 2116 and the eastern terminus is a continuation as FR 2121 east.

The entire route is in San Miguel County.

Location	mi	km	Destinations	Notes
	0.000	0.000	FR 2116	Southern terminus
	1.000	1.609	FR 2121 east	Continuation as FR 2121
1.000 mi = 1.609 km; 1.000 km = 0.621 mi

== FR 2121 ==
Frontage Road 2121 is a 1.330-mile-long (2.140 km) frontage road. FR 2121's western terminus is a continuation of FR 2120 west of Ilfield and the eastern terminus is at the end of route near Ilfield.

The entire route is in San Miguel County.

Location	mi	km	Destinations	Notes
	0.000	0.000	FR 2120 south	Continuation as FR 2120
	1.330	2.140	End of route	Eastern terminus
1.000 mi = 1.609 km; 1.000 km = 0.621 mi

== FR 2122 ==
Frontage Road 2122 is a 0.867-mile-long (1.395 km) frontage road west of Sands. FR 2122's western terminus is at the end of route and the eastern terminus is at FR 2116.

The entire route is in San Miguel County.

Location	mi	km	Destinations	Notes
	0.000	0.000	End of route	Western terminus
	0.867	1.395	FR 2116	Eastern terminus
1.000 mi = 1.609 km; 1.000 km = 0.621 mi

== FR 2123 ==
Frontage Road 2123 is a 0.267-mile-long (0.430 km) frontage road. FR 2123's western terminus is at FR 2116, and the eastern terminus is at the end of route.

The entire route is in Sands, San Miguel County.

mi	km	Destinations	Notes
0.000	0.000	FR 2116	Western terminus
0.267	0.430	End of route	Eastern terminus
1.000 mi = 1.609 km; 1.000 km = 0.621 mi

== FR 2125 ==
Frontage Road 2125 is a 0.300-mile-long (0.483 km) frontage road north of San Jose. FR 2125's western terminus is at FR 2116, and the eastern terminus is at the end of route. FR 2125 is the main road into San Jose

The entire route is in San Miguel County.

Location	mi	km	Destinations	Notes
	0.000	0.000	CR B41D	Southern terminus, continues as CR B41D
	0.300	0.483	FR 2116	Northern terminus
1.000 mi = 1.609 km; 1.000 km = 0.621 mi

== FR 2126 ==
Frontage Road 2126 is a 0.200-mile-long (0.322 km) frontage road east of San Jose. FR 2126's southern terminus is at the right of way fence on the south side of I-25, and the northern terminus is at the right of way fence on the north side of I-25.

== FR 2128 ==
Frontage Road 2128 is a 0.300-mile-long (0.483 km) frontage road east of San Jose. FR 2128's western terminus is at the end of state maintenance, and the eastern terminus is at FR 2116.

The entire route is in San Miguel County.

Location	mi	km	Destinations	Notes
	0.000	0.000	Imus Ranch Road	Western terminus, continues as Imus Ranch Road
	0.300	0.483	FR 2116	Eastern terminus
1.000 mi = 1.609 km; 1.000 km = 0.621 mi

== FR 2129 ==
Frontage Road 2129 is a 1.000-mile-long (1.609 km) frontage road in Bernal. FR 2129's southern terminus is at the end of state maintenance, and the northern terminus is at FR 2116.

The entire route is in Bernal, San Miguel County.

mi	km	Destinations	Notes
0.000	0.000	End of state maintenance	Southern terminus
		I-25 / US 84 / US 85	I-25 exit 330
1.000	1.609	FR 2116 north	Northern terminus
1.000 mi = 1.609 km; 1.000 km = 0.621 mi

== FR 2130 ==
Frontage Road 2130 is a 0.333-mile-long (0.536 km) frontage road north of Bernal. FR 2130's western terminus is at FR 2116, and the eastern terminus is at the end of state maintenance.

The entire route is in San Miguel County.

Location	mi	km	Destinations	Notes
	0.000	0.000	FR 2116	Western terminus
	0.333	0.536	End of state maintenance	Eastern terminus
1.000 mi = 1.609 km; 1.000 km = 0.621 mi

== FR 2131 ==
Frontage Road 2131 is a 0.133-mile-long (0.214 km) frontage road north of Bernal. FR 2131's western terminus is at FR 2116, and the eastern terminus is at the end of state maintenance.

The entire route is in San Miguel County.

Location	mi	km	Destinations	Notes
	0.000	0.000	FR 2116	Western terminus
	0.133	0.214	End of state maintenance	Eastern terminus
1.000 mi = 1.609 km; 1.000 km = 0.621 mi

== FR 2132 ==
Frontage Road 2132 is a 0.133-mile-long (0.214 km) frontage road south of Tecolote. FR 2132's western terminus is at FR 2116, and the eastern terminus is at the end of state maintenance.

The entire route is in San Miguel County.

Location	mi	km	Destinations	Notes
	0.000	0.000	FR 2116	Western terminus
	0.133	0.214	End of state maintenance	Eastern terminus
1.000 mi = 1.609 km; 1.000 km = 0.621 mi

== FR 2134 ==
Frontage Road 2134 is a 0.250-mile-long (0.402 km) frontage road in Tecolote. FR 2123's western terminus is at FR 2116, and the eastern terminus is at FR 2135.

The entire route is in Tecolote, San Miguel County.

mi	km	Destinations	Notes
0.000	0.000	FR 2116	Western terminus
		I-25 / US 84 / US 85	I-25 exit 335
0.250	0.402	FR 2135 north	Eastern terminus; southern terminus of FR 2135
1.000 mi = 1.609 km; 1.000 km = 0.621 mi

== FR 2135 ==
Frontage Road 2135 is a 0.600-mile-long (0.966 km) frontage road in Tecolote. FR 2135's southern terminus is at FR 2134, and the northern terminus is at the end of route.

The entire route is in Tecolote, San Miguel County.

mi	km	Destinations	Notes
0.000	0.000	FR 2134 west	Southern terminus; eastern terminus of FR 2134
0.600	0.966	End of route	Northern terminus
1.000 mi = 1.609 km; 1.000 km = 0.621 mi

== FR 2136 ==
Frontage Road 2136 is a 0.150-mile-long (0.241 km) frontage road north of Tecolote. FR 2136's western terminus is at FR 2116, and the eastern terminus is at Cedar Hill Road.

The entire route is in San Miguel County.

Location	mi	km	Destinations	Notes
	0.000	0.000	FR 2116	Western terminus
	0.150	0.241	Cedar Hill Road	Eastern terminus; continues as Cedar Hill Road
1.000 mi = 1.609 km; 1.000 km = 0.621 mi

== FR 2151 ==
Frontage Road 2151 is a 45.922-mile-long (73.904 km) frontage road. The southern terminus is at NM 161 east of I-25 exit 366, north of Watrous. The northern terminus is at I-25 Bus. south of Springer. FR 2151 was the former routing of a section of US 85, and is the longest Frontage Road in New Mexico.

County	Location	mi	km	Destinations	Notes
Mora		0.000	0.000	NM 161	Southern terminus
Mora	Wagon Mound			NM 120	
Colfax				NM 569 south	Northern terminus of NM 569
Colfax		45.922	73.904	I-25 BL	Northern terminus
1.000 mi = 1.609 km; 1.000 km = 0.621 mi

== FR 2165 ==
Frontage Road 2165 is a 6.375-mile-long (10.260 km) frontage road. The southern terminus is at NM 468 and the northern terminus is the end of route by I-25 exit 419.

The entire route is in Colfax County.

Location	mi	km	Destinations	Notes
	0.000	0.000	NM 468	Southern terminus
			NM 58	
			End of route	Northern terminus
1.000 mi = 1.609 km; 1.000 km = 0.621 mi

== FR 2523 ==
Frontage Road 2523 is a 9.765-mile-long (15.715 km) frontage road. The southern terminus is at Coal Avenue east of I-25 exit 366, in Albuquerque. The northern terminus is at NM 556 in Albuquerque. FR 2523 is a one-way northbound road.

The entire route is in Albuquerque, Bernalillo County.

mi	km	Destinations	Notes
0.000	0.000	Coal Avenue	Southern terminus
		I-25 / US 85 north	I-25 exit 224 northbound on ramp
		Historic US 66 (Central Avenue)	
		I-25 / US 85 north	I-25 exit 224 northbound on ramp
		FR 4029 east (South Frontage Road) to I-40 east	One-way eastbound
		FR 4026 west (North Frontage Road) to I-40 west	One-way westbound
		I-25 / US 85 north	I-25 exit 227 northbound on ramp
		I-25 / US 85 north	I-25 exit 228 northbound on ramp
		I-25 / US 85 north	I-25 exit 229 northbound on ramp
		I-25 / US 85 north	I-25 exit 231 northbound on ramp
		NM 423 (Paseo Del Norte)	
		I-25 / US 85 north	I-25 exit 232 northbound on ramp
		NM 528 north (Alameda Boulevard)	Southern terminus of NM 528
		I-25 / US 85 north	I-25 exit 233 northbound on ramp
9.765	15.715	I-25 / US 85 north / NM 556	Northern terminus, I-25 exit 234 northbound on ramp
1.000 mi = 1.609 km; 1.000 km = 0.621 mi

== FR 2537 ==
Frontage Road 2537 is a 9.547-mile-long (15.364 km) frontage road. The northern terminus is at NM 556 in Albuquerque. The southern terminus is at Central Avenue west of I-25 exit 366, in Albuquerque. FR 2537 is a one-way southbound road.

The entire route is in Albuquerque, Bernalillo County.

mi	km	Destinations	Notes
0.000	0.000	NM 556	Northern terminus
		I-25 / US 85 south	I-25 exit 234 southbound on ramp
		NM 528 (Alameda Boulevard)	
		I-25 / US 85 south	I-25 exit 233 southbound on ramp
		NM 423 (Paseo Del Norte)	
		I-25 / US 85 south	I-25 exit 231 southbound on ramp
		I-25 / US 85 south	I-25 exit 230 southbound on ramp
		I-25 / US 85 south	I-25 exit 229 southbound on ramp
		I-25 / US 85 south	I-25 exit 228 southbound on ramp
		I-25 / US 85 south	I-25 exit 227 southbound on ramp
		FR 4026 west (North Frontage Road) to I-40 west	One-way westbound road
		FR 4029 east (South Frontage Road) to I-40 east	One-way eastbound road
9.547	15.364	Historic US 66 (Central Avenue) / I-25 / US 85 south	Southern terminus, I-25 exit 224 southbound on ramp
1.000 mi = 1.609 km; 1.000 km = 0.621 mi

== FR 4026 ==
Frontage Road 4026 is a 1.350-mile-long (2.173 km) frontage road. The eastern terminus is at University Avenue at the I-40 exit 366 westbound off ramp, in Albuquerque. The western terminus is at 4th Street at the I-40 exit 158 westbound on ramp in Albuquerque. FR 4026 is a one-way westbound road.

The entire route is in Albuquerque, Bernalillo County.

mi	km	Destinations	Notes
0.000	0.000	University Avenue	Eastern terminus
		FR 2523 north to I-25 / US 85 north	One-way northbound
		FR 2537 south to I-25 / US 85 south	One-way southbound
1.350	2.173	I-40 west / 4th Street	Western terminus; I-40 exit 158 westbound on ramp
1.000 mi = 1.609 km; 1.000 km = 0.621 mi

== FR 4029 ==
Frontage Road 4029 is a 1.369-mile-long (2.203 km) frontage road. The western terminus is at 4th Street at the I-40 exit 158 eastbound off ramp, in Albuquerque. The eastern terminus is at University Avenue at the I-40 exit 159 eastbound on ramp in Albuquerque. FR 4029 is a one-way eastbound road.

The entire route is in Albuquerque, Bernalillo County.

mi	km	Destinations	Notes
0.000	0.000	4th Street	Western terminus
		FR 2537 south to I-25 / US 85 south	One-way southbound
		FR 2523 north to I-25 / US 85 north	One-way northbound
1.350	2.173	I-40 east / University Avenue	Eastern terminus; I-40 exit 159 eastbound on ramp
1.000 mi = 1.609 km; 1.000 km = 0.621 mi

== See also ==
- List of state roads in New Mexico
