= San Antonio de Padua Church =

Historic church in New Mexico, United States

- U.S. National Register of Historic Places
- NM State Register of Cultural Properties
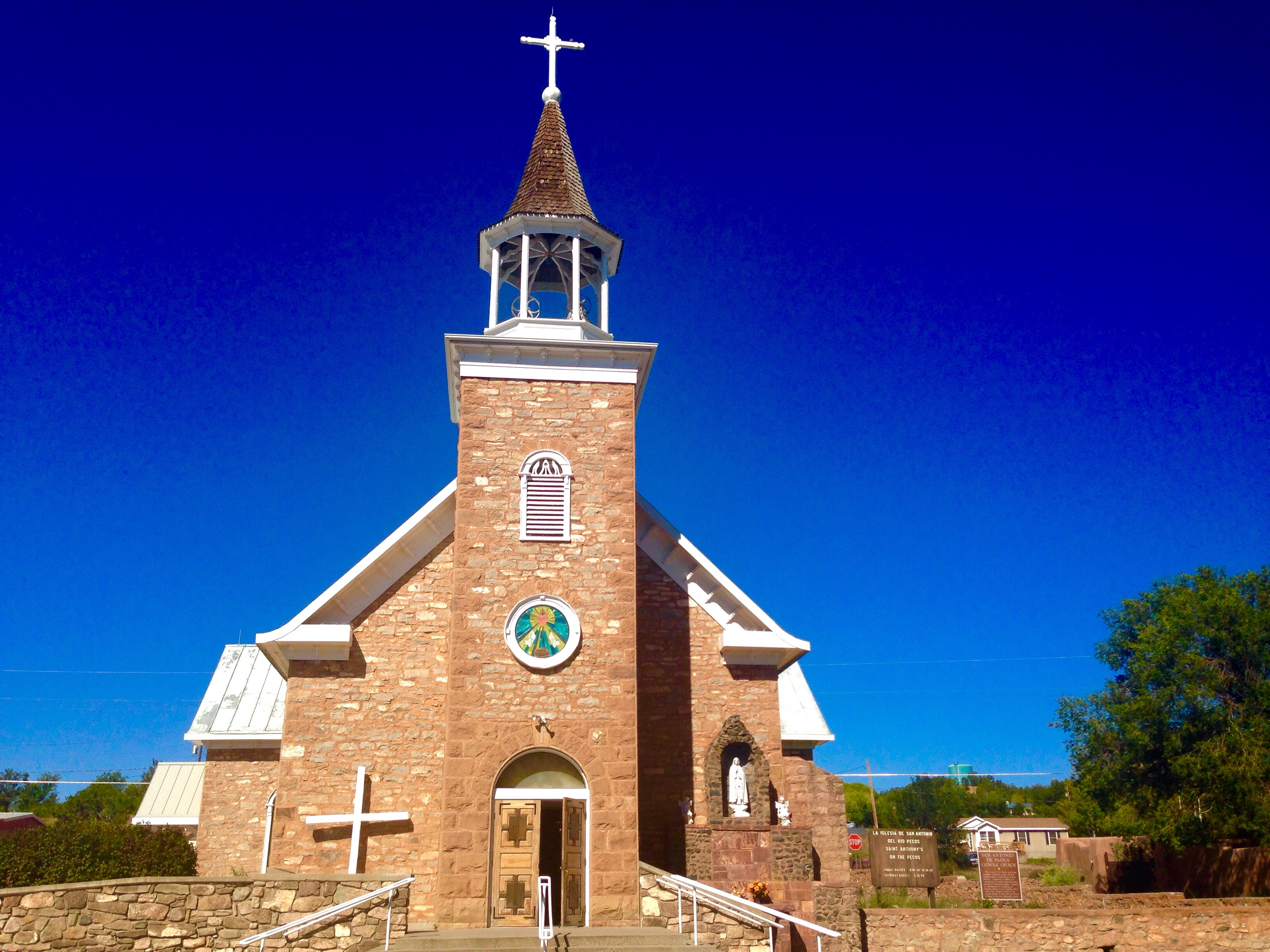
- San Antonio de Padua Church

- Location within New Mexico Location within the United States
- Location: NM 63, Pecos, New Mexico
- Coordinates: 35°34′59″N 105°40′31″W
- Area: 2.5 acres (1.0 ha)
- Built: 1903-06
- NRHP reference No.: 78001826
- NMSRCP No.: 304

Significant dates
- Added to NRHP: September 13, 1978
- Designated NMSRCP: May 21, 1971

San Antonio de Padua Church is a historic church along State Road 63 in Pecos, New Mexico. It was built during 1903 to 1906 and added to the National Register of Historic Places in 1978.

It is a cruciform-plan church, located about 2.5 miles (4.0 km) north of the ruins of the Pecos Pueblo ruins.

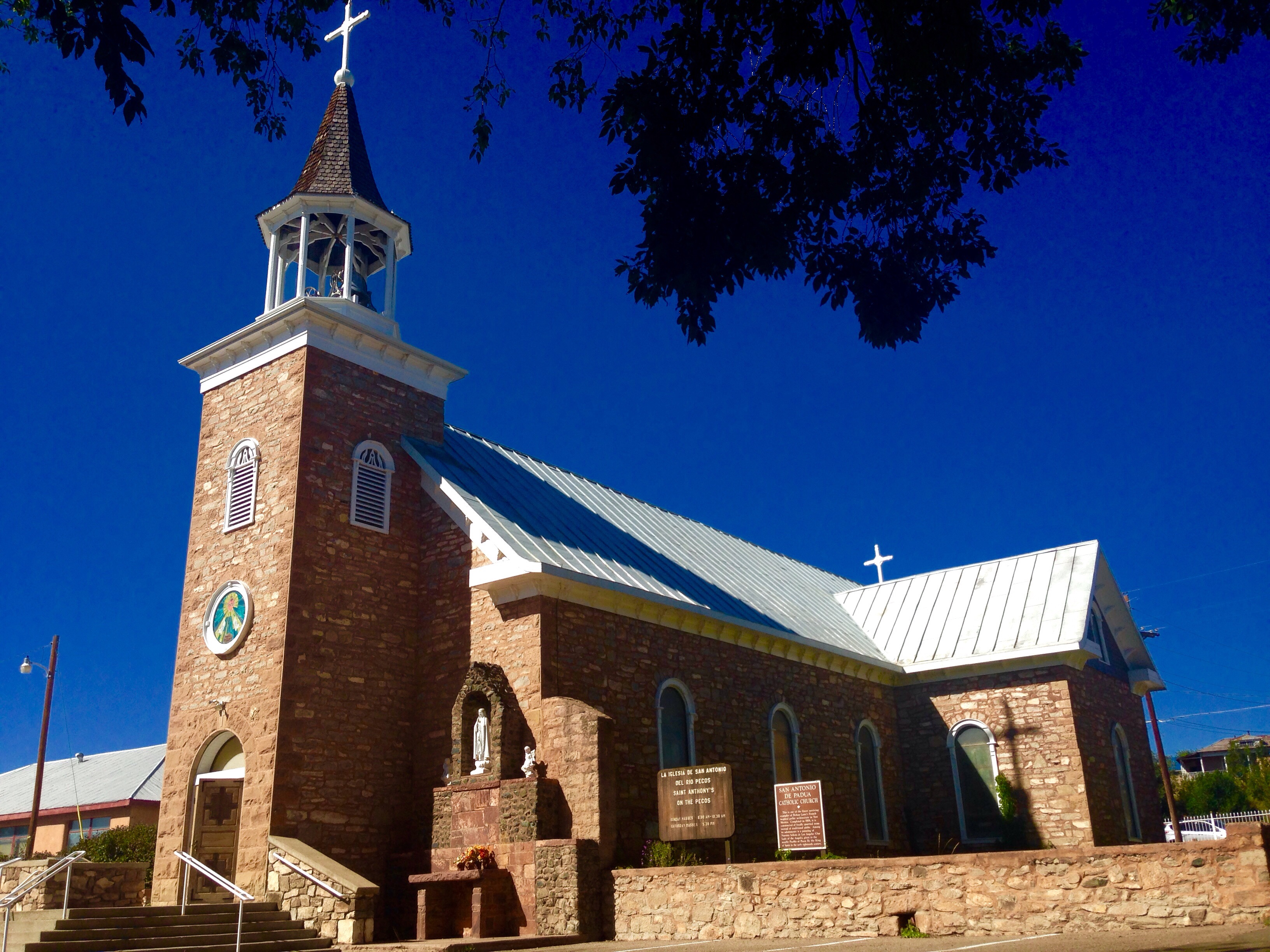
Side view of the church

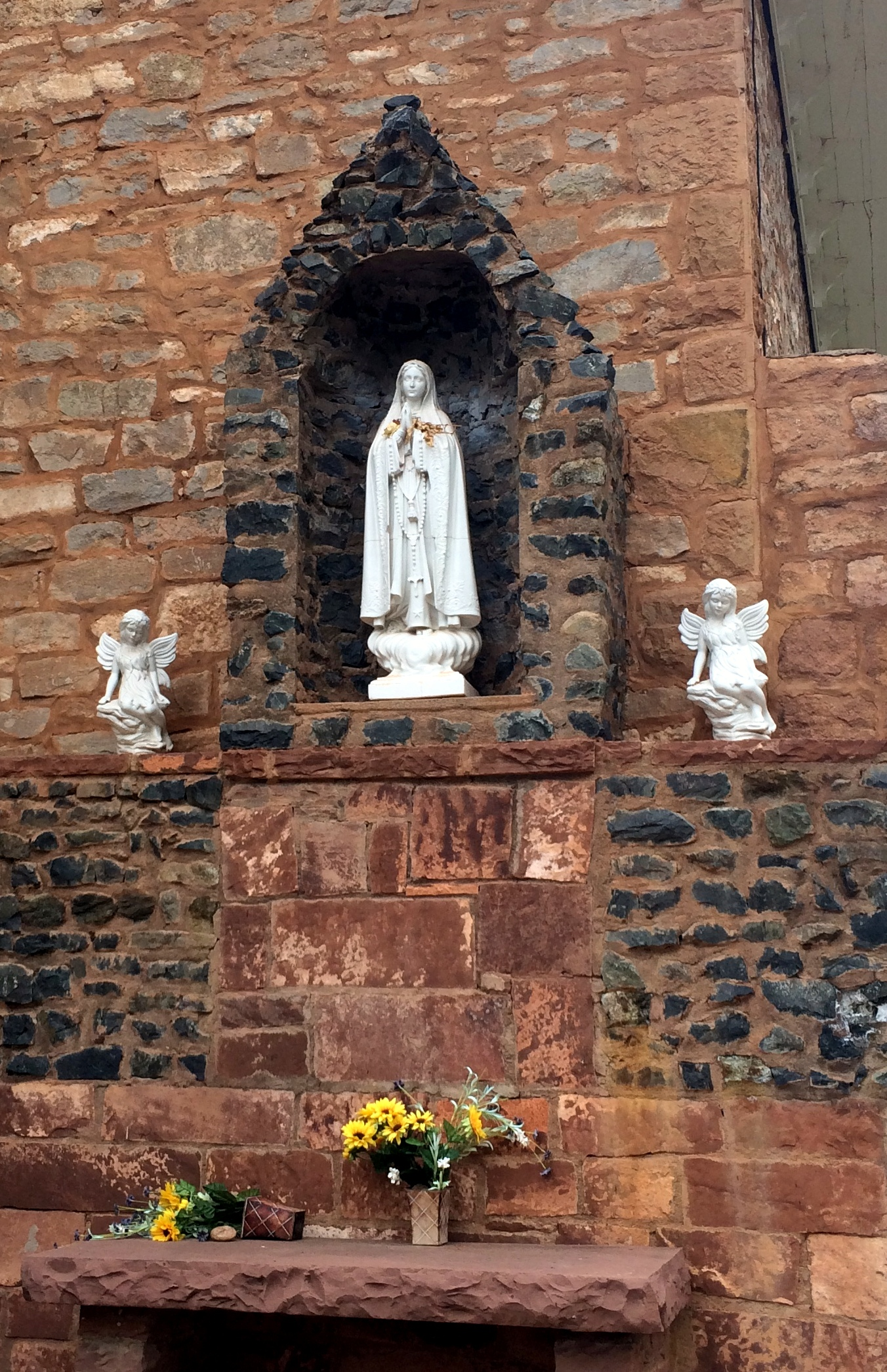
Statues

== See also ==
- National Register of Historic Places listings in San Miguel County, New Mexico
- Properties of religious function on the National Register of Historic Places in New Mexico
