= Los Trigos Land Grant =

Coordinates: 35°28′39.8″N 105°38′33.2″W

The Los Trigos Land Grant was established in the very early 19th century. The grant is situated on the Pecos River in San Miguel County, New Mexico, about 29 miles southwest of Santa Fe and 38 miles west of Las Vegas via I-25.

== Geography ==
The "communities" within the grant were Los Trigos itself, Pajarito and Las Ruedas. Of the three, only Pajarito remains with a few buildings visible from I-25 a couple of miles south of Rowe, New Mexico. The grant never had any other communities and was itself sandwiched between the Pecos Pueblo Indian Grant to the north and The San Miguel del Bado Land Grant to the South.

== Owners ==
Over recent times, the grant has been owned by a succession of people, mostly associated with the film industry. They have included Greer Garson and her husband Buddy Fogelson, Jane Fonda and Val Kilmer. Currently, there is no private access to the grant except for the northern portion currently owned and managed by the Pecos National Historical Park.

At one time, the grant was owned by the Atchison, Topeka and Santa Fe Railway and extensively logged for railroad ties. The Ponderosa Pine, which was an important component on the grant, was essentially removed as a result of the tie making going on as the railroad passed near by.

The name of New Mexico's first Hispanic Governor, Donaciano Vigil, after the Americans conquered and annexed the province, is closely associated with the grant.
