= New Mexico State Road 34 =

State highway in New Mexico, United States

State Road 34
- NM 34 highlighted in red

Route information
- Maintained by NMDOT

Major junctions
- South end: US 285 near Clines Corners
- North end: FR 2116 near Rowe

Location
- Country: United States
- State: New Mexico
- Counties: San Miguel

Highway system
- New Mexico State Highway System; Interstate; US; State; Scenic
← NM 32	→ NM 35

State Road 34 (NM 34) is a state highway in the US state of New Mexico. Its total length is approximately 20 miles (32 km). NM 34's southern terminus is at U.S. Route 285 (US 285), 16 miles (26 km) northwest of Clines Corners, and the northern terminus is at Frontage Road 2116 (FR 2116), southeast of Rowe.

== Major intersections ==
The entire route is in San Miguel County.

Location	mi	km	Destinations	Notes
			Santa Fe/San Miguel County Line	Southern terminus
			FR 2116 NM 63 to I-25 / US 84 / US 85	Northern terminus
1.000 mi = 1.609 km; 1.000 km = 0.621 mi
