= Las Ruedas, New Mexico =

Town in San Miguel County, New Mexico

Coordinates: 35.498°N 105.648°W

Las Ruedas was a small Hispanic village located in San Miguel County, New Mexico, on the Pecos River not far away from present-day Rowe, New Mexico on the Los Trigos Land Grant. It was originally settled in the early 19th century and survived until the 1880s when the Santa Fe Railroad passed by the area. The railroad drew most of the residents to Rowe. The 1870 census has people living in Las Ruedas, but most seem to have gone by the 1900 census. In the 1900 Federal Census many of the 1870 inhabitants of Las Ruedas can now be found in Rowe, New Mexico.
