= New Mexico State Road 50 =

State highway in New Mexico, United States

State Road 50

Route information
- Maintained by NMDOT
- Length: 6.028 mi (9.701 km)

Major junctions
- West end: I-25 / US 84 / US 85 in Glorieta
- East end: NM 63 / NM 223 in Pecos

Location
- Country: United States
- State: New Mexico
- Counties: San Miguel, Santa Fe

Highway system
- New Mexico State Highway System; Interstate; US; State; Scenic
← NM 48	→ NM 51

State Road 50 (NM 50) is a state highway in the US state of New Mexico. Its total length is approximately 6 miles (9.7 km). NM 50's western terminus is in the village of Glorieta at Interstate 25 (I-25), U.S. Route 84 (US 84) and US 85 and the eastern terminus is in the village of Pecos at NM 63 and NM 223.

== Major intersections ==
County	Location	mi	km	Destinations	Notes
Santa Fe	Glorieta	0.000	0.000	I-25 / US 84 / US 85 / Santa Fe Trail Scenic Byway – Las Vegas, Santa Fe	Western terminus
San Miguel	Pecos	6.028	9.701	NM 63 / NM 223 east / Santa Fe Trail Scenic Byway – Terrero, Rowe, Monastery Lake, Pecos National Historical Park	Eastern terminus, western terminus of NM 223
1.000 mi = 1.609 km; 1.000 km = 0.621 mi
