= Pedro Zambrano Ortiz =

Spanish Franciscan friar

Pedro Zambrano Ortiz, O.F.M.
- Born: c. 1586; Canary Islands, Spain
- Occupations: Franciscan friar and Catholic priest
- Known for: Founding the Mission Nuestra Señora de los Ángeles de Porciúncula de los Pecos

Pedro Zambrano Ortiz, O.F.M., (born c. 1586) was a Spanish Franciscan friar who was guardian of the Mission Nuestra Señora de los Ángeles de Porciúncula de los Pecos in the settlement of Pecos, in the Province of Santa Fe de Nuevo México of New Spain, from no later than 1619 until the fall of 1621. He then served at Galisteo Pueblo, and was still in charge of the mission in 1632

== Early life ==
Zambrano was born in the Canary Islands around 1586. As a young man, he moved to Spanish colony of New Spain, where he later became a Franciscan novice at the Convento Grande in Mexico City on 27 October 1609, and took religious vows a year later.

== Pecos missionary ==
In the fall of 1616, Zambrano accompanied the mission supply caravan north to New Mexico, arriving before the end of January 1617. An early attempt had been made to establish a mission at Pecos Pueblo, but had been abandoned. Seventeen missionaries led by Fray Alonso de Peinado had arrived between 1610 and 1612, but had been assigned to other missions. Zambrano and his fellow-missionaries may have founded the convent at Pecos in makeshift quarters as early as August 1617. Zambrano was first mentioned as guardián of Pecos in 1619. He probably built the first church, an isolated building on a narrow ridge about 440 yards (400 m) northeast of the pueblo's main quadrangle. The pueblo would not allow construction of a church closer to their dwellings.

The missionaries were opposed in their efforts by the Governor of New Mexico, the veteran soldier Juan de Eulate, who held office from 1618 to 1625. The governor told the Pueblo Indians of the province that they did not have to renounce their traditional religious practices. According to Zambrano, Eulate protected "idolators and witches because they trade him tanned skins." According to the missionaries the governor was not interested in protecting Indian rights, but was only interested in exploiting them. He gave his followers licenses that permitted them to take Indian "orphans" and use them as servants, as long as they did not mistreat them and taught them the Christian catechism.

== Later career ==
At some time before August 1621, Zambrano changed place with the missionary serving Galisteo Pueblo. Zambrano was recorded as guardian of Galisteo in 1621, and was still in charge of the mission in 1632. On his arrival there he found that the Tanos were openly engaging in their traditional religious practices. He was told by a native catechist whom he reproached for keeping a concubine that the Tanos were expecting to soon receive permission to "live as before they were Christians."

Zambrano blamed Eulate for the conditions at Galisteo, saying he was "more suited to a junk shop than to the office of governor he holds ... a bag of arrogance and vanity without love for God or zeal for divine honor or for the king our lord, a man of evil example in word and deed who does not deserve to be governor but rather a hawker and [a creature] of these vile pursuits." On 11 April 1626 Zambrano said that Governor Eulate had ordered a deputy of the Confraternity of the Mother of God de la Concepcíon to be falsely accused and hanged because of his membership, and because he was a pious man. He said that due to Eulate's bad influence the settlers would rather gamble in his house than attend the confraternities.

Zambrano was still in New Mexico in 1636, and was still attacking the governor of the day.
