= New Mexico State Road 223 =

State highway in New Mexico, United States

State Road 223

Route information
- Maintained by NMDOT
- Length: 2.184 mi (3.515 km)

Major junctions
- West end: NM 63 / NM 50 in Pecos
- East end: CR B64 near Pecos

Location
- Country: United States
- State: New Mexico
- Counties: San Miguel

Highway system
- New Mexico State Highway System; Interstate; US; State; Scenic
← NM 222	→ NM 224

State Road 223 (NM 223) is a 2.184-mile-long (3.515 km) state highway in the US state of New Mexico. NM 223's western terminus is at NM 63 and the eastern terminus of NM 50 in Pecos, and NM 223's eastern terminus is a continuation as County Route B64 (CR B64) east-northeast of Pecos.

== Major intersections ==
The entire route is in San Miguel County.

Location	mi	km	Destinations	Notes
Pecos	0.000	0.000	NM 63 / NM 50 west	Western terminus, eastern terminus of NM 50
	2.184	3.515	CR B64	Eastern terminus, continues south as CR B64
1.000 mi = 1.609 km; 1.000 km = 0.621 mi
