= Nuestra Señora Reina de los Angeles =

Nuestra Señora Reina de los Angeles, as the name of a mission, may refer to:

- Nuestra Señora Reina de los Ángeles Asistencia in Los Angeles
- Mission Nuestra Señora de los Ángeles de Porciúncula de los Pecos in Pecos, New Mexico
- La Iglesia de Nuestra Señora la Reina de los Ángeles, La Placita church in Los Angeles
- El Rio de Nuestra Señora La Reina de Los Angeles de Porciúncula, the Los Angeles River
