= Tererro, New Mexico =

Unincorporated community in New Mexico, United States

Terrero
- Unincorporated community
- Location within the state of New Mexico Terrero (the United States)
- Coordinates: 35°44′31″N 105°40′30″W
- Country: United States
- State: New Mexico
- County: San Miguel
- Elevation: 7,714 ft (2,351 m)
- Time zone: UTC-7 (Mountain (MST))
  - Summer (DST): UTC-6 (MDT)
- ZIP codes: 87573
- Area code: 505
- GNIS feature ID: 911611

Terrero is an unincorporated community located in San Miguel County, New Mexico, United States. The community is located on New Mexico State Road 63, 11.6 miles (18.7 km) north of Pecos. Terrero had a post office (now closed) with ZIP code 87573.
