= New Mexico State Road 569 =

Highway in New Mexico

State Road 569
- NM 569 highlighted in red

Route information
- Maintained by NMDOT
- Length: 13.886 mi (22.347 km)

Major junctions
- South end: End of route at Charette Lake
- I-25 / US 85 near Colmor
- North end: FR 2151 near Colmor

Location
- Country: United States
- State: New Mexico
- Counties: Colfax, Mora

Highway system
- New Mexico State Highway System; Interstate; US; State; Scenic
← NM 568	→ NM 570

State Road 569 (NM 569) is a 13.886-mile-long (22.347 km) state highway in the US state of New Mexico. NM 569's southern terminus is at the end of route at Charette Lake, and the northern terminus is at Frontage Road 2151 (FR 2151) (Former US 85) north-northeast of Colmor just east of the junction with Interstate 25 (I-25).

== Major intersections ==
County	Location	mi	km	Destinations	Notes
Colfax		0.000	0.000	FR 2151 (Former US 85)	Northern terminus
Colfax		0.600– 0.700	0.966– 1.127	I-25 / US 85	I-25 exit 404
Mora	Charette Lake	13.886	22.347	End of route	Southern terminus
1.000 mi = 1.609 km; 1.000 km = 0.621 mi
