= Mission Nuestra Señora de los Ángeles de Porciúncula de los Pecos =

Catholic mission near Pecos, New Mexico

Coordinates: 35°33′00″N 105°41′21″W

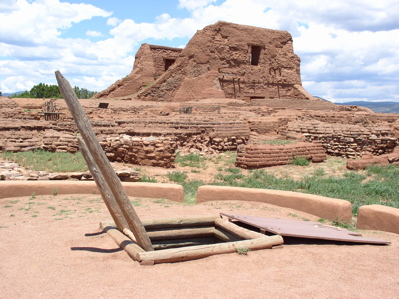
Ruins of the Pecos pueblo and mission church.

Another mission that bore the name Nuestra Señora Reina de los Ángeles is the former Nuestra Señora Reina de los Ángeles Asistencia in Los Angeles, California.

The Mission Nuestra Señora de los Ángeles de Porciúncula ("Mission of Our Lady of the Angels of Porciúncula") was a mission that served the people of the Pecos Pueblo, near modern Pecos, New Mexico, from sometime around 1619.

The first church at the Pecos Pueblo was probably built by the Franciscan Fray Pedro Zambrano Ortiz by 1619, an isolated building on a narrow ridge about 440 yards (400 m) northeast of the pueblo's main quadrangle. The people of the pueblo would not allow construction of a church closer to their dwellings.

In 1625, a more permanent church was constructed outside the walls of the pueblo of Pecos, New Mexico. The church building was destroyed in the Pueblo Revolt of 1680, wherein the Spanish were ejected from New Mexico. After the Spanish reconquest in 1693, a smaller church was built in 1717. The walls of this later church still stand on top of the earlier church's stone foundation.

The ruins are located some 20 miles east of Santa Fe, New Mexico, off I-25 in Pecos National Historic Park.

== See also ==
- Alonso de Posada
- Spanish missions in New Mexico
