= Pecos River =

River in New Mexico and Texas, United States

Pecos River Río Pecos Río Natagés
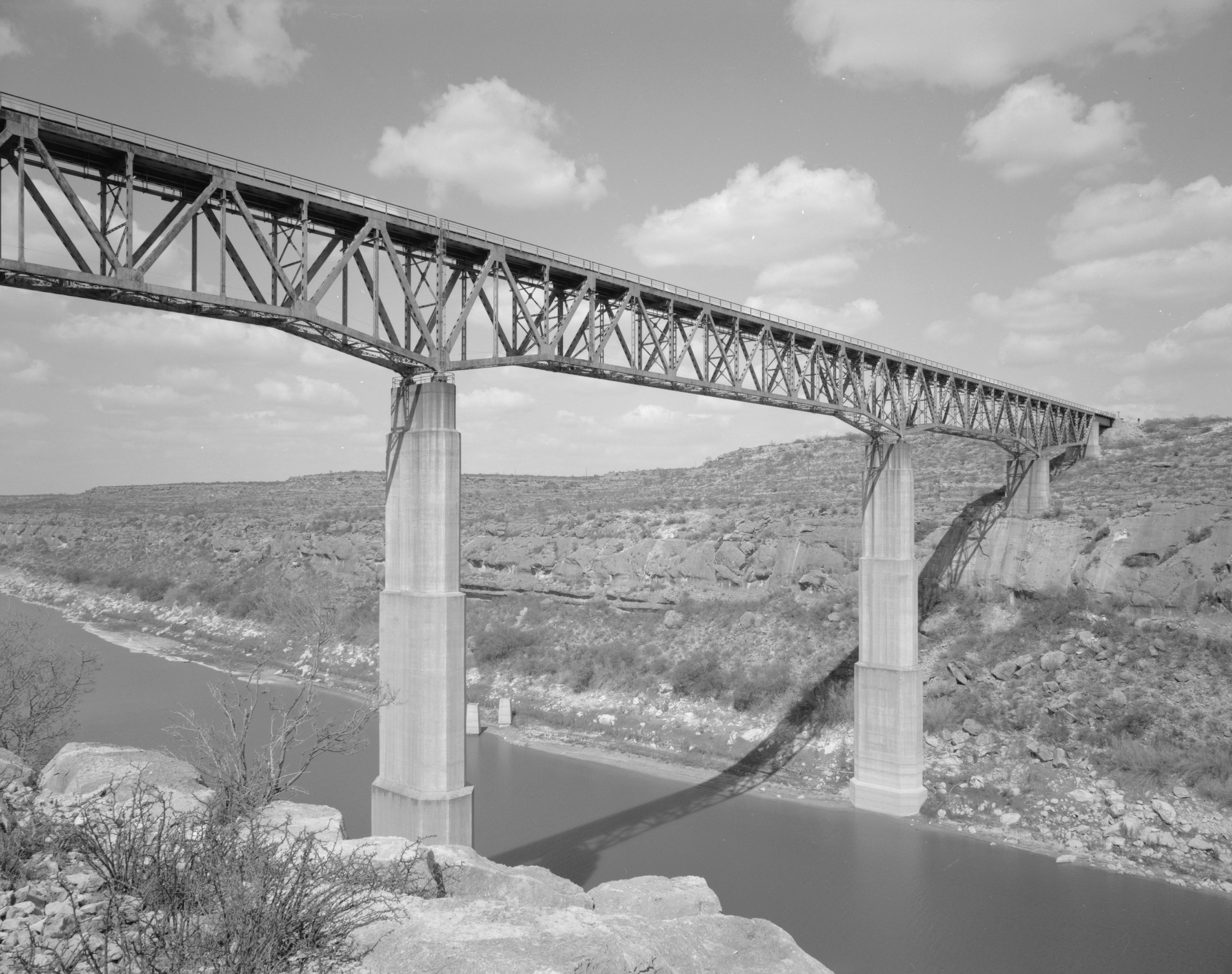
- Pecos River High Bridge, near Langtry, Val Verde County, Texas

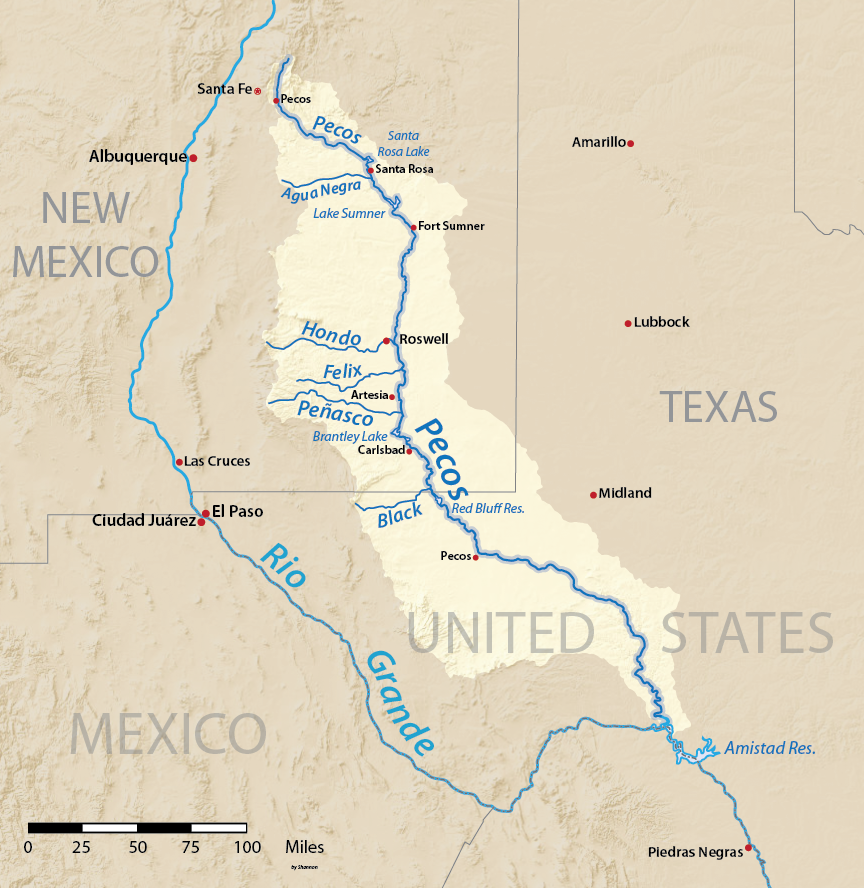
- Map of the Pecos River watershed.

Location
- Country: United States
- State: Texas, New Mexico

Physical characteristics
- Source: Pecos Falls
  - location: 29 mi (47 km) north of Pecos, New Mexico
  - coordinates: 35°58′34″N 105°33′29″W
  - elevation: 11,759 ft (3,584 m)
- Mouth: Rio Grande
  - location: Seminole Canyon, Val Verde County, 37 mi (60 km) northwest of Del Rio, Texas
  - coordinates: 29°41′59″N 101°22′17″W
  - elevation: 1,115 ft (340 m)
- Length: 926 mi (1,490 km)
- Basin size: 44,402 sq mi (115,000 km^{2})
- Discharge
  - location: IBWC station 08-4474.10 near Langtry, Texas
  - average: 265 cu ft/s (7.5 m^{3}/s)
  - minimum: 42 cu ft/s (1.2 m^{3}/s)
  - maximum: 152,910 cu ft/s (4,330 m^{3}/s)

National Wild and Scenic River
- Type: Wild, Recreational
- Designated: June 6, 1990

The Pecos River (/ˈpeɪkəs/ PAY-kəs; Spanish: Río Pecos) originates in north-central New Mexico and flows into Texas, emptying into the Rio Grande. Its headwaters are on the eastern slope of the Sangre de Cristo mountain range in Mora County north of Pecos, New Mexico, at an elevation of over 12,000 feet (3,700 m). The river flows for 926 miles (1,490 km) before reaching the Rio Grande near Del Rio. Its drainage basin encompasses about 44,300 square miles (115,000 km^{2}).

The name "Pecos" derives from the Keresan term for the Pecos Pueblo, p’æyok’ona. The Pecos people called the river Tǫ́ǫk’ô P’ǽ̨æ̨wâamu ('corn cob river valley'). The river was also historically referred to as the Río Natagés after the Mescalero people.

== History ==
The river was the eastern territory of the Faraon (‘Pharaoh’) Apache Indians, a tribe of Apache, probably closely related to the Mescalero Apache, if not part of them. Their divisions were Ancavistis, Jacomis, Orejones, Carlanes, and Cuampes, but of these the Carlanes at least belonged to the Jicarillas. The river later played a large role in the exploration of Texas by the Spanish. In the latter half of the 19th century, "West of the Pecos" was a reference to the rugged desolation of the Wild West. New Mexico and Texas disputed water rights to the river until the U.S. government settled the dispute in 1949 with the Pecos River Compact. The Pecos River Settlement Agreement was signed between New Mexico and Texas in 2003.

== Dams ==
Multiple dams have been built along the Pecos River. Santa Rosa Lake is 117 miles/188 km east of Albuquerque. Sumner Lake, formed by the 1939 Sumner Dam, is located between Santa Rosa and Fort Sumner, New Mexico. Two dams are located north of Carlsbad, New Mexico, at Avalon Dam and Brantley Dam, to help irrigate about 25,000 acres (10,000 ha) as part of the Carlsbad reclamation project (established in 1906). Texas has also dammed the river at the Red Bluff Dam in the western part of that state to form the Red Bluff Reservoir. The portion of the reservoir that extends into New Mexico forms the lowest point in that state.

== Wild and Scenic River ==
On June 6, 1990, 20.5 miles (33 km) of the Pecos River—from its headwaters to the townsite of Tererro—received National Wild and Scenic River designation. It includes 13.5 miles (22 km) designated "wild" and 7 miles (11 km) designated "recreational".

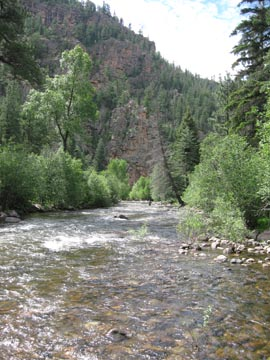
Pecos River between Terrerro and Pecos, New Mexico

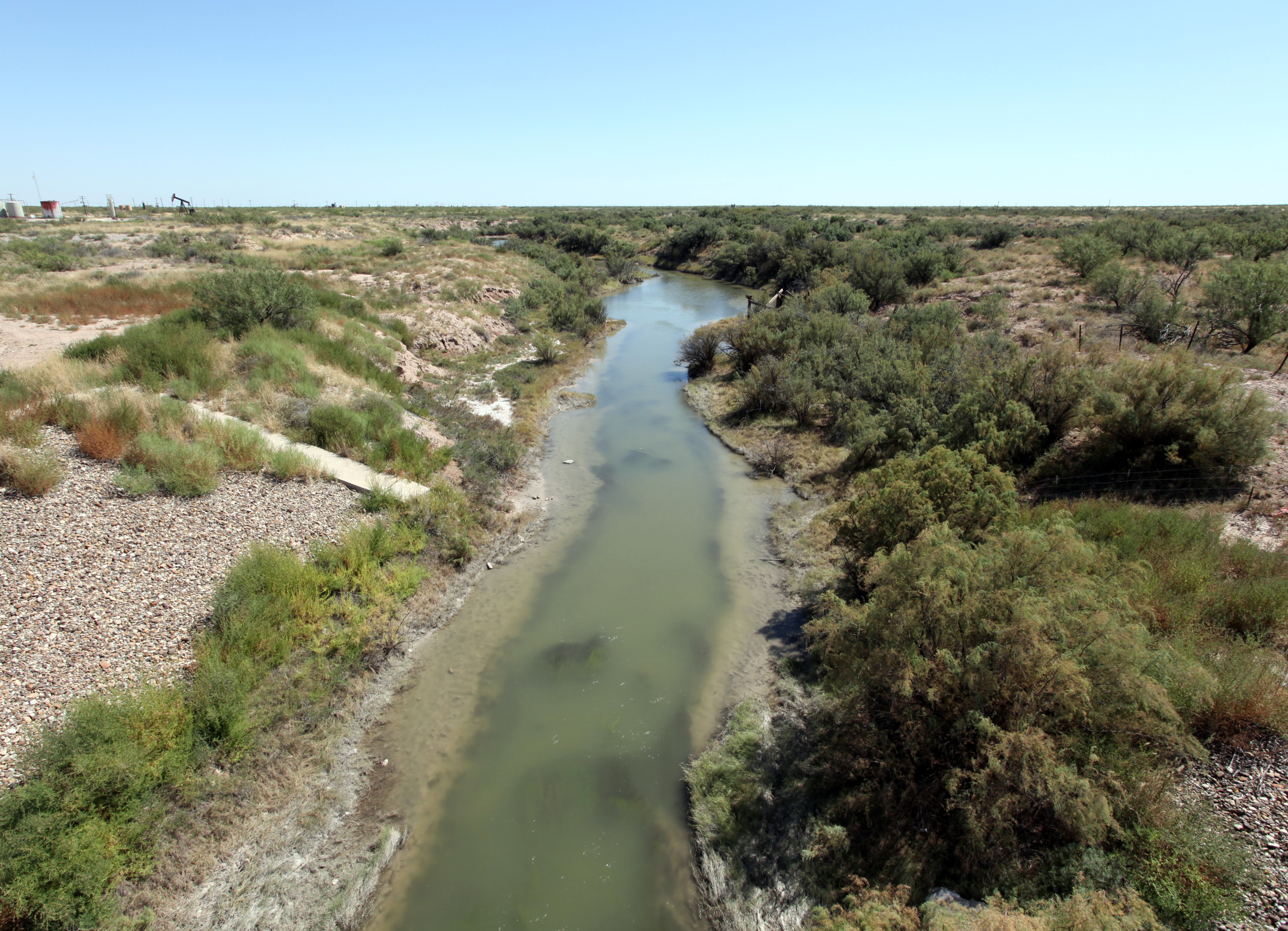
The Pecos River flowing south of Grandfalls, Texas

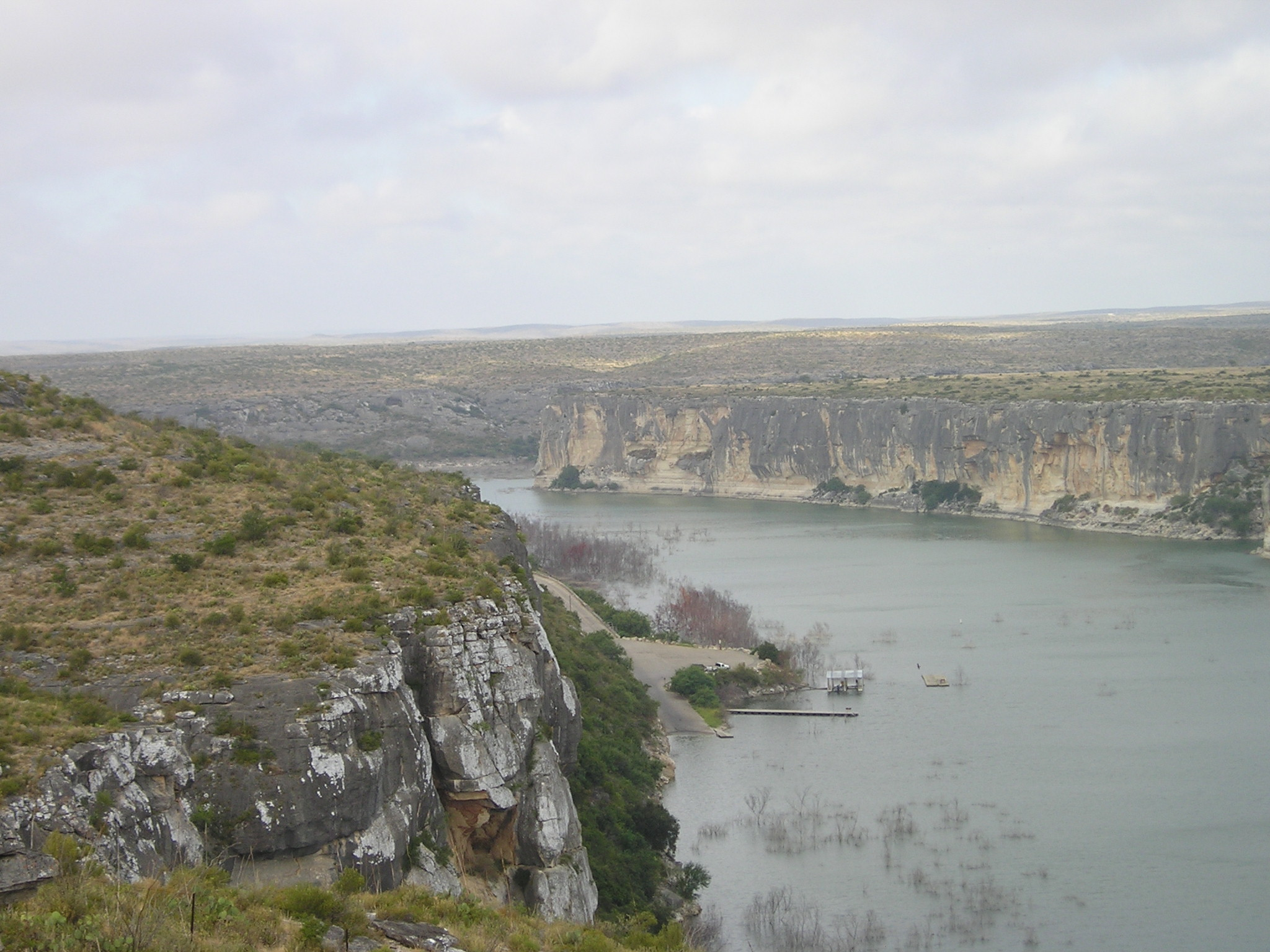
Pecos River near the Rio Grande

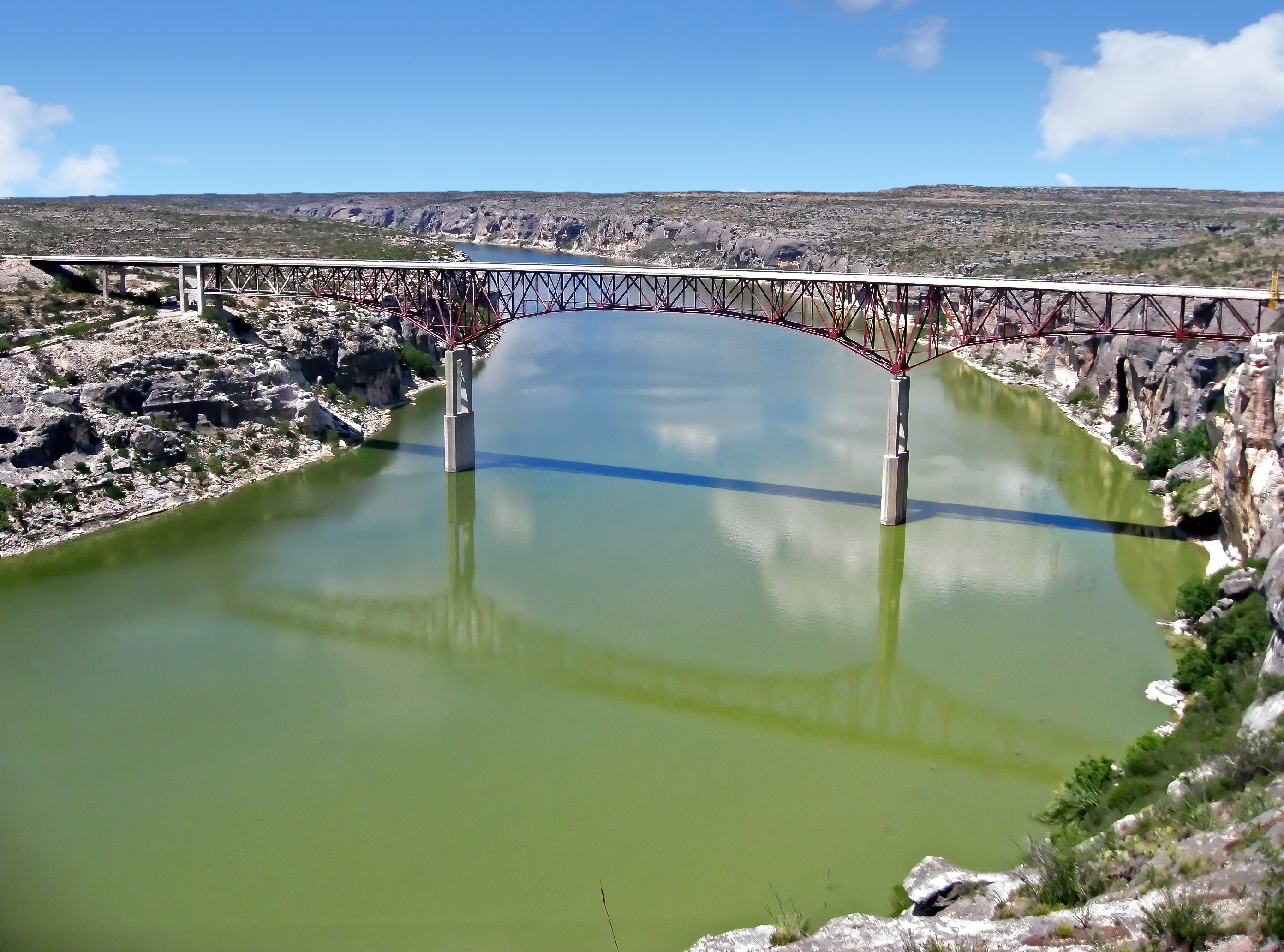
Pecos River Highway Bridge

== Pecos River Flume ==
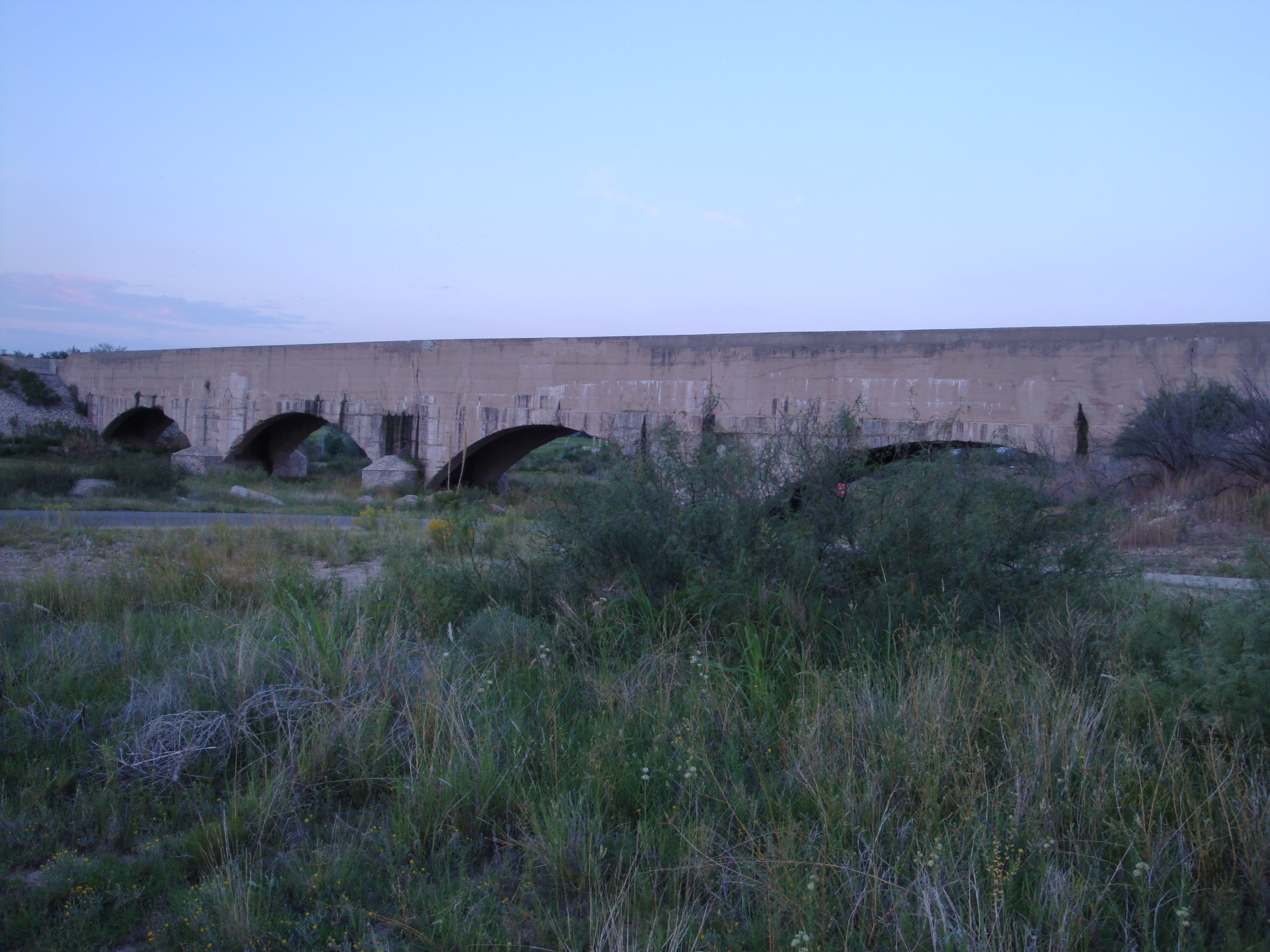
Pecos River Flume

The Pecos River Flume is an aqueduct carrying irrigation water over the Pecos River. Construction took place from 1889 to 1890 and was part of the Pecos River Reclamation Project. It was originally constructed of wood and spanned 145 feet (44 m). It carried water at a depth of 8 feet (2.4 m). In 1902, a flood destroyed the flume and it was subsequently rebuilt using concrete. In 1902, it was identified as the largest concrete aqueduct in the world.

The flume and its surrounding area have been reclaimed by the city of Carlsbad and transformed into a tourist attraction, with park improvements along the river and spotlights to give a spectacular nightly view.

== See also ==
- List of longest rivers of the United States (by main stem)
- List of tributaries of the Rio Grande
- List of rivers of New Mexico
- List of rivers of Texas
