= Tecolote, New Mexico =

- Unincorporated community
- Location within New Mexico
- Coordinates: 35°27′38″N 105°17′03″W
- Country: United States
- State: New Mexico
- County: San Miguel

Area
  - Total: 5.63 sq mi (14.57 km^{2})
  - Land: 5.63 sq mi (14.57 km^{2})
  - Water: 0 sq mi (0.00 km^{2})
- Elevation: 6,316 ft (1,925 m)

Population (2020)
  - Total: 234
  - Density: 41.6/sq mi (16.06/km^{2})
- Time zone: UTC-7 (Mountain (MST))
  - Summer (DST): UTC-6 (MDT)
- Area code: 505
- GNIS feature ID: 2584222

Tecolote is an unincorporated community and census-designated place in San Miguel County, New Mexico, United States. As of the 2020 census, Tecolote had a population of 234. The community is located along Interstate 25 at Exit 335.

Etymology: The name is Mexican Spanish for "owl" (from Nahuatl tecolatl).

== Geography ==
According to the U.S. Census Bureau, the community has an area of 5.625 square miles (14.57 km^{2}), all land.

== Demographics ==
Historical population
Census	Pop.	Note	%±
2020	234		—
U.S. Decennial Census

== Education ==
It is in the West Las Vegas Schools school district. West Las Vegas High School is the area high school.
