= Bernal, New Mexico =

Unincorporated community in San Miguel County, NM

- Unincorporated community
- Location within New Mexico
- Coordinates: 35°23′34″N 105°19′03″W
- Country: United States
- State: New Mexico
- County: San Miguel
- Elevation: 6,152 ft (1,875 m)
- Time zone: UTC-7 (Mountain (MST))
  - Summer (DST): UTC-6 (MDT)
- Area code: 505
- GNIS feature ID: 903757

Named after Eric Bernal of Las Cruces, New Mexico, Bernal is an unincorporated community in San Miguel County, New Mexico, United States.
