= New Mexico State Road 63 =

State highway in New Mexico, United States

State Road 63

Route information
- Maintained by NMDOT
- Length: 25.146 mi (40.469 km)

Major junctions
- South end: I-25 / US 84 / US 85 in Rowe
- North end: Cabana Trail in Cowles

Location
- Country: United States
- State: New Mexico
- Counties: San Miguel

Highway system
- New Mexico State Highway System; Interstate; US; State; Scenic
← US 62	→ US 64

State Road 63 (NM 63) is a state highway in the US state of New Mexico. Its total length is approximately 25.1 miles (40.4 km). NM 63's northern terminus is a continuation as Cabana Trail in Cowles, and the southern terminus is at Interstate 25 (I-25), U.S. Route 84 (US 84) and US 85 in Rowe.

== Major intersections ==
The entire route is in San Miguel County.

Location	mi	km	Destinations	Notes
Rowe	0.000	0.000	I-25 / US 84 / US 85 / Santa Fe Trail Scenic Byway	Southern terminus
Rowe	0.300	0.483	FR 2115 south To I-25 north / US 84 east / US 85 north	To I-25 exit 307 northbound; northern terminus of FR 2115
Rowe	0.600	0.966	I-25 south / US 84 west / US 85 south	I-25 exit 307 southbound
Pecos	4.825	7.765	NM 50 west / NM 223 east to I-25 / Santa Fe Trail Scenic Byway – Santa Fe	Eastern terminus of NM 50, western terminus of NM 223
Cowles	25.146	40.469	Cabana Trail	Northern terminus
1.000 mi = 1.609 km; 1.000 km = 0.621 mi

== See also ==
- List of state roads in New Mexico
