= Rowe, New Mexico =

Census-designated place in San Miguel County, New Mexico, United States

- Census-designated place
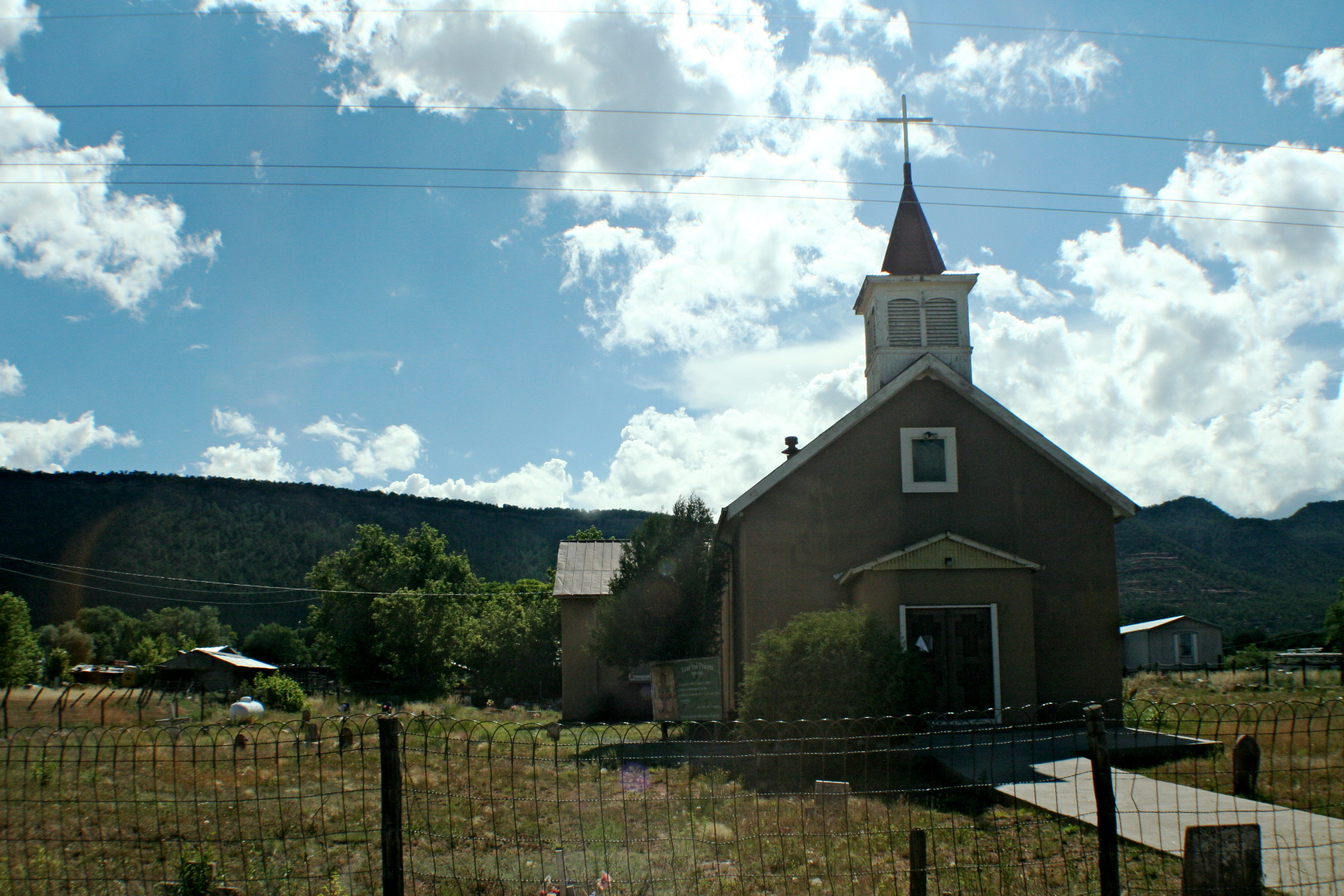
- Church in Rowe, July 2010

- Location in New Mexico Location in the United States
- Coordinates: 35°29′52″N 105°40′19″W
- Country: United States
- State: New Mexico
- County: San Miguel

Area
  - Total: 6.11 sq mi (15.83 km^{2})
  - Land: 6.11 sq mi (15.83 km^{2})
  - Water: 0 sq mi (0.00 km^{2})
- Elevation: 6,785 ft (2,068 m)

Population (2020)
  - Total: 304
  - Density: 50/sq mi (19.2/km^{2})
- Time zone: UTC-7 (Mountain (MST))
  - Summer (DST): UTC-6 (MDT)
- FIPS code: 35-65000
- GNIS feature ID: 2629123

Rowe is a census-designated place (CDP) in San Miguel County, New Mexico, United States. As of the 2020 census, Rowe had a population of 304.

The CDP is located along Interstate 25 near the Pecos National Historical Park.

== History ==
Rowe was established to provide labor for the Santa Fe Railroad in the late 1870s and early 1880s. The majority of the population came from Las Ruedas 2 miles (3.2 km) away on the Pecos River. A pipeline to provide water for steam engines was laid between Rowe and the then village of Las Ruedas. Las Ruedas ceased to exist and by the time of the 1880 U.S. Federal Census most of the former residents of Las Ruedas were resettled in Rowe.

The old Las Ruedas townsite is privately owned.

== Demographics ==
Historical population
Census	Pop.	Note	%±
2020	304		—
U.S. Decennial Census

== Education ==
It is within Pecos Independent Schools.

As of 2001 a bookmobile served the community but it had no permanent library facility.

The Native American Preparatory School operated in the nearby area, in proximity to South San Ysidro, from 1995 until it closed in 2002.

== See also ==
- List of census-designated places in New Mexico
