= Pecos National Historical Park =

National Historical Park of the United States

- U.S. National Register of Historic Places
- U.S. National Historic Landmark
- U.S. National Monument
- U.S. National Historical Park
- NM State Register of Cultural Properties
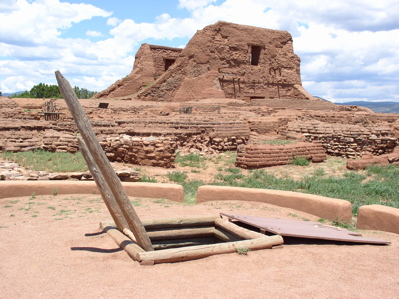
- Pecos Pueblo Mission Church

- Location within New Mexico Location within the United States
- Location: NM 63 SW of jct. with NM 50, Pecos, New Mexico
- Coordinates: 35°33′00″N 105°41′4″W
- Area: 6,671.4 acres (2,699.8 ha)
- Built: Start date ~A.D. 1300
- Architectural style: Stone Masonry w/adobe mortar
- Visitation: 37,083 (2025)
- Website: Pecos National Historical Park
- NRHP reference No.: 66000485 (original); 91000822 (increase)
- NMSRCP No.: 74

Significant dates
- Added to NRHP: October 15, 1966
- Boundary increase: July 2, 1991
- Designated NHL: October 9, 1960
- Designated NMON: June 28, 1965
- Designated NHP: July 2, 1991
- Designated NMSRCP: May 21, 1971

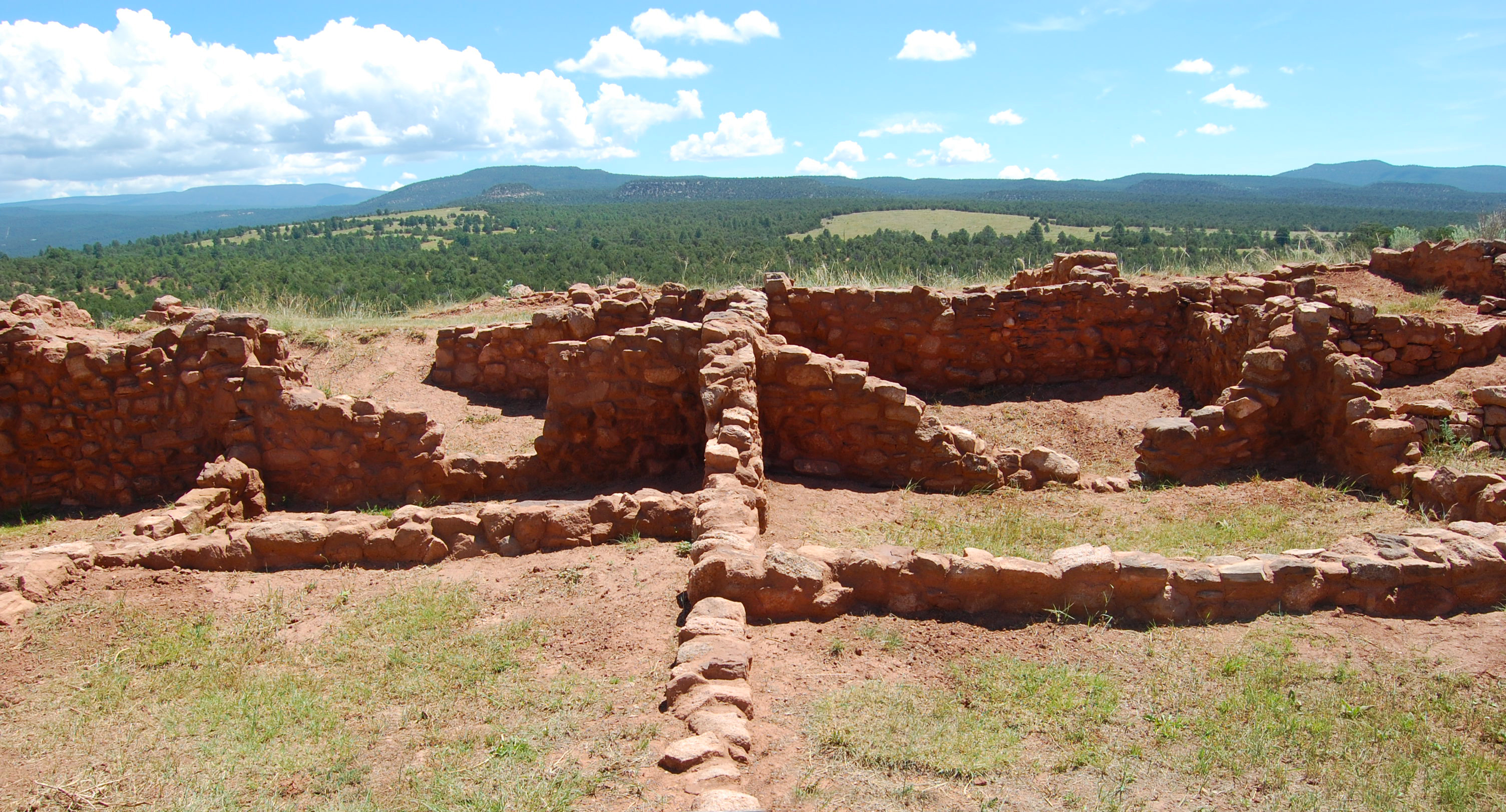
Ruins of the Pecos Pueblo at the Pecos National Historic Site

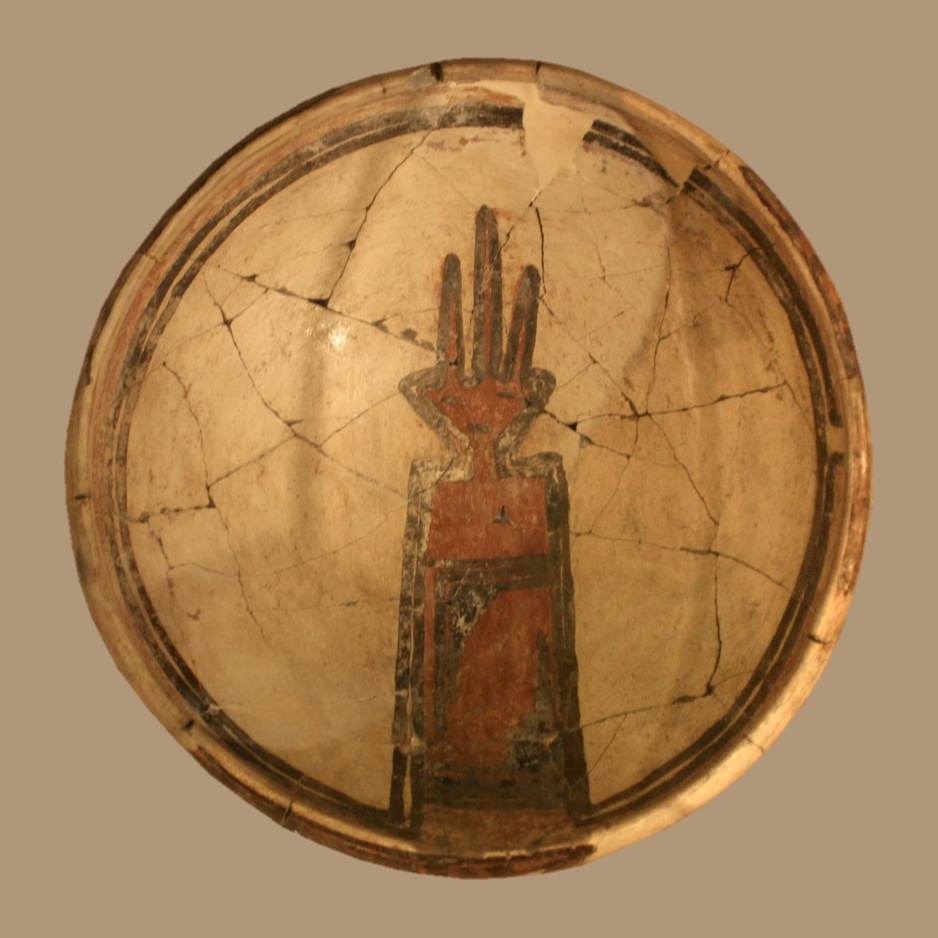
Pecos Glazeware bowl from the early Spanish era, displayed in the Park museum.

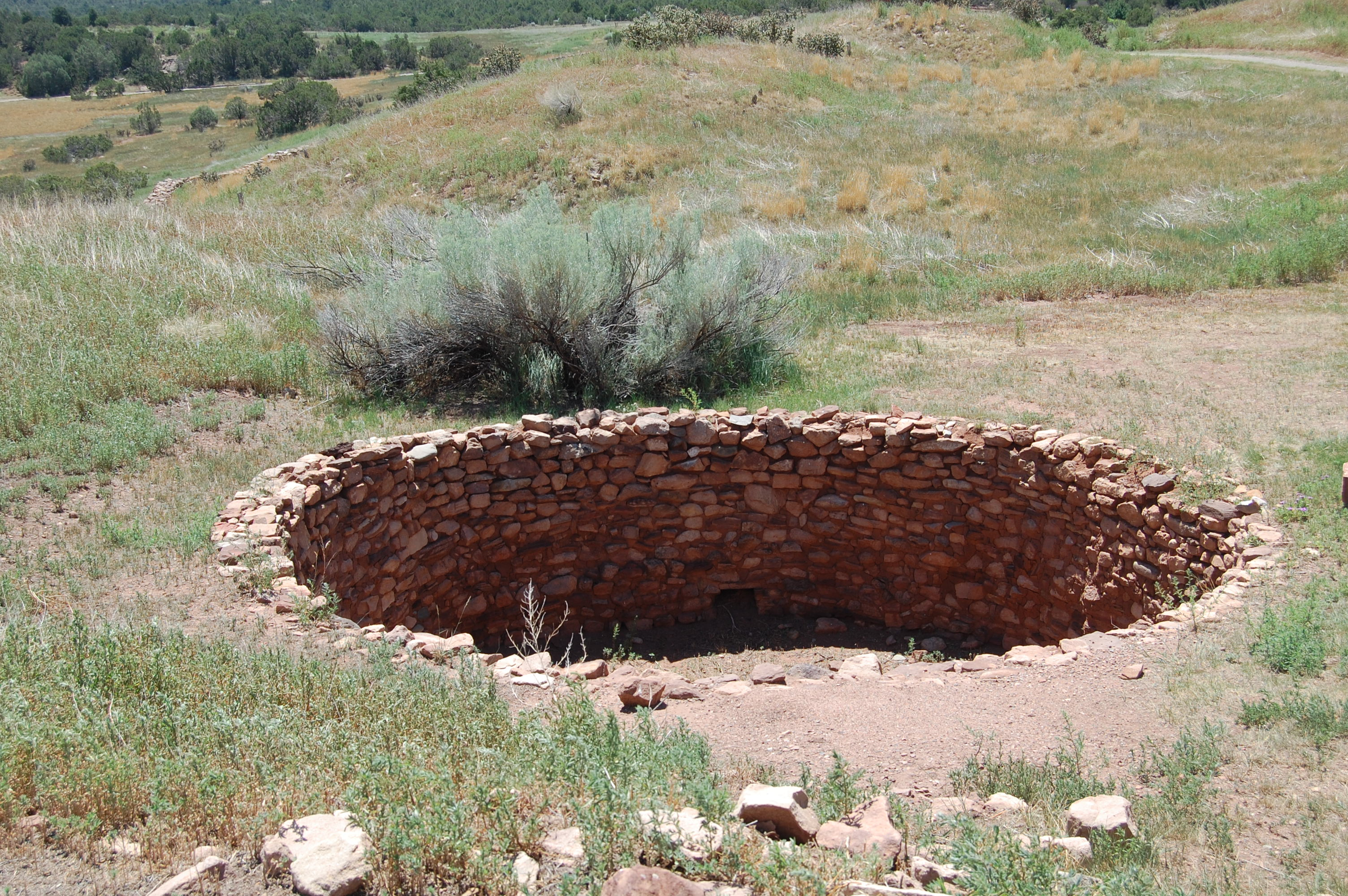
Ruins of a ceremonial kiva at Cicuye (Pecos Pueblo)

Pecos National Historical Park is a United States National Historical Park in San Miguel County, New Mexico. The park, operated by the National Park Service, encompasses thousands of acres of landscape infused with historical elements from prehistoric archaeological ruins to 19th-century ranches, to a battlefield of the American Civil War. Its largest single feature is Pecos Pueblo also known as Cicuye Pueblo, a Native American community abandoned in historic times. First a state monument in 1935, it was made Pecos National Monument in 1965, and greatly enlarged and renamed in 1990. Two sites within the park, the pueblo and the Glorieta Pass Battlefield, are National Historic Landmarks.

== Features ==
Pecos National Historical Park's main unit is located in western San Miguel County, about 17 miles (27 km) east of Santa Fe and just south of Pecos.

=== Pecos Pueblo ===
The main unit of the park preserves the ruins of Pecos Pueblo (Jemez: P’ǽ Kilâ, Tewa: Ch’ųngeh Ówîngeh Kayyee), known historically as Cicuye (Pecos: K’ǎk’orǎ, sometimes spelled Ciquique), the "village of 500 warriors". The first Pecos pueblo was one of two dozen rock-and-mud villages built in the valley around AD 1100 in the prehistoric Pueblo II Era. Within 350 years the Pueblo IV Era Pecos village had grown to house more than 2,000 people in its five-storied complex.

The people who lived at Cicuye/Pecos Pueblo may have spoke Towa, although the limited corpus of their language can only confirm that they spoke a Tanoan language. While often linked to the Jemez people, some lines of evidence, including phenotypic traits and shrine characteristics, have led to the suggestion that they were closer to the southern Tewa.

The Pecos people enjoyed a rich culture with inventive architecture and beautiful crafts. They also possessed an elaborate religious life, evidenced by the remains of over 20 ceremonial subterranean kivas. Some of the kivas have diameters as large as 40 feet and are 10 feet deep, accessed by wooden ladders. Farming was a main part of their diet and staple crops included the usual beans, corn, and squash. Their location, power and ability to supply goods made the Pecos a major trade center in the eastern part of the Puebloan territory, connecting the Pueblos to the Plains cultures such as the Comanche. There are seven distinct periods of their occupancy beginning with the Preceramic Period (11,500 B.C.E. - 600 C.E.) Ancestral Puebloan Paleo-Indians.

Emigration of Pecos people to other areas, encroachment of Hispanic settlers in the area, outbreaks of smallpox, and problems with Plains Indians caused the site to decline. The last 17 (or 20) inhabitants abandoned Pecos Pueblo in 1838, moving to the Jemez Pueblo following a failed attempt to resettle at Sandia.

The historical Pecos people produced, used or traded seven types of ceramic ware during their occupancy of the area. These are known as Rio Grande Greyware (plain and corrugated), Pajarito White Ware, Rio Grande Glaze Ware, Historic polychromes, Historic plain ware, White Mountain Red Ware, and Plains Apache Ware. Many of these were decorated with black, red or polychrome designs.

=== Spanish mission ===
The main unit of the park also protects the remains of Mission Nuestra Señora de los Ángeles de Porciúncula de los Pecos, a Spanish mission near the pueblo built in the early 17th century. A 1.25-mile (2 km) self-guiding trail begins at the nearby visitor center and winds through the ruins of Pecos Pueblo and the mission church.

Pecos was visited by expeditionaries with Francisco Vásquez de Coronado in 1540. The Spanish mission church was built in 1619. A traditional kiva was built in front of the church during the Pueblo Revolt in 1680 as a rejection of the Christian religion brought by Spanish colonists. However, when the Spanish returned in 1692, the Pecos community stayed on friendly terms with them, and a new, smaller church was built in 1717.

=== Forked Lightning Ranch ===
Another part of the park is the Forked Lightning Ranch, a cattle ranch established in the 1920s by Tex Austin, a famous producer of rodeos. It was headquartered at the Kozlowski's Stage Stop and Tavern, a stagecoach stop on the Santa Fe Trail that had also served as a Union forces encampment before the Battle of Glorieta Pass. It was only a cattle ranch for a time before Austin converted it into a dude ranch which he promoted to Easterners. The main ranch was designed by John Gaw Meem in the Pueblo Revival style of architecture. Austin's heavily mortgaged endeavour failed, closing in 1933. In 1936 the ranch again became a working cattle ranch, and in 1941 it was purchased by Buddy Fogelson, a Texas oilman who married actress Greer Garson. After her husband died, Garson sold her share of the park in 1991 to a conservation group, which donated it to the Park Service.

=== Old Santa Fe Trail ===
Portions of the historic Santa Fe Trail run through all units of the park. This rutted wagon trail was one of the major routes by which the American Southwest grew in the 19th century.

=== Glorieta Pass Battlefield ===
The Battle of Glorieta Pass was fought March 26–28, 1862 in the mountain pass west of Pecos Pueblo, along the route of the Old Santa Fe Trail. Confederate forces were en route to take Union-controlled Fort Union, and were fought to a standoff by militia raised in the New Mexico and Colorado Territories. Although parts of the battlefield have been compromised by highway construction, two sections of the battlefield have been preserved by the Park Service on either side of the pass. Public access to these units is limited by the National Park Service.

== Administrative history ==
Pecos Pueblo and an area of 341 acres (138 ha) was acquired by the state and preserved as a state monument in 1935. In 1965, President Lyndon Johnson established Pecos National Monument over the same area, and control was turned over the Park Service. In 1990 the main unit of the park was expanded to more than 6,000 acres (24 km^{2}), including a large area of ranchland and archaeologically sensitive landscapes. The two units of the Glorieta Pass Battlefield were formally added to the park in 1993.

== Climate ==
According to the Köppen Climate Classification system, the area has an oceanic climate, abbreviated "Cfb" on climate maps. The hottest temperature recorded was 100 °F (37.8 °C) on June 26, 1994, and July 18, 2023, while the coldest temperature recorded was −29 °F (−33.9 °C) on February 1, 1951.

Climate data for Pecos National Monument, New Mexico, 1991–2020 normals, extremes 1919–present. Elevation 6,878 ft (2,096 m).
Month	Jan	Feb	Mar	Apr	May	Jun	Jul	Aug	Sep	Oct	Nov	Dec	Year
Record high °F (°C)	75 (24)	75 (24)	81 (27)	87 (31)	97 (36)	100 (38)	100 (38)	96 (36)	95 (35)	86 (30)	82 (28)	77 (25)	100 (38)
Mean maximum °F (°C)	61.2 (16.2)	63.2 (17.3)	71.1 (21.7)	76.9 (24.9)	85.4 (29.7)	94.7 (34.8)	94.3 (34.6)	91.0 (32.8)	87.2 (30.7)	79.8 (26.6)	69.5 (20.8)	61.9 (16.6)	96.3 (35.7)
Mean daily maximum °F (°C)	46.6 (8.1)	49.6 (9.8)	57.1 (13.9)	64.3 (17.9)	73.4 (23.0)	83.9 (28.8)	85.2 (29.6)	82.7 (28.2)	77.6 (25.3)	66.7 (19.3)	54.6 (12.6)	46.7 (8.2)	65.7 (18.7)
Daily mean °F (°C)	32.3 (0.2)	35.5 (1.9)	41.3 (5.2)	47.7 (8.7)	56.3 (13.5)	65.9 (18.8)	69.4 (20.8)	67.5 (19.7)	61.3 (16.3)	50.6 (10.3)	39.8 (4.3)	32.2 (0.1)	50.0 (10.0)
Mean daily minimum °F (°C)	18.0 (−7.8)	21.4 (−5.9)	25.5 (−3.6)	31.1 (−0.5)	39.1 (3.9)	48.0 (8.9)	53.6 (12.0)	52.3 (11.3)	45.1 (7.3)	34.5 (1.4)	25.0 (−3.9)	17.8 (−7.9)	34.3 (1.3)
Mean minimum °F (°C)	0.0 (−17.8)	5.0 (−15.0)	9.1 (−12.7)	17.4 (−8.1)	26.2 (−3.2)	37.5 (3.1)	46.7 (8.2)	44.6 (7.0)	33.2 (0.7)	18.3 (−7.6)	7.4 (−13.7)	−0.6 (−18.1)	−4.8 (−20.4)
Record low °F (°C)	−27 (−33)	−29 (−34)	−18 (−28)	−6 (−21)	14 (−10)	18 (−8)	35 (2)	28 (−2)	20 (−7)	−2 (−19)	−23 (−31)	−19 (−28)	−29 (−34)
Average precipitation inches (mm)	0.68 (17)	0.62 (16)	0.74 (19)	0.72 (18)	1.01 (26)	1.23 (31)	3.23 (82)	3.03 (77)	1.71 (43)	1.20 (30)	1.03 (26)	0.97 (25)	16.17 (410)
Average snowfall inches (cm)	6.3 (16)	4.4 (11)	3.0 (7.6)	1.0 (2.5)	0.0 (0.0)	0.0 (0.0)	0.0 (0.0)	0.0 (0.0)	0.0 (0.0)	0.6 (1.5)	3.7 (9.4)	7.3 (19)	26.3 (67)
Average precipitation days (≥ 0.01 in)	3.7	4.0	4.0	3.9	4.2	5.3	12.6	12.3	6.5	5.4	3.6	3.8	69.3
Average snowy days (≥ 0.1 in)	2.6	2.0	1.2	0.9	0.0	0.0	0.0	0.0	0.0	0.4	1.3	2.0	10.4
Source 1: NOAA
Source 2: National Weather Service

== See also ==
- Hispanic Heritage Site
- National Register of Historic Places listings in San Miguel County, New Mexico
- National Register of Historic Places listings in Santa Fe County, New Mexico
- List of National Historic Landmarks in New Mexico
- List of national monuments of the United States
- List of national historical parks
