= Pecos, New Mexico =

- Village
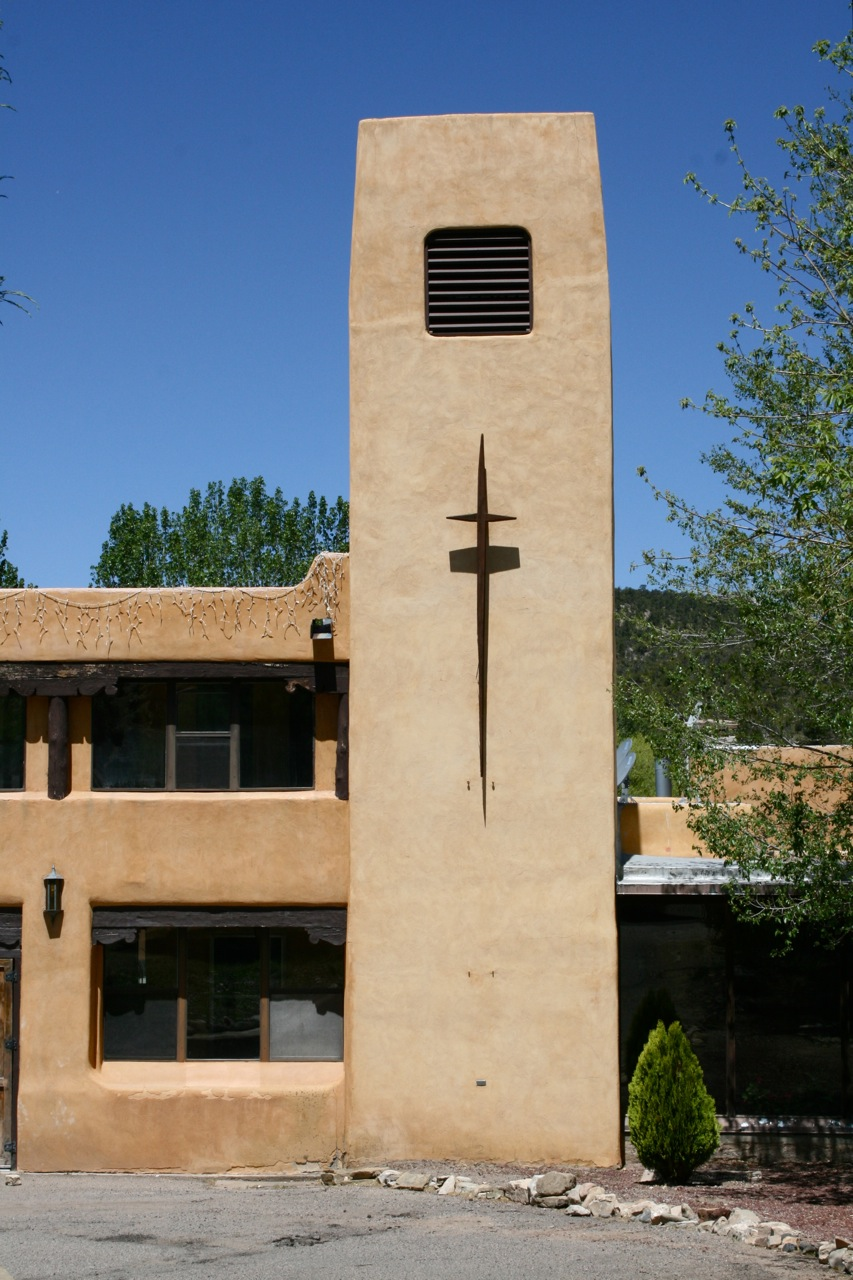
- Our Lady of Guadalupe Benedictine Abbey near Pecos

- Location of Pecos, New Mexico

- Location in the United States Pecos, New Mexico (New Mexico)
- Coordinates: 35°34′33″N 105°40′42″W
- Country: United States
- State: New Mexico
- County: San Miguel

Area
  - Total: 1.78 sq mi (4.60 km^{2})
  - Land: 1.78 sq mi (4.60 km^{2})
  - Water: 0 sq mi (0.00 km^{2})
- Elevation: 6,992 ft (2,131 m)

Population (2020)
  - Total: 1,392
  - Density: 784.1/sq mi (302.76/km^{2})
- Time zone: UTC-7 (Mountain (MST))
  - Summer (DST): UTC-6 (MDT)
- ZIP code: 87552
- Area code: 505
- FIPS code: 35-55620
- GNIS feature ID: 2413576
- Website: villageofpecos.com

Pecos is a village in San Miguel County, New Mexico, United States. As of the 2020 census, Pecos had a population of 1,392. The village has been shrinking slower than other parts of San Miguel County, partly because Pecos is within commuting distance of Santa Fe. The village is built along the Pecos River, which flows from the north out of the Santa Fe National Forest. Notable locations nearby include Pecos National Historical Park, Glorieta Pass, and Pecos Benedictine Monastery. It is also an entry point for hunting, fishing, hiking and camping in the Pecos Wilderness. The closest metropolitan area is the Santa Fe metropolitan area, approximately 26 miles (42 km) to the west.

== Geography ==
According to the United States Census Bureau, the village has a total area of 1.7 square miles (4.4 km^{2}), all land.

== Demographics ==
Historical population
Census	Pop.	Note	%±
1880	241		—
1960	584		—
1970	598		2.4%
1980	885		48.0%
1990	1,012		14.4%
2000	1,441		42.4%
2010	1,392		−3.4%
2020	1,392		0.0%
U.S. Decennial Census

As of the census of 2000, there were 1,441 people, 542 households, and 383 families residing in the village. The population density was 830.3 inhabitants per square mile (320.6/km^{2}). There were 628 housing units at an average density of 361.9 per square mile (139.7/km^{2}). The racial makeup of the village was 48.91% White, 0.21% African American, 1.39% Native American, 0.21% Pacific Islander, 26.51% from other races, and 2.78% from two or more races. Hispanic or Latino of any race were 80.08% of the population.

There were 542 households, out of which 39.3% had children under the age of 18 living with them, 49.1% were married couples living together, 14.9% had a female householder with no husband present, and 29.2% were non-families. 24.2% of all households were made up of individuals, and 6.1% had someone living alone who was 65 years of age or older. The average household size was 2.63 and the average family size was 3.15.

In the village, the population was spread out, with 29.7% under the age of 18, 10.1% from 18 to 24, 29.6% from 25 to 44, 21.8% from 45 to 64, and 8.8% who were 65 years of age or older. The median age was 32 years. For every 100 females, there were 99.3 males. For every 100 females age 18 and over, there were 99.0 males.

The median income for a household in the village was $30,549, and the median income for a family was $33,828. Males had a median income of $28,625 versus $22,500 for females. The per capita income for the village was $13,306. About 13.0% of families and 15.9% of the population were below the poverty line, including 19.2% of those under age 18 and 22.6% of those age 65 or over.

== Education ==
Pecos Independent Schools serves the Village of Pecos as well as rural areas in western San Miguel County.
