= Camino Real de Tierra Adentro =

Road in North America

Coordinates: 22°36′29″N 102°22′45″W

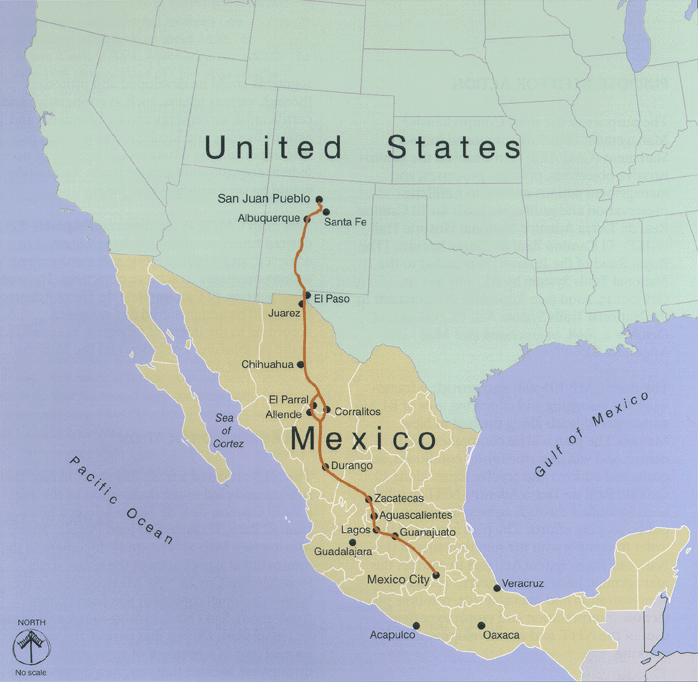
- Map of El Camino Real de Tierra Adentro
- Interactive map of Camino Real de Tierra Adentro
- Location: Mexico and the United States
- Governing body: Instituto Nacional de Antropología e Historia (Mexico); National Park Service, Bureau of Land Management (United States)
- Website: El Camino Real de Tierra Adentro National Historic Trail

UNESCO World Heritage Site
- Location: Mexico
- Criteria: Cultural: (ii), (iv)
- Reference: 1351
- Inscription: 2010 (34th Session)
- Area: 3,101.91 ha (7,665.0 acres)
- Buffer zone: 268,057.2 ha (662,384 acres)

El Camino Real de Tierra Adentro (English: The Royal Road of the Interior Land), also known as the Silver Route, was a Spanish 2,560-kilometer-long (1,590 mi) road between Mexico City and San Juan Pueblo (Ohkay Owingeh), New Mexico (in the modern U.S.), that was used from 1598 to 1882. It was the northernmost of the four major "royal roads" that linked Mexico City to its major tributaries during and after the Spanish colonial era.

In 2010, 55 sites and five existing UNESCO World Heritage Sites along the Mexican section of the route were collectively added to the World Heritage List, including historic cities, towns, bridges, haciendas, and other monuments along the 1,400-kilometer (870 mi) route between the Historic Center of Mexico City (also a World Heritage Site on its own) and the town of Valle de Allende, Chihuahua.

The 650-kilometer (404 mi) section of the route within the United States was proclaimed the El Camino Real de Tierra Adentro National Historic Trail, a part of the National Historic Trail system, on October 13, 2000. The historic route is overseen by both the National Park Service and the U.S. Bureau of Land Management with aid from the El Camino Real de Tierra Adentro Trail Association. A portion of the trail near San Acacia, New Mexico, was listed on the U.S. National Register of Historic Places in 2014.

== Route ==
The road is identified as beginning at the Plaza Santo Domingo very close to the present Zócalo and Mexico City Metropolitan Cathedral in Mexico City. Traveling north through San Miguel de Allende, Guanajuato, the road's northern terminus is located at Ohkay Owingeh, New Mexico.

== History ==
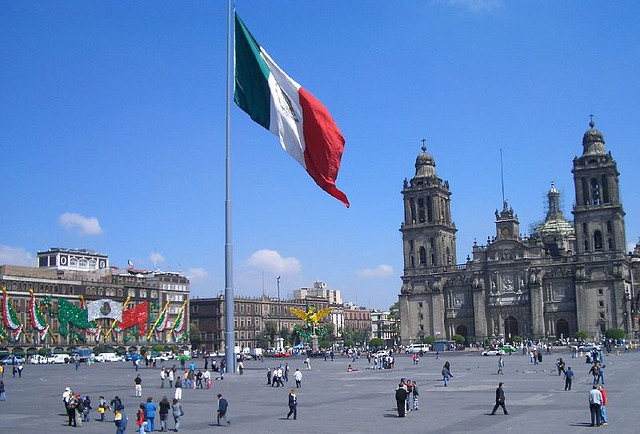
Zócalo (Plaza de la Constitución), in the historic center of Mexico City.

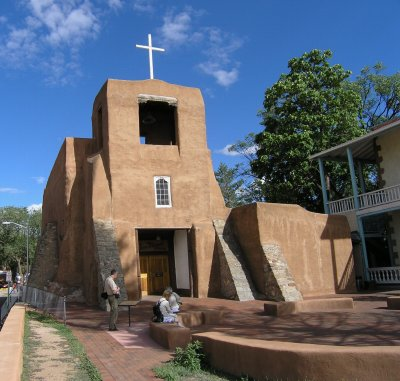
The Spanish Mission of San Miguel in Santa Fe, New Mexico, is the oldest church in the United States.

=== Pre-Columbian history ===
Long before Europeans arrived, the various indigenous tribes and kingdoms that had arisen throughout the north-central steppe of Mexico had established the route that would later become the Camino Real de Tierra Adentro as a major thoroughfare for hunting and trading. The route connected the peoples of the Valley of Mexico with those of the north through the exchange of products such as turquoise, obsidian, salt, and feathers. By 1000 AD, a flourishing trade network existed from Mesoamerica to the Rocky Mountains.

=== European incursion ===
After Tenochtitlan was subdued in 1521, Spanish conquistadores and colonists began a series of expeditions with the purpose of expanding their domains and obtaining greater wealth for the Spanish Crown. Their initial efforts led them to follow the trails established by the natives, who exchanged goods between the north and the south.

In April 1598, a group of military scouts led by Juan de Oñate, the newly appointed colonial governor of the province of Santa Fe de Nuevo México, became lost in the desert south of Paso del Norte while seeking the best route to the Río del Norte. A local Indian they had captured named Mompil drew in the sand a map of the only safe passage to the river. The group arrived at the Río del Norte just south of present-day El Paso and Ciudad Juárez in late April, where they celebrated the Catholic Feast of the Ascension on April 30, before crossing the river. They then mapped and extended the route to what is now Española, where Oñate would establish the capital of the new province. This trail became the Camino Real de Tierra Adentro, the northernmost of the four main "royal roads" – the Caminos Reales – that linked Mexico City to its major tributaries in Acapulco, Veracruz, Audiencia (Guatemala), and Santa Fe.

After the Pueblo Revolt of 1680, which violently forced the Spanish out of Nuevo México, the Spanish Crown decided not to abandon the province altogether, but instead it maintained a channel to the province so as not to completely abandon its subjects remaining there. The Viceroyalty organized a system, the so-called conducta, to supply the missions, presidios, and northern ranchos. The conducta consisted of wagon caravans that departed every three years from Mexico City to Santa Fe along the Camino Real de Tierra Adentro. The trip required a long and difficult journey of six months, including two to three weeks of rest along the way.

Many were the uncertainties that the conducta and other travelers faced. River floods could force weeks of waiting on the banks until the caravan could wade across. At other times, prolonged droughts in the area could make water scarce and difficult to find. The most feared section of the journey was the crossing of the Jornada del Muerto beyond El Paso del Norte, nearly 100 km (62 mi) of expansive, barren desert without any water sources for the men and beasts.

Beyond the sustenance needs, the greatest danger to the caravan was that of local assaults. Groups of bandits roamed throughout the territory and threatened the caravan from the current state of Mexico to the state of Querétaro, seeking articles of value. And from the southern part of Zacatecas onward to the north, the greatest threat was the native Chichimecas, who became more likely to attack as the caravan progressed further north. The main objective of the Chichimecas was horses, but they also often took women and children. A series of presidios along the way allowed for relays of troops to provide additional protection to the caravans. At night in the most dangerous areas, the caravans would form a circle with their wagons with the people and animals inside.

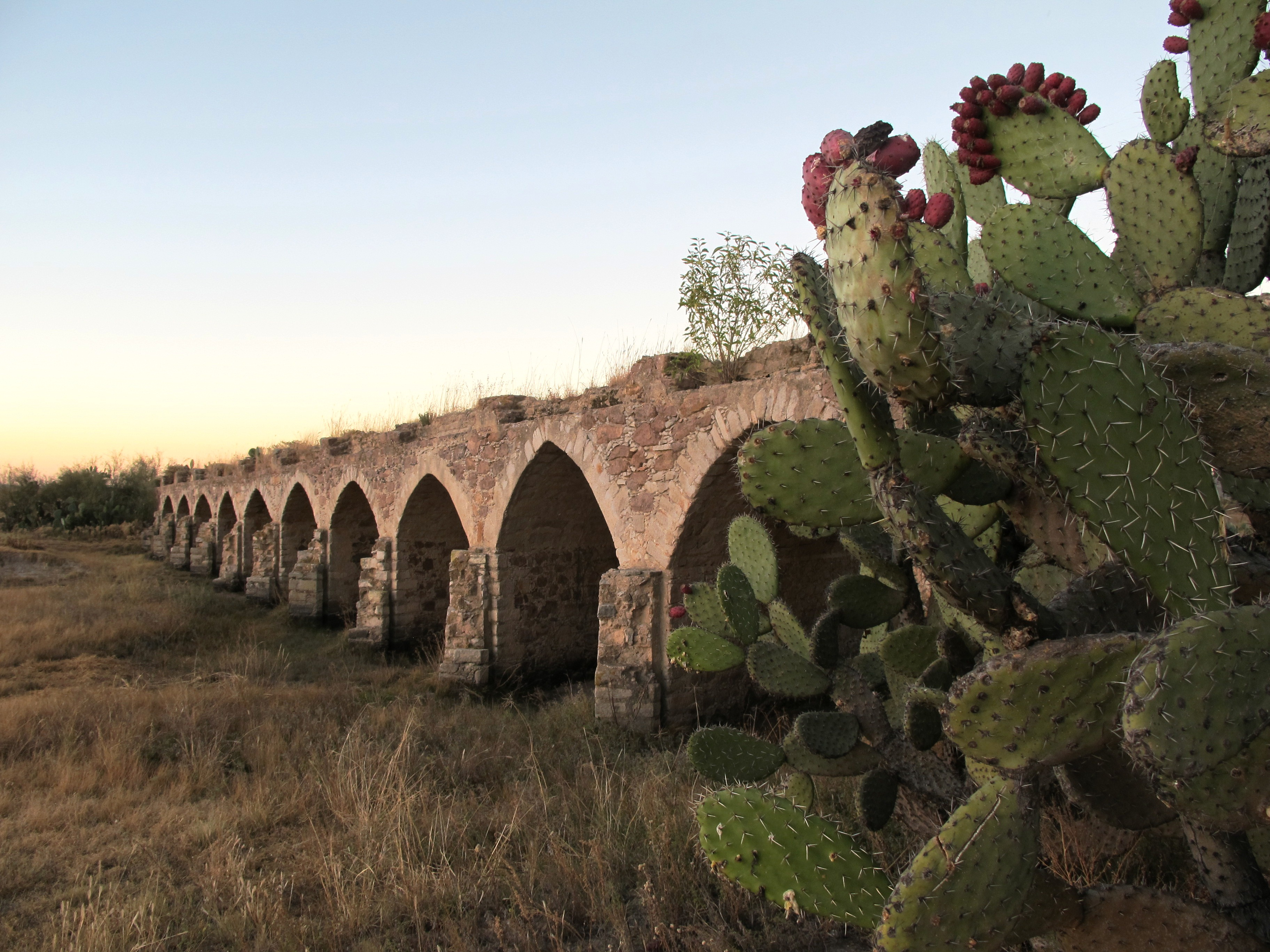
Bridge of Ojuelos in the state of Jalisco, part of the Camino Real de Tierra Adentro, a declared UNESCO World Heritage Site along with 59 other sites on the route

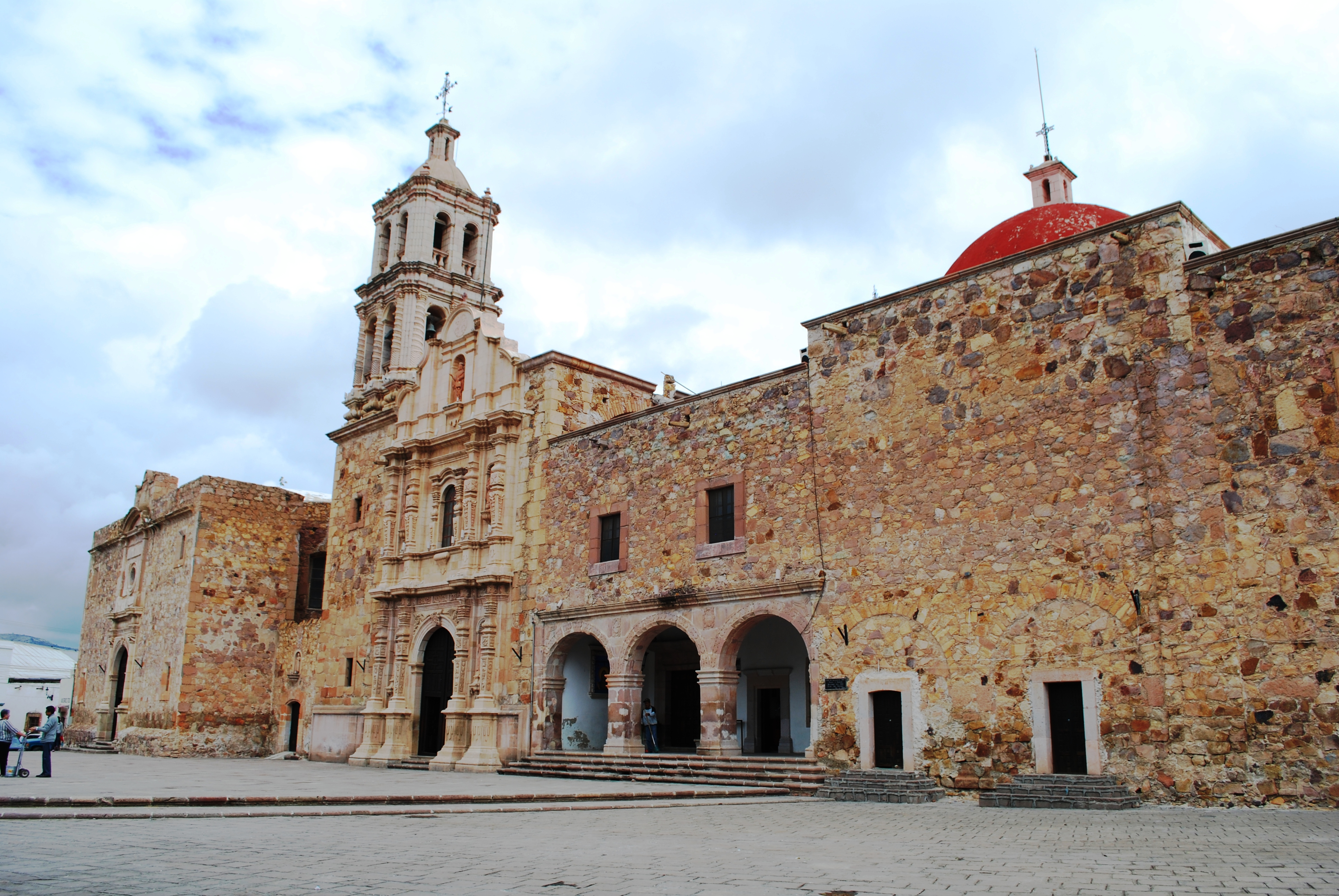
Plaza de San Francisco square, where the Templo de la Tercera Orden and the Templo y Convento de San Francisco, whose construction began in 1567, are in the city of Sombrerete, Zacatecas. Spanish influence mixed with local elements is visible, such as the management of the pink quarry or the Tlaxcaltec elements at the entrance of the temple.

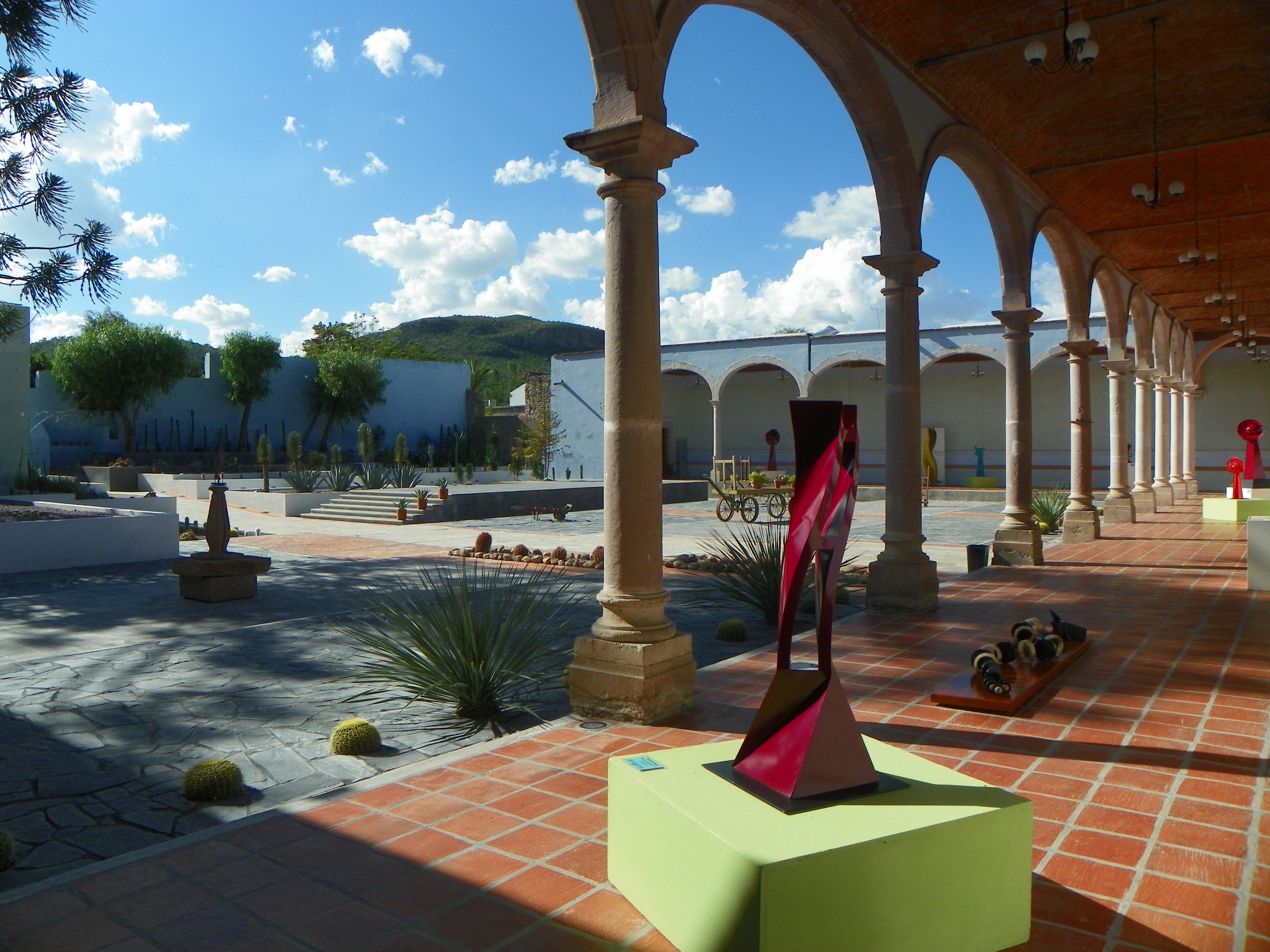
Hacienda de San Blas, in the town of Pabellón de Hidalgo, is a 16th-century hacienda, now maintained as a Museum of the Insurgency. It is a good example of the agricultural haciendas that fed the Camino Real de Tierra Adentro.

The Camino Real was actively used as a commercial route for more than 300 years, from the middle of the 16th century to the 19th century, mainly for the transport of silver extracted from northern mines. During this time, the road was continuously improved, and over time, the risks became smaller as haciendas and population centers emerged.

=== 18th century ===
During the 18th century, the sites along the Camino Real de Tierra Adentro increased significantly. The area between the villas of Durango and Santa Fe came to be known as "the Chihuahua Trail". The villa of San Felipe el Real (today city of Chihuahua), established in 1709 to support the surrounding mines, became the most important commercial center and financial area along this segment.

The villa of San Felipe Neri de Alburquerque (present-day Albuquerque, New Mexico) was founded in 1706 and it also became an important terminal. Because of its defensive position on the Camino Real, the Villa de Alburquerque became the center of commercial exchange between Nuevo México and the rest of New Spain during the 18th century, trading cattle, wool, textiles, animal skins, salt, and nuts. This exchange occurred mainly with the mining cities of Chihuahua, Santa Bárbara, and Parral.

El Paso del Norte (present-day Ciudad Juárez) became another major terminal on the route. In 1765, its population was estimated to be 2,635 inhabitants, which created what was then the largest urban center on the northern border of New Spain. El Paso del Norte became an important center of agriculture and rancheria, known for its wines, brandy, vinegar, and raisins.

In the 18th century, the Spanish Crown authorized the establishment of fairs along the Camino Real to promote commerce (although some form of these had already been existing for some time prior). Some of the most important fairs along the Camino Real included the Fair de San Juan de los Lagos in Jalisco, the Fair de Saltillo, and the Fair de Chihuahua, which was of great importance to Nuevo México merchants. The Fair de Taos was also an important annual event, wherein the Comanches and the Utes traded weapons, ammunition, horses, agricultural products, furs, and meats with the Spanish. Spain at the same time maintained a monopoly on the products of its northern provinces, thus no trade occurred with the French colony of Louisiana.

For the second half of the 18th century, the northern frontier of New Spain represented a fundamental interest for the Spanish Empire and its reformist policy, with the aim of ensuring Spanish sovereignty over its northern provinces, highly coveted geopolitically by other European powers – especially the English and French. The Spanish Crown labored to incorporate the natives into the social and economic welfare of its provinces and give them reasons to participate in the defense of the Spanish border.

Thus, Captain Nicolás de Lafora (assigned by the then Marqués de Rubí) gives a description of the frontier of New Spain in his "Viaje a los presidios internos de la América septentrional", the product of an expedition that took place between 1766 and 1768. This expedition was part of a larger commission on the defensive issues and military capabilities entrusted by the Spanish Crown to the Marquis of Rubí, to assess the tactical placement of the presidios, inspect troop readiness, review military regulations, and propose what might be done to strengthen the government and the defense of the State. From its review, the Marquis proposed a line of Presidios along the northern frontier of New Spain, to be established from the Gulf of Mexico to the Gulf of California to protect itself from the Utes, Apaches, Comanches, and Navajos. Don José de Gálvez, special commissioner to New Spain for Charles III, promoted a Comandancia General de las Provincias Internas (General Commander of the Internal Provinces) for the northern provinces of New Spain. However, he also recognized that a long war with the natives would be impossible to win or sustain due to the lack of military resources in the area. With that view, he himself promoted the establishment of a strong peace in the provinces and a greater commercial presence in 1779.

In 1786, the nephew of José de Gálvez, Bernardo de Gálvez, viceroy of New Spain, published his Instructions, which included three strategies for dealing with the natives: Continuing the military pressure on hostile and unaligned tribes, pursuing the formation of alliances with friendly tribes, and promoting economic dependency with those natives who had entered into peace treaties with the Spanish Crown.

In the last decade of the 18th century, a tenuous peace was achieved between the Spaniards and the Apache tribes as a result of the aforementioned administrative and strategic changes. As a consequence, commerce along the Camino Real greatly expanded with products from all over the world, including products from the other provinces of New Spain, brought in over land; European products brought in by the Spanish fleet; and even those that came from the Manila galleon that arrived annually at Acapulco from the western Pacific. As an example, for this time, the most typical products sold by the merchants in the city of Parral along the "Chihuahua Trail" included platoncillos from Michoacán, jarrillos from Cuautitlán of the State of Mexico, majolica from the State of Puebla, porcelain junks from China, and clay products from Guadalajara.

=== 19th century ===
The 19th century brought many changes for both Mexico and its northern border. From the Napoleonic Wars to the start of the Mexican War of Independence, the colonial government was unstable and struggled to continue sending resources to the northern provinces. This void led to the establishment of alternate suppliers and supply routes into those provinces. In 1807, American merchant and military agent Zebulon Pike was sent to explore the southwestern borders between the U.S. and New Spain with the intention to find a trail to bring U.S. commerce into Nuevo México and Nueva Vizcaya (Chihuahua). Pike was captured on 26 February 1807 by the Spanish authorities in northern Nuevo México, who sent him on the Camino Real to the city of Chihuahua for interrogation. While Pike was in this city, he gained access to several maps of México and learned of the discontent with Spanish domination.

In 1821, after 11 years of struggle, Mexico gained its independence from Spain. The Camino Real maintained an important role in this period, since travelers brought communication about the events that were taking place in the center of the country to the towns and villages of the internal provinces. During the Mexican War of Independence, the Camino Real was used by both rebels and royal forces. For example, after the liberator Miguel Hidalgo y Costilla launched the war of independence, he used the road to retreat from the Battle of the Bridge of Calderón fought on the banks of the Calderón River, 60 km (37 mi) east of Guadalajara in present-day Zapotlanejo, Jalisco, northward, eventually arriving at the Wells of Baján in Coahuila, where he was captured and executed by royal forces.

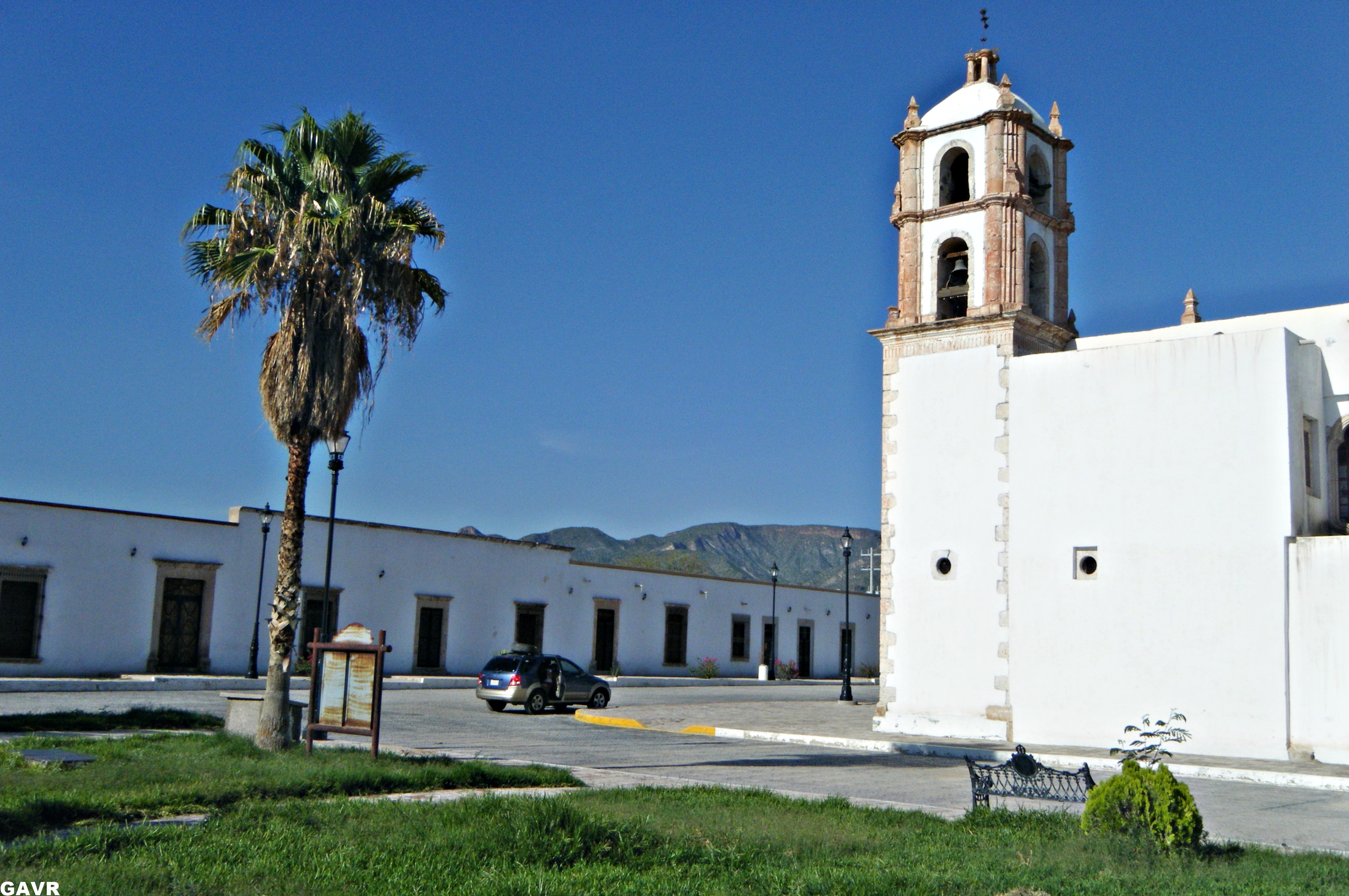
Templo de Nuestra Señora del Refugio, located in Hacienda La Pedriceña, in the now community of Los Cuatillos, in the municipality of Cuencamé, Durango. In this hacienda one can find Baroque paintings and multiple mansions that served to manage the property. The chapel of the hacienda was built in the 18th century. The Cry of Dolores celebrated every year in Mexico on 15 September to remember the call of independence given by Miguel Hidalgo was organized from this hacienda by President Benito Juárez in 1864.

Between 1821 and 1822, after the end of the war for the Independence of Mexico, the Santa Fe Trail was established to connect the U.S. territory of Missouri with Santa Fe. At first, U.S. merchants were arrested and imprisoned for bringing contraband into Mexican territory; however, the growing economic crisis in northern Mexico gave rise to an increased tolerance of this type of trade. In fact, the Santa Fe Trail (Sendero de Santa Fe) provided needed markets for local products (such as cotton) and manufactured products from New Mexico, so New Mexicans looked favorably on this new trade route. By 1827, a lucrative and commercial connection had been forged between Missouri, New Mexico, and Chihuahua.

In 1846, the dispute over the Texas-Mexico border with the U.S. gave rise to the subsequent invasion by U.S. military forces and the Mexican–American War began. One of these forces was commanded by the general Stephen Kearny, who traveled by the Santa Fe Trail to seize the capital of New Mexico. Another of the forces commanded by Colonel Alexander William Doniphan defeated a small group of Mexican contingents on the Camino Real in the Los Brazitos area south of what is now Las Cruces, New Mexico. Doniphan's forces went on to capture El Paso del Norte and later the city of Chihuahua. During 1846–1847, the Camino Real de Tierra Adentro became a path of continuous use, with American forces using it to travel into the interior of Mexico. On their journey, many American travelers kept journals and wrote home about what they saw as they travelled. One of the soldiers provided an estimate of the population of several cities along the Camino, including Algodones, New Mexico, with 1,000 inhabitants; Bernalillo with 500; Sandía Pueblo with 300 to 400, Albuquerque without an estimated number but extant for seven or eight miles along the Rio Grande; Rancho de los Placeres with 200 to 300; Tomé with 2,000; Socorro, described as a "considerable city"; Paso del Norte with 5,000 to 6,000; and Carrizal, Chihuahua, with 400 inhabitants. The soldiers even kept notes of the products, prices, and animals that they found on their journeys.

With the Treaty of Guadalupe Hidalgo signed in February 1848, the war officially ended, with Mexico ceding most of its northern territories to the U.S., including parts of what are now the U.S. states of New Mexico, Colorado, Arizona, and all of California, Nevada, and Utah.

== Uses of the name ==
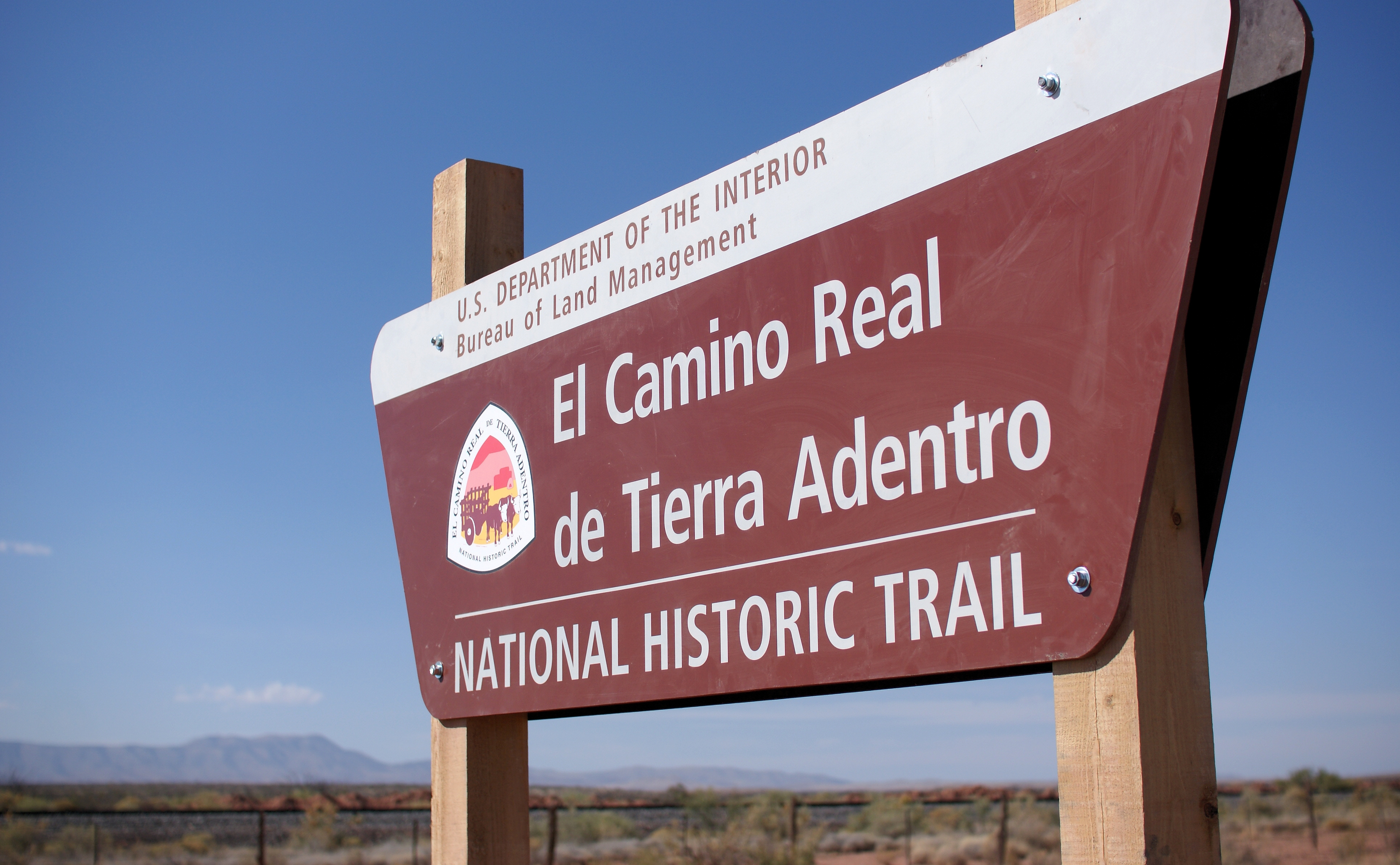
The section of the road that runs through U.S. territory, a total of 646 kilometres (401 mi), was declared a National Historic Trail in October 2000.

The name is sometimes a source of confusion, since during the Viceroyalty of New Spain, all roads passable by horse and cart were called caminos reales, and a significant number of roads throughout the viceroyalty bore this designation. Similarly, all of the interior territories outside of Mexico City were once called tierra adentro, and particularly the northern parts of the kingdom. This is why the portion of the road between Santiago de Querétaro and Saltillo was alternatively called La Puerta de Tierra Adentro (The Door of Tierra Adentro). Historically, several designated Caminos Reales de Tierra Adentro passed throughout New Spain, perhaps the second-most important one after the road to Santa Fe being the one that led out of Saltillo, Coahuila, to the province of Texas.

== World Heritage Site ==
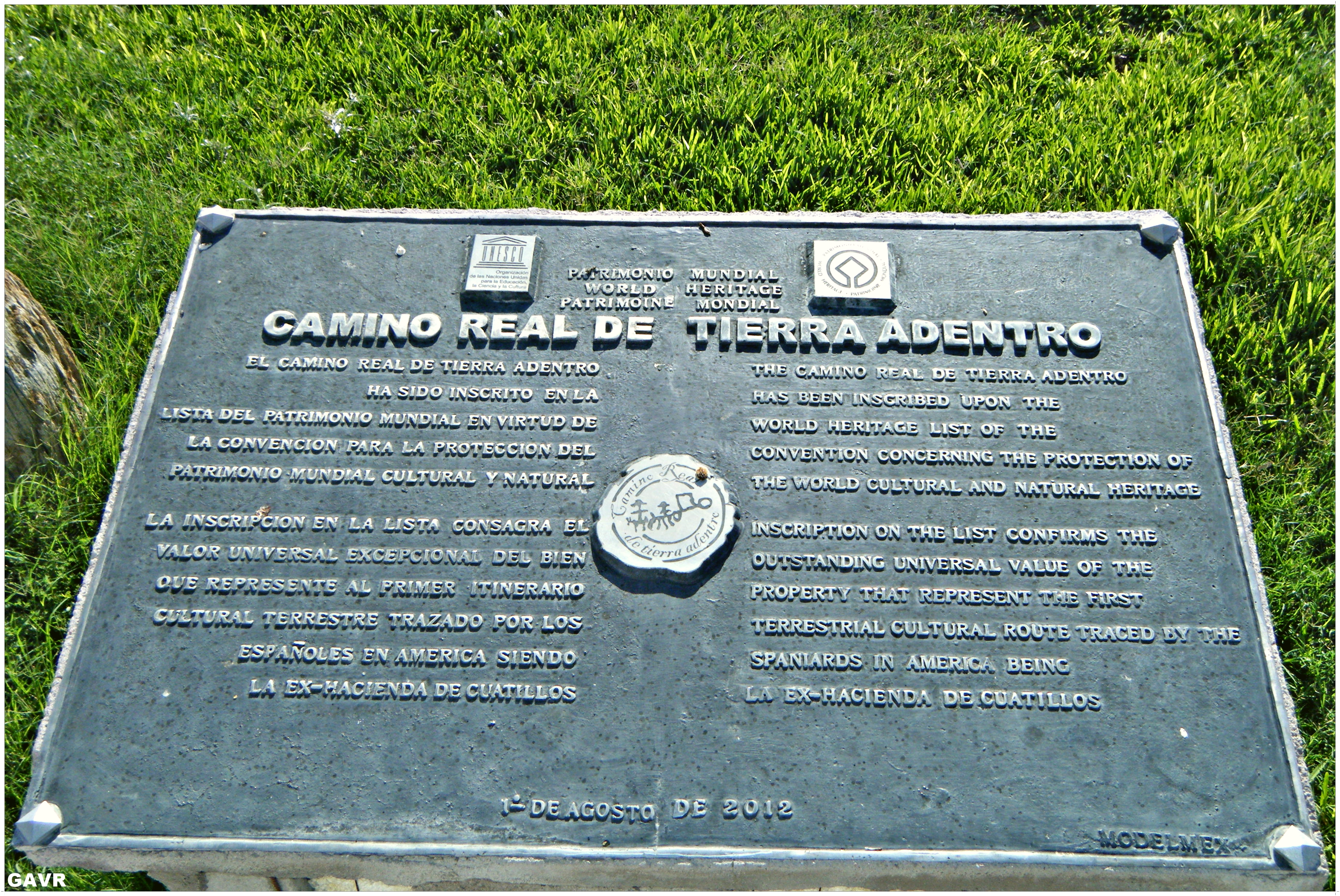
Plate awarded by UNESCO to the recognized sites of the section of the road that runs through Mexican territory

The section of the road that runs through Mexico was nominated to the UNESCO World Heritage List in November 2001, under cultural criteria i) "Representing a masterpiece of the creative genius of man" and ii) "Being the manifestation of a considerable exchange of influences, during a specific period or in a specific cultural area, in the development of architecture or technology, monumental arts, urban planning or landscape design". Criterion (iv), "Offering an eminent example of a type of building, architectural, technological or landscape, that illustrates a significant stage of human history" was added in 2010. On August 1, 2010, UNESCO designated this road as a World Heritage Site. The designation identified a core zone of 3,102 hectares with a buffer zone of 268,057 hectares distributed across 60 historical sites.

UNESCO identified or recognized 60 sites along the road in its declaration of the road being a World Heritage Site. Five of them (Mexico City, Querétaro, Guanajuato, San Miguel de Allende and Zacatecas) had been separately recognized in the past. The original historical route does not exactly match the route identified by UNESCO, since UNESCO's declaration omitted several sections such as the portions that ran north of Valle de Allende in Chihuahua and through the Hacienda de San Diego del Jaral de Berrio in Guanajuato, as well as the portion in the United States. For this reason, a possible expansion of the declaration has been proposed for the future. The Instituto Nacional de Antropología e Historia is conducting research to find and gather evidence for additional portions and sites of the original stretches of the historical road, such as bridges, pavements, haciendas, etc. that might be added to the original UNESCO designation.

=== Declared sites ===
==== Mexico City and State of Mexico ====
1351-000: Historic center of Mexico City.
1351-001: Old College of Templo de San Francisco Javier (Tepotzotlán) in Tepotzotlán.
1351-002: Aculco de Espinoza.
1351-003: Bridge of Atongo.

1351-004: Section of the Camino Real between Aculco de Espinoza and San Juan del Río.

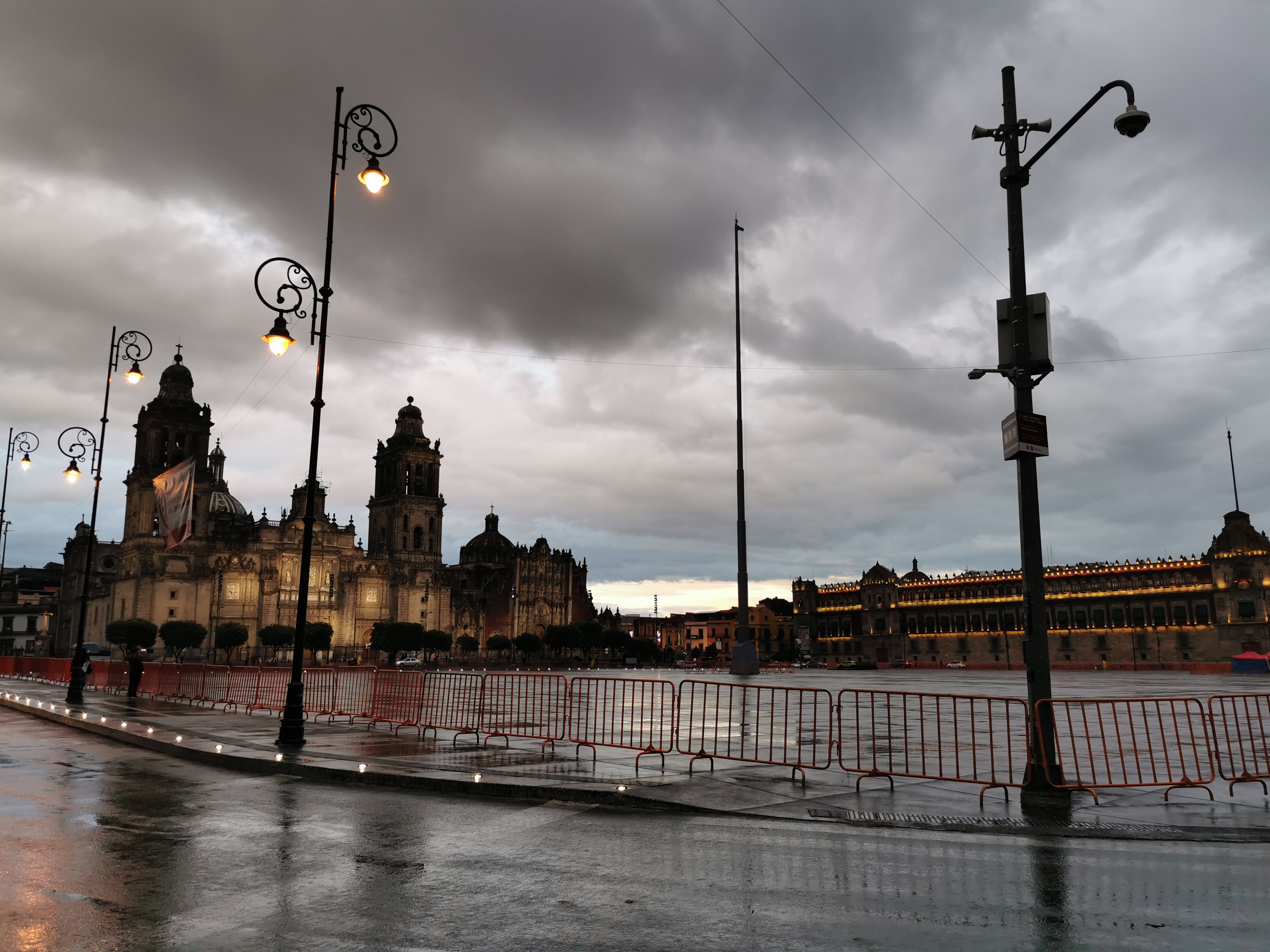
Mexico City.

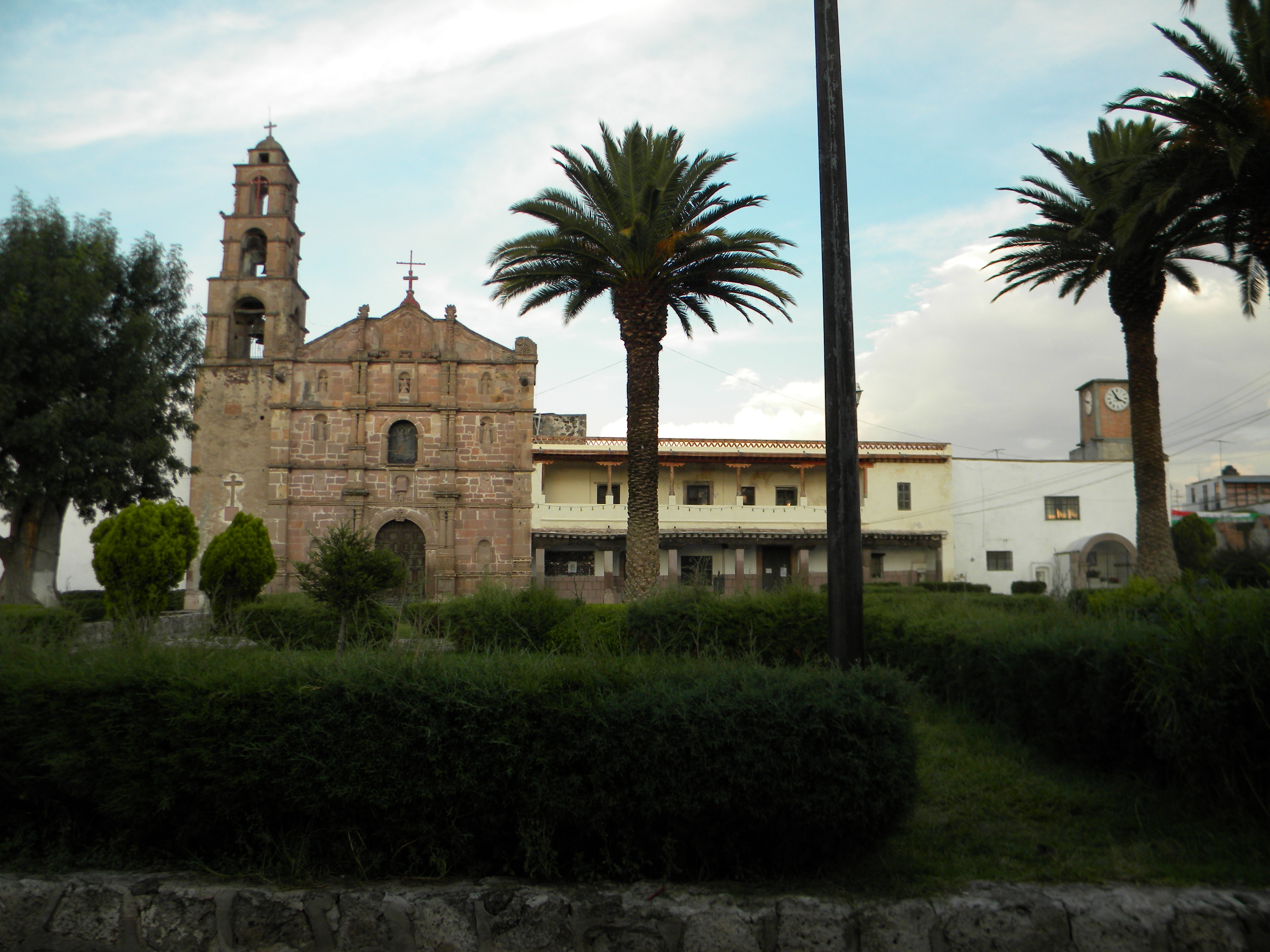
Church of San Jerónimo, Aculco de Espinoza.

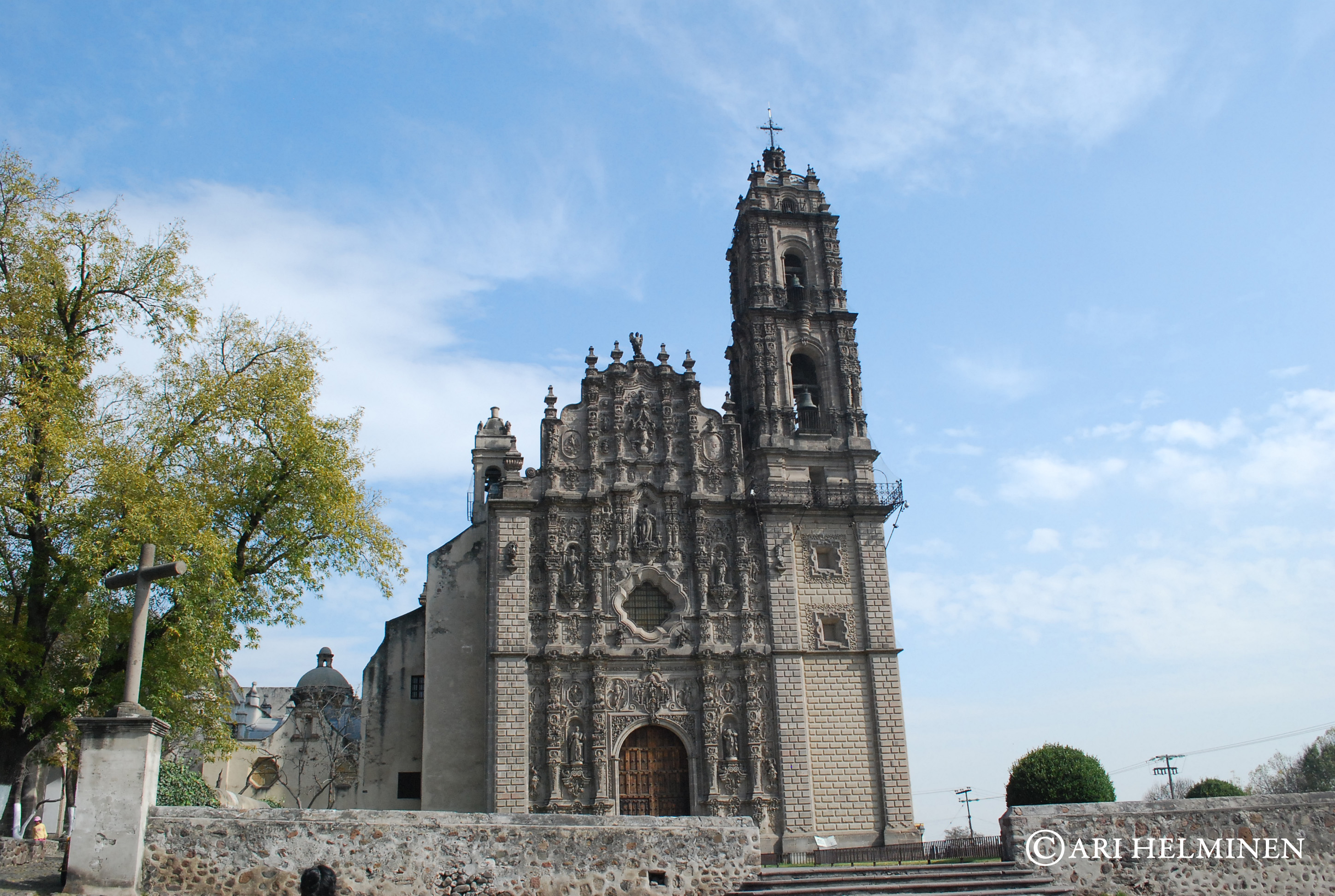
Old College of San Francisco Javier in Tepotzotlán.

==== State of Hidalgo ====
1351-005: Templo and exconvento de San Francisco in Tepeji del Río de Ocampo and bridge.
1351-006: Section of the Camino Real between the bridge of La Colmena and the Hacienda de La Cañada.

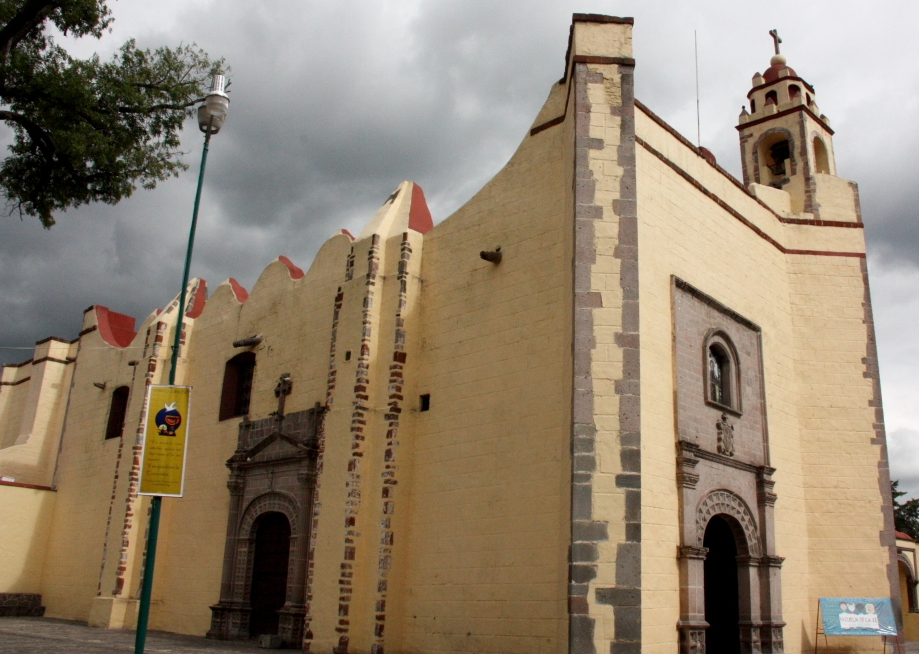
Templo and exconvento de San Francisco in Tepeji del Río de Ocampo.

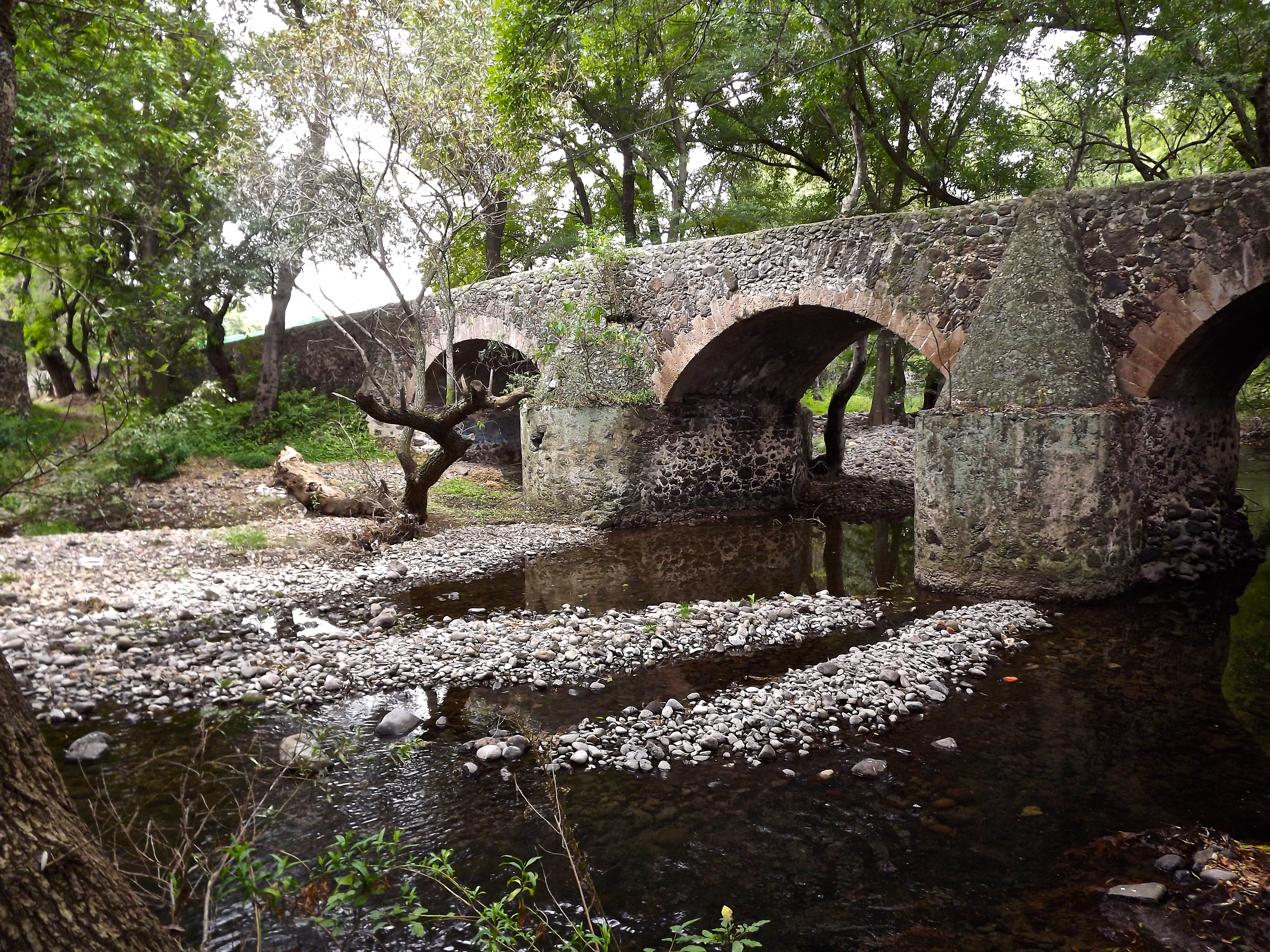
Bridge of Tlautla.

==== State of Querétaro ====
1351-007: Historic center of San Juan del Río.
1351-008: Hacienda de Chichimequillas.
1351-009: Chapel of the hacienda de Buenavista.
1351-010: Historic center of Santiago de Querétaro.

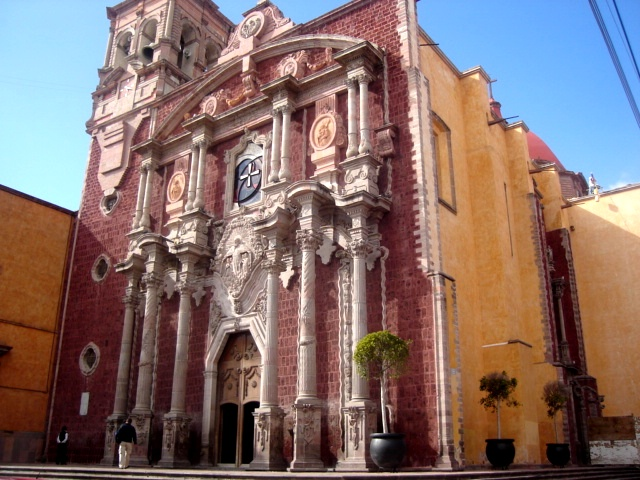
Querétaro Cathedral

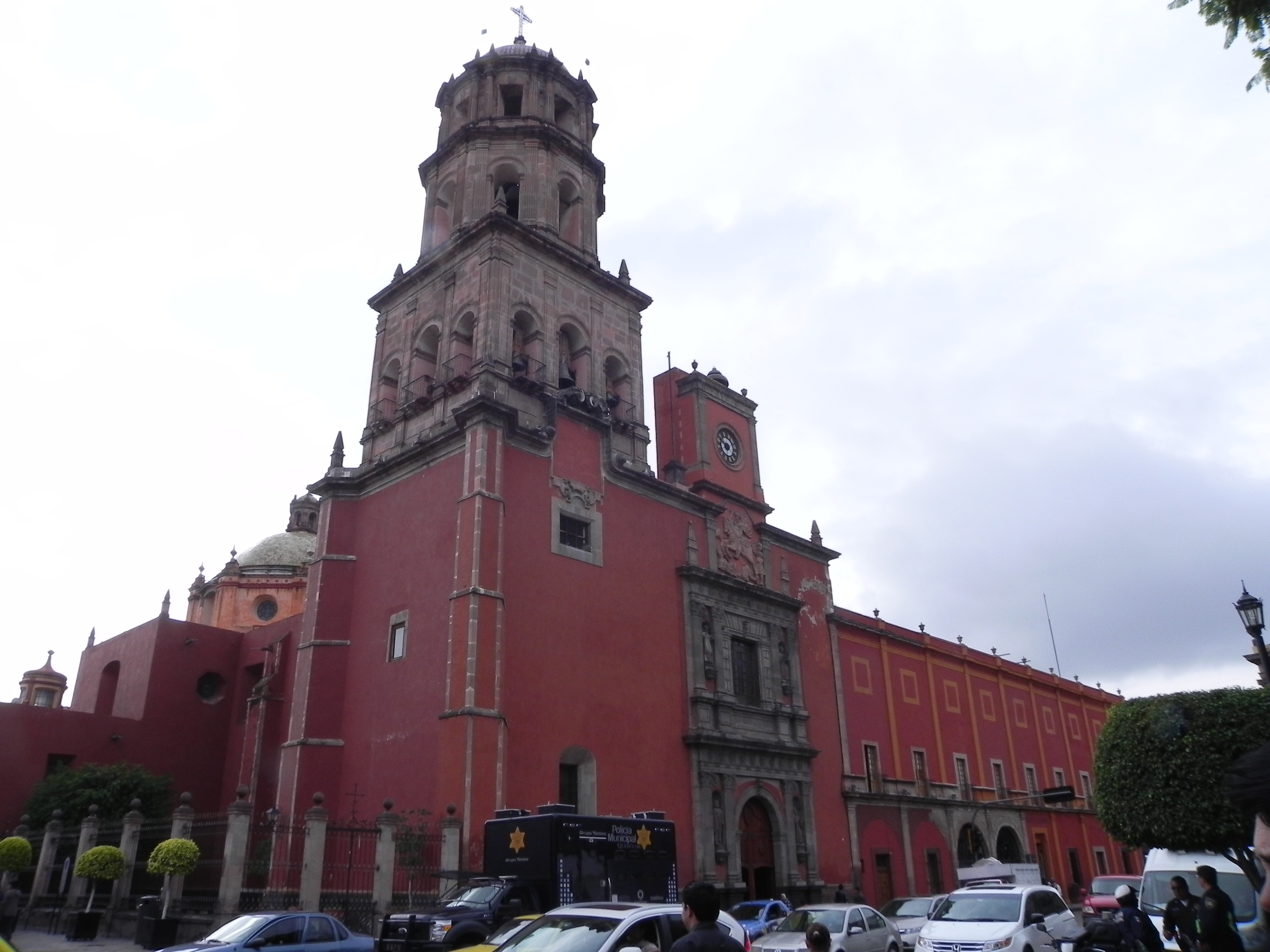
Templo y exconvento de San Francisco de Asís.

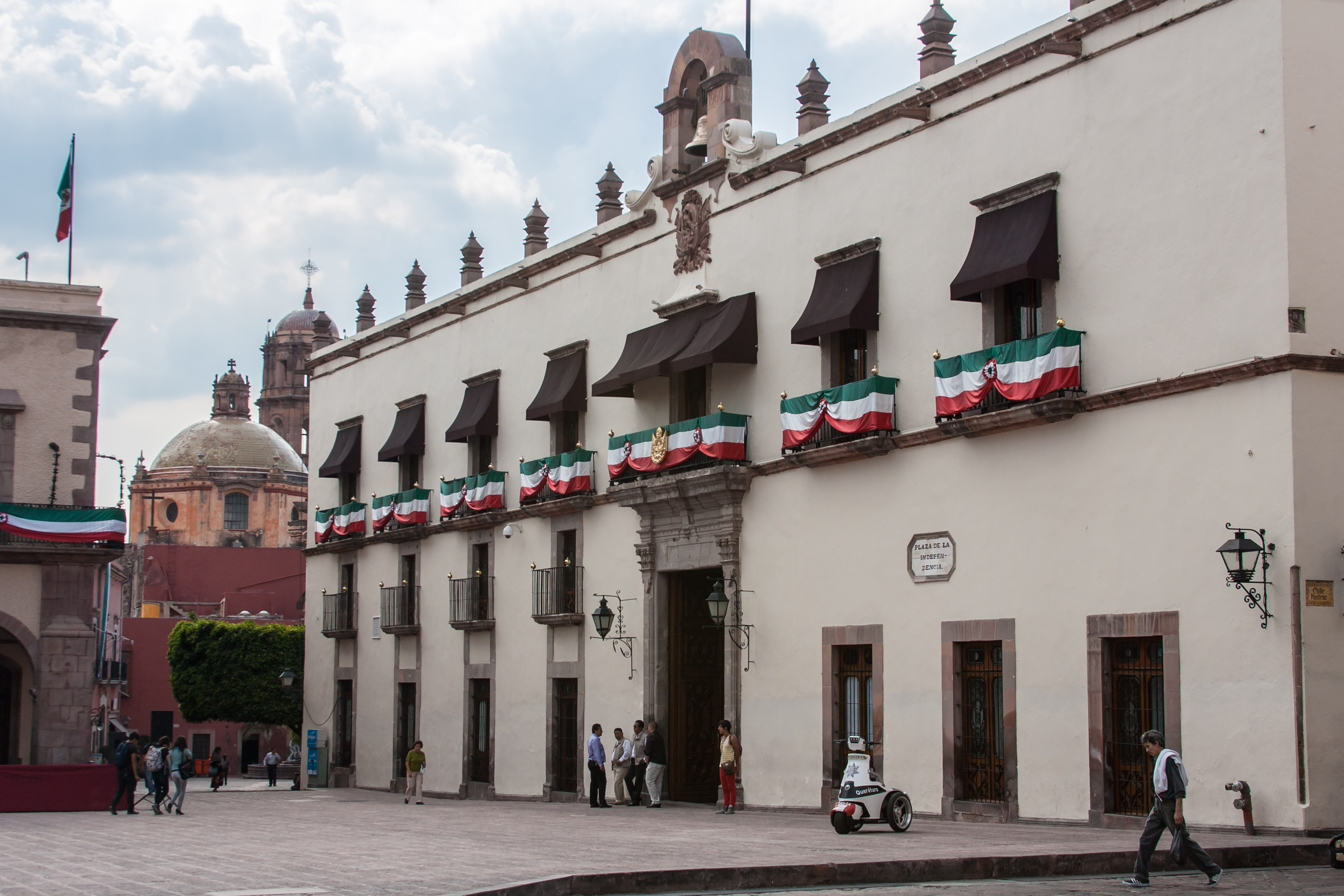
House of la Corregidora.

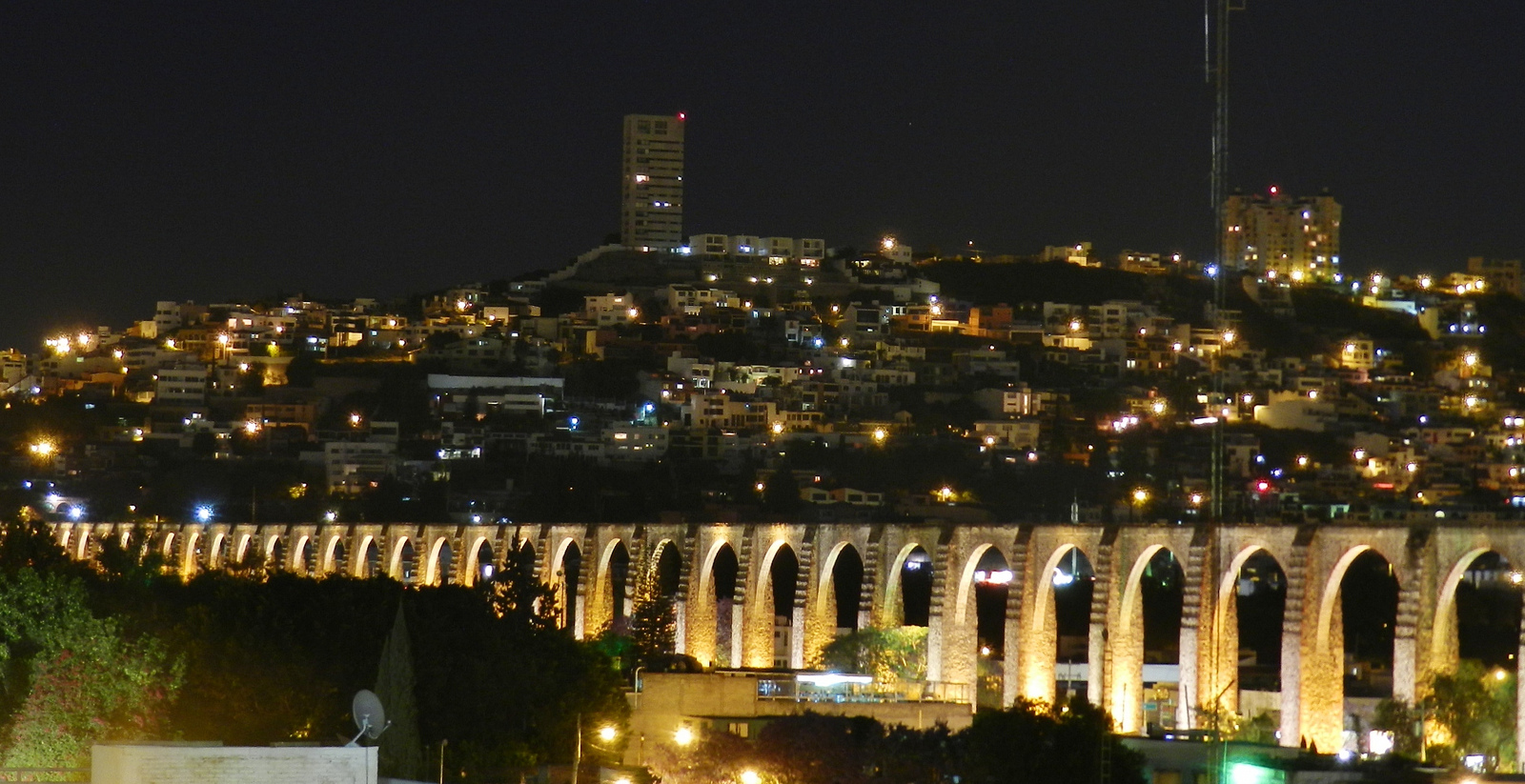
Querétaro Aqueduct

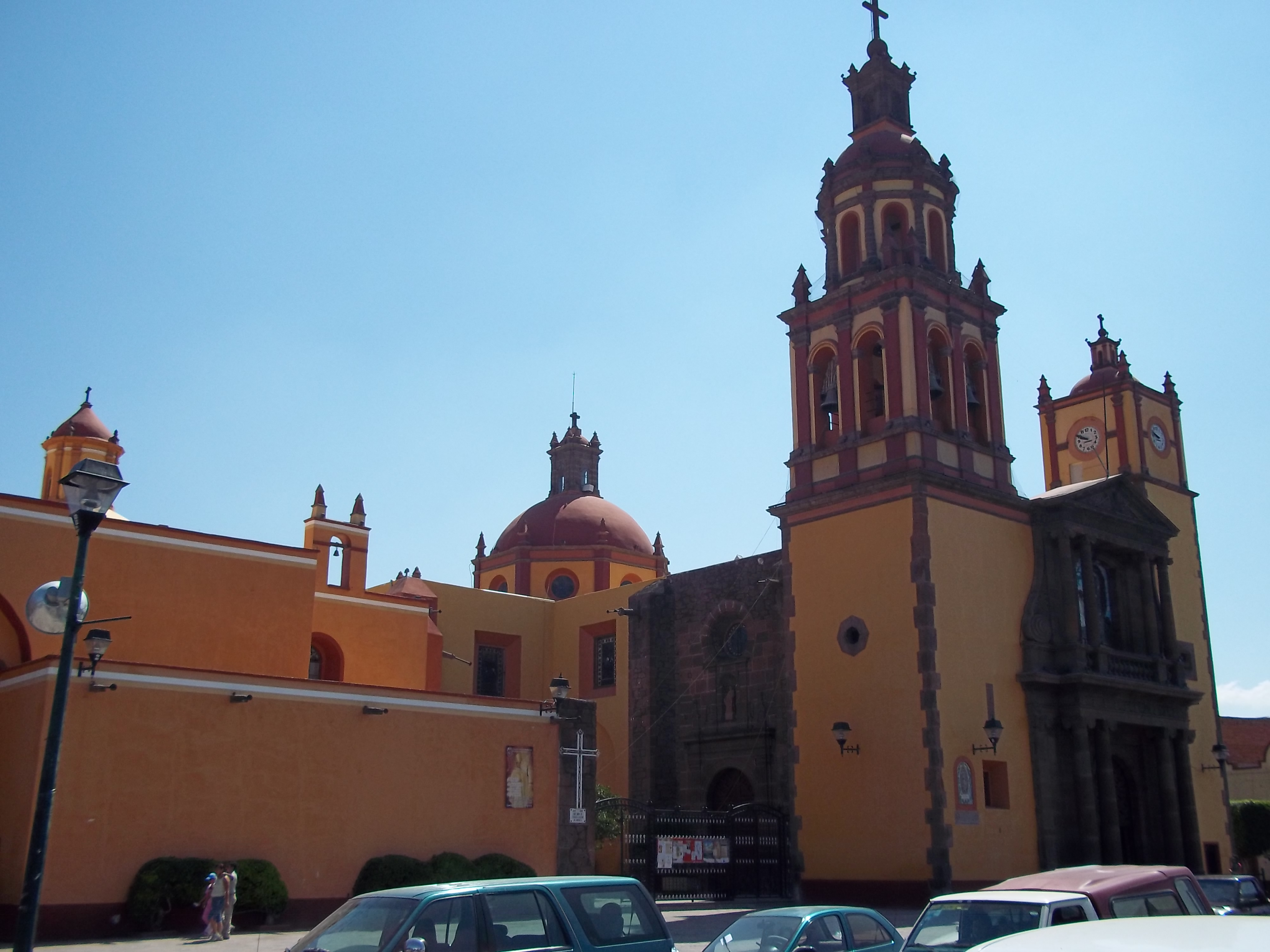
Capilla de Nuestra Señora de Guadalupe in San Juan del Río

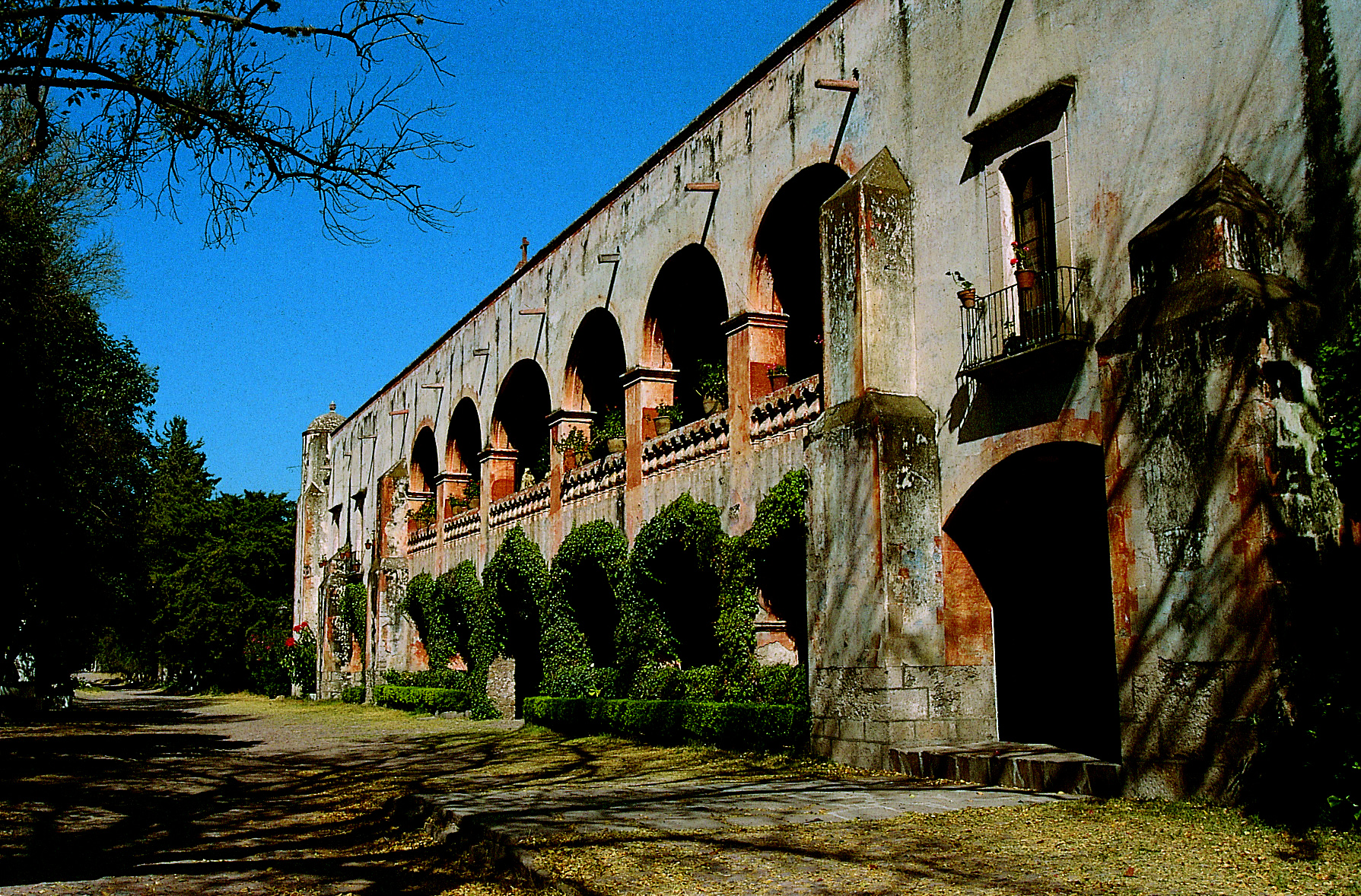
Hacienda de Chichimequillas, El Marqués municipality.

==== State of Guanajuato ====
1351-011: Bridge of El Fraile.
1351-012: Antiguo Real Hospital de San Juan de Dios in San Miguel de Allende.
1351-013: Bridge of San Rafael in Guanajuato.
1351-014: Bridge La Quemada.
1351-015: Sanctuario de Jesús Nazareno de Atotonilco in the Municipality of San Miguel de Allende.
1351-016: Historic center of Guanajuato and its adjacent mines.

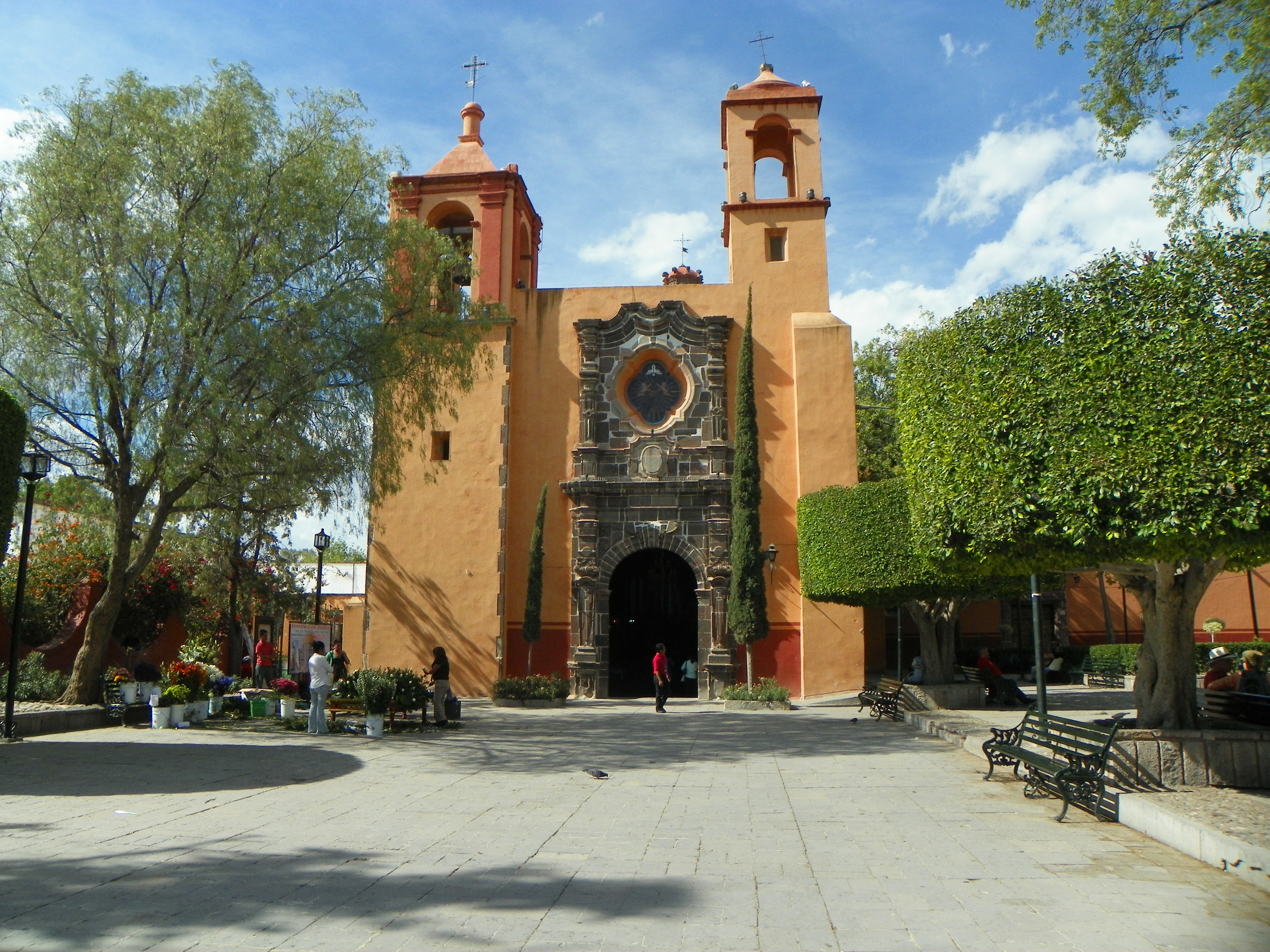
Antiguo Real Hospital de San Juan de Dios

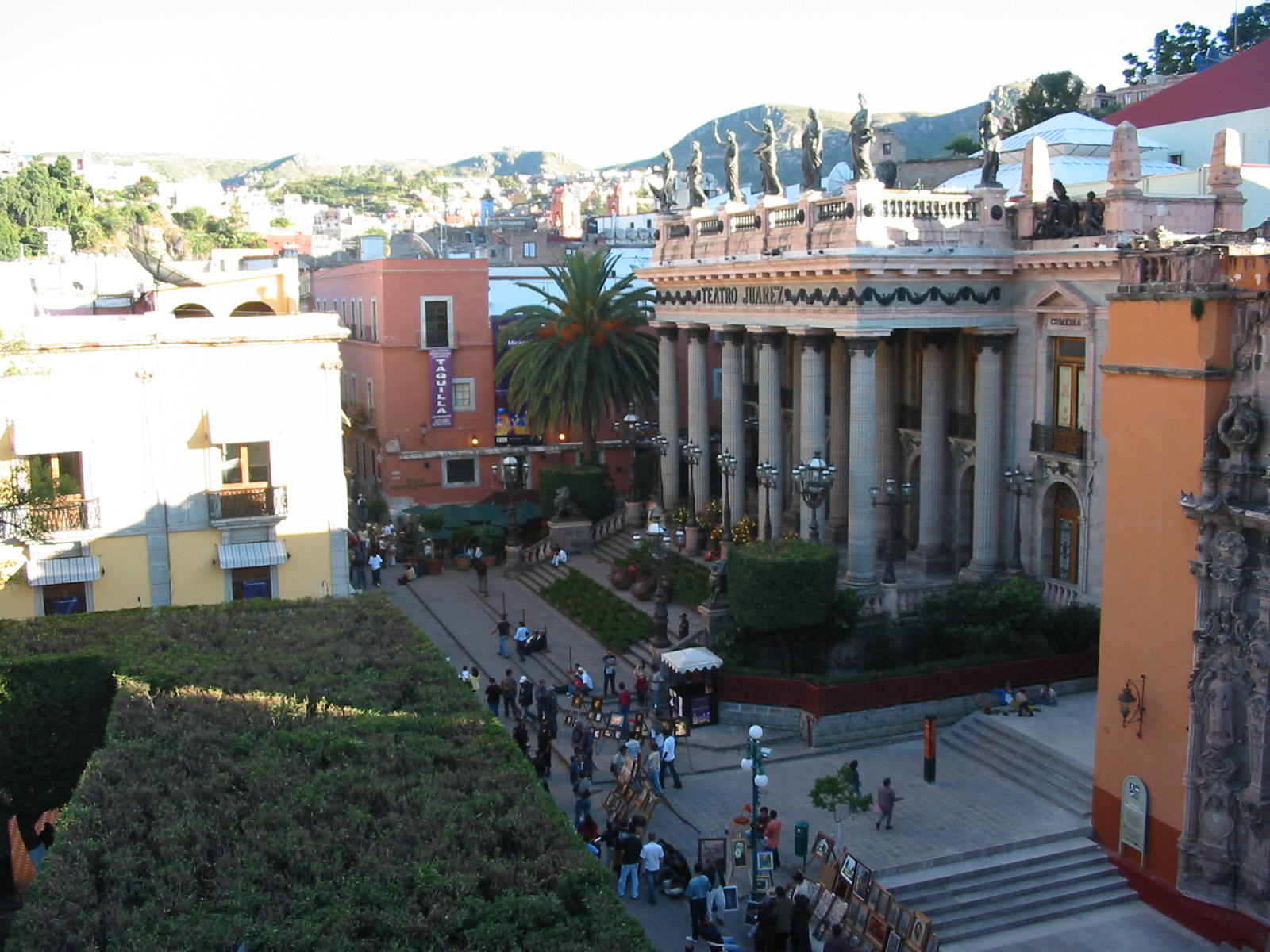
Guanajuato city

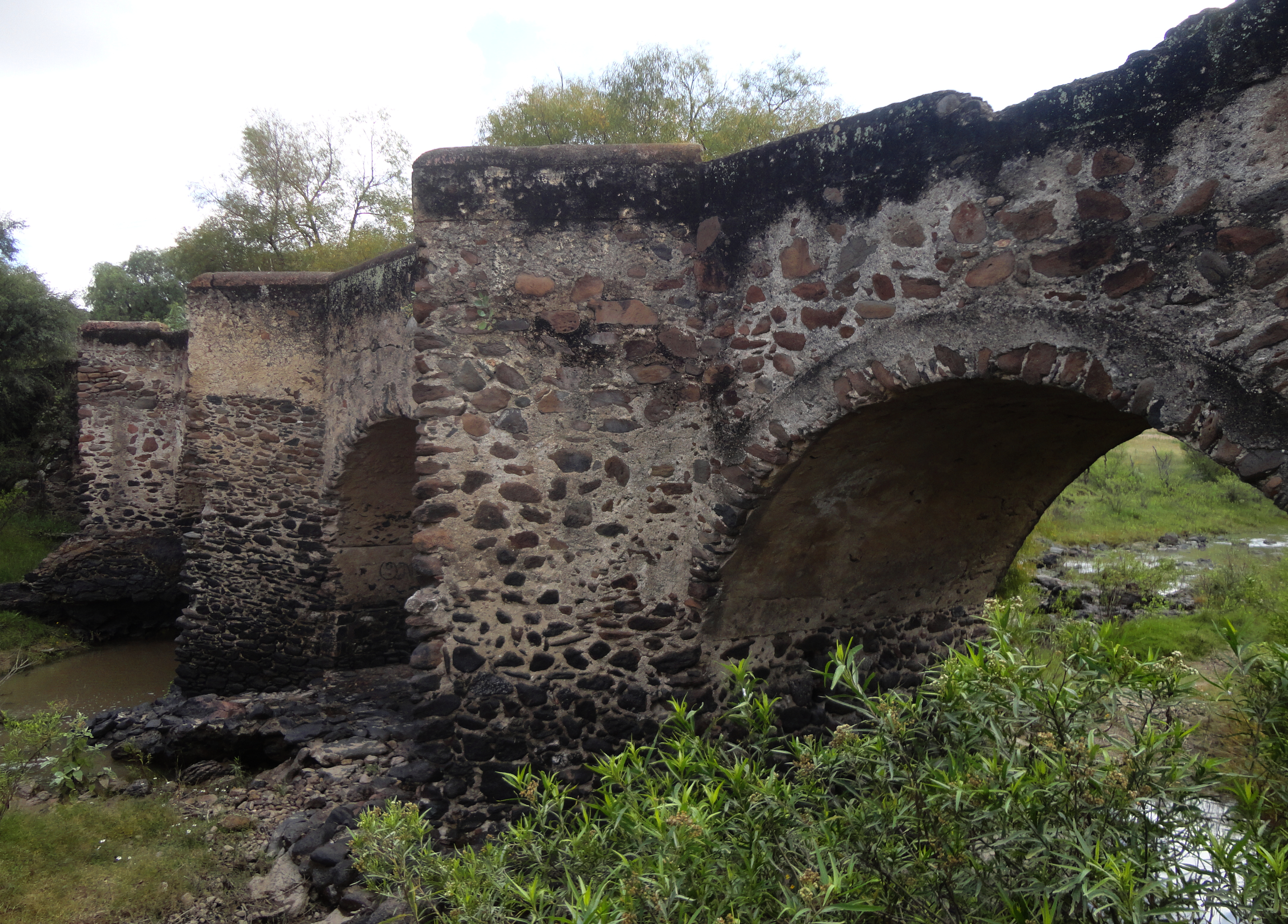
Bridge La Quemada

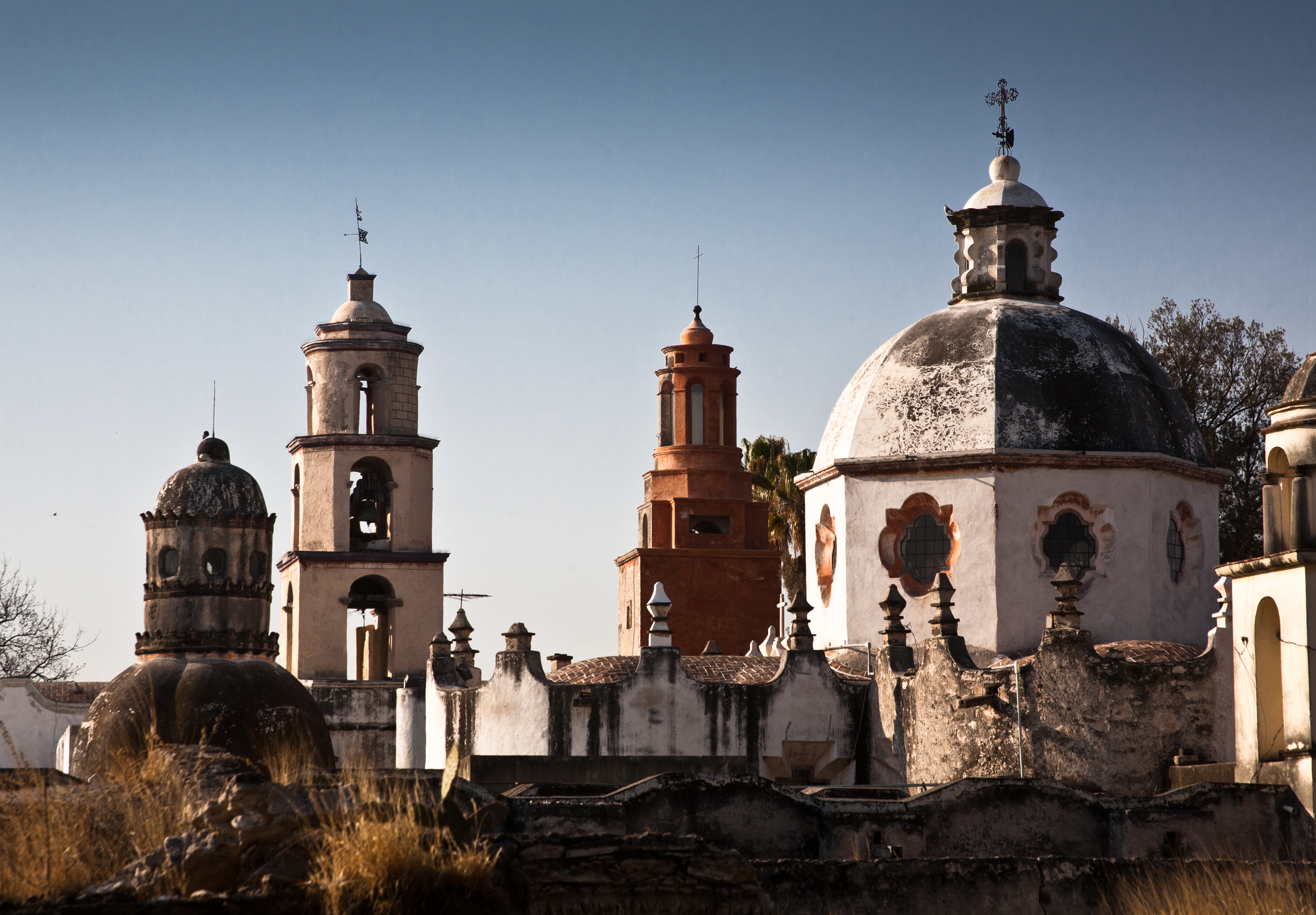
Sanctuario de Jesús Nazareno de Atotonilco

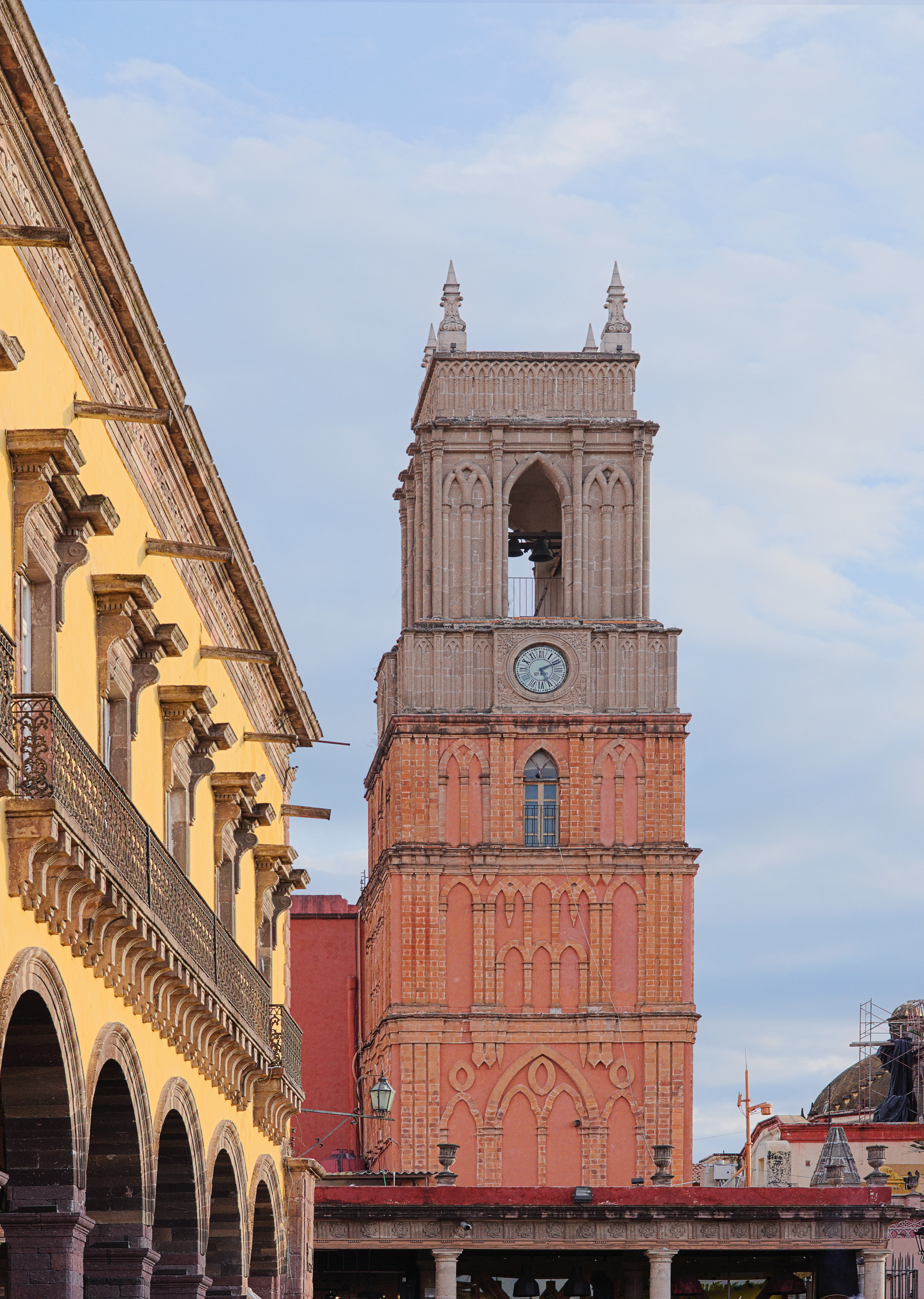
San Miguel de Allende

==== State of Jalisco ====
1351-017: Historic center of Lagos de Moreno and bridge.
1351-018: Historic center of Ojuelos de Jalisco.
1351-019: Bridge of Ojuelos de Jalisco.
1351-020: Hacienda de Ciénega de Mata.
1351-021: Old Cemetery of Encarnación de Díaz.

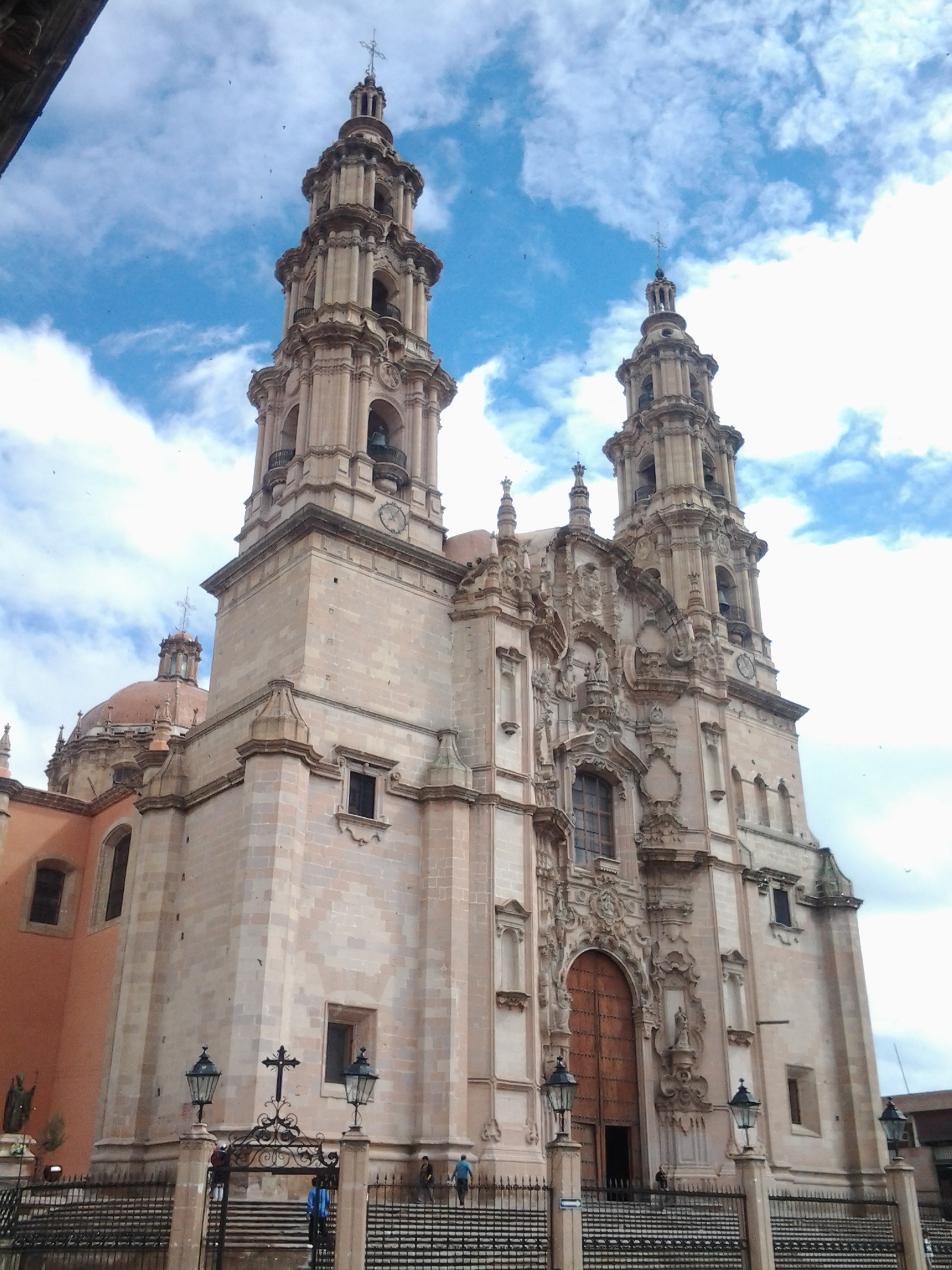
Parroquia de la Asunción de María in Lagos de Moreno

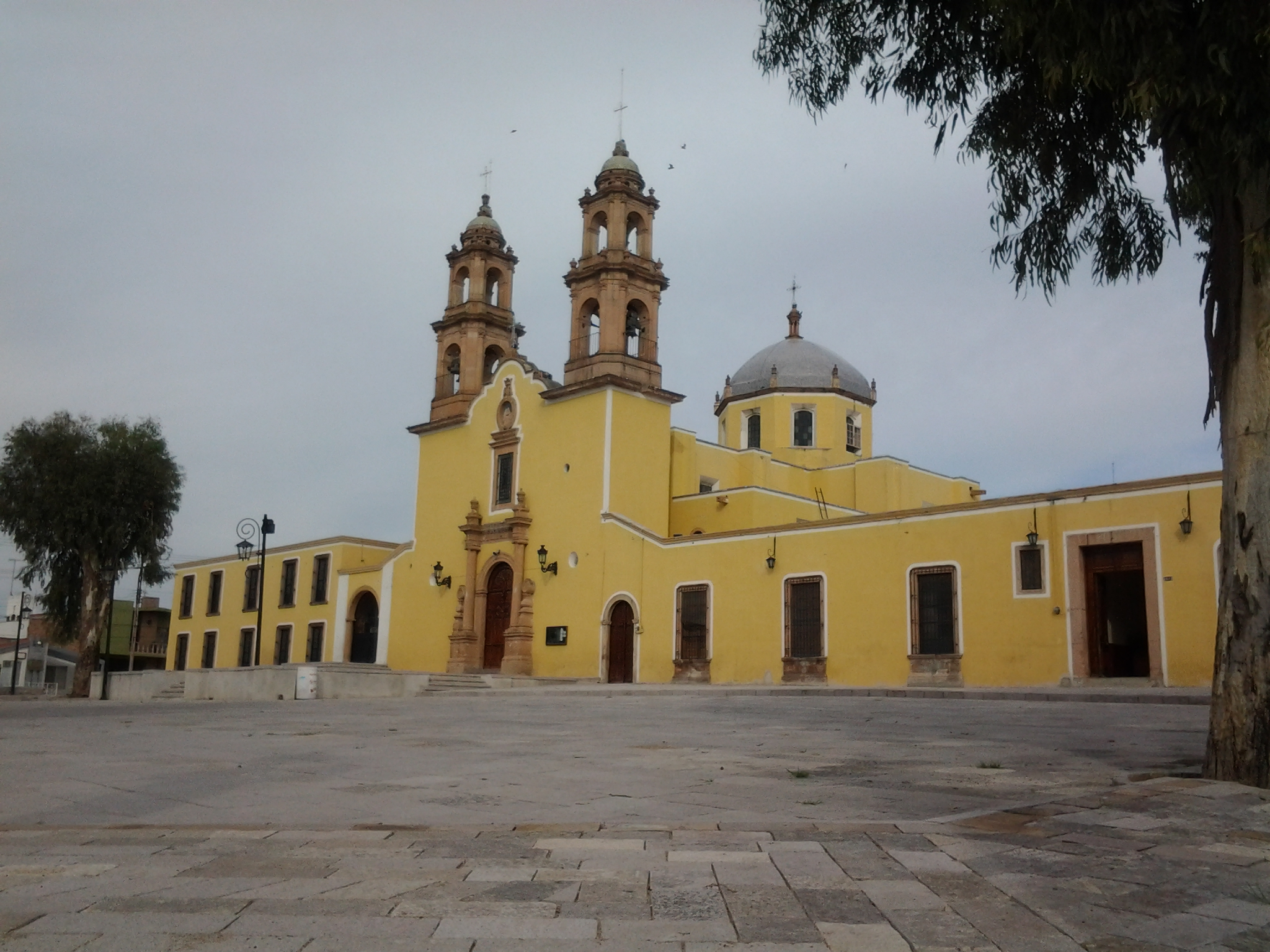
Parroquia de Nuestra Señora del Refugio in Lagos de Moreno

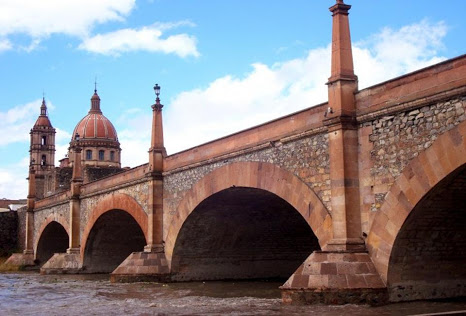
Bridge of Lagos de Moreno

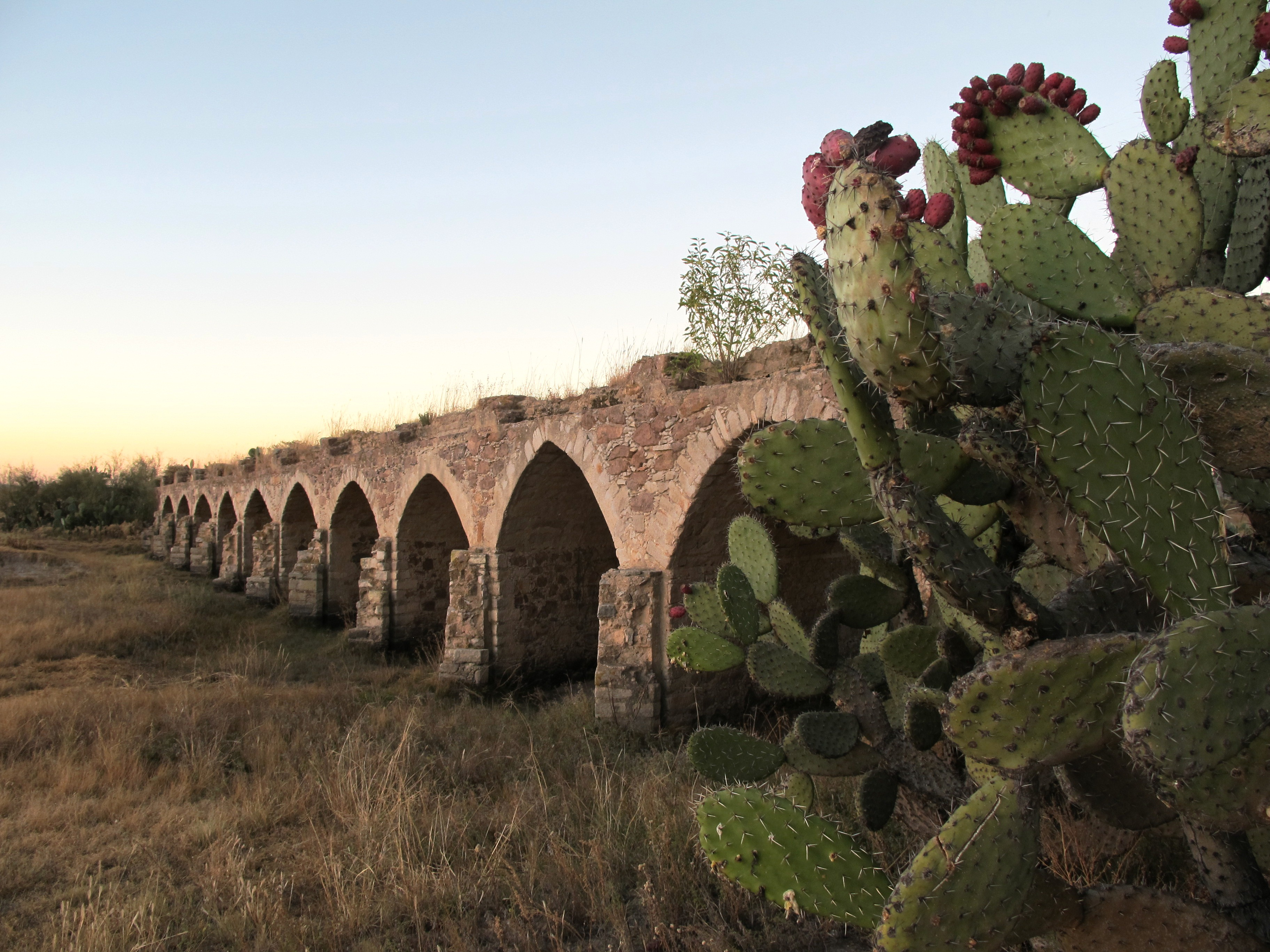
Bridge of Ojuelos de Jalisco

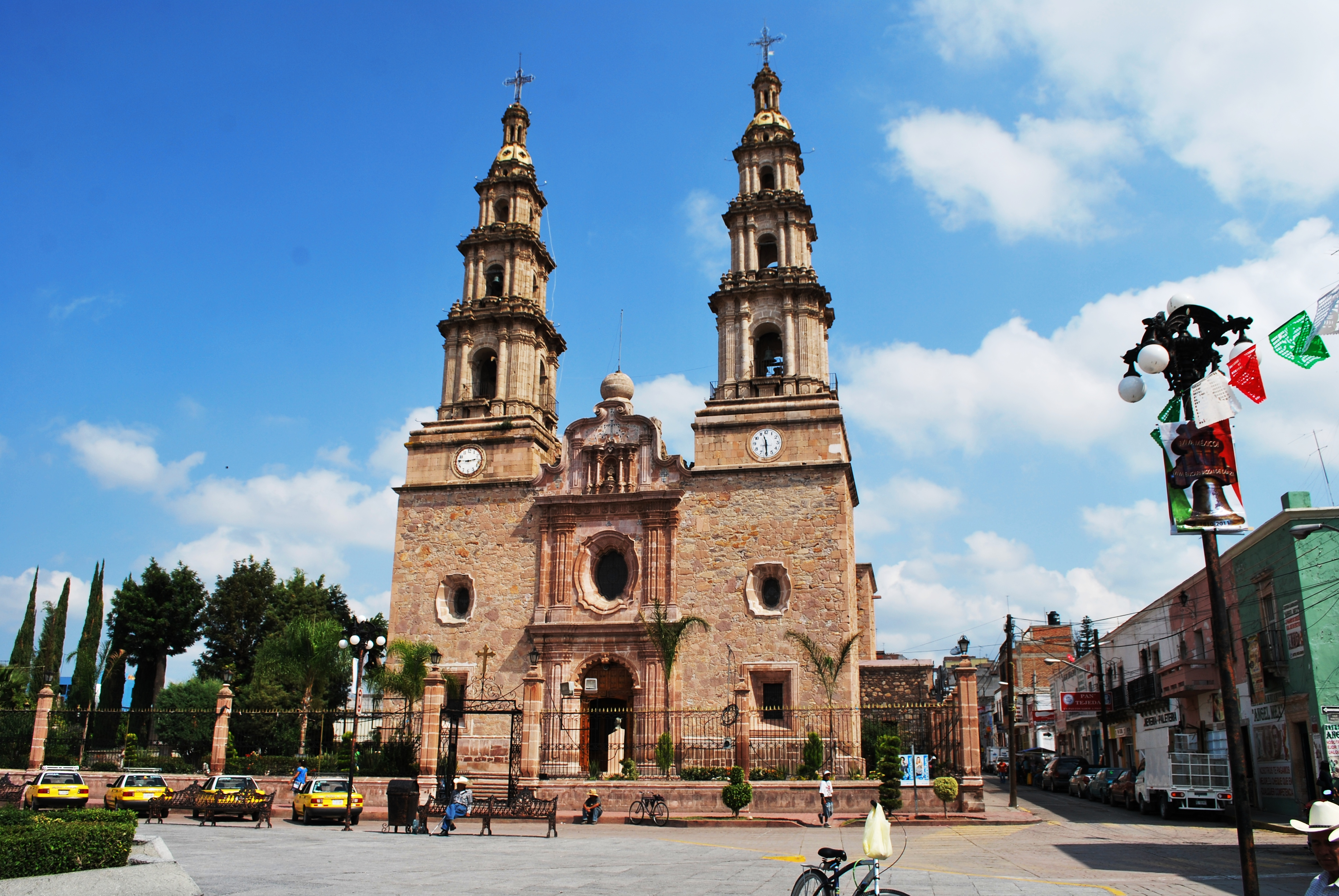
Church in Encarnación de Díaz

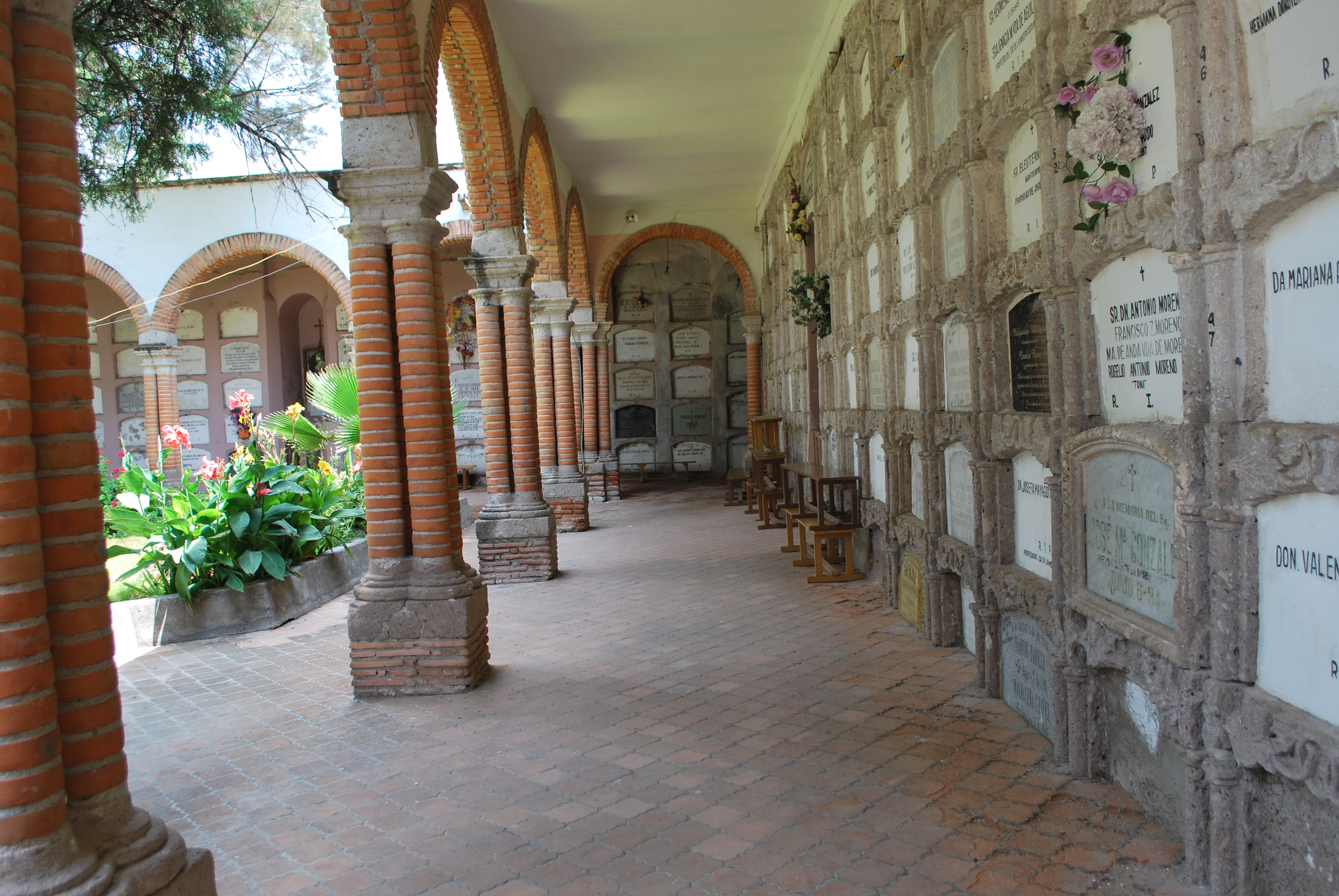
Old Cemetery in Encarnación de Díaz

==== State of Aguascalientes ====
1351-022: Hacienda de Peñuelas.
1351-023: Hacienda de Cieneguilla.
1351-024: Historic center of Aguascalientes.
1351-025: Hacienda de Pabellón de Hidalgo.

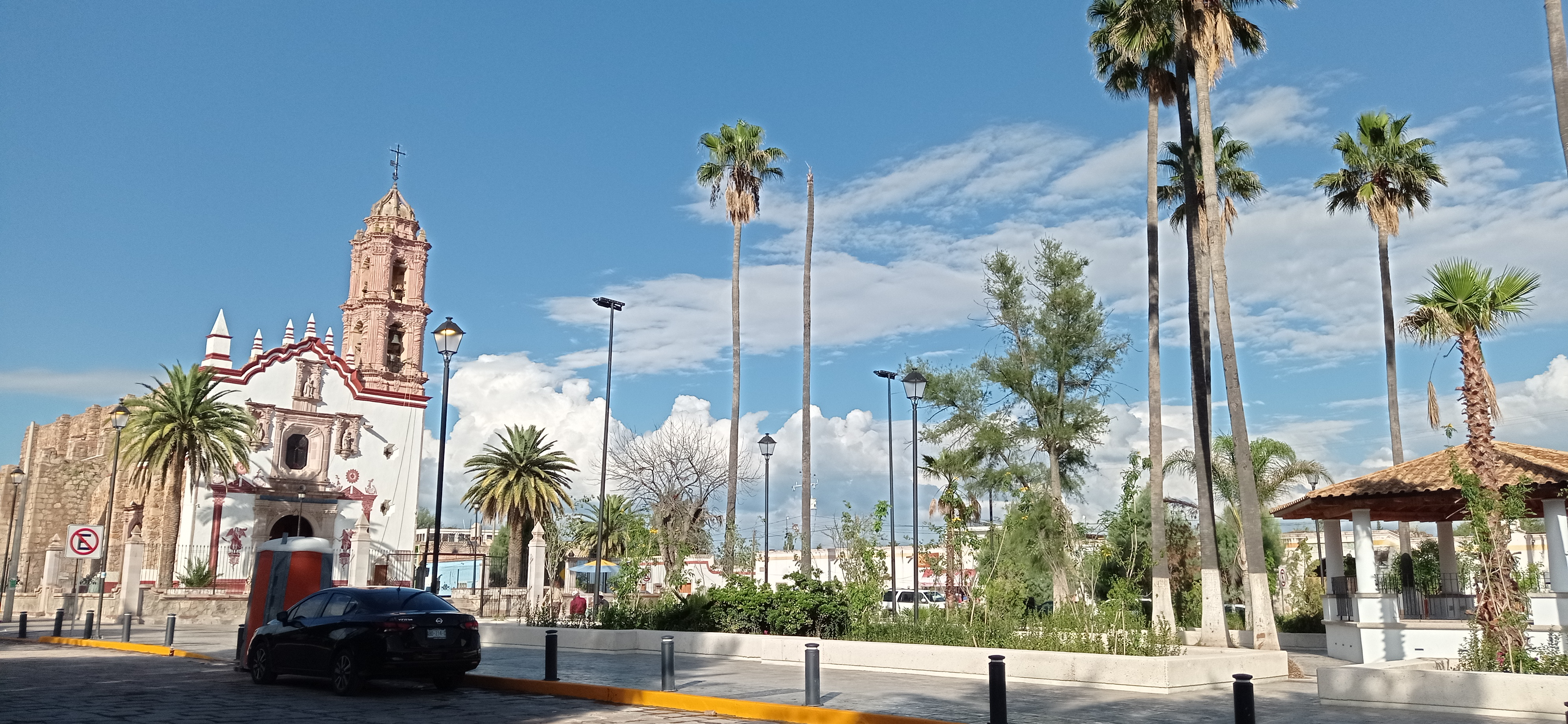
Church of San Blas in Pabellón de Hidalgo

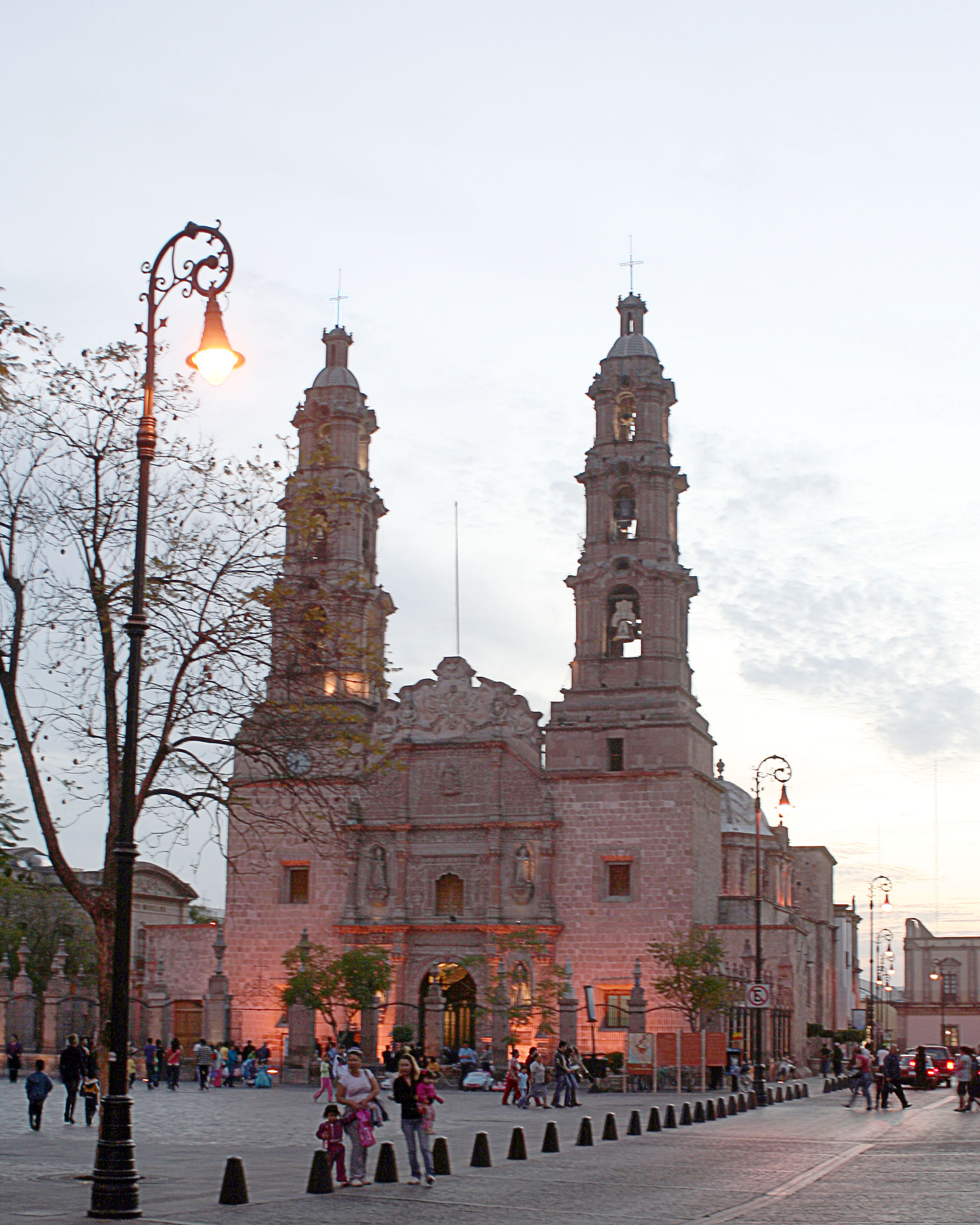
Aguascalientes cathedral.

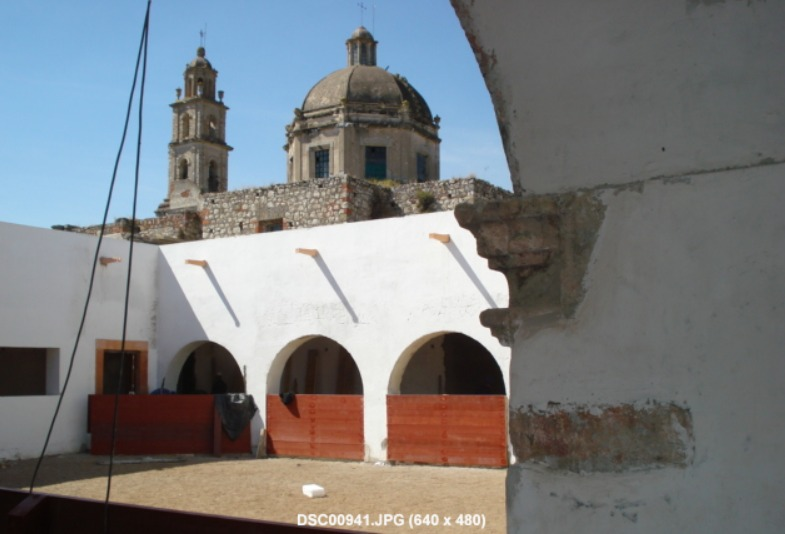
Hacienda de Peñuelas

==== State of Zacatecas ====
1351-026: Chapel of San Nicolás Tolentino of the Hacienda de San Nicolás de Quijas.
1351-027: Town of Pinos.
1351-028: Templo de Nuestra Señora de los Ángeles of the town of Noria de Ángeles.
1351-029: Templo de Nuestra Señora de los Dolores in Villa González Ortega.
1351-030: Colegio de Nuestra Señora de Guadalupe de Propaganda Fide.
1351-031: Historic center of Sombrerete.
1351-032: Templo de San Pantaleón Mártir in the town of Noria de San Pantaleón.
1351-033: Sierra de Órganos.
1351-034: Architectural set of the town of Chalchihuites.
1351-035: Section of the Camino Real between Ojocaliente and Zacatecas.
1351-036: Cave of Ávalos.
1351-037: Historic center of Zacatecas.
1351-038: Sanctuary of Plateros.

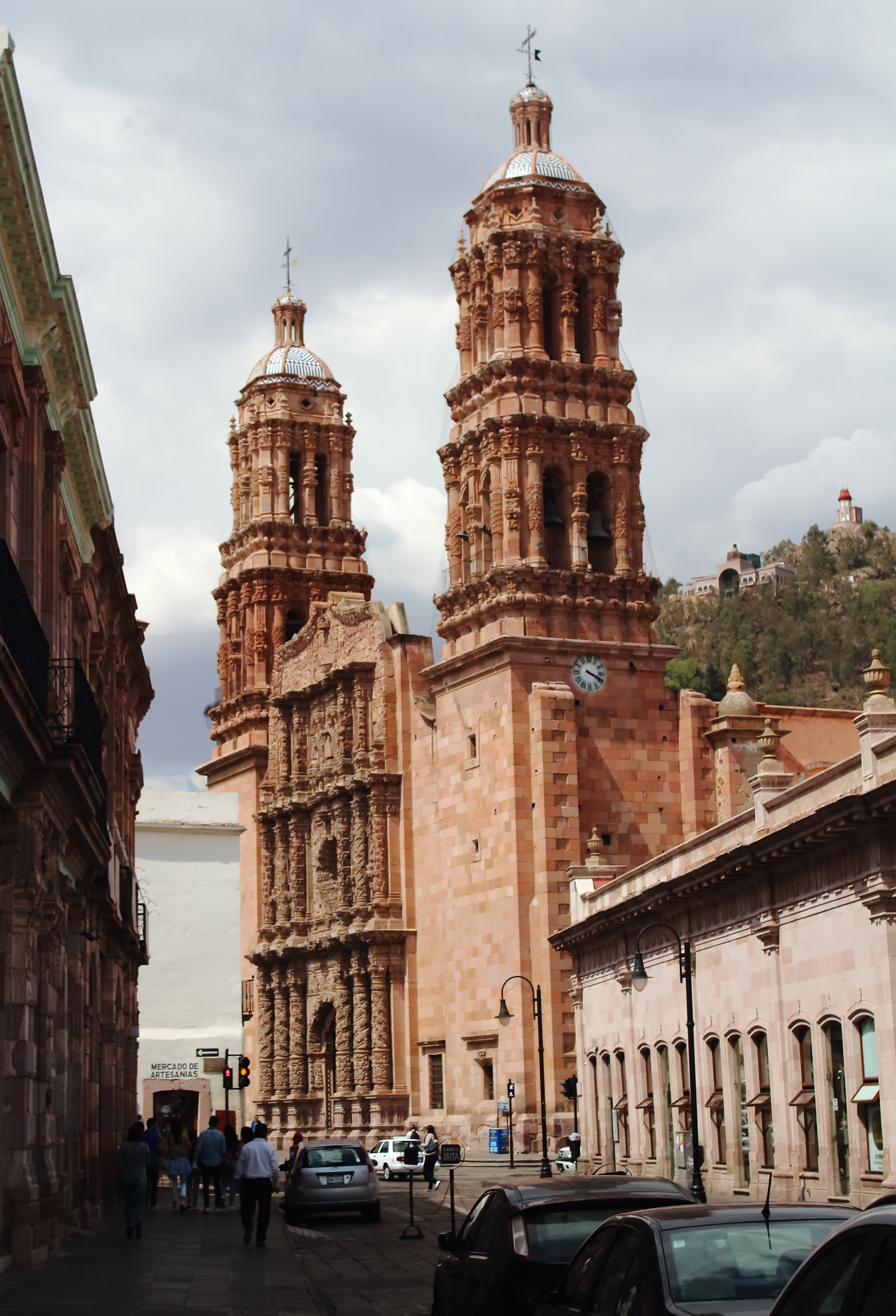
Zacatecas Cathedral

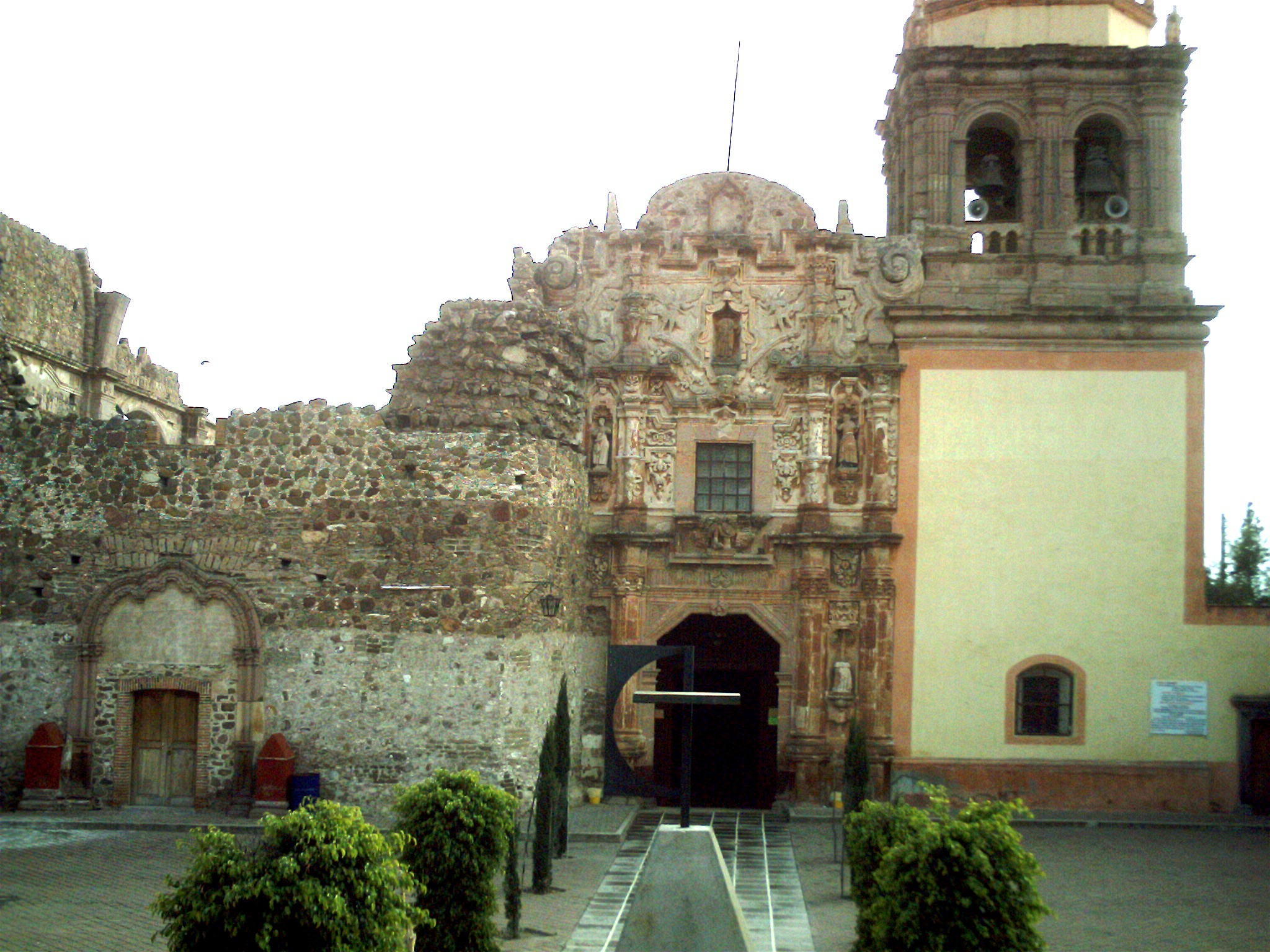
Main church of the town of Pinos

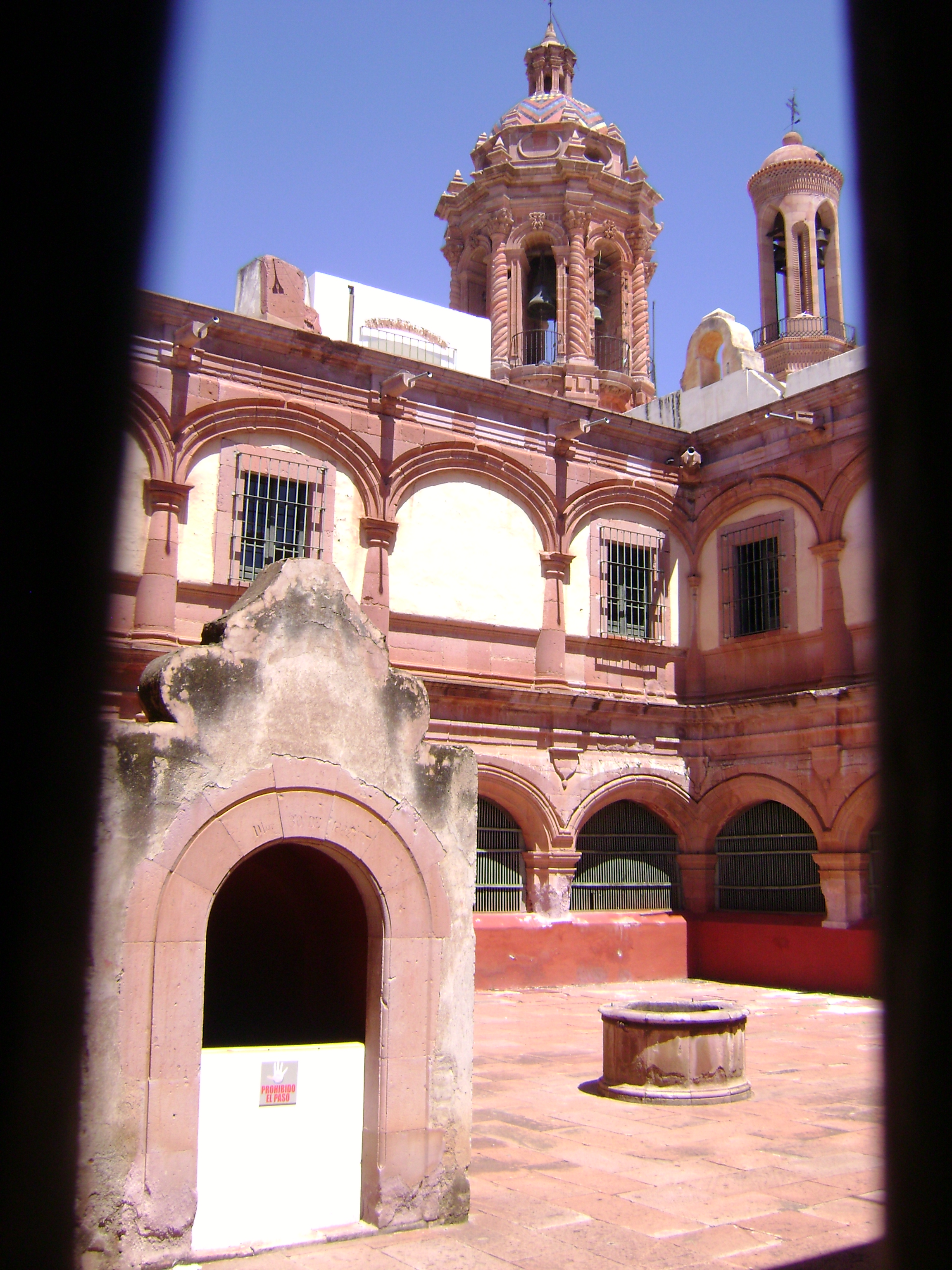
Colegio de Nuestra Señora de Guadalupe de Propaganda Fide

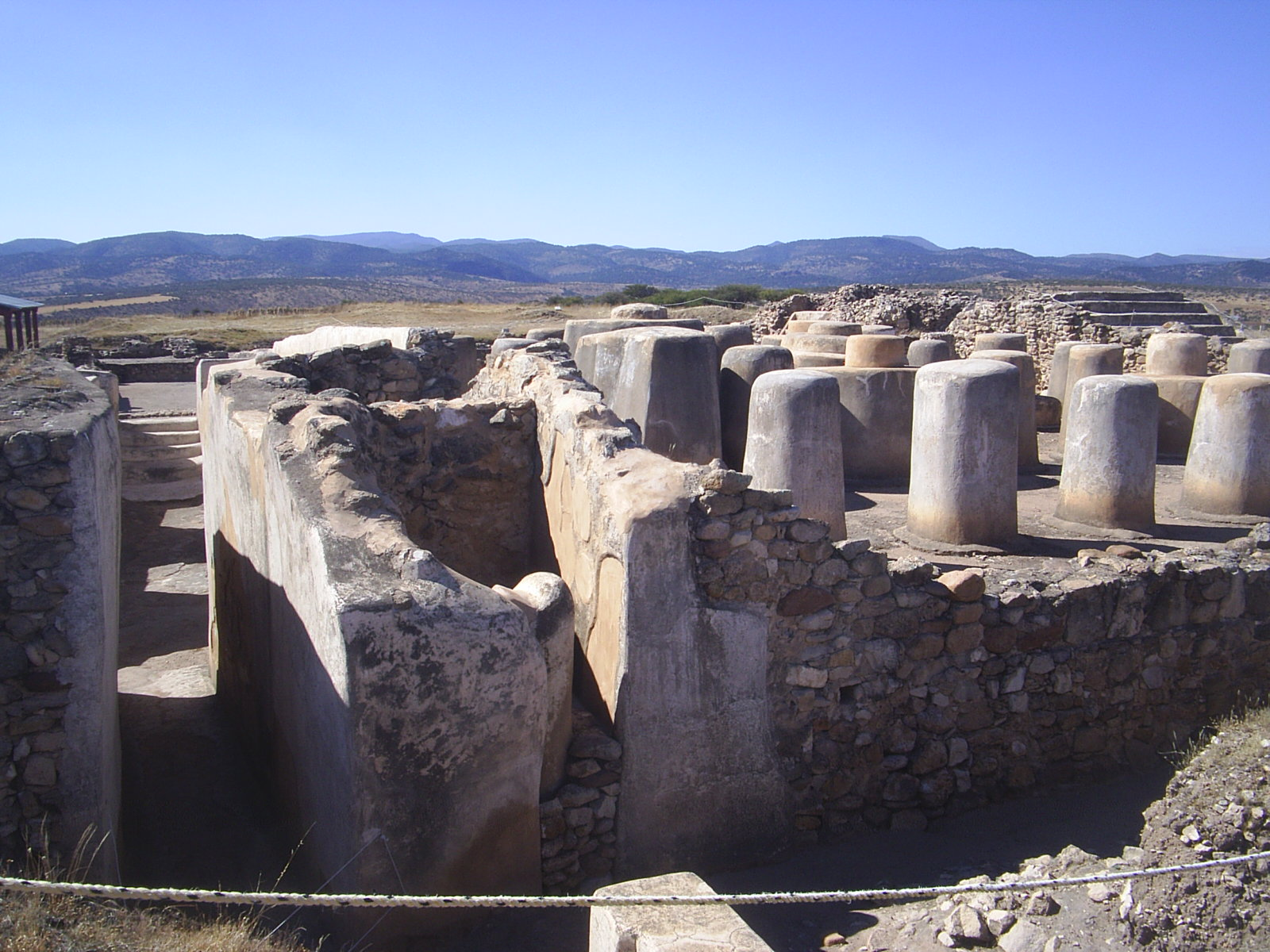
El Laberinto of Altavista archaeological zone in Chalchihuites

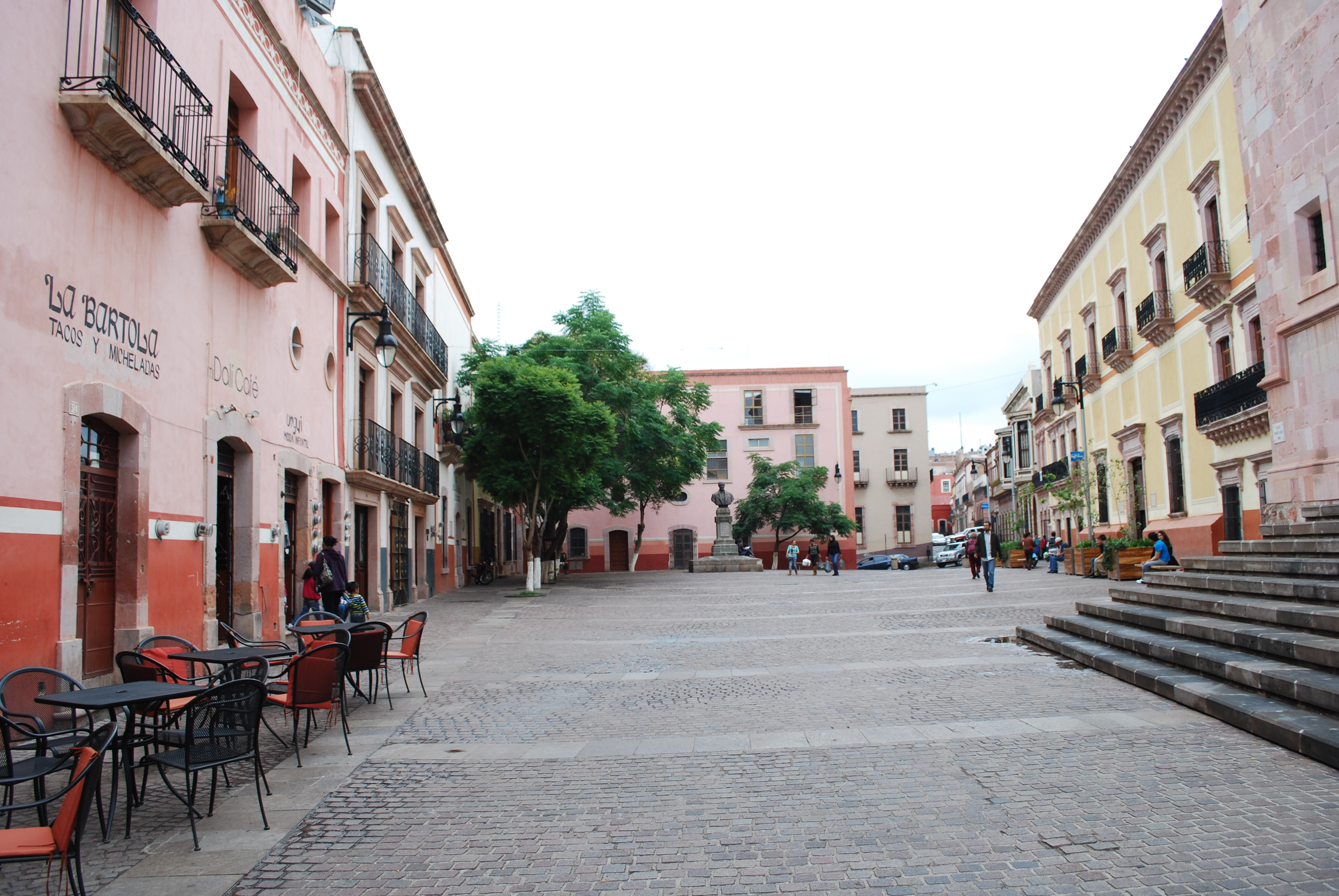
Plaza de San Agustin in Zacatecas

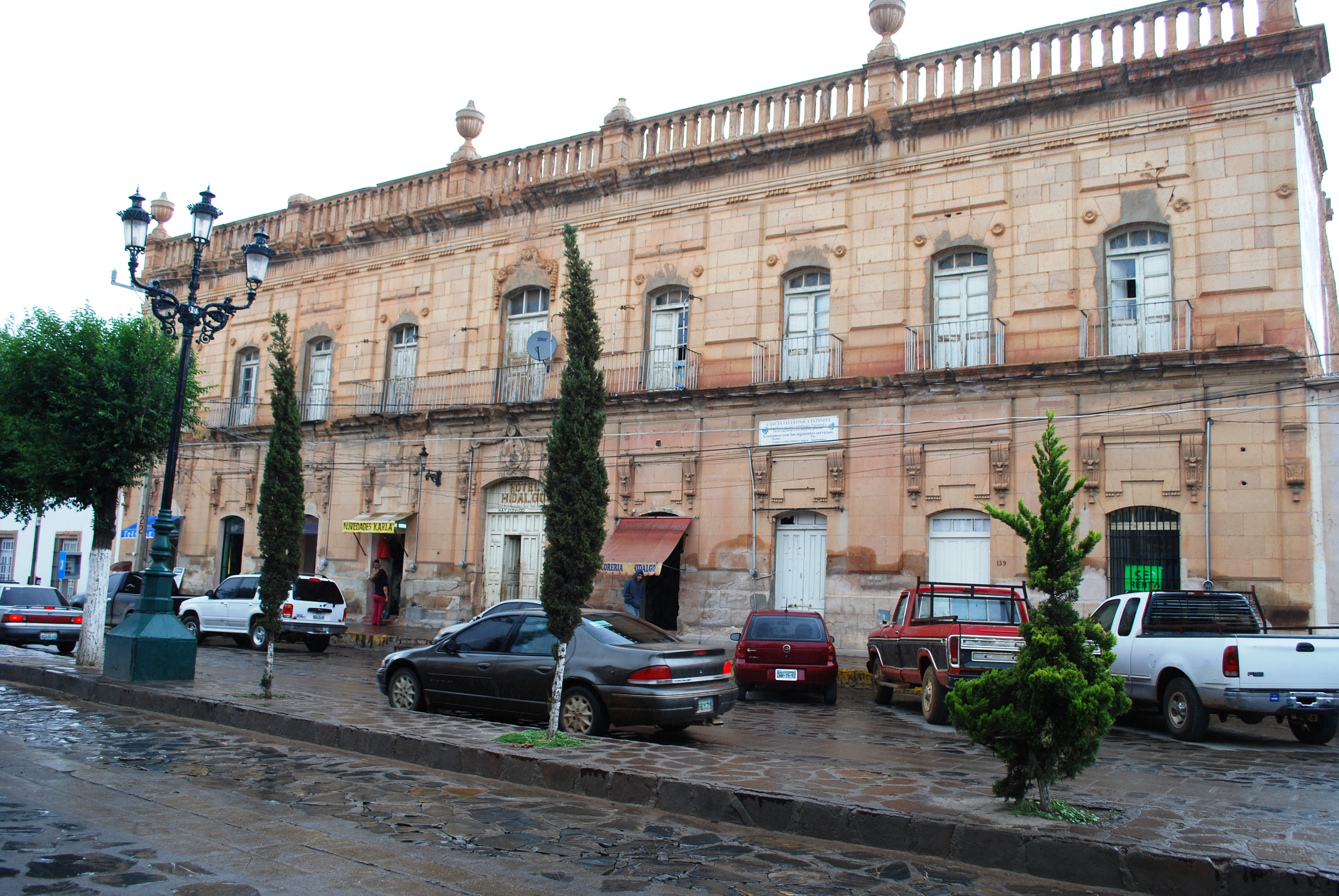
Cajas Reales in Sombrerete

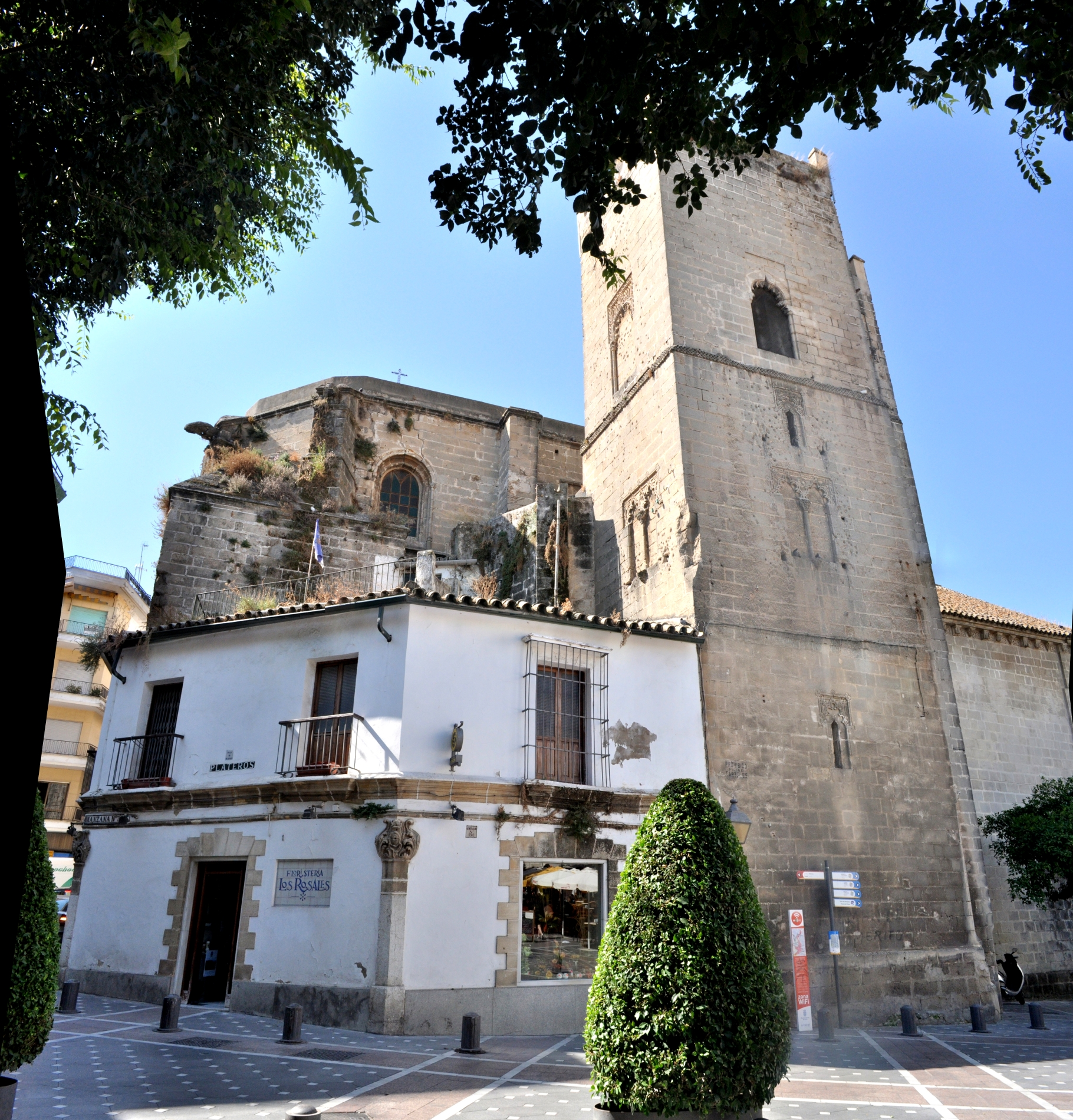
Plaza of Plateros, Fresnillo.

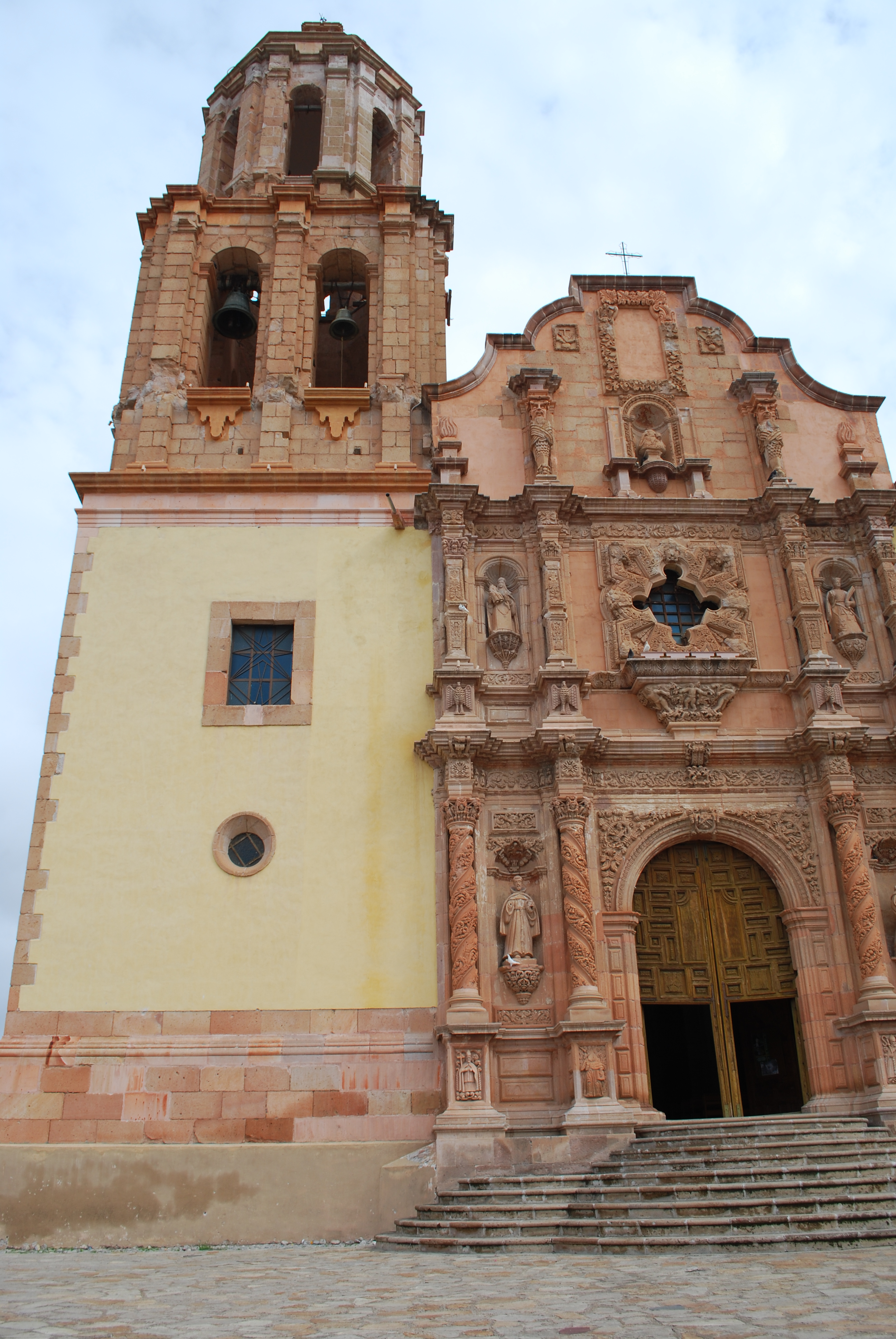
Iglesia de Santo Domingo in Sombrerete

==== State of San Luis Potosí ====
1351-039: Historic center of San Luis Potosí.

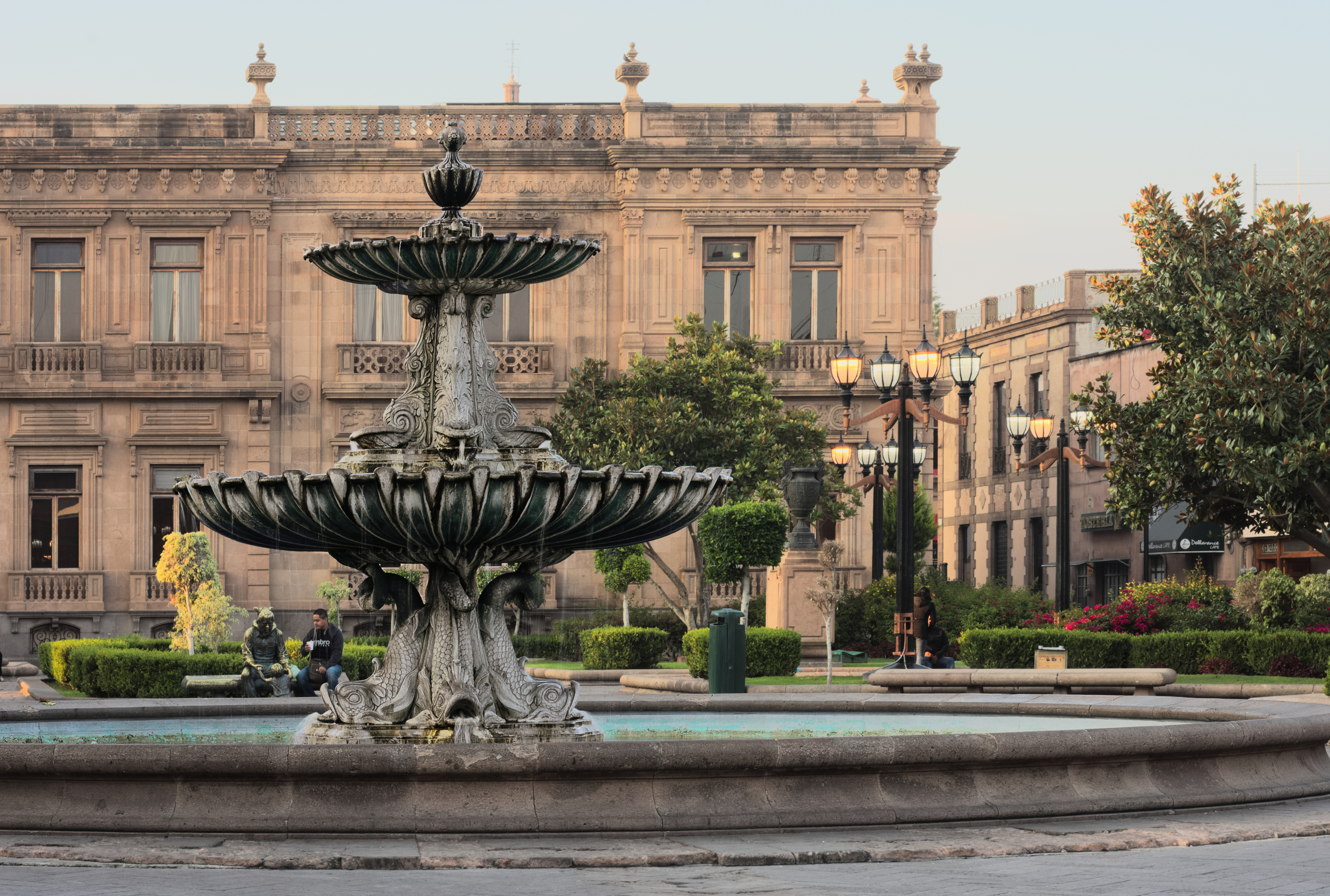
Plaza del Carmen, historic center of San Luis Potosí.

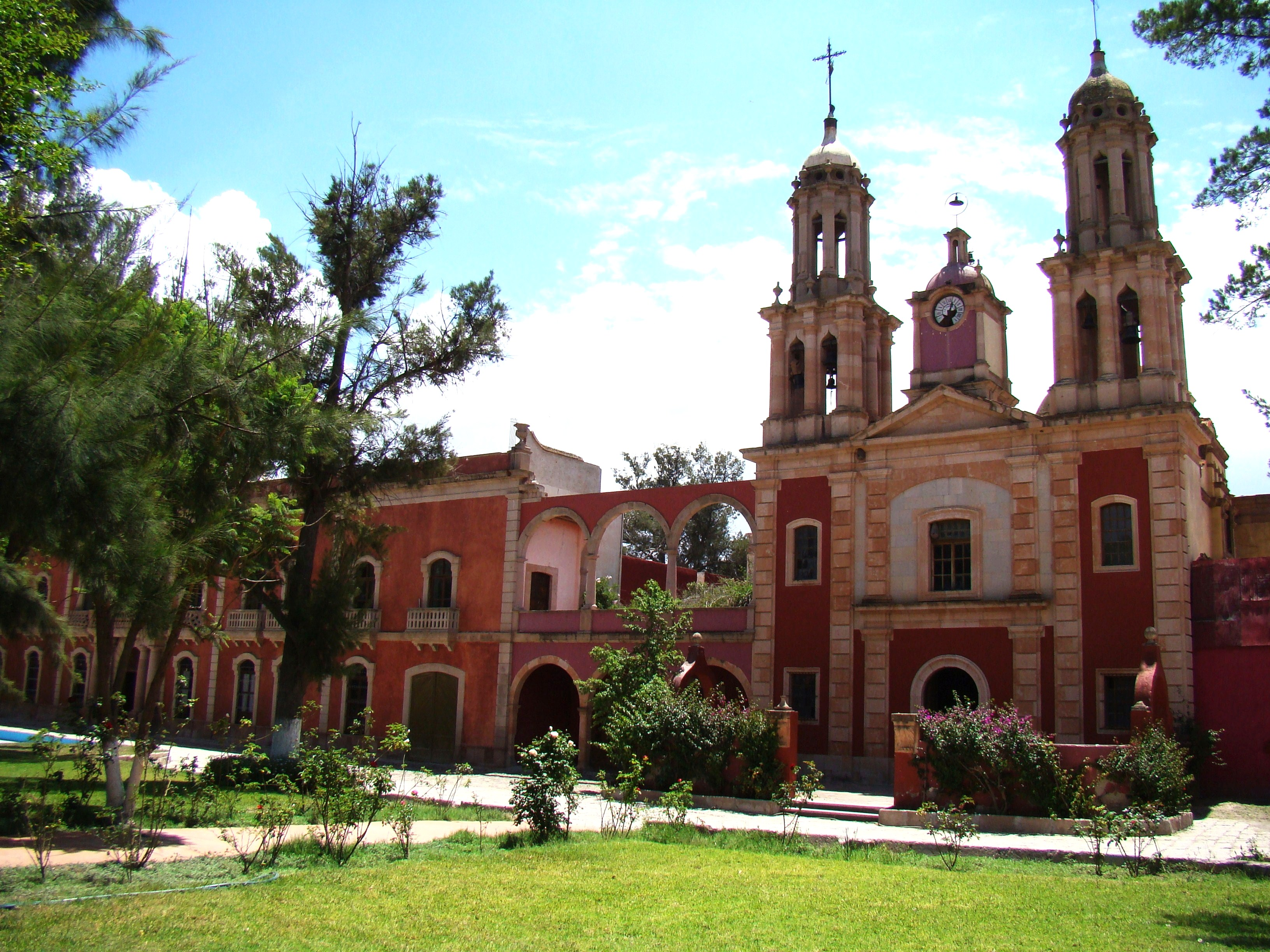
Chapel of San Pedro in Hacienda de Gongorron

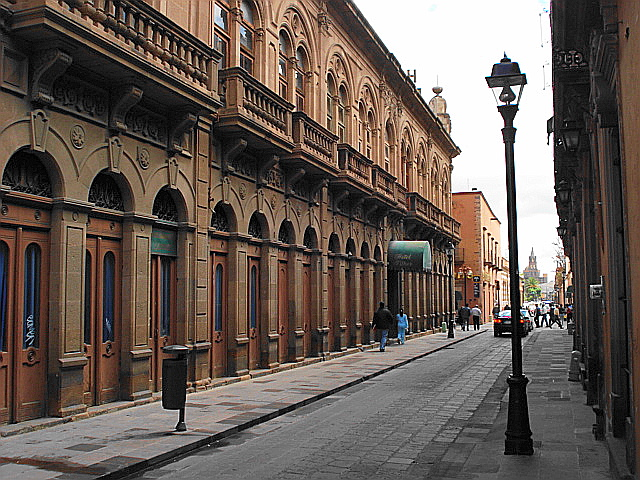
Calle Universidad street

==== State of Durango ====
1351-040: Chapel of San Antonio of the Hacienda de Juana Guerra.
1351-041: Churches in the town of Nombre de Dios.
1351-042: Hacienda de San Diego de Navacoyán and Bridge del Diablo.
1351-043: Historic center of Durango.
1351-044: Churches in the town of Cuencamé and Cristo de Mapimí.
1351-045: Templo de Nuestra Señora del Refugio in the Hacienda La Pedriceña in Los Cuatillos, Cuencamé Municipality.
1351-046: Iglesia Principal of the town of San José de Avino.
1351-047: Chapel of the Hacienda de la Inmaculada Concepción of Palmitos de Arriba.
1351-048: Chapel of the Hacienda de la Limpia Concepción of Palmitos de Abajo.
1351-049: Architectural set of Nazas.
1351-050: Town of San Pedro del Gallo.
1351-051: Architectural set of the town of Mapimí.
1351-052: Town of Indé.
1351-053: Chapel of San Mateo of the Hacienda de San Mateo de la Zarca.
1351-054: Hacienda de la Limpia Concepción of Canutillo.
1351-055: Templo de San Miguel in the town of Villa Ocampo.
1351-056: Section of the Camino Real between Nazas and San Pedro del Gallo.
1351-057: Ojuela Mine.
1351-058: Cave of Las Mulas de Molino.

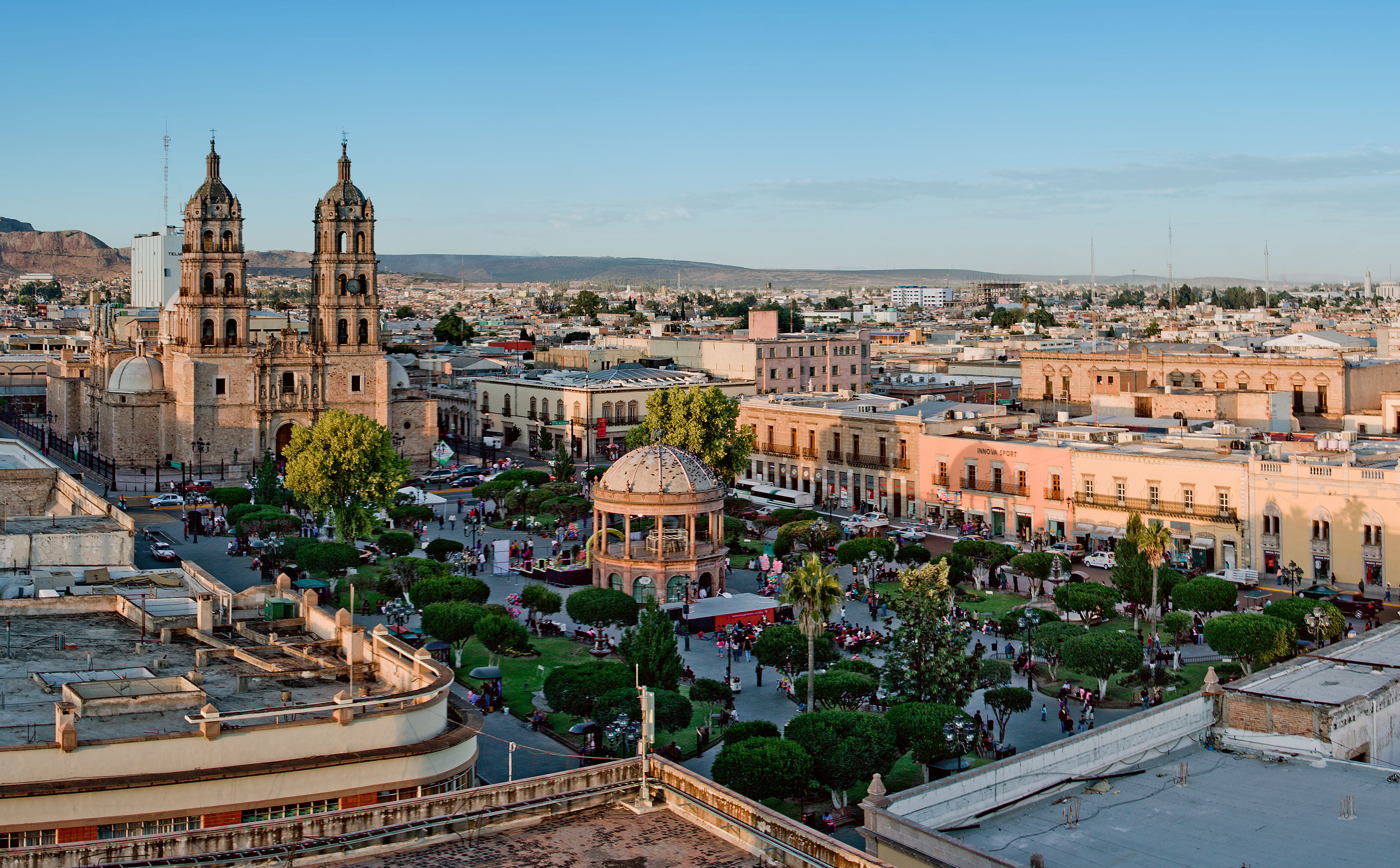
Plaza de Armas in the Historic centre of Durango

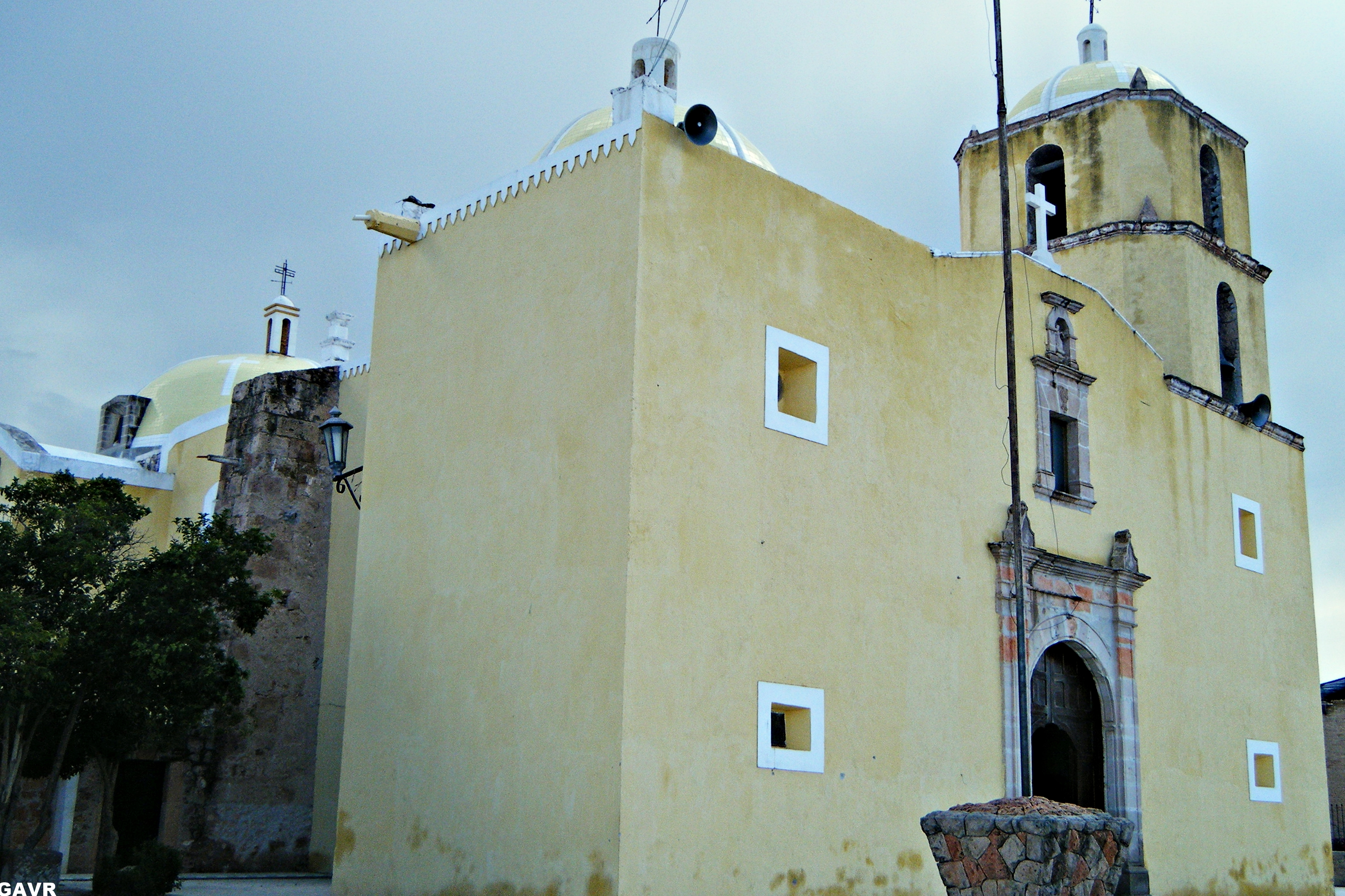
Templo de Cuencamé

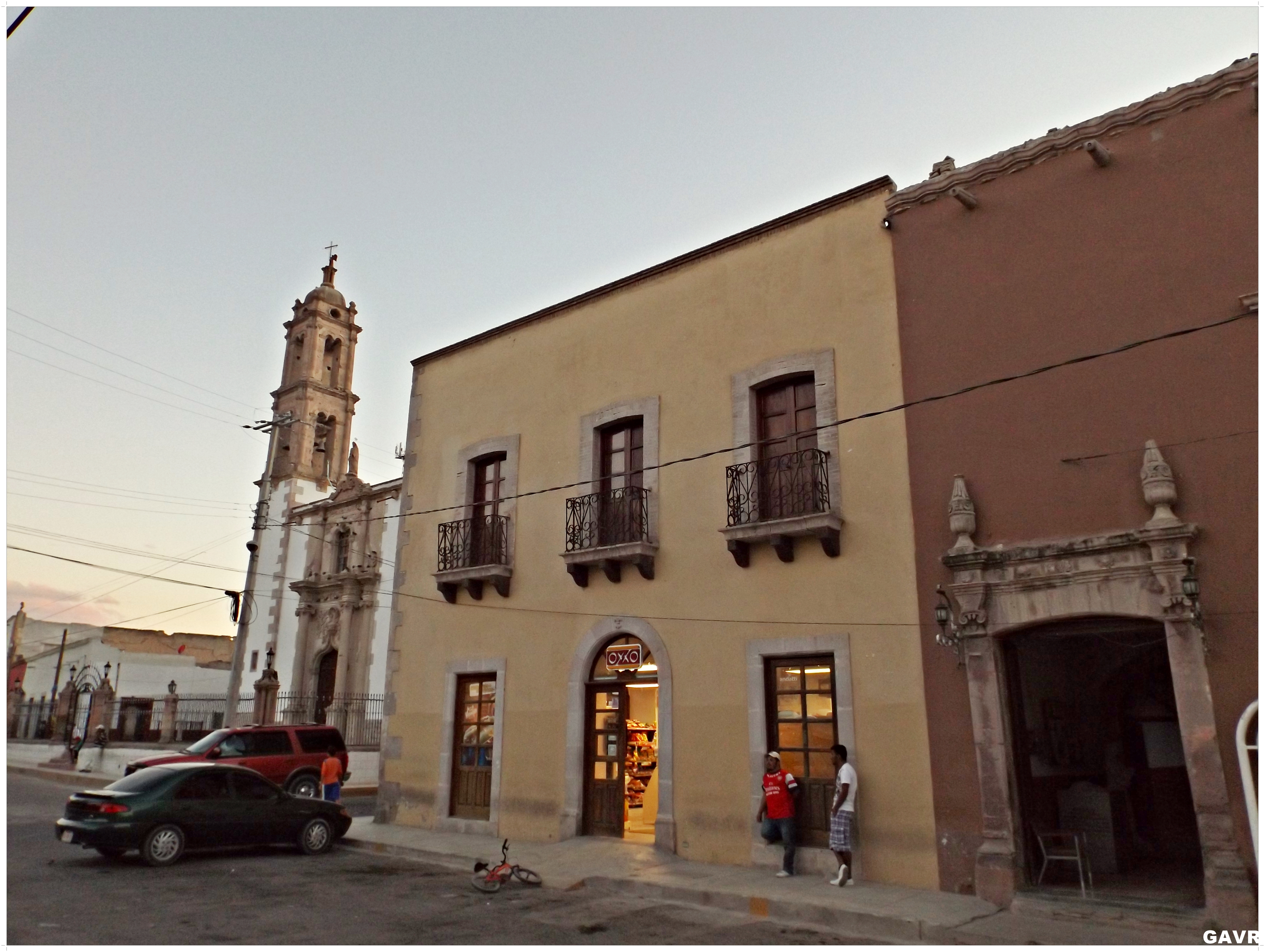
Town of Mapimí

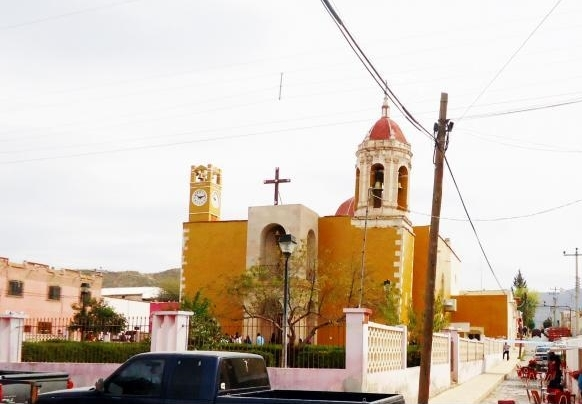
Town of Nazas

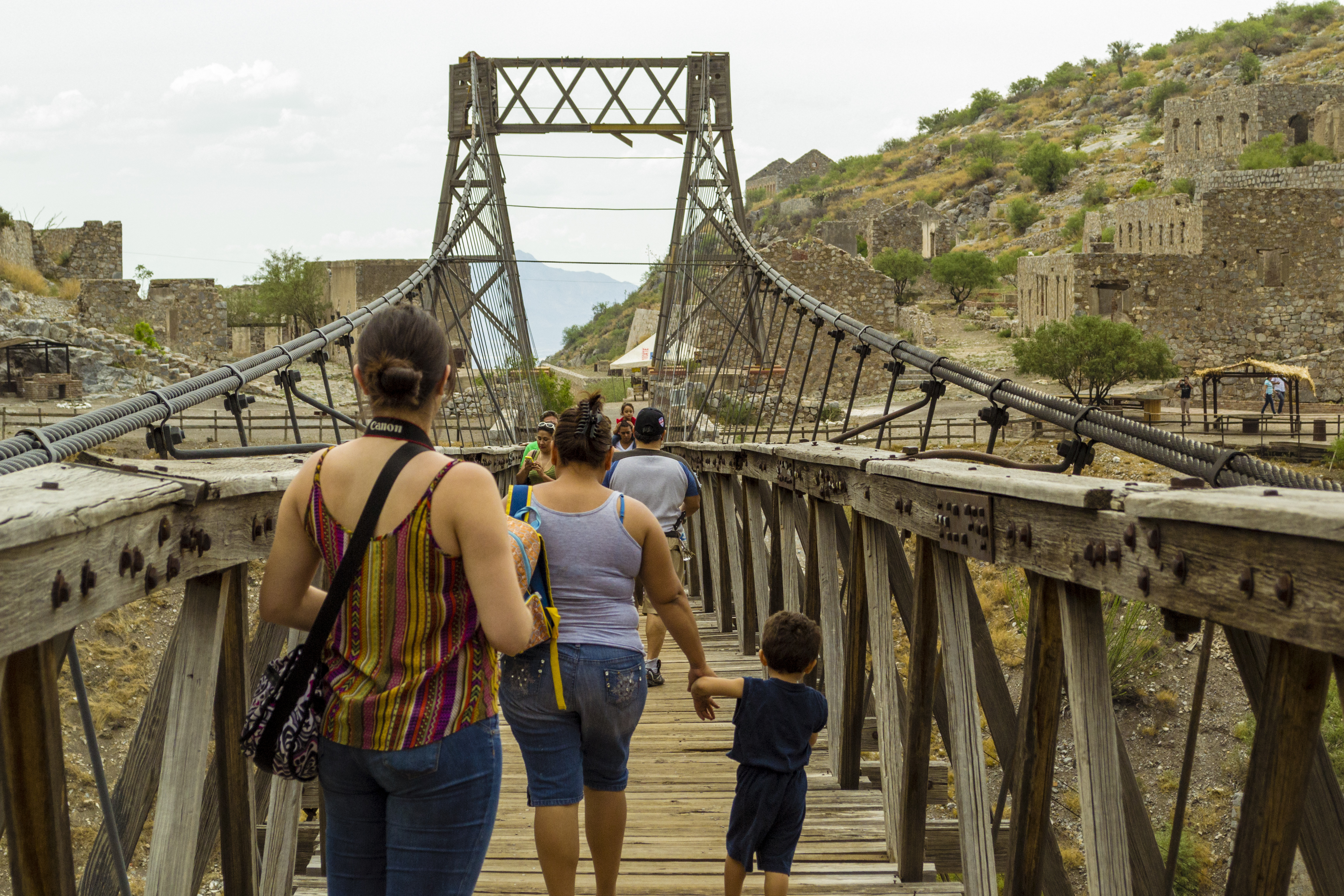
Ojuela Mine

==== State of Chihuahua ====
1351-059: Town of Valle de Allende.

===== Undeclared historic locations of the Camino Real in State of Chihuahua =====
- Santa Bárbara
- Parral
- Chihuahua
- Carrizal
- Laguna de Patos
- Ojo el Lucero
- Puerto Ancho
- Ciudad Juárez
  - Senucú
  - San Lorenzo
  - Misión de Nuestra Señora de Guadalupe
  - Presidio del Nuestra Senora del Pilar del Paso del Rio Norte

=== Location ===
Location of the sixty sites in Mexico inscribed as part of the El Camino Real de Tierra Adentro World Heritage Site

== National Historic Trail ==
In the United States, from the Texas–New Mexico border to San Juan Pueblo north of Española, the original route (at one point designated U.S. Route 85 but later superseded with US Interstate Highways 10 and 25) has been designated a National Scenic Byway called El Camino Real.

Pedestrian, bicycle, and equestrian trails have been added to portions of the trade route corridor over the past few decades. These include the existing Paseo del Bosque Trail in Albuquerque and portions of the proposed Rio Grande Trail. Its northern terminus, Santa Fe, is also a terminus of the Old Spanish Trail and the Santa Fe Trail.

Along the trail, parajes (stopovers) that have been preserved today include El Rancho de las Golondrinas. Fort Craig and Fort Selden are also located along the trail.

== CARTA ==
The El Camino Real de Tierra Adentro Trail Association (CARTA) is a non-profit trail organization that aims to help promote, educate, and preserve the cultural and historic trail in collaboration with the U.S. National Park Service, the Bureau of Land Management, the New Mexico Department of Cultural Affairs, and various Mexican organizations. CARTA publishes an informative quarterly journal, Chronicles of the Trail, which provides people with further history and current affairs of the trail and what CARTA, as an organization, is doing to help preserve it.

== Chihuahua Trail ==
The Chihuahua Trail is an alternate name used to describe the route as it passes from New Mexico through the state of Chihuahua to central Mexico.

By the late 16th century, Spanish exploration and colonization had advanced from Mexico City northward by the great central plateau to its ultimate goal in Santa Fe. Until Mexican independence in 1821, all communications between New Mexico and the rest of the world were restricted to this 1,500-mile (2,400 km) trail. Over it came ox carts and mule trains, missionaries and governors, soldiers and colonists. When the Santa Fe Trail was established as an overland route between Santa Fe and Missouri, traders from the United States extended their operations southward down the Chihuahua Trail and beyond to Durango and Zacatecas. Ultimately superseded by railroads in the 19th century, the ancient Mexico City–Santa Fe road was revived in the mid-20th century as one of the great automobile highways of Mexico. The part that runs from Santa Fe, New Mexico to El Paso, Texas, US State Highway 85, was pioneered by Franciscan missionaries in 1581 and may be the oldest highway in the United States.

== See also ==
- Camino Real in New Mexico - El Camino Real de Tierra Adentro
- El Camino Real (California) – the California Mission Trail
- El Camino Real de Los Tejas – El Camino Real from Texas east to Louisiana
- National Register of Historic Places listings in Socorro County, New Mexico
- Old San Antonio Road – a section of El Camino Real de Los Tejas
- Scenic byways in the United States
- Supply of Franciscan missions in New Mexico
