= Camino Real in New Mexico =

Road in North America

Camino Real de Tierra Adentro
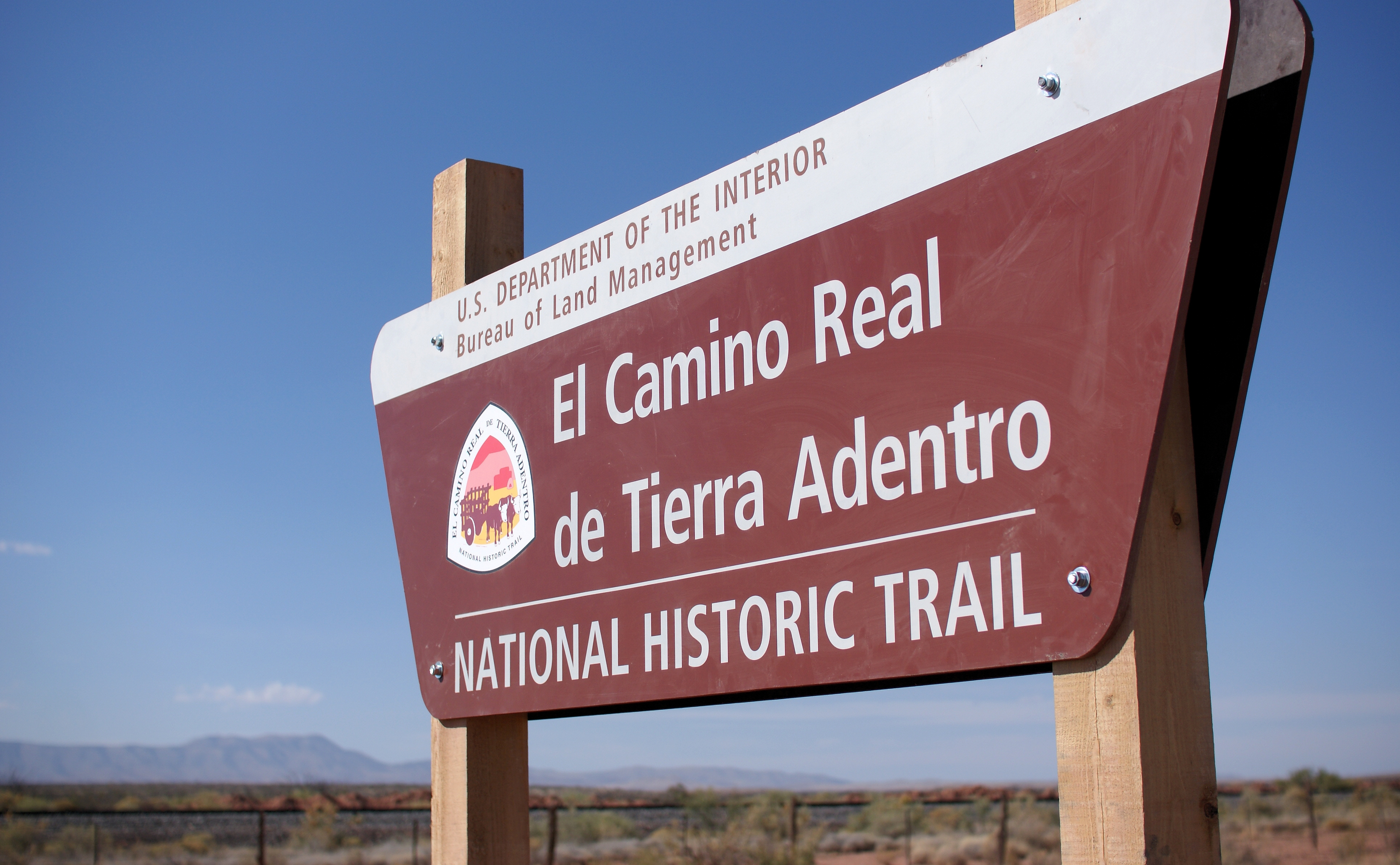
- The Yost Escarpment Trailhead sign in Truth or Consequences, New Mexico

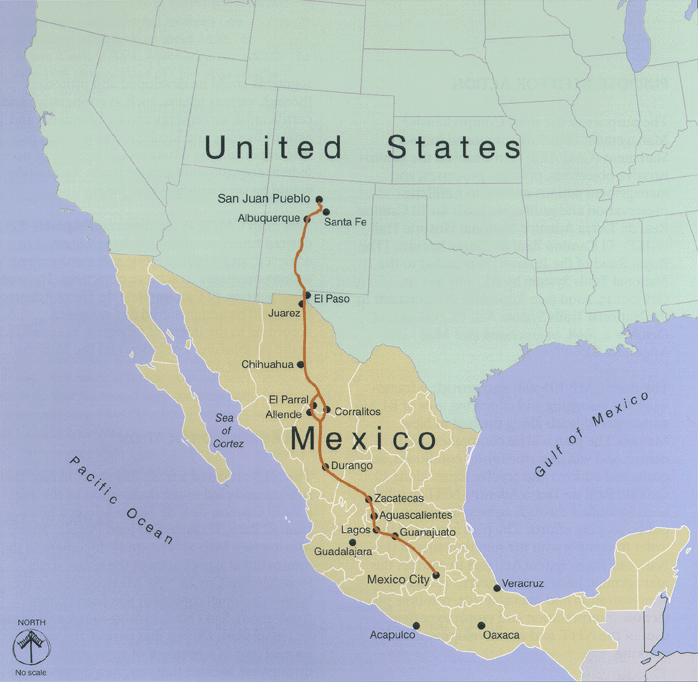
- Map of El Camino Real de Tierra Adentro
- Location: Mexico and the United States
- Governing body: Instituto Nacional de Antropología e Historia (Mexico); National Park Service, Bureau of Land Management (United States)
- Website: El Camino Real de Tierra Adentro National Historic Trail

UNESCO World Heritage Site
- Location: Mexico
- Criteria: Cultural: (ii), (iv)
- Reference: 1351
- Inscription: 2010 (34th Session)
- Area: 3,101.91 ha (7,665.0 acres)
- Buffer zone: 268,057.2 ha (662,384 acres)

The Camino Real, also known as the Silver Route, was a Spanish 2,560-kilometre-long (1,590 mi) road used from 1598 to 1882. It was the northernmost of the four major "royal roads" that linked Mexico City to its major tributaries during and after the Spanish colonial era. The northern part of this road ran through the Trans-Pecos part of what is now Texas to San Juan Pueblo (Ohkay Owingeh) in Santa Fe de Nuevo Mexico, now the state of New Mexico.

== Road sections on the National Register of Historic Places ==
Fourteen sections of the Camino Real (El Camino Real) in New Mexico were listed on the National Register of Historic Places in 2011, 2013, 2014, and 2018.

Some or all of them are parts of the Camino Real de Tierra Adentro (transl. Royal Road of the Interior Land), which was an historic 2,560-kilometre-long (1,590 mi) trade route between Mexico City and San Juan Pueblo, from 1598 to 1882. It was the northernmost of the four major "royal roads" that linked Mexico City to its major tributaries during and after the Spanish colonial era.

The listings are by county from the south to north:

- Doña Ana County (this county is on the border with Mexico)
  - 11000172 Camino Real–Rincon Arroyo–Perrillo Section, NRHP-listed April 8, 2011, Rincon Rincon Arroyo Perrillo
  - 11000166 Camino Real–San Diego North South Section, NRHP-listed April 8, 2011, Radium Springs
  - 11000165 Camino Real–San Diego South, NRHP-listed April 8, 2011, Rincon
- Sierra County (adjacent, to north of Doña Ana County)
  - 11000171 Camino Real–Point of Rocks Section, NRHP-listed April 8, 2011, northeast of Rincon, in the vicinity of the Point of Rocks, Sierra County
  - 11000163 Camino Real–Yost Draw Section, south of Aleman, NRHP-listed April 8, 2011, north northeast of Point of Rocks, southeast of Aleman in Sierra County Yost Draw
  - 11000167 Camino Real–Jornada Lakes Section, north of Aleman but south of Engle, NRHP-listed April 8, 2011, in Sierra County Jornada Lakes
- Socorro County (adjacent, to north of Sierra County)
  - 11000173 Camino Real–Qualacu Pueblo, NRHP-listed April 8, 2011, east of the vicinity of San Antonio Qualacu Pueblo
  - 11000164 Camino Real–San Pascual Pueblo, NRHP-listed April 8, 2011, southeast of the vicinity of San Antonio, New Mexico San Pascual Pueblo
  - 14000898 El Camino Real de Tierra Adentro–Arroyo Alamillo North Section, NRHP-listed November 5, 2014, vicinity of San Acacia

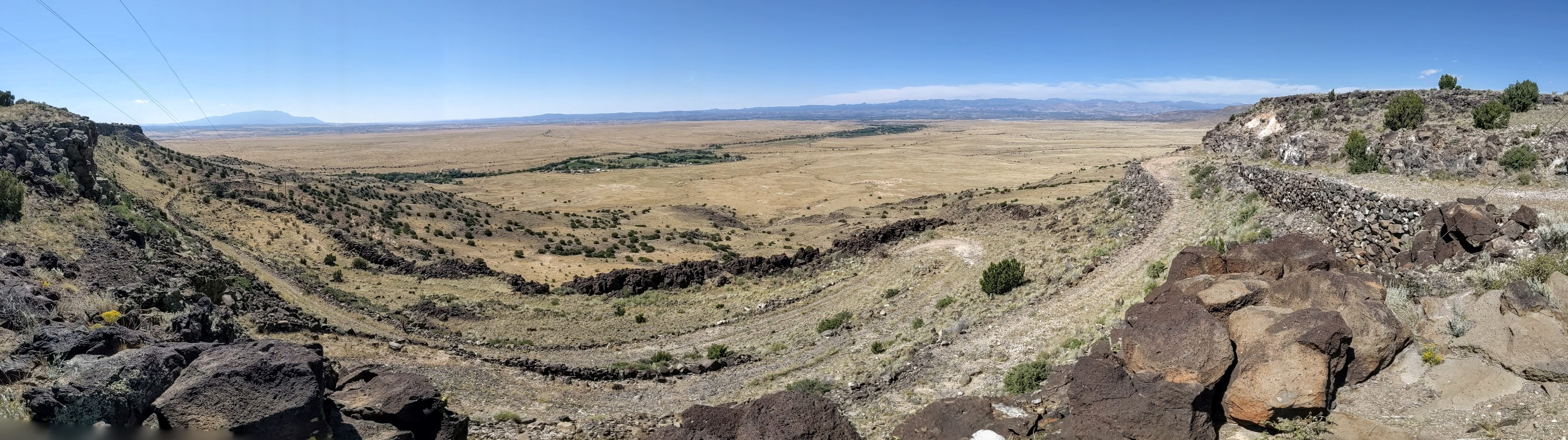
La Bajada Hill switchbacks, viewed from above on La Bajada Mesa, with La Bajada, New Mexico, in the valley of the Santa Fe River below

- Santa Fe County (further to the north)
  - 11000169 Camino Real–Alamitos Section, NRHP-listed April 8, 2011, Santa Domingo Pueblo.
  - 11000168 Camino Real–La Bajada Mesa Section, Santa Fe, NRHP-listed April 8, 2011, La Bajada Mesa
  - 11000170 Camino Real–Canon de las Bocas Section, NRHP-listed April 8, 2011,Santa Fe Canon de las Bocas
  - 13000774 El Rancho de las Golondrinas Section–El Camino Real de Tierra Adentro, Santa Fe
  - 13000775 La Cieneguilla South Section–El Camino Real de Tierra Adento, September 25, 2013, La Cienega
  - 100002204 El Camino Real de Tierra Adentro–La Bajada North Section, listed March 19, 2018, La Cienega
  - 100002205 El Camino Real de Tierra Adentro–La Bajada South Section, listed March 19, 2018, La Cienega

- Camino Real–Jornada Lakes Section
- U.S. National Register of Historic Places
- Nearest city: Engle
- Area: 98 acres (40 ha)
- Built: 1598
- MPS: Camino Real in New Mexico, AD 1598–1881 MPS
- NRHP reference No.: 11000167
- Added to NRHP: April 8, 2011

Camino Real–Jornada Lakes Section, near Engle, dates from 1598. It was listed on the National Register of Historic Places in 2011. It has also been denoted LA 71818.
