= Paraje =

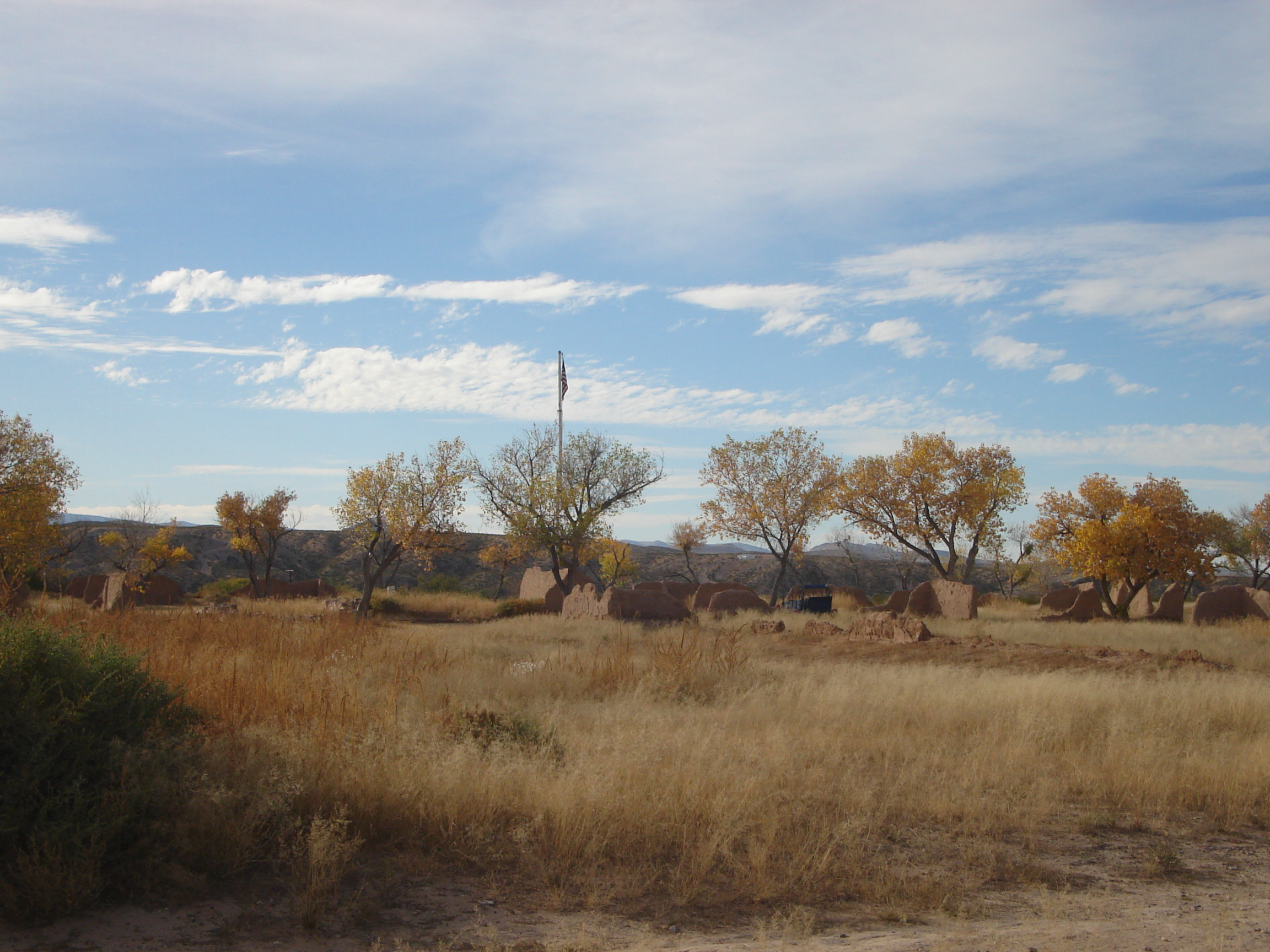
Remains of Fort Selden

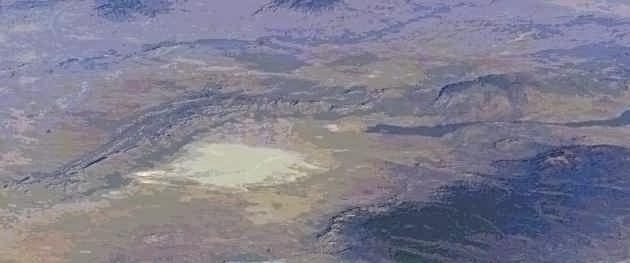
Jornada del Muerto

Paraje, a Spanish term meaning in English place or spot. Paraje is a term from the original Spanish speaking settlers, in use among English speakers in the southwestern United States, particularly in New Mexico, that refers to a camping place along a long distance trail where travelers customarily stopped for the night. A paraje can be a town, a village or pueblo, a caravanserai, or simply a good location for stopping.

Parajes typically are spaced 10 to 15 miles apart and feature abundant water and fodder for the travelers' animals (oxen, cattle, sheep, donkeys, mules and horses). The early Spanish caravans were largely ox-drawn carts and the oxen and herds of cattle and sheep could only make these short distances in a day without cost to the animals, because they needed to graze for several hours each day to stay in health. Horses and mules could make much longer distances in a day, up to 60 miles without cost to the animal, so long as they had water and grazing, but after a few days would have to graze and rest for a day or two to recover if grazing was not available. In the most arid desert regions of these routes it was sufficient if the paraje had water, scarce at the best of times, but lethal if not available to man or beast, particularly in the hot, dry seasons of the year.

A route between two parajes, that is difficult but must be traversed in one day because there is no water along the way, was known as a jornada. The Jornada del Muerto in New Mexico, probably the oldest and most well known of these jornadas, along the El Camino Real de Tierra Adentro had parajes along its course, from south to north:

- Paraje de Robledo, a paraje with grazing located along the Rio Grande, the last stop before entering the Jornada.
- Paraje de San Diego, a paraje located on a plateau overlooking the water and grazing below in the Rincon Valley on the Rio Grande.
- Paraje del Perrillo, a paraje located where two small waterholes were found in the Jornada in the vicinity of Point of Rocks.,
- La Cruz de Alemán a paraje with only a small, unreliable spring, named for the German fugitive that died of thirst there in 1670.
- Laguna del Muerto, a paraje at a desert playa, seasonally a lake, with grazing along its retreating shoreline.
- Paraje de Fray Cristóbal, a paraje with grazing along the eastern bank of the Rio Grande on the northern end of the Jornada.

The Jornada del Muerto is the most well known of these jornadas, but there were others. One was the jornada between Tucson and the Pima Villages on the Gila River. A second was the El Camino del Diablo, the route across the Sonoran Desert between Caborca, Sonora and the Yuma Crossing. A third was the Anza Trail between the Yuma Crossing and the coastal mountains of Southern California across the Colorado Desert.

In New Mexico, one notable paraje on El Camino Real de Tierra Adentro is El Rancho de las Golondrinas in La Cienega, New Mexico, located between the Rio Grande and Santa Fe, New Mexico, is a museum of an old paraje and of life in old Nuevo México.

== See also ==
- Paraje, New Mexico
- Paraje, Socorro County, New Mexico
