= District of New Mexico =

The District of New Mexico was a military district of the United States Army in the Territory of New Mexico that existed from 1865 to 1890. The District of Arizona and the District of New Mexico replaced the Department of New Mexico from June 27, 1865.

The District of New Mexico was subordinate to the Military Division of the Pacific from June 27, 1865 - July 1866. It was subordinate to the Department of the Missouri, from 1866 to 1890.

== Commanders ==
- Brigadier General, James Henry Carleton, June 27, 1865 - July 1866
- Lt. Colonel, James Henry Carleton, July 1866 - March 27, 1867
- Lt. Colonel, George Sykes, March 27 to April 11, 1867,
- Lt. Colonel, George W. Getty, April 11, 1867 - January 11, 1871
- Colonel Gordon Granger, April 29, 1871 - June 1, 1873
- ?, June 1, 1873 - October 31, 1875
- Colonel Gordon Granger, October 31, 1875 - January 10, 1876
- Colonel Edward Hatch, January 10, 1876 - October 30, 1881
- Colonel Ranald Slidell Mackenzie, October 30, 1881 - November 22, 1882,
- Colonel David Sloane Stanley, November 22, 1882 - February 21, 1883
- Brig. Gen. Ranald Slidell Mackenzie, February 21 to October 27, 1883
- Colonel David Sloane Stanley, October 27, 1883 - May 1, 1884
- ?, May 1, 1884 - November 6, 1884
- Colonel Peter Tyler Swaine, November 6, 1884 - March 2, 1885
- ?, March 2, 1885 - November 26, 1888
- Colonel Eugene Asa Carr, November 26, 1888 - Sept. 1, 1890.

=== Posts in the District of New Mexico ===
The following is a list of posts occupied by the U. S. Army and Union Army in the district at various times during the existence of the District of New Mexico.

- Post of Albuquerque (1846–1867), at Albuquerque
- Fort Marcy (1846–1867, 1875-1894), Santa Fe
- Camp Tecolate, (1850-1860, 1870?), Tecolote
- Fort Union (1851–1894), near Watrous
- Camp Magoffin (1854, 1863–1865), near Alto
- Fort Craig (1854–1885), 32 miles south of Socorro.
- Fort Stanton (1855–1896), near Capitan
- Fort Fauntleroy (1860-1861), Fort Lyon (1861-1862), Fort Wingate, (1868-1918), near Gallup
- Los Pinos Depot/Station, Camp at Peralta, or Camp Peralta (1862–1866), at Peralta
- Fort Sumner (1862–1869), at Fort Sumner
- Fort Wingate, or Fort El Gallo, (1862–1868), San Rafael
- Fort Bascom (1863–1870), 10 miles north of Tucumcari.
- Fort Cummings (1863–1873), Camp at Fort Cummings (1880 - 1884) and (1886) at Cooke's Spring
- Fort McRae (1863–1876), below Ojo del Muerto in McRae Canyon, west of Engle
- Fort Selden (1865–1877), at Paraje de Robledo, now Radium Springs
- Camp Lincoln (1865-1866), near Fort Union
- Fort Lowell (1866-1869), near Tierra Amarilla
- Camp at Baird's Ranch, (1866), near Albuquerque
