= Point of Rocks Tank =

Broken dam in New Mexico

- Location within New Mexico
- Interactive map of Point of Rocks Tank
- Location: Doña Ana County, New Mexico
- Coordinates: 32°45′16″N 107°00′19″W
- Type: Reservoir
- River sources: Rincon Arroyo
- Basin countries: United States
- Surface elevation: 4,344 feet (1,324 m)
- Settlements: Sierra County, New Mexico
- References: U.S. Geological Survey Geographic Names Information System: Point of Rocks Tank

Point of Rocks Tank is a former dam and reservoir now broken, on Rincon Arroyo in Doña Ana County, New Mexico. It lies at an elevation of 4,344 feet (1,324 meters) about 3 miles (4.8 km) south of Point of Rocks.

The site of this reservoir is thought to be formerly one of Los Charcos del Perrillo, two waterholes of the Paraje del Perrillo a stopping place on the Jornada del Muerto.
