= Fra Cristobal Mountain =

Mountain in New Mexico, United States

Coordinates: 33°28′12″N 107°05′55″W

Fra Cristobal Mountain is the highest summit of the Fra Cristobal Range in Sierra County, New Mexico. It is the peak in the northern end of the range, which gives the range its name. It rises to an elevation of 5,932 feet (1,808 m). The summit overlooks the Jornada del Muerto to the east.

== History ==
Fra Cristobal Mountain is said to have resembled the profile of a priest, Fray Cristóbal de Salazar, a cousin of Juan de Oñate, with the first colonizing expedition in 1598. The mountain marked the turn westward Jornada del Muerto toward the west where the trail passed through the Lava Gate to reach the Rio Grande.
