= Red Canyon =

Red Canyon may refer to:

== Film ==
- Red Canyon (1949 film), American western
- Red Canyon (2008 film), American psychological thriller

== Places ==
- Red Canyon (Douglas County, Nevada), U.S.
- Red Canyon (Caballo Mountains), New Mexico, U.S.
- Red Canyon (Fremont County, Wyoming), U.S.
- Red Canyon, in Dixie National Forest, Utah, U.S.
- Red Canyon Trail, or New Hance Trail, in Grand Canyon National Park, Arizona, U.S.
