= Lava Gate =

Narrow area in New Mexico

Coordinates: 33°29′24.3″N 107°03′48.1″W

Lava Gate is a narrow area in the Jornada del Muerto, in the southern part of Socorro County, New Mexico. The Lava Gate creates a gap that trends north northwest to south southwest, between the malpaís (lava fields) of the Jornada del Muerto Volcano to the northeast and the foothills of the Fra Cristobal Range to the southwest. Its midpoint lies at an elevation of 4,573 feet (1,394 meters). The Lava Gate provided a path for the Camino Real de Tierra Adentro from the interior of the Jornada del Muerto to the Rio Grande at Paraje, Socorro County, New Mexico.
