= Paraje, Socorro County, New Mexico =

Paraje Paraje de Fray Cristóbal
- Ghost town
- Location within New Mexico
- Coordinates: 33°33′23″N 107°03′25″W
- Country: United States
- State: New Mexico
- County: Socorro County
- Time zone: UTC-7 (Mountain (MST))
  - Summer (DST): UTC-6 (MDT)

Paraje was a populated place along the east bank of the Rio Grande, in Socorro County, New Mexico, United States, now a ghost town. It is located north northeast of the Fra Cristobal Range.

== History ==
=== Paraje de Fray Cristóbal ===
The site of Paraje was originally an area known to the first Spanish colonists of New Mexico as Paraje de Fray Cristóbal. It was a paraje, an unpopulated stopping place along the old Camino Real de Tierra Adentro from the sixteenth to the nineteenth centuries. It was the first watering and grazing place along the Rio Grande available, after the crossing of the Jornada del Muerto from the south or the last such stop before entering it from the north. Travelers passed through the north northwest–south southeast trending Lava Gate between the difficult terrain of the Jornada del Muerto Volcano malpaís (lava field) to the northeast of it and the foothills of the mountain range to the southwest which funneled travelers to the paraje on the Rio Grande. The paraje and the mountains to the south were named after a priest, Fray Cristóbal de Salazar, a cousin of Juan de Oñate, with the first colonizing expedition in 1598.

=== Paraje ===
Until after the establishment of Fort Conrad (1851) and later Fort Craig (1854), Paraje de Fray Cristobal, remained an unpopulated stopping place along the old Camino Real. The settlement of Paraje began about 1857 as an agricultural settlement and stopping place, that was ultimately populated by 200 people. They traded with the nearby forts and with passing travelers on the Camino Real de Tierra Adentro at the northern entrance to the Jornada del Muerto. It was the first water and grazing available along the Rio Grande after the crossing of the Jornada del Muerto from the south and the last before entering it from the north.

During the Civil War in 1861 - 1862, Paraje was briefly garrisoned by 140 New Mexican Militia men, including a detachment of Captain Hubbell's New Mexican Volunteer Cavalry Company, guarding against the Confederate forces to the south in Confederate Arizona. Captain Hubbell's detachment participated in the Skirmish near Fort Thorn on September 26, 1861. Between 1867 and 1910, Paraje had its own post office.

The population began to decline after the 1910s after the development of the plan to build a dam down river. By the end of the 1920s, Paraje became a ghost town. In 1942, the site was first submerged by the Elephant Butte Reservoir. Later exposed by the retreat of the waters of the reservoir, some ruins and artifacts can be seen in the area.
