= Aleman, New Mexico =

Aleman
- Locale
- Etymology: Alemán (Spanish for "German")
- Interactive map of Aleman
- Country: United States
- State: New Mexico
- County: Sierra
- Settled: 1868
- Abandoned: 1875
- Elevation: 4,669 ft (1,423 m)

Aleman is a locale, a formerly populated place in Sierra County, New Mexico, United States. It lies at an elevation of 4,669 feet (1,423 meters).

== History ==
=== La Cruz de Le Alemán ===
This locale was first a paraje at an unreliable spring in the Aleman Draw, along the route of the Camino Real de Tierra Adentro between Paraje del Perrillo and Laguna del Muerto in the Jornada del Muerto. It acquired its name following the discovery of the remains of a German merchant at that paraje in 1670. This man, Bernardo Gruber, accused of witchcraft, had escaped his prison and fled with the aid of an Apache friend, from the Inquisition in Santa Fe by trying to cross the desert to the south on the Camino Real. He had been forced to cross it in a bad time of the year when it was hot and in a season when no rains had yet fallen, and the Laguna del Muerto and then the spring at the next paraje was dry. Despite the attempt by his friend to get water to him in time, Gruber did not survive and only fragments of his body and garments were found later in the vicinity of the spring after they had been picked over and scattered by vultures and other scavengers. From that time that paraje was known as La Cruz de Alemán for Gruber's grave there. The tale of his death also gave the surrounding desert its name, Jornada del Muerto.

=== Alemán Ranch ===
The first settlement of the site of Aleman, was made in 1867 by Captain John "Jack" Martin (1830–1877) an ex-officer in the Union Army, one of the California Volunteers of the California Column, that came to New Mexico Territory in 1862. Captain Martin served first in Arizona Territory and then in New Mexico Territory at Las Cruces, serving in escorts of stagecoaches along the route of the Camino Real there, and especially that of the Jornada del Muerto, until his unit was mustered out at Las Cruces in 1866.

The following year, Captain Martin established a cattle ranch he called Alemán Ranch 32°59′40″N 106°59′58″W at the old paraje of Alemán, and began digging a deep well there in 1868, the first one dug in the Jornada del Muerto. Without taking any money from the Territorial Legislature or the Federal Government, he successfully struck water at 85 feet. He then charged travelers for his water and received a tax exemption for the business. He gave free water to the military and arranged to have a post of troops from Fort Selden at his ranch to protect travelers traveling through the Jornada del Muerto region. He also arraigned the first telegraph lines to Las Cruces.

The Alemán Ranch was much smaller than the Armendáriz Grant to the north, having an adobe ranch house facing the road with surrounding, corrals, stables and outbuildings. From the first it was a stagecoach stop that remained so until the 1880s when the railroad arrived and established a stop on the tracks nearby called Aleman. Martin also maintained a small hotel and established an Aleman post office at the site in 1869 that remained until it closed in 1890 and was replaced by one 2 miles north of San Diego Mountain near the Southern Pacific Railroad at Detroit, New Mexico from 1889 to 1892 when it moved to Rincon.

John Martin left the ranch in 1875 and moved to Santa Fe where he ran a hotel until he died in 1877. By the mid-1880s, Alemán Ranch became part of the Bar Cross Ranch, a huge ranch, some its land purchased from the Armendáriz descendants, that ran from Doña Ana County to near the vicinity of San Marcial, in Socorro County. Later, in the 1890s, its headquarters was moved to Alemán Ranch from Engle.

=== Climate ===
The climate of Aleman Ranch is typical of the climate of the Jornada del Muerto. Under the Köppen Classification, the climate of Aleman Ranch borders both desert (BWk) and steppe (BSk) climates.

Climate data for Aleman Ranch (1948-2000); 4,520 feet (1,380 m) above sea level; 33.00 N, 107.00 W.
Month	Jan	Feb	Mar	Apr	May	Jun	Jul	Aug	Sep	Oct	Nov	Dec	Year
Mean daily maximum °F (°C)	54.7 (12.6)	60.3 (15.7)	67.2 (19.6)	75.6 (24.2)	84.0 (28.9)	93.0 (33.9)	93.3 (34.1)	90.7 (32.6)	85.3 (29.6)	75.8 (24.3)	63.5 (17.5)	54.4 (12.4)	74.8 (23.8)
Daily mean °F (°C)	39.3 (4.1)	43.7 (6.5)	49.6 (9.8)	57.2 (14.0)	65.6 (18.7)	74.8 (23.8)	78.0 (25.6)	76.5 (24.7)	69.6 (20.9)	59.1 (15.1)	47.5 (8.6)	39.7 (4.3)	58.3 (14.6)
Mean daily minimum °F (°C)	24.0 (−4.4)	27.1 (−2.7)	31.9 (−0.1)	38.7 (3.7)	47.1 (8.4)	56.6 (13.7)	62.7 (17.1)	61.3 (16.3)	53.9 (12.2)	42.3 (5.7)	31.4 (−0.3)	24.9 (−3.9)	41.8 (5.4)
Average precipitation inches (mm)	0.43 (11)	0.33 (8.4)	0.30 (7.6)	0.20 (5.1)	0.39 (9.9)	0.70 (18)	2.02 (51)	2.02 (51)	1.43 (36)	0.89 (23)	0.51 (13)	0.75 (19)	9.97 (253)
Source: Western Regional Climate Center

== The site today ==
Buildings of the Bar Cross Ranch built on the site of the old Alemán Ranch can be seen north of County Road A039 to Spaceport America near its junction with the County Road A13 (Upham Road).

"Two ranches occupy the Spaceport America site. The Bar Cross Ranch and the Lewis Cain Ranch combined have grazing leases for the entire Spaceport site plus additional surrounding state and federal land. The ranches also own approximately 1,200 acres of land within the Spaceport site. The site is occupied by the respective ranch houses, a foreman’s house, and a number of water wells and associated pipelines owned by the ranches to support their operations."

"The State of New Mexico has entered into agreements with the Bar Cross and Lewis Cain Ranches to co-exist during the construction and ultimately the operation of the Spaceport. The goal of the Design Team was to minimize impacts on the ranchers to the extent possible."

== See also ==
- List of ghost towns in New Mexico
