= Paraje de San Diego =

Paraje de San Diego was a camping place, overlooking the Rio Grande, along the route of the Jornada del Muerto. It was located 5 leagues north of the Paraje de Robledo and "half a league from the river".

Bishop of Durango, Pedro Tamarón y Romeral, wrote of this location during his 1760 visitation to New Mexico:

"... on May 12, which found us in Robledo at a frosty dawn, when smokes were seen in the nearby Doña Ana sierra. This gave us some anxiety, but when we continued our journey, we began to realize that the great amount of smoke indicated that a forest was burning. And a little farther on, opposite the conflagration, we found a black cross about a vara and a half high and as thick as a man’s thumb at the side of the road, and at its foot a deerskin sack containing two pieces of fresh venison and a deerskin. The Apaches, who must have been in the Doña Ana sierra, put it there. By this means they indicated that they were at peace and that we should give them food and buy the deerskin. The experienced guides gave this interpretation. And therefore they left a knife in exchange for the deerskin and kept putting pieces of bread and tobacco leaf in the sack. And a short distance away, for we were on the lookout, two Indians on horseback were sighted. They were coming to see what had been left for them."

"On this day, the twelfth of the month and the sixth of the journey, we came to the Jornada del Muerto. To prepare for it, a detour is made to seek the river at a place called San Diego (paraje de San Diego). The night is spent there. Everything necessary is made ready. It is about half a league from the river. Barrels are brought for the purpose. These are filled with water for the people. On the morning of the thirteenth the horses were taken to the river to drink. Somewhat later all the food for the journey was prepared, and at half past seven we left that post with considerable speed, stopping only to change horses."

During this thirteenth day they had traveled 20 leagues until eight-thirty at night, when they halted opposite the Sierra de Fray Cristóbal. After a 10 league journey on 14 May, the Bishop reached the Rio Grande again at eleven‑thirty, at the Paraje de Fray Cristóbal, leaving the Jornada del Muerto.

The location given by Bishop Tamarón places Paraje de San Diego on the heights overlooking the Rincon Valley north of San Diego Mountain above Tonuco Draw, southeast of the location of Rincon, New Mexico. At the time the Bishop wrote the Rio Grande must have had a different course than today to be half a league away. It would have to pass close to the east side of the valley close to the foot of the bluffs where the paraje was located and at the foot of San Diego Mountain.
