= Gruet =

Gruet is a surname of French origin.

== People with the surname ==
- Aimé Gruet-Masson (1940–2014), French biathlete
- Jacques Gruet (died 1547), Swiss poet
- Justine Gruet (born 1989), French politician

== See also ==
- Gruet Winery
- Gruetli
