= Barbee Draw =

Valley in Doña Ana County, New Mexico, United States

Barbee Draw is a valley and an arroyo tributary to the Rincon Arroyo in Doña Ana and Sierra County, New Mexico. Barbee Draw heads at an elevation of 6,800 feet (2,100 meters) at 32°57′02″N 107°12′45″W on the east slope of the Caballo Mountains. It and its arroyo trends eastward down into the Jornada del Muerto then southeastward then south to its confluence with Rincon Arroyo at an elevation of 4,301 feet (1,311 meters). Rincon Arroyo is itself a tributary of the Rio Grande.
