= Tonuco Draw =

Tonuco Draw is an arroyo north of San Diego Mountain (Tonuco Mountain) in Doña Ana County, New Mexico. The mouth of the draw is located at an elevation of 4,019 feet (1,225 meters). The head of the draw is located at 32°35′57″N 106°57′40″W on the edge of the Jornada del Muerto plateau on the north slope of Tonuco Mountain.
