= Paraje del Perrillo =

Historic waterhole in New Mexico, USA

Paraje del Perrillo (Place of the Puppy), was a dependable watering and stopping place along the Camino Real de Tierra Adentro, where it passed through the Jornada del Muerto in the vicinity of Point of Rocks in Sierra County, New Mexico. Paraje del Perillo was the next water to the north beyond the Paraje de San Diego overlooking the Rio Grande 5 leagues beyond Paraje de Robledo and a half league from the River.

== History ==
The name of the place was coined during the initial crossing of the Jornada by the Oñate expedition on May 23, 1598. Oñate wrote they had traveled two days from the paraje, where they had just buried Pedro Robledo and were suffering from lack of water for themselves and their animals and were five or six leagues east of the Río Grande near the Point of Rocks. When one of their dogs returned with muddy paws, they went in search of the water following the tracks of the little dog that had found the water. Not far away in the direction of the river, Captain Gaspar Pérez de Villagrá and Cristóbal Sánchez each found a waterhole. The waterholes were named Los Charcos del Perrillo (The Puddles of the Puppy) and the stopping place became known as Paraje del Perrillo.

Paraje del Perillo was near where the trail of the Camino Real de Tierra Adentro passed Point of Rocks which is the southernmost point of the closed Jornada basin. From Paraje del Perillo the trail heads basically north through mesquite scrubland to another small intermittent watering place, La Cruz de Alemán, named for a fugitive German merchant who died of thirst there while attempting to cross the Jornada in the 1670s, at a time when it had no water.

From the beginning of the Spanish Colonial trade caravans between Santa Fe and Chihuahua City, Paraje del Perillo was the place that the soldiers guarding the caravans from Santa Fe handed it off to the escort for the journey to the south or picked it up when the caravan came north. Los Charcos del Perrillo were, long before the arrival of the Spanish, an important watering place for Apache in the Jornada region. The nearby Point of Rocks was used to watch and launch attacks on unwary travelers at or near this paraje.

== Locations ==
The location of these waterholes is thought to have been about three miles south of Point of Rocks at what is now the site of Point of Rocks Tank in Rincon Arroyo.32°45′16″N 107°00′19″W The other waterhole was a small pond in Rincon Arroyo or in the lower reach of Barbee Draw near Rincon Arroyo.
