= Engle Lake =

Lake in New Mexico, United States

- Location within New Mexico Location within the United States
- Location: Sierra County, New Mexico, United States
- Coordinates: 33°10′46″N 107°02′37″W
- Surface elevation: 1,437 m (4,715 ft)

Engle Lake, originally named Laguna del Muerto (Lake of the Deadman) by the Spanish, is a seasonal lake in the Jornada del Muerto region in Sierra County, New Mexico. It lies at an elevation or 4,715 feet (1,437 m) in the depression in the Jornada Del Muerto basin near the ghost town of Engle.

== History ==
Laguna del Muerto was an important paraje (stop) along the route of the Camino Real de Tierra Adentro in the Jornada del Muerto. It provided seasonal water and grass that grew in the lake bottom as the surface water dried up and even afterward the lake bottom retained the water within it for the grass. Once the lake was dry the only water available was at a spring, Ojo del Muerto, six miles to the west in Cañon del Muerto in the southern Fra Cristobal Range.
