= Jornada Lakes =

- Location within New Mexico
- Interactive map of Jornada Lakes
- Location: Jornada Del Muerto basin Sierra County, New Mexico
- Coordinates: 33°05′35″N 107°01′42″W
- Type: Ephemeral lakes
- Basin countries: United States
- Surface elevation: 4,688 feet (1,429 meters)
- Settlements: Engle, New Mexico
- References: GNIS

Jornada Lakes is a group of small ephemeral lakes in the upper part of the Jornada Draw in the Jornada Del Muerto basin in Sierra County, New Mexico. They lie along the Jornada Draw at an elevation of 4,688 feet (1,429 meters). They are crossed by Upham Road between Aleman and Engle, New Mexico.
