= McRae Canyon =

McRae Canyon originally known as Cañon del Muerto, is a canyon in the southern Fra Cristobal Range in Sierra County, New Mexico. Its waters are tributary to the Rio Grande, and today flow into the Elephant Butte Reservoir at the head of an inlet in the flooded lower canyon, at an elevation of 4,354 feet (1,327 meters). Its source is at 33°13′52″N 107°05′50″W, at an elevation of 5,070 feet (1,550 meters) in the southern Fra Cristobal Range.

McRae Canyon has one major tributary the Cañon del Muerto that has its confluence with McRae Canyon a short distance below that with an unnamed arroyo at 33°11′21″N 107°07′32″W. Just below this confluence is an artesian spring, that flows continuously from the Jornada del Muerto basin aquifer.

McRae Canyon is the site of Fort McRae manned by California Volunteers of the Union Army from 1863 to 1866, and by U. S. Army soldiers from 1866 to 1876.
