= Carrizozo volcanic field =

Volcanic field in New Mexico, United States

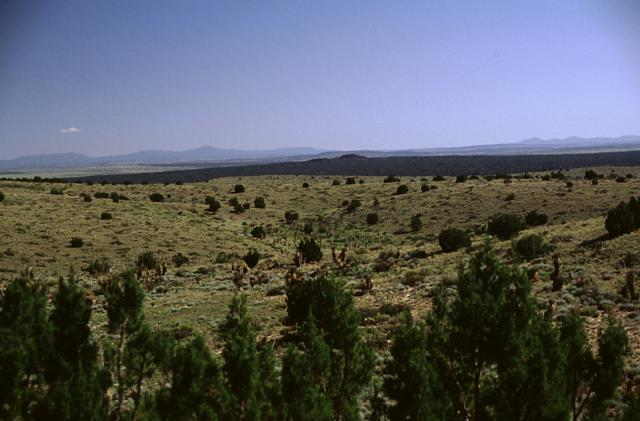

Highest point
- Elevation: 5,135 to 5,676 ft (1,565 to 1,730 m)
- Coordinates: 33°42′10″N 105°56′17″W

Geography
- Location: Lincoln County, New Mexico, United States

Geology
- Mountain type: volcanic field
- Volcanic zone: Rio Grande Rift
- Last eruption: 3250 BCE ± 500 years

The Carrizozo volcanic field is a monogenetic volcanic field located in the U.S. state of New Mexico. The volcanic field consists of two lava flows, the Broken Back flow and the Carrizozo lava flow (Carrizozo Malpais). Both lava flows originated from groups of cinder cones. The Broken Back flow is approximately 10 miles (16 km) long and the Carrizozo, one of the largest in the world, is 42 miles (68 km) long, covering 127 square miles (328 km^{2}) with a volume of 1.0 cubic mile (4.2 km^{3}).

== Carrizozo Malpais ==
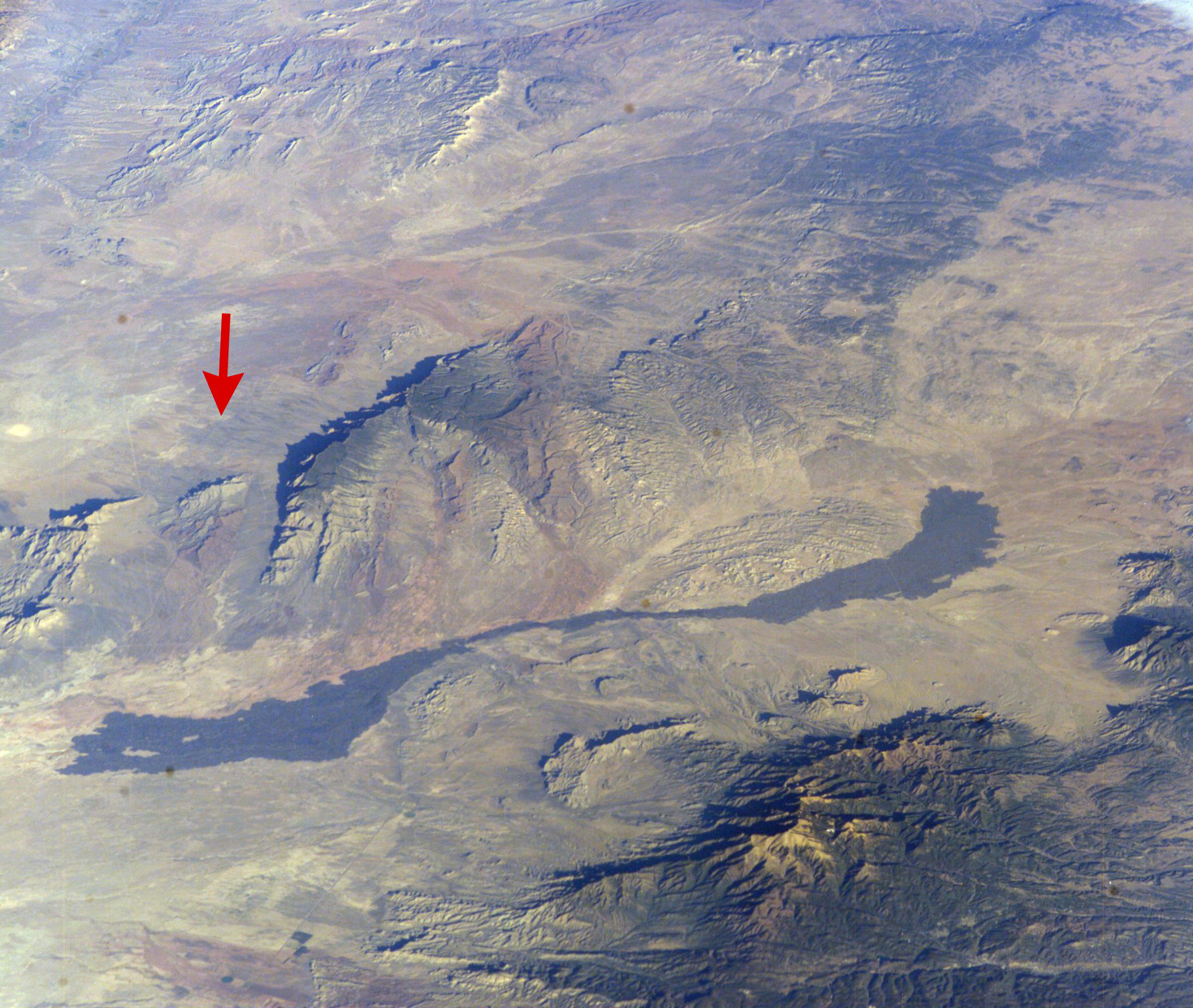
The Carrizozo Malpais is the long dark streak across the bottom half of the image. The red arrowhead marks the location of Trinity site. Sierra Blanca is visible at lower right. The low ridge toward the top of the photo is the Oscura Mountains. Credit: NASA Astronaut photograph ISS008-E-5604, taken at an altitude of 193 miles (311 km).

The Carrizozo Malpais is a large lava flow on the west side of Carrizozo, New Mexico, on the northern part of the Tularosa Basin between Sierra Blanca to the southeast and the Oscura Mountains to the west.

The lava making up the flow came from Little Black Peak, about 10 miles (16 km) north-northwest of Carrizozo. It reached about 40 miles (64 km) south-southwest along the bottom of Tularosa Basin in two active flows. Initial age estimates ranged from 1,000 to 1,500 years ago, but recent cosmogenic dating techniques revealed the eruption date is 5200 ± 700 years ago. At their southern end, the lava flows are about 12 miles (19 km) north of the dune fields of White Sands National Park. The Carrizozo Woman's Club helped protect this state area.

The lava flow is composed of pāhoehoe lava that spread through lava tubes. The eruptions are estimated to have lasted about three decades, and the extent of the flow reflects this long eruptive duration rather than a high eruption rate.

The Valley of Fires Recreation Area provides access to the Malpaís on its east edge, about 3 miles (4.8 km) west of Carrizozo on U.S. Route 380. The highway has several scenic overlooks where it crosses the Malpaís. The entire extent of the flow can be seen from higher elevations to the east on U.S. Route 380. The Trinity site, the first atomic bomb's detonation site, is 20 miles (32 km) northwest.

== Broken Back flow ==
The Broken Back flow erupted from vents (a north-trending fissure, Broken Back Crater, and an unnamed cinder cone) located about 6 miles (10 km) northwest of Little Black Peak. The flow covered an area of about 20 square miles (50 km^{2}) and is partially overlapped by the younger Carrizozo Malpais. This flow is significantly older than the Carrizozo Malpais, with an age estimated as 100,000 years, based on the degree of weathering and erosion.

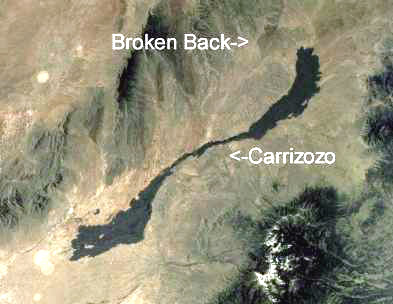
The location of Carrizozo.

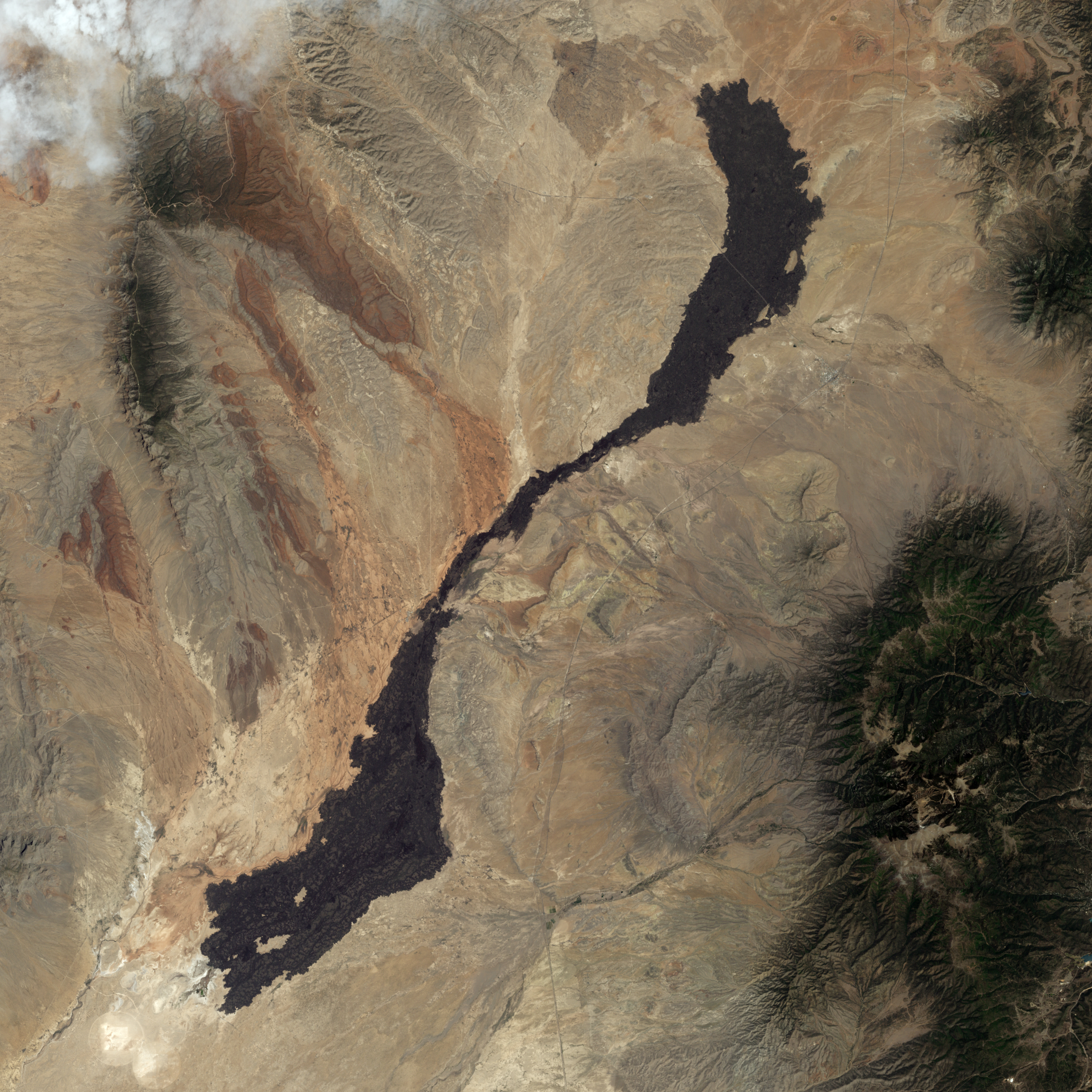
Satellite image of Carrizozo.

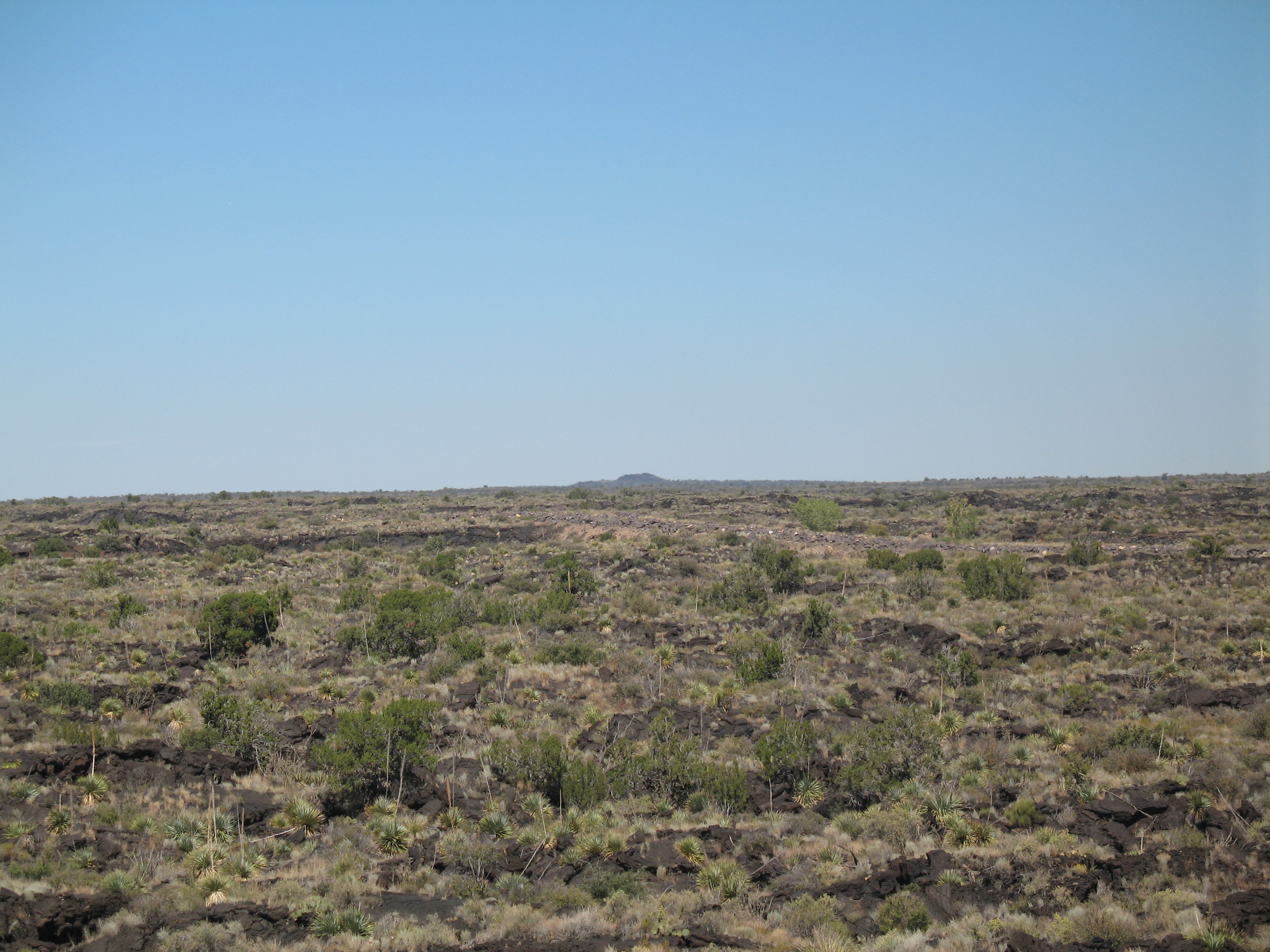
An overview of the lava flows (Little Black Peak in distance).

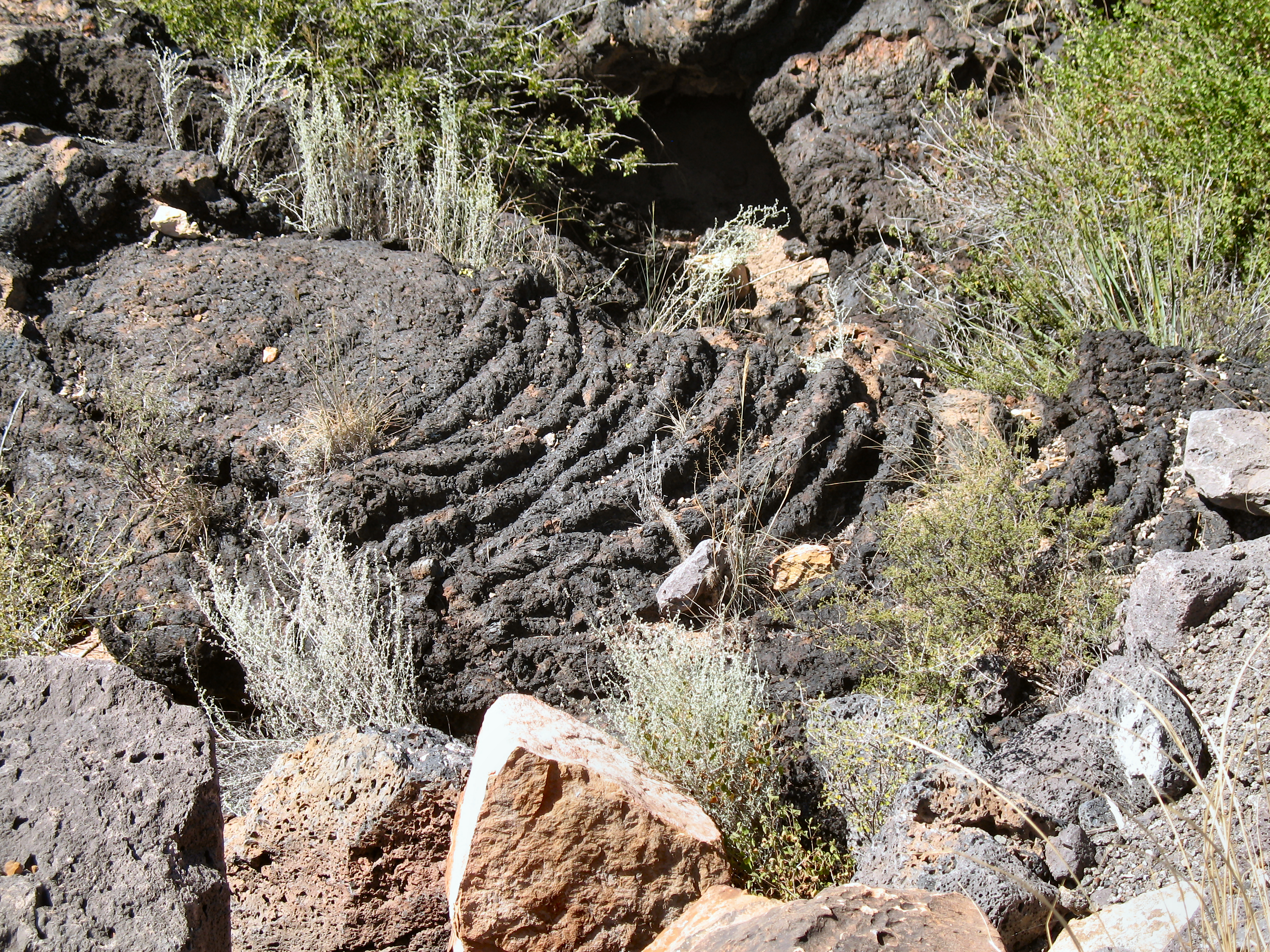
A close-up view of the lava flows, showing pāhoehoe (Hawaiian for "ropey") lava flow structure.

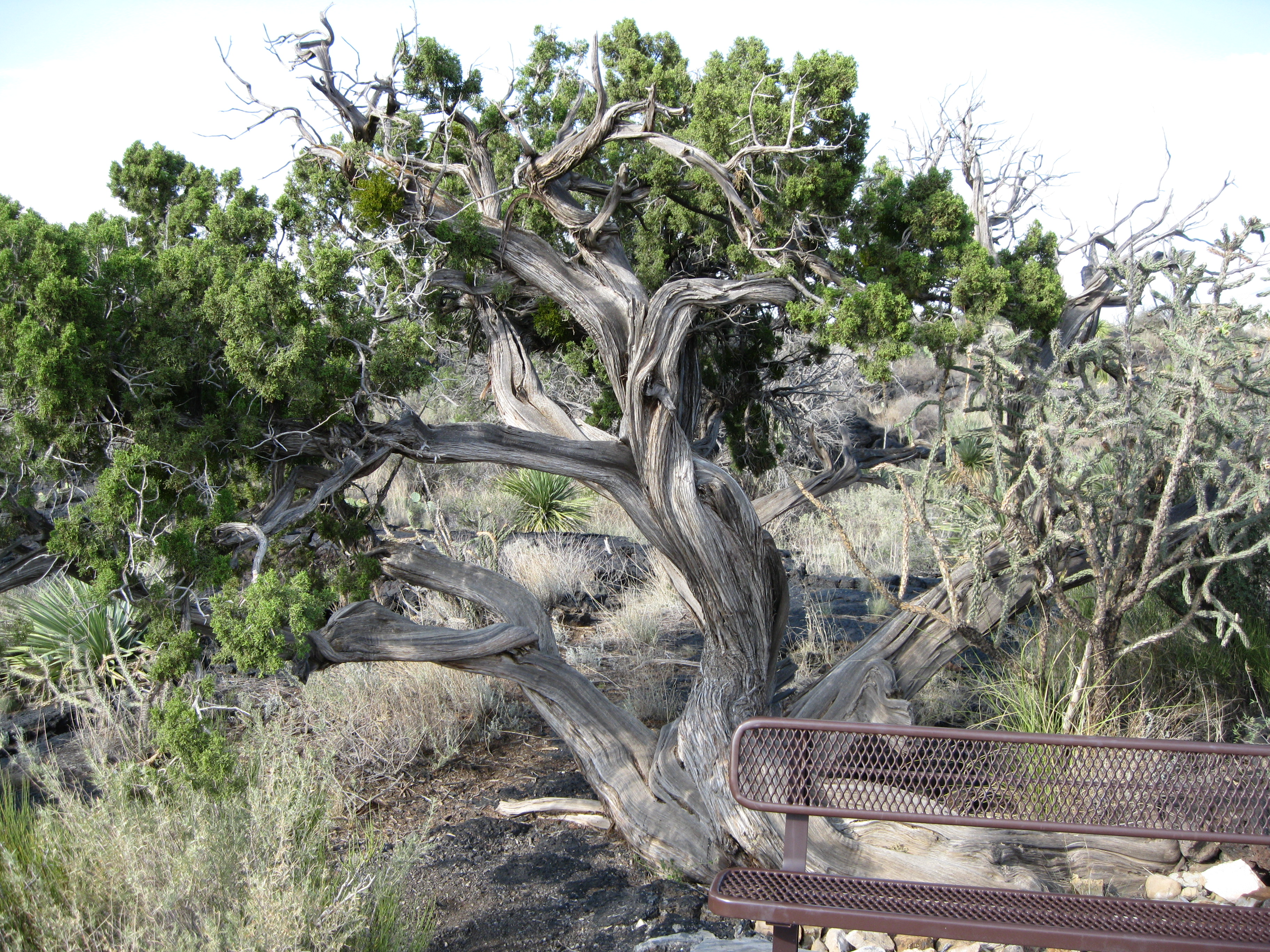
A western juniper tree grows out of the Carrizozo Malpaís.

== Geology ==
The volcanic field is associated with the Rio Grande Rift, a region of the Earth's crust that is being slowly pulled apart. This produces faulting that provides paths for magma to reach the Earth's surface from its upper mantle. The lavas erupted were mildly alkaline in composition, similar to the nearby Jornada del Muerto, Hillsboro, and Black Mesa (33.746°N 106.873°W) flows.

Seismic measurements in the region have detected a possible thermal anomaly associated with the volcanic field.

== Notable vents ==
Name	Elevation	Coordinates	Last eruption
Broken Back Crater	-	33°49′56″N 106°04′01″W	-
Little Black Peak	-	33°49′24″N 106°03′41″W	-

== See also ==
- Jornada del Muerto
- Jornada del Muerto Volcano
- List of volcanoes in the United States
- Lava plain
- Malpaís (landform)
