= Fort Thorn, New Mexico =

Fort Thorn or Fort Thorne, originally Cantonment Garland, was a settlement and military outpost located on the west bank of the Rio Grande, northwest of present-day Hatch, and west of Salem in Doña Ana County, New Mexico, United States. It was named for 1st Lt. Herman Thorn of the 2nd U.S. Infantry drowned in the Colorado River in 1849. He had previously been an aide to General John Garland, the new commander of the Ninth Military District, that encompassed New Mexico Territory in 1853.

== Location ==
In a September, 1856, Sanitary Report - Fort Thorn, Assistant Surgeon T. Charlton Henry described the location of Fort Thorn:

"The position of Fort Thorn is somewhat elevated above the level of the Rio Grande del Norte, whose waters pass within a mile of the post. Its distance is eighty-five miles below Fort Craig, on the western side of the river, and fifty-one miles above Fort Fillmore; the position of which latter post is on the eastern side of the Rio Grande. Two miles westward of Fort Thorn a llano of nearly thirty-five miles in width extends, but partially broken by a few undulating hills. This mesa forms an abutment of some thirty to forty feet upon the same elevation of ground on which Fort Thorn is situated. The river bottom is but a hundred yards in front of the post, with more or less growth of timber, principally the Salix viminalis and Populus canadensis. The broken and projecting portion of the mesa, to the westward, is mostly of red clay, and mingled with it is found a comparative abundance of native gypsum in laminated conglomerations and very scattered. The soil between the fort and the mesa westward is sandy, abounding in a low growth of prosopsis and artemisia. The post itself is on ground composed of a mixture of clay and sand, the former being uppermost."

"Eastward and across the river, five miles distant, is a chain of mountains, beyond which lies the Jornada del Muerto, through which passes the principal wagon road from Santa Fe to El Paso del Norte. At periods of overflow of the river, and during the early fall months, standing pools are formed about the vicinity of the post. Many of these pools are shaded by trees of the cottonwood species; only now, however, partially, much of the timber having been cut away."

"To the presence of these pools, and the thinning out of the trees about them, must be attributed, to a certain extent, the miasma which is the cause of the exceeding prevalence of remittent and intermittent fevers at this station."

The Geographic Names Information System (GNIS) has no coordinates listed for the location of Fort Thorne, nor for its elevation. However, there is one given in the September 1858 Sanitary Report - Fort Thorn, by Assistant Surgeon P. A. Quinan, that gave the location of the fort and described it:

"Fort Thorn is at a latitude 32°46′54″N, and longitude 107°20′49″W, is elevated 4,500 feet above the sea, and is located upon the right bank of the Rio Grande River. The post is, by an air-line, seventy-five miles west of Santa Fe, and 201 miles south of that place. By the wagon road, which follows the sinuousities of the river, the distance is estimated at 350 miles."

Unfortunately the coordinates Quinan gave for Fort Thorn there in his Sanitary Report are incorrect, the location given, 32°46′54″N 107°20′49″W being on a mountain ridge, not located along the west bank of the Rio Grande River as noted above, but farther west, nor is the elevation correct, land along the river being more near the 4,100 foot level.

However Quinan went on to describe the location of the fort and its surroundings:

"The post is opposite the Jornada del Muerto, from which it is separated by the river and a lofty range of mountains, a continuation of the Sierra San Mateo. The Mexican village of Santa Barbara is in the neighborhood of the garrison."

"Fort Thorn is located upon the immediate edge of an extensive marsh, the river making a considerable bend at this point, leaves exposed to the right, a crescentic flat, intersected by numerous sluices, and at times completely inundated. The buildings constituting the fort are placed within a stones throw of the swampiest portion of this flat or bottom, and in the most admirable manner, if the object be that the garrison shall inhale, for an average period of five months, the pestilential effluvia arising therefrom. The bottom referred to, presents during the hottest months, a surface of cozy mud, covered with green slime, and interpersed with pools of stagnating water, which surface is during these months gradually drying up. During the same time, a rank vegetation of weeds and grasses undergoes the process of germination, advancement to maturity, and decay. As might be expected, fevers of a malarious character, have greatly afflicted the command during this quarter."

Subsequently, during the American Civil War, Lt. Col. Edward E. Eyer, 1st Regiment California Volunteer Cavalry, gave precise mileage directions to the fort when he reported from there on July 6, 1862, on his march there on July 4–5, 1862 from Cooke's Spring on Cooke's Wagon Road:

"July 4, left Cooke's Spring at 6.30 a. m.; took Fort Thorn road, which keeps a north-northeast course, while the Mesilla road turns to the right immediately at the springs and bears east-northeast, passing the Overland Mail Station, which is seen on the hill about half a mile distant. Marched thirteen miles to Mule Spring; good road. Here no water could be found even by digging, having sent a party in advance with spades for that purpose. Left Mule Spring at 12 a. m.; marched twenty-two miles to the Rio Grande, and encamped at 7 p. m. near Fort Thorn. Course, north-northeast and northeast; thirty-five miles. The road for about eight miles after leaving Mule Spring is very good, when it enters a rolling country, the hills becoming more and more abrupt for a distance of about six miles, when it descends into a broad canon, which is followed on a good road to the river."

"July 5, moved three miles down the river to and reoccupied Fort Thorn; three miles."

In a subsequent report on August 30, he gave the mileage from Fort Thorn, down river past Santa Barbara to the southwest of the fort to the San Diego Crossing where he intended to cross the west bank of the river as 18 miles.

Fort Thorn was built midway between the village of Santa Barbara and the head of the wagon road that led westward toward the Santa Rita Copper Mines. This wagon road would have been Cooke's Wagon Road 3 miles up river from the fort that led westward to where the wagon road to the copper mines crossed it. This also means the location of Santa Barbara, was 3 miles down river below the fort.

After the Fort was abandoned, the location appeared on the 1860 and 1861 Public Surveys In New Mexico Territory sketch maps of the U.S. General Land Office. The 1860 map seems to show the military reservation around it more accurately.

== History ==
On November 11–12, 1846, 3 miles above what was later the site of Fort Thorn was the camp of Major Philip St. George Cooke and the Mormon Battalion who were tasked by Brig. Gen. Kerney with explore a route and building a wagon road from the Rio Grande valley to recently captured Alta California. This camp was the place where the road left the river to the southwest. This road would come to be called the Cooke's Wagon Road. According to Cooke, his camp lay across the river from the New Mexican settlement of San Diego, and was 258 miles southwest of Santa Fe, New Mexico. Cooke wrote that a road should be constructed running along the west bank of the river to the San Diego Crossing and from that crossing lead to the southern end of where the El Camino Real de Tierra Adentro began crossing the Jornada del Muerto, 5 miles to the east over a pass beyond it just below the San Diego Mountain. From the time of the 1849 California Gold Rush, a road through this gap in the mountains led from the Jornada road to the San Diego Crossing to the west bank of the river then followed it up river and west to Cooke's Wagon Road. Santa Barbara a New Mexican village was first established along that road west of the vicinity of modern Hatch in 1851.

=== U. S. Army Fort ===
Originally called Cantonment Garland, Fort Thorn was established December 24, 1853 by Captain Israel B. Richardson, under orders of General John Garland, with a garrison of 3rd U.S. Infantry from abandoned Fort Webster, on the right bank of the Rio Grande midway between Santa Barbara and the point where Cookes Wagon Road turned west from the Rio Grande. After Fort Craig was built, supplies came to the fort down from Santa Fe by the Fort Craig - Fort Thorn wagon road that closely followed Cooke's route down the west bank of the Rio Grande below Fort Craig. The post was built of adobe bricks, and included an enclosing wall, only the hospital being located outside it. The fort also had a 3.5 mile long acequia that brought water from the Rio Grande to irrigate the post's farms and powered a sawmill. It served to protect settlers and travelers against attacks by the Apaches and outlaws, before being closed in 1859. It had its own post office from 1855 to 1859. Besides the 3rd Infantry Regiment the main units operating from Fort Thorn were companies of the 1st United States Dragoons and later the Regiment of Mounted Rifles.

Fort Thorn was located near an extensive marsh, and malaria among the garrison became a serious problem there. Following many complaints and reports about the conditions and the debility of the garrison caused by malaria, the last of which was Quinan's, the post was closed in 1859.

=== Indian Agency (1859-1860) ===
An agency for the Apache Indians operated at the fort from 1854 and nearby even after the fort was closed into the early 1860s. Its agent was Dr.Michael Steck, trusted by Apache leaders and of whom Army officers in the New Mexico command wrote in a letter to president Peirce recommending his appointment, as having "knowledge of the country, and of the Indians, their language and habits." Also writing: "his appointment would give entire satisfaction to the military authorities." During the 1860 census taken on August 3 and 5, 1860, 32 persons were counted at the Fort Thorn township.

However the agency and the settlement of Santa Barbara nearby were abandoned in October 1860, following a Navajo raid on the agency reported in the October 25, 1860, Mesilla Times:

"Last week a party of Navajos made a decent on Fort Thorn and succeeded in driving off a lot of stock, besides killing one ox and wounding two others belonging to Mr. Barnes. They were pursued by a party of Apaches, overtaken, and all the property recovered, but the Indians succeeded in making their escape. The settlers at the fort, numbering some forty, apprehending a renewal of hostilities, have abandoned the place and come into the Mesilla valley for security. They brought with them several thousand stock. The settlement is consequently entirely broken up."

=== Use in the American Civil War (1861-1862) ===
During the American Civil War a site 15 miles upriver from Fort Thorn was the scene of the Skirmish near Fort Thorn. The engagement was between three companies of the Regiment of Mounted Rifles and Bethel Coopwood's cavalrymen of the Confederate Army on September 26, 1861. Subsequently, General Henry Hopkins Sibley, used the fort as an assembly point for his Sibley Expedition before invading northern New Mexico. In July and August 1862, detachments of the California Column used the fort, after Lt. Col. Edward E. Eyer, 1st Regiment California Volunteer Cavalry occupied it July 5, before crossing over the flooded Rio Grande two weeks later at San Diego Crossing to occupy Mesilla, New Mexico Territory and Franklin, Texas.

== Commanders ==
- Captain Israel B. Richardson, 3rd Infantry Regiment 11/1853 - 5/1854
- Major Enoch Steen, 1st United States Dragoons 5/1854 - 12/1854
- Lt. Col. Joseph H. Eaton, 3rd Infantry Regiment, 12/1854 - 6/26/1856
- Lt. Col. Dixon S. Miles, 3rd Infantry Regiment, 6/26/1856 - 1857
- Major Simpson, 1857
- Captain John Trevitt, 3rd Infantry Regiment, 1857
- Captain William H. Gordon, Regiment of Mounted Rifles, 1857
- Captain George W. Howland, Regiment of Mounted Rifles, 1857 - 1858
- Lt. H. C. Niell, Regiment of Mounted Rifles, 1858 - 1/1859

== Site Today ==
Most of the site of the fort was washed away in 1889, by a flooding of the Rio Grande that changed the course of the river. The remains of a post cemetery remain, an object of looting in recent years.

== In film ==
Fort Thorn was depicted in the 1950 film Two Flags West.
