= San Diego Mountain (New Mexico) =

Mountain in New Mexico, United States

Coordinates: 32°36′11″N 106°59′15″W

San Diego Mountain also known as Tonuco Mountain is an American summit 22 miles northwest of Las Cruces, New Mexico, in Doña Ana County. Its summit is at an elevation of 4,951 feet (1,509 meters).

== History ==
San Diego Mountain on the east bank of the Rio Grande, marked the location of the Paraje de San Diego one of the Spanish campsites along the El Camino Real de Tierra Adentro, in the Jornada del Muerto. The paraje was located just north of the mountain and was the last place to obtain water from the Rio Grande, half a league to the west, until the road reached the river again at Paraje de Fray Cristóbal 30 leagues from Paraje de San Diego.

San Diego Mountain later marked the location of the San Diego Crossing and the gap south of it, where the cutoff from the El Camino Real, crossed the Rio Grande to its junction with Cooke's Wagon Road. This junction was on the bluffs on the west bank overlooking the location where the Rio Grande made a great bend where it turned southeastward before turning south again just above the San Diego Crossing. Cooke's last camp before leaving the Rio Grande, was located across the river from "San Diego". Cooke's camp at the junction was near the site of Camp Garland and still later Fort Thorn.
