= San Diego Crossing =

Coordinates: 32°36′13″N 107°01′09″W

San Diego Crossing was a major ford on the Rio Grande in Doña Ana County, New Mexico, during the 19th Century. It was named for San Diego Mountain, on the east side of the Rio Grande, located directly west of the crossing. It was 11 miles north from Doña Ana, New Mexico, then 7 miles northwest from the Camino Real to the crossing and 17 miles along the west bank from the crossing to their last camp along the river before their junction with Cooke's Wagon Road.

In 1849, it was described in the diary of Robert Eccleston, who was traveling west from the Jornada del Muerto with the wagon train of a party of 49ers on October 6, 1849:

"...after getting over the hill from which we could see the river, the oxen had to pull heavy to get through the sand. The valley looked pretty from the eminence on the hill, but no encampment was in sight on either side of the river. ... We came up to our boys & proceeded to the ford. We crossed safely, but No.1 got stuck, & I had to return with our two lead yoke to draw them up. Even with 5 yoke we could hardly stir the load, as, the ground being spongy, the wheels sunk in the sand. The distance in crossing is some 300 yards, as we follow up the middle ground some distance after crossing half way, part of which was bare."

"We camped below where we came out & nearly opposite the entering of the ford on the margin of the river. ... Exactly opposite our camp is the Mountain (San Diego Mountain) of brownish hue, with dark green shrubbery distributed here and there."

In August 1862, during the American Civil War, Lt. Col. Edward E. Eyre, 1st Regiment California Volunteer Cavalry, gave precise mileage from Fort Thorn down the west bank of the Rio Grande to the San Diego Crossing as 18 miles. He gave the location of the head of Cooke's Wagon Road as a further 3 miles up river from the fort.
