= San Marcial, New Mexico =

San Marcial
- Ghost town
- Location within New Mexico
- Coordinates: 33.70007°N 106.98725°W
- Country: United States
- State: New Mexico
- County: Socorro County
- Established: 1854, 1866
- Time zone: UTC-7 (Mountain (MST))
  - Summer (DST): UTC-6 (MDT)

San Marcial was a community in Socorro County, New Mexico, United States, founded in 1854 and survivor of two floods and a fire, but is now a ghost town, a deserted site with little left of the original town, destroyed in a great flood in 1929. San Marcial was approximately 25 miles (40 km) south of Socorro.

== History ==
=== Foundation ===
San Marcial was founded circa 1854 by Pascual Joyla, who built a house on the east side of the Rio Grande and began selling produce and firewood in Fort Conrad, to the north. A small community grew up around Joyla's house, taking its name from the third century Frenchman, Saint Martial of Limoges. A flood wiped out the village in 1866, and the people relocated to the other side of the river.

In July 1881, a fire almost completely destroyed the new community.

The town was rebuilt, and became a center for the surrounding irrigated farms,

=== Prosperity ===
When the railway passed through the area in the 1880s, a new community initially called "New San Marcial" developed near the railway station to the west. This later obtained the Post Office name of San Marcial. Between 1890 and 1920, San Marcial was the second largest town in Socorro County. San Marcial attained a population of about 1,400 by 1929.

In 1917, the villages to the south of the community were ordered to evacuate, since they would be flooded by the Elephant Butte Reservoir. Many of them moved to San Marcial or to Val Verde. In 1920, a flood caused great destruction in the region, leaving many homeless. After this, much work was spent on flood defenses.

=== Abandonment ===
On 13 August 1929, following heavy rain, there was a massive flood in the area. According to the Socorro Chieftain of 17 August 1929:

Flooded Rio Grande Devastates Entire Towns; People Escape in Night Clothes – The first disaster occurring at 2:00 o'clock Tuesday morning (Aug. 13) when the highway bridge at San Acacia gave way sending a five foot flood through the town, giving many only time to escape to the foot hills to the west in their night clothes. Orchards, alfalfa fields with other valley crops in this district as well as at Polvadero and Lemitar are reported a total loss. From San Acacia to Lemitar, the water was spread out on both sides of the railroad three miles from bank to bank. With women and children safely out of town, men at San Marcial were fighting in the midst of crumbling structures in a last desperate effort to save their town from total destruction.

Some residents tried to rebuild after the August 13 flood, but a second flood on September 23 put an end the town. The main employer, the Santa Fe Railroad, had enough and pulled out. Without the trains and the Harvey House, there was no reason for anyone to stay, although as late as the 1930 census a few people lingered on.

Today, a cemetery remains the only obvious sign of the former settlement, although parts of the Santa Fe Railroad's roundhouse can still be found if one knows where to look.
