= Malpaís de Güímar =

Coordinates: 28.312°N 16.371°W

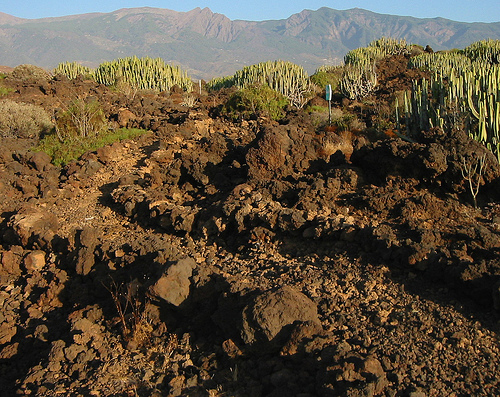
Trail though the Malpaís de Güímar

Malpaís de Güímar or Badlands of Guimar consist of a volcanic cone, subsidiary cones, and several basaltic lava flows in the Güímar municipality on the island of Tenerife, in the Canary Islands, Spain. They total in area about 290 hectares. The lava flows are quite recent, with the typical ʻaʻā type less than 10,000 years old. The large cone is called Montaña Grande (Big Mountain) and reaches a height of 276 m (906 ft).

== Geography ==
The Malpaís de Güímar were formed by a series of volcanic eruptions, the most recent and most evident occurring from fissures in the side of the Montaña Grande cone less than 10,000 years ago. Two peaks from former eruptions stand above the lava plain, Montaña de la Mar ("Mountain of the Sea") and Las Morras del Corcho ("Cork Bluff"). In addition to aa lava flows, there have been pyroclastic eruptions of ash and volcanic bombs that formed the various cones. The crater of Montaña Grande is about 300 meters in diameter and about 50 meters deep. It has a certain asymmetry, being wider towards leeward due to the action of the wind during its period of formation. The shore line has eroded since the last eruptions, and beaches have formed in a few areas. In places lava tubes have been exposed. Notable is Cueva Honda ("Deep Cave"), which was formed by a large gas bubble within a lava tube.

== Climate ==
There is little rainfall, and what does fall is quickly transported away from the surface by the volcanic soil. The area is washed by the tradewinds, and temperatures vary between a 17 °C average in January and 23 °C in August. In addition the area has a very high rate of days of sunshine, upwards of 2,500 hours per year. The relative humidity hovers around 70%.

== Nature Reserve ==
In 1987, part of the Malpaís de Güímar was set aside as a protected park called the Reserva Natural del Malpaís de Güímar. In 1994, a new law reclassified the protected natural space of the Malpaís de Güímar as a Special Natural Reserve and established an Area of Ecological Sensitivity. In 2006, the rest of the undeveloped Malpaís de Güímar were included with the Reserve.

== See also ==
- Malpaís
