= Selden Hills =

Coordinates: 32°32′02″N 106°57′41″W

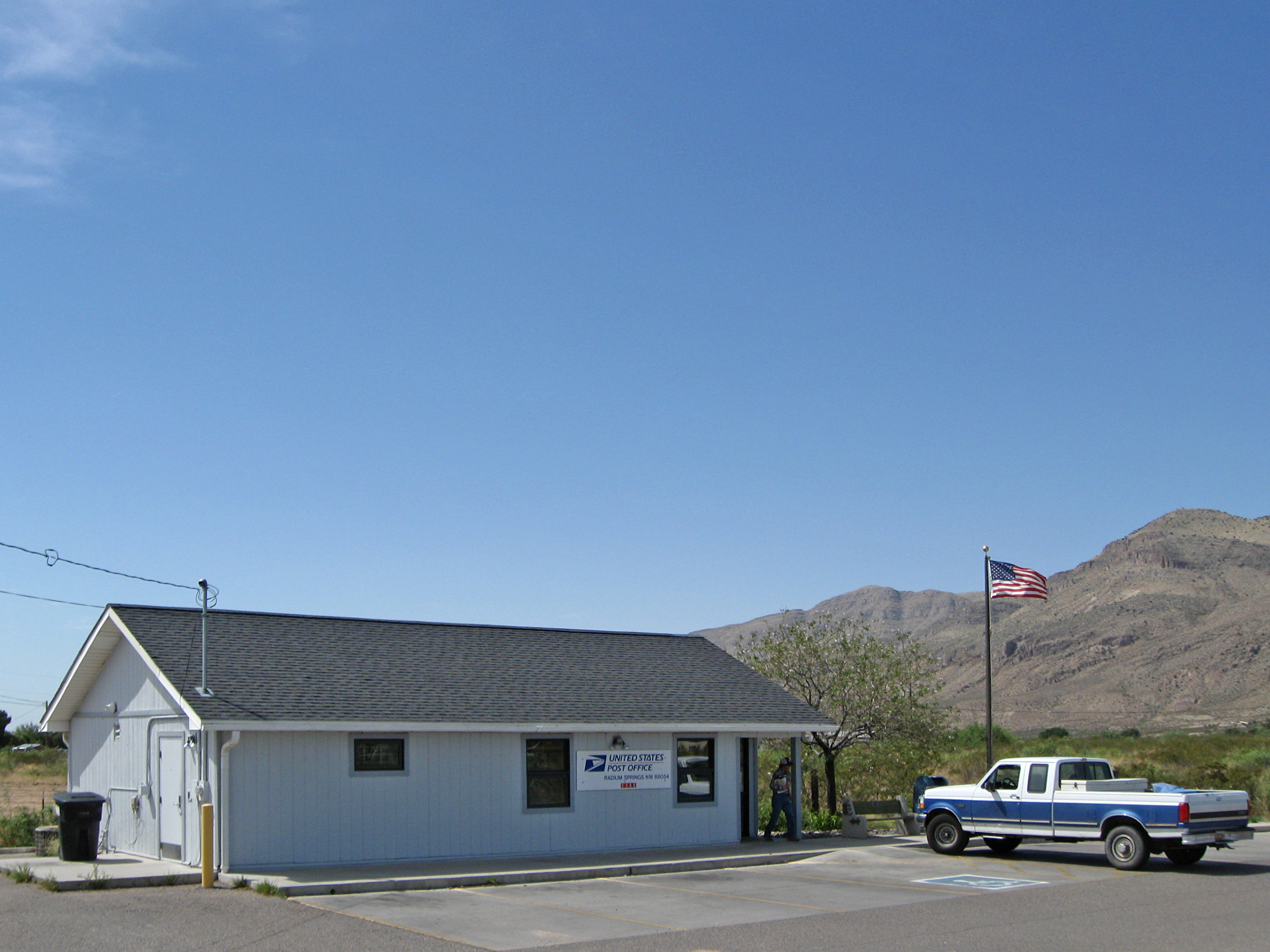
Selden Hills in background

Selden Hills are a range of hills in Doña Ana County, New Mexico. They lie just over a mile northwest of Radium Springs east of the Rio Grande at the lower end of Rincon Valley. They are named for Fort Selden that was located nearby to the southeast.
