= Red Canyon (Douglas County, Nevada) =

Valley in Nevada, United States

Coordinates: 38°50′56″N 119°25′33″W

Red Canyon is a valley in the U.S. state of Nevada.

Red Canyon was named from the reddish character of its hills.
