= Engle, New Mexico =

Engle
- Unincorporated community
- Location within the state of New Mexico Engle (the United States)
- Coordinates: 33°10′37″N 107°01′53″W
- Country: United States
- State: New Mexico
- County: Sierra
- Elevation: 4,777 ft (1,456 m)
- Time zone: UTC-7 (Mountain (MST))
  - Summer (DST): UTC-6 (MDT)
- ZIP code: 87935
- Area code: 575
- GNIS feature ID: 888887

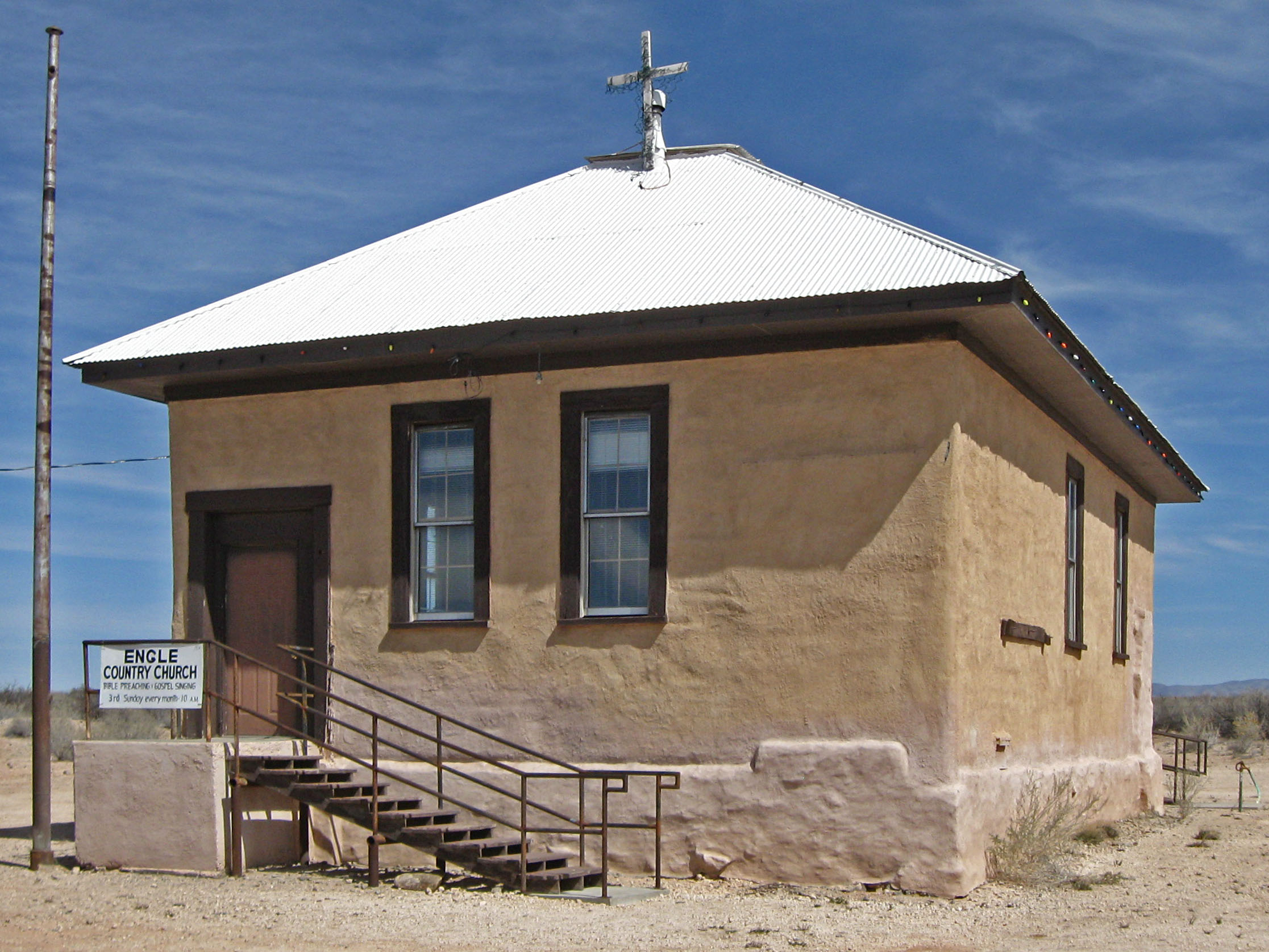
Engle Country Church, formerly the Engle school built in 1909.

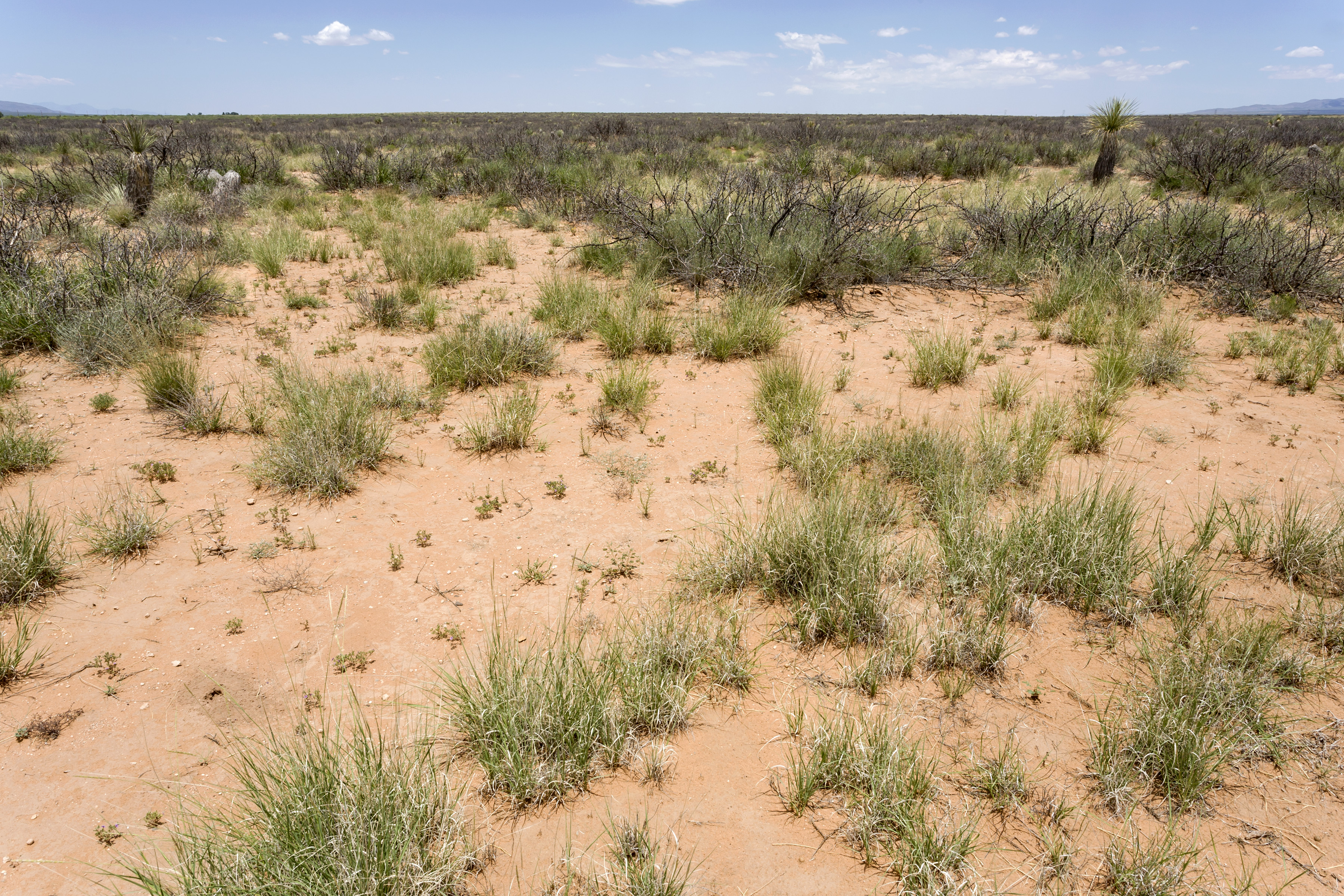
The Jornada del Muerto terrain two miles south of Engle

Engle is an unincorporated community and ghost town in Sierra County, New Mexico. Engle is in the Jornada del Muerto desert which is almost uninhabited in the 21st century. Truth or Consequences, 16 mi (26 km) distant by highway is the nearest town.

Engle was a station on the Atchison, Topeka and Santa Fe Railway. New Mexico State Road 51 passes through the community. Elephant Butte Reservoir and Truth or Consequences lie to the west and the San Andres Mountains and the White Sands Missile Range are to the east.

== History ==
El Camino Real de Tierra Adentro passed through the vicinity of Engle; two former segments of the road near Engle are listed on the National Register of Historic Places. West of Engle is Engle Lake originally known as the Laguna del Muerto (Lake of the Dead Man). It was a paraje, one of the few along this route through the Jornada del Muerto with reliable seasonal water and grass that grew on the lake bottom following the retreating waters of the evaporating lake. If the lake was dry, stock had to be driven to water at the spring Ojo del Muerto, six miles west in the Fra Cristobal Range.

Engle was founded in 1879 and named after railroad engineer, R.L. Engle. It was a watering stop along the Santa Fe Railroad which traversed the Jornada. Miners and prospectors came into the area but mining proved to be unprofitable. In 1896, ranchers began driving herds of cattle across the Jornada to the railroad. Engle was a watering hole for the cattle, a shipping point, and a rest stop for cowboys. The town had several saloons. Drought and overgrazing quickly ended that era of prosperity. The construction of nearby Elephant Butte Dam between 1911 and 1916 created jobs and led to a population of about 500. By the late 1920s, the population had declined to 75. In 1945, the U.S. government created White Sands Missile Range which cut off access eastward to Tularosa and left Engle more isolated. In 1955 the post office in Engle closed.

In 1983, the Gruet Winery established a 75 acres (30 ha) vineyard at Engle. The Noisy Water Winery later purchased the vineyard which in 2025 was its largest vineyard. Spaceport America, 12 miles (19 km) south of Engle, opened in 2011. Guest accommodations for visitors to Ted Turner's Armendaris ranch, opened in 2022, are located in Engle.

== Education ==
Truth or Consequences Municipal Schools is the school district for the entire county. Truth or Consequences Middle School and Hot Springs High School, both in Truth or Consequences, are the district's secondary schools.

== Notable person ==
- Rudd Weatherwax, actor, was born in Engle.
