= Gruet Winery =

Gruet Winery is a New Mexico winery and family business founded in 1984. It specializes in traditional method sparkling wines using Pinot Noir and Chardonnay grapes, and also produces some still wine.

== History ==
It traces its history to Gilbert Gruet's Champagne house, Gruet e Fils, which he established in 1952 in Bethon, France. After a visit to New Mexico in 1983 and meeting with a group of European vinters who had successfully planted vineyards there, Natalie and Laurent Gruet planted an experimental vineyard of Chardonnay and Pinot Noir in Engle, New Mexico about 10 miles from Truth or Consequences. The first release was in 1989, principally sparkling wine. In 1993, Gruet opened its own winery and tasting room in Albuquerque.

Gilbert's son Laurent became the chief winemaker in 1987. Sofian Himeur, the grandson of Gilbert Gruet, briefly served as assistant winemaker before leaving to work at Iron Horse, and then VARA Winery & Distillery.

Initially, the production was marketed to restaurants, including to sommeliers in New York, where it became a favorite. Over thirty years, production increased from 2,000 cases to 200,000 cases annually. As of 2017, it had become New Mexico's largest wine producer. Domaine Saint-Vincent Méthode Champenoise is their entry-level sparkling wine.

In 2015 Gruet was purchased by Precept Wine of Seattle, Washington.

== Reception ==
Gruet has been called by Vinepair "America’s best sparkling wine.” Wine Spectator rated its non-vintage brut sparkling wine at 90 points, and in 2017 ranked Gruet's Brut as a top 100 value wine. Bon Appétit called it as "crisp, dry, [and] elegant", and a "best bang for your buck". Martha Stewart Living praised its sparkling rosé.

In blind tastings in the Champagne region, against French champagnes, its blanc de blanc placed second and third. At the 2020 San Francisco International Wine Competition, Gruet's Blanc de Noirs won gold, and its Blanc de Blancs won silver. The same year, it also won gold for its Brut Rose, and silver for its Blanc de Noirs and Blanc de Blancs at the Houston International Wine Competition and gold medals for its Sauvage and Brut Rose at the Sunset International Wine Competition.
