= Jornada del Muerto Volcano =

Volcano in New Mexico, United States

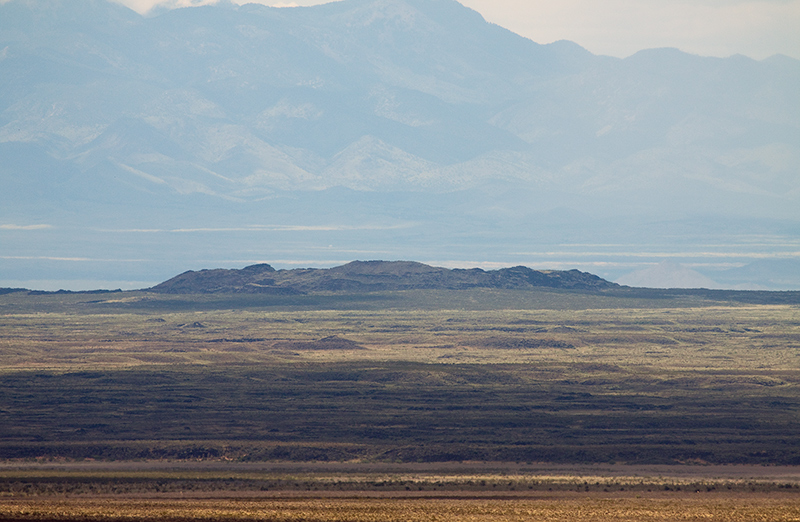
- View north across the malpaís lava field to the Jornada del Muerto Volcano splatter cones

Highest point
- Elevation: 5,137 ft (1,566 m) NAVD 88
- Coordinates: 33°32′04″N 106°52′00″W

Naming
- English translation: Dead Man's Route
- Language of name: Spanish

Geography
- Location within New Mexico
- Location: Socorro County, New Mexico, U.S.
- Topo map: USGS Harriet Ranch

Geology
- Rock age: 760,000 years
- Mountain type(s): Basaltic shield volcano, volcanic field
- Last eruption: 760,000 years

Climbing
- Easiest route: Scrambling over rough ʻaʻā lava

The Jornada del Muerto Volcano is a small shield volcano and lava field in central New Mexico, about 10 by 15 miles (16 by 24 km) in size and reaching an elevation of 5,136 feet (1,565 m). Jornada del Muerto means "Dead Man's Route" in Spanish, referring to the desolate colonial era trail from New Spain through this Malpaís region.

== Geography ==
The volcano and lava field is located at the northern end of the Jornada del Muerto Desert basin in the Basin and Range Province. The Jornada del Muerto basin runs between the Oscura Mountains and San Andres Mountains on the east, with the Caballo Mountains and the Fra Cristóbal Range on the west.

== Geology ==
=== Volcano and cones ===
The main volcano vent is located slightly to the east of the center of the lava flows, rising about 150 feet (46 m) in a broad but conspicuous cone about a mile (1.6 km) in diameter. Within the outer cone are a series of nested spatter cones interspersed with lava pools. On the south side the innermost spatter cone rises to nearly 90 feet (27 m) above the surrounding lava pools, and surrounds an intact symmetrical crater 245 feet (75 m) across and about 30 feet (9 m) deep.

=== Volcanic field ===
The volcano erupted about 760,000 years ago in a series of basaltic flows. It produced a slow and viscous ʻaʻā lava volcanic field which has a very rough and uneven surface, making travel across it extremely difficult and hazardous; also time-consuming. The total volume of erupted material is about 3 cubic miles (13 km^{3}) and the lava fields cover an area of over 170 square miles (440 km^{2}).

The largest individual flow-field extends from a center in extreme southeastern Socorro County and extends into Sierra County. Currently the flow forms the east bank of the Rio Grande from Fra Cristóbal north to Fort Craig, but at the time of eruption it temporarily dammed the Rio Grande.

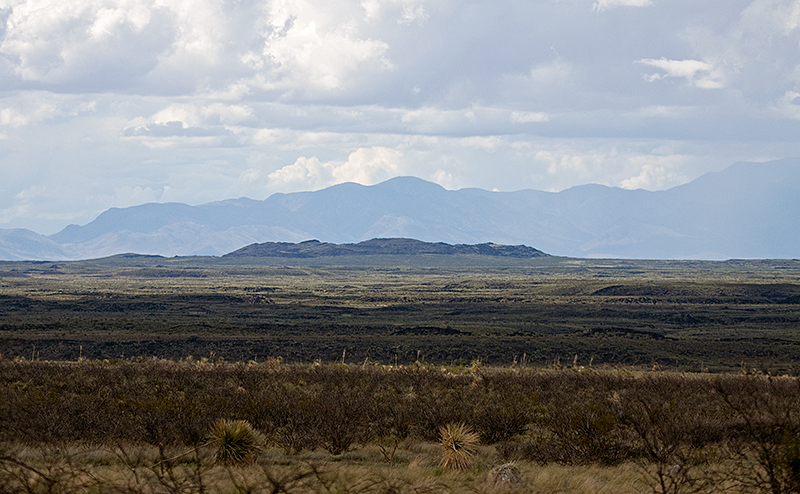
View north to the malpaís lava field and a spatter cone

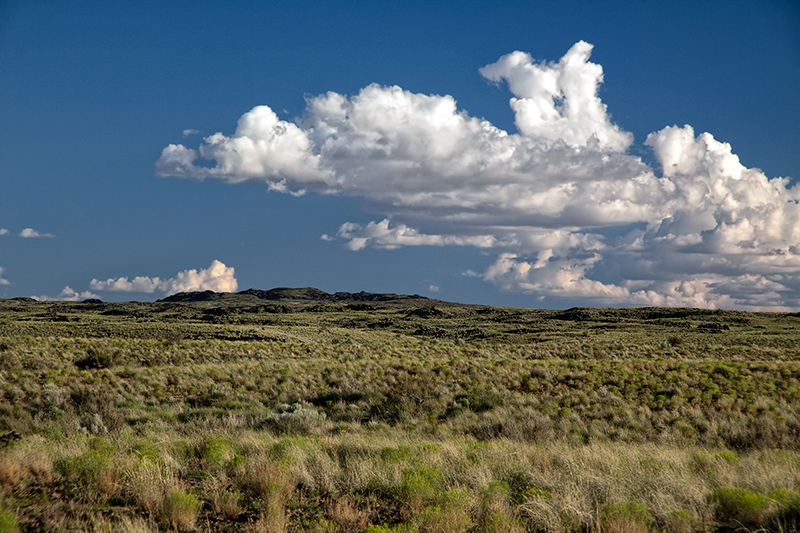
View south towards the nested splatter cones

== See also ==
- Carrizozo Malpais
