= Red Canyon (Caballo Mountains) =

Canyon in New Mexico, United States

Red Canyon is a canyon in the Caballo Mountains in Sierra County, New Mexico. The canyon has its head on the west slope of the mountains at 33°00′05″N 107°09′51″W. It descends westward to its mouth where the canyon emerges from the mountains near where its wash confluence with the Rio Grande at an elevation of 4,232 feet (1,290 meters).
