= Rincon Arroyo =

Location
- Doña Ana County, New Mexico

Physical characteristics
- Source: Point of Rocks
  - location: Sierra County, New Mexico
  - coordinates: 32°47′49″N 106°59′28″W
  - elevation: 4,600 feet (1,400 meters)
- Mouth: Rio Grande
  - location: Doña Ana County, New Mexico
  - coordinates: 32°39′14″N 107°04′16″W
  - elevation: 4,029 feet (1,228 meters)

Rincon Arroyo is a tributary stream or arroyo to the Rio Grande, in Doña Ana County, New Mexico. Its mouth is located at an elevation of 4,029 feet (1,228 meters) at its confluence with the Rio Grande in Rincon Valley. Its source is located at an elevation of 4,600 feet (1,400 meters) on the south slope of the hills of the Point of Rocks in Sierra County, New Mexico.
