= Malpaís (landform) =

Rough and barren landscape of relict and largely uneroded lava fields

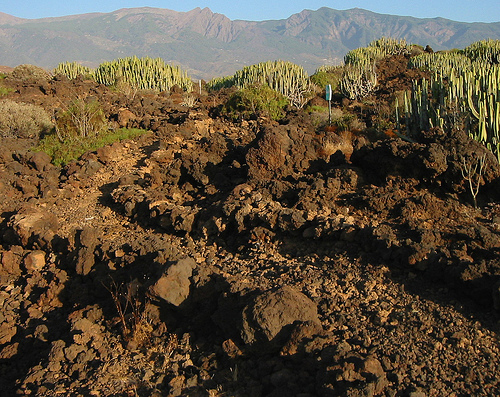
Malpaís de Güímar on Tenerife, Canary Islands

Malpaís, in the Southwestern United States, Spain, Mexico, and other Spanish-speaking regions, are rough and barren landscapes that consist of relict and largely uneroded lava fields exhibiting recognizable lava flows, volcanic cones, and other volcanic landforms. This type of volcanic landscape is extremely rough and difficult to traverse. It is characteristic of arid environments because in more humid climates, such rough terrains are smoothed by erosion and vegetation.

While the term describes many xeric places, it is strongly associated with Spanish-speaking countries and the Southwestern United States, where Spanish settlers named this landform.

== Etymology ==
A loanword from Spanish, malpaís is in wide use in English in the southwest United States. The literal translation of malpaís is "badcountry." Other Spanish terms for badlands are tierras baldías and cárcava.

== Badlands landform ==
The word 'malpaís' in Spanish roughly translates to "badland," and this describes the area as being extremely rough and difficult to traverse and unusable for crops. Although a malpaís is often another word for the badlands that form by erosion of sedimentary rocks in the same environment, a malpaís is often associated with such types of lava plain terrain as found in a volcanic field. The geology of malpaís terrain is bare to thin layers of soil over lava with sparse vegetation. The lava fields usually consist of lava tube systems, sinkholes, pyroclastic deposits from cinder cone volcanoes, and ʻaʻā and pāhoehoe lava flows. The lava tubes can vary from intact caves to partial or completely collapsed passages. The collapsed tubes, sinkholes, and jagged ʻaʻā surfaces are what make malpaís terrain so difficult to navigate and cultivate, thereby earning their name.

== Examples ==
El Malpaís National Monument is an example of this landform in New Mexico. Other examples are the Carrizozo Malpaís, Potrillo Malpaís and Jornada del Muerto Volcano lava plain, in the Jornada del Muerto Desert. The Malpaís de Güímar is an example in the Spanish Canary Islands.
