= Rincon Valley (New Mexico) =

Valley in New Mexico, United States

Rincon Valley is a valley through which the Rio Grande flows in New Mexico. Rincon Valley heads at 33°02′54″N 107°16′41″W at an elevation of 4,195 feet in a narrow gap between the Caballo Mountains on the east and bluffs on the west bank of the Rio Grande south of where Red Canyon meets the river, in Sierra County, New Mexico. Its mouth is at an elevation of 3,973 feet (1,211 meters) where it emerges from a narrow canyon between the Selden Hills on the northeast bank of the river and Robledo Mountains on the southwest bank, into the Mesilla Valley at Radium Springs in Doña Ana County, New Mexico.
