= Fort Conrad =

Coordinates: 33.7624°N 106.9085°W

Fort Conrad was a U.S. Army fort established in Socorro County, New Mexico Territory in 1851.

Fort Conrad was located near modern Tiffany, New Mexico. It was on the west side of the Rio Grande. Because of its location, it was later abandoned for Fort Craig in 1854.
