= Point of Rocks (Sierra County, New Mexico) =

Coordinates: 32°47′30″N 106°58′57″W

Point of Rocks, named by the Spanish Cerros del Perrillo (Hills of the Doggy), is a 5,115 foot / 1,559 meter summit and the name of a range of hills of which the summit is the highest. The summit and the hills are in the Jornada del Muerto plateau, mostly in Sierra County, New Mexico. The southernmost part of the hills are within Doña Ana County, New Mexico.

== History ==
Point of Rocks was a landmark along the El Camino Real de Tierra Adentro that passed to the west of these hills. Nearby to the south were two waterholes and a camping place, one of the few reliable watering places along the route known as the Jornada del Muerto. The place was called the Paraje del Perrillo (Place of the Little Dog). The paraje was named for a little dog that returned with muddy paws to the thirsty Onate expedition, prompting the search for and discovery of two small waterholes nearby that the Spanish fittingly named Los Charcos del Perrillo (The Puddles of the Doggy).

Long before the arrival of the Spanish, the water at Los Charcos del Perrillo was also a popular watering place for the local Apache. From the time that travelers came into the Jornada del Muerto they would be under scrutiny from mountains and hills along the route. Signal fires would be lit to alert others to this intrusion and to tell of their strength. Point of Rocks itself was a dangerous place, ideal for Apache warriors to conceal an attack or an ambush of passing travelers. The Paraje was located well away from the slopes of this place, and travelers were well advised to be wary and keep alert while near it.
