= Fra Cristobal Range =

Mountain range in New Mexico, United States

- Location within New Mexico

Highest point
- Elevation: 6,834 ft (2,083 m)
- Coordinates: 33°24′20″N 107°06′25″W

Dimensions
- Length: 17 mi (27 km) N-S
- Width: 6 mi (9.7 km)

Geography
- Country: United States
- State: New Mexico
- Regions: Jornada del Muerto and Rio Grande Valley
- County: Sierra and Socorro
- Settlement: Crocker
- Range coordinates: 33°19′24″N 107°05′30″W
- Borders on: Elephant Butte Reservoir, Rio Grande, Jornada del Muerto, Elephant Butte, Elephant Butte Dam, Truth or Consequences and Engle
- Topo map(s): Crocker, Engle, Lava USGS quads

The Fra Cristobal Range, (Fra Cristóbal Range) is a 17 mi (27 km) long, mountain range in central-north Sierra County, New Mexico. Its northern extremity north of Fra Cristobal Mountain extends into Socorro County. The range borders the eastern shore of Elephant Butte Reservoir on the Rio Grande, and lies on the western border of the Jornada del Muerto, a desert region that had been used since the 17th century by travelers from northern to southern New Mexico. The highest point in the range is 6,834 ft (2,083 m) in elevation.

== Description ==
The Fra Cristobal Range is an arid, moderate elevation, north–south trending mountain range, about 17 mi long and narrow, only about 7 mi at its widest. Crater Hill, 5,087 feet (1,551 m) lies west of the central ridgeline, and north of Black Bluffs, Red Cliff at the Reservoir.

The high peak in the northern end of the range, which gives the range its name, is Fra Cristobal Mountain, 5,932 feet (1,808 m), is at the north perimeter of the range. It is located at 33°28′12″N 107°05′55″W The mountain is said to have resembled the profile of a priest, Fray Cristóbal de Salazar, a cousin of Juan de Oñate, with the first colonizing expedition in 1598.

One of the few sources of water in the range is the Ojo del Muerto Spring at the southern edge of the Fra Cristobals. The spring is at the head of the Cañon del Muerto which joins McRae Canyon. In the 1860s and 1870s Fort McRae, situated in the canyon, protected settlements along the Rio Grande from Apache raids.

== Conservation ==
All the Fra Cristobal Range is within the Armendaris guest ranch owned by media magnate Ted Turner. The ranch extends for almost 50 miles (80 km) along the eastern side of the Rio Grande and consists of 362,855 acres (146,842 ha). The ranch headquarters and a guest house is located in the ghost town of Engle, New Mexico, which was a way stop on the El Camino Real de Tierra Adentro traversing the Jornada from north to south and connecting the Spanish colony of New Mexico with Mexico. A railroad and a highway pass through Engle.

The New Mexico Land Conservancy and the U.S. Department of Defense joined together in 2022 to establish a conservation easement of 315,000 acres (127,000 ha) on the Almendaris Ranch and the western part of the White Sands Missile Range. The Fra Cristobals have a herd of 230 desert bighorn sheep. Caves in the mountains harbor more than one million bats of several species. Among the wildife in the mountains are Oryx, an African antelope introduced into New Mexico in 1969. Other wildlife in the mountains include bison, mule deer, pronghorn, mountain lion, and javelina.
