= Cañon del Muerto (Sierra County, New Mexico) =

Cañon del Muerto is a canyon, in Sierra County, New Mexico.

The mouth of the Cañon del Muerto, was originally considered to flow into the Rio Grande. Its lower reach was later renamed McRae Canyon, with Cañon del Muerto having its mouth at its confluence with McRae Canyon at 33°11′21″N 107°07′32″W at an elevation of 4,460 feet (1,360 meters), below an unnamed arroyo flowing from the east, at an elevation of 4,573 feet (1,394 meters). Cañon del Muerto's source is at an elevation of 4,770 feet (1,450 meters) at 33°08′39″N 107°07′10″W.

== History ==
The Ojo del Muerto, an artesian spring, was located at 33°10′10″N 107°06′19″W, above the confluence of Cañon del Muerto with an unnamed arroyo that flows into McRae Canyon. It was one of the few reliable water sources along the route of the Jornada del Muerto, although stock and water carriers had to travel several leagues (5 or 6 miles) west from the trail to the spring and back. It was also the water source of the Apache in the region and very risky for travelers to obtain water there. Also the Cañon del Muerto was an easily traveled gap through the mountains between the Jornada del Muerto and the crossing of the Rio Grande there, used by the Apache and Navaho raiders of New Mexican settlements. For those reasons Fort McRae was built in McRae Canyon a mile and a half below the spring in 1863, to help protect travelers on the Jornada del Muerto and impede Apache raiders movement across the Jornada basin and the Rio Grande valley.
