= Jornada del Muerto =

Desert region in New Mexico, United States

Coordinates: 32°50′50″N 106°53′49″W

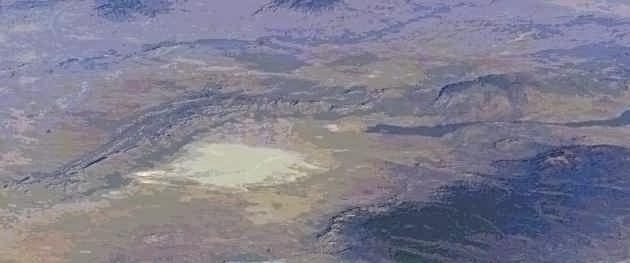
Jornada del Muerto is the upper third of the image, oriented with the top to the northwest. The Tularosa Basin is the lower half of the image, and the dark streak of lava north of White Sands is the Carrizozo Malpais. The Trinity atomic site is northwest of the Malpais. The forested Sacramento Mountains are to the right-east.

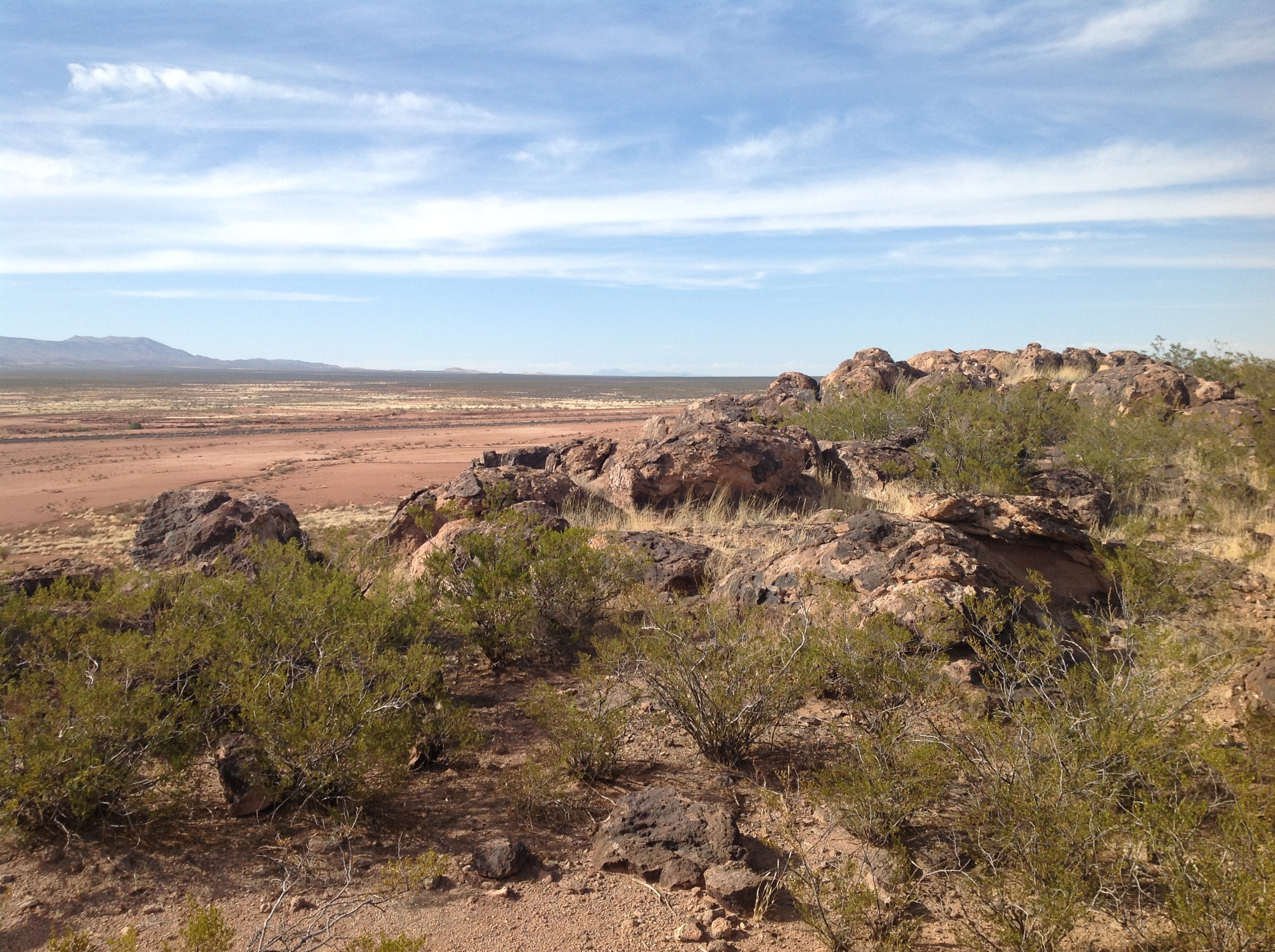
Rocky areas and lava flows punctuate the flat desert landscape.

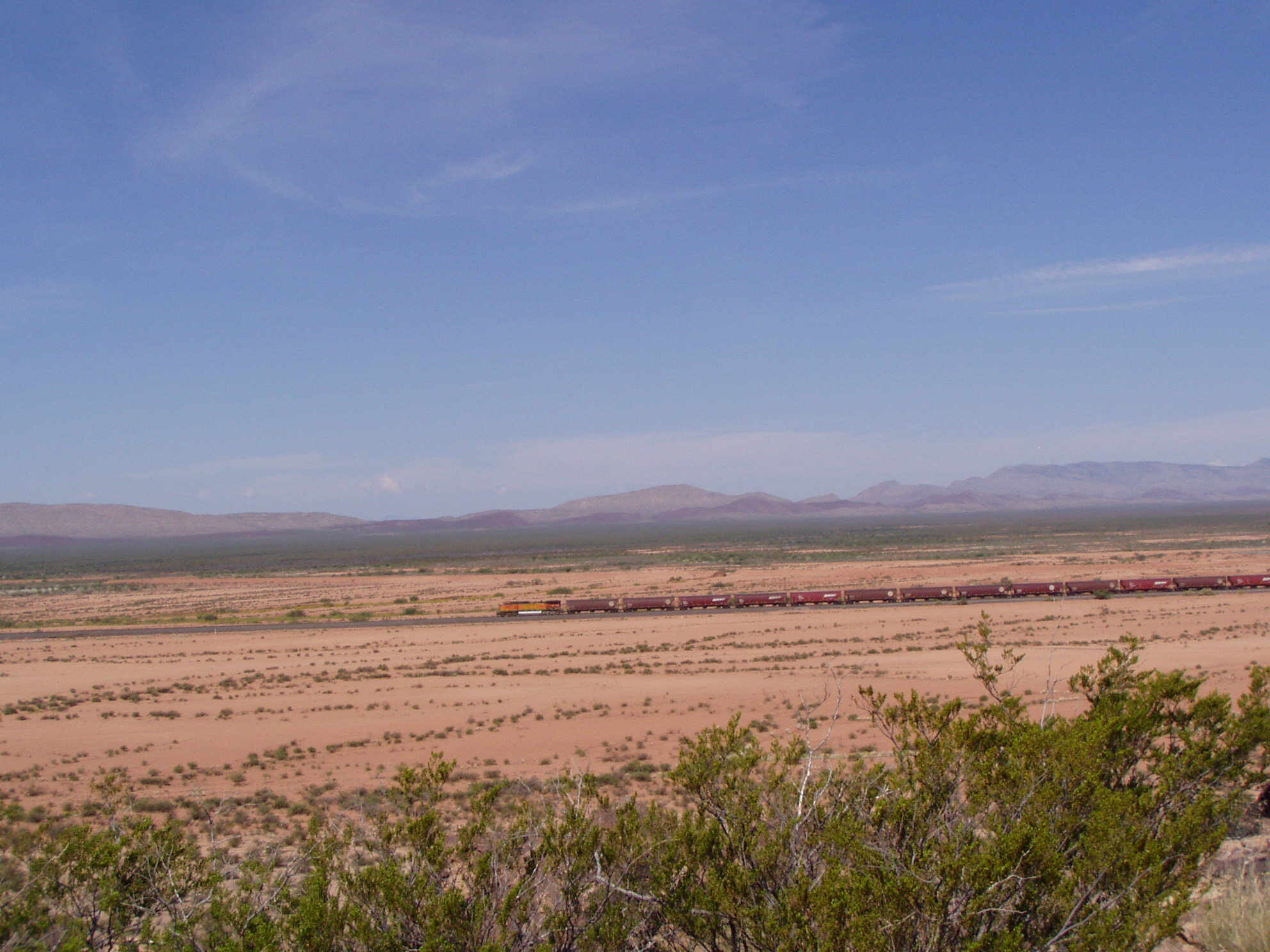
A railway has followed the course of the Jornada del Muerto trail since the 1880s.

Jornada del Muerto was the name given by the Spanish conquistadors to a desert basin in New Mexico and the almost waterless 90-mile (140 km) trail across it, beginning north of Las Cruces and ending south of Socorro. The name translates from Spanish as "Dead Man's Journey" or "Route of the Dead Man". The trail was part of the Camino Real de Tierra Adentro which led northward from central colonial New Spain, present-day Mexico, to the farthest reaches of the viceroyalty in northern Nuevo México Province (the area around the upper valley of the Rio Grande).

Spaceport America is located in the middle portion of the Jornada del Muerto at an elevation of 4,700 ft (1,400 m). The Trinity nuclear test site, the location of the first test of an atomic bomb in 1945 is in the northern portion of the Jornada.

== Natural history ==
The Jornada del Muerto basin is 20 miles (32 km) wide east to west and 160 miles (260 km) from north to south. Terrain is flat desert landforms and xeric vegetation. The historic trail crossing north to south across most of the Jornada is 90 miles (140 km) long. The desert basin runs between the Oscura Mountains and San Andres Mountains on the east, and the Fra Cristóbal Range and Caballo Mountains on the west. The western mountains block access to the Rio Grande. The only reliable water source near the middle of the journey was the Ojo del Muerto, which was 6 miles (9.7 km) from the main trail and difficult to reach by wagon train. The Laguna del Muerto or Engle Lake is near the trail, but is often dry. The Jornada is one of the northernmost parts of the Chihuahuan Desert ecoregion in the deserts and xeric shrublands biome. The average elevation is about 5,000 ft (1,500 m).

The Jornada del Muerto remains almost entirely uninhabited and undeveloped to the present day. Located just to the east of the southernmost region of the desert is the Jornada Basin LTER station, used for study of desert ecology, land management, plant physiology, and related topics.

=== Volcanism ===
The Jornada del Muerto volcano and malpaís are located at the northern end of the desert's region and basin. The Jornada del Muerto Volcano is a shield volcano that erupted about 760,000 years ago, reaching an elevation of 5,136 ft (1,565 m). The volcano's lava flow created the large Jornada del Muerto malpaís lava field, about 10 by 15 miles (16 by 24 km), about 150 sq mi (390 km^{2}) in size. The eruption produced a slow and viscous a'a lava which leaves a very rough surface, making travel across it difficult.

=== Climate ===
The climate of Aleman Ranch, near Spaceport America, is typical of the climate of the Jornada del Muerto. Under the Köppen Classification, the climate of Aleman Ranch is at the borderline between desert (BWk) and steppe (BSk) climates.

Climate data for Aleman Ranch (1948-2000); 4,520 feet (1,380 m) above sea level; 33.00 N, 107.00 W.
Month	Jan	Feb	Mar	Apr	May	Jun	Jul	Aug	Sep	Oct	Nov	Dec	Year
Mean daily maximum °F (°C)	54.7 (12.6)	60.3 (15.7)	67.2 (19.6)	75.6 (24.2)	84.0 (28.9)	93.0 (33.9)	93.3 (34.1)	90.7 (32.6)	85.3 (29.6)	75.8 (24.3)	63.5 (17.5)	54.4 (12.4)	74.8 (23.8)
Daily mean °F (°C)	39.3 (4.1)	43.7 (6.5)	49.6 (9.8)	57.2 (14.0)	65.6 (18.7)	74.8 (23.8)	78.0 (25.6)	76.5 (24.7)	69.6 (20.9)	59.1 (15.1)	47.5 (8.6)	39.7 (4.3)	58.3 (14.6)
Mean daily minimum °F (°C)	24.0 (−4.4)	27.1 (−2.7)	31.9 (−0.1)	38.7 (3.7)	47.1 (8.4)	56.6 (13.7)	62.7 (17.1)	61.3 (16.3)	53.9 (12.2)	42.3 (5.7)	31.4 (−0.3)	24.9 (−3.9)	41.8 (5.4)
Average precipitation inches (mm)	0.43 (11)	0.33 (8.4)	0.30 (7.6)	0.20 (5.1)	0.39 (9.9)	0.70 (18)	2.02 (51)	2.02 (51)	1.43 (36)	0.89 (23)	0.51 (13)	0.75 (19)	9.97 (253)
Average snowfall inches (cm)	8.9 (23)	9.7 (25)	3.8 (9.7)	2.5 (6.4)	—	—	—	—	—	—	1.8 (4.6)	10.4 (26)	37.1 (94)
Source: Western Regional Climate Center

== Cultural history ==
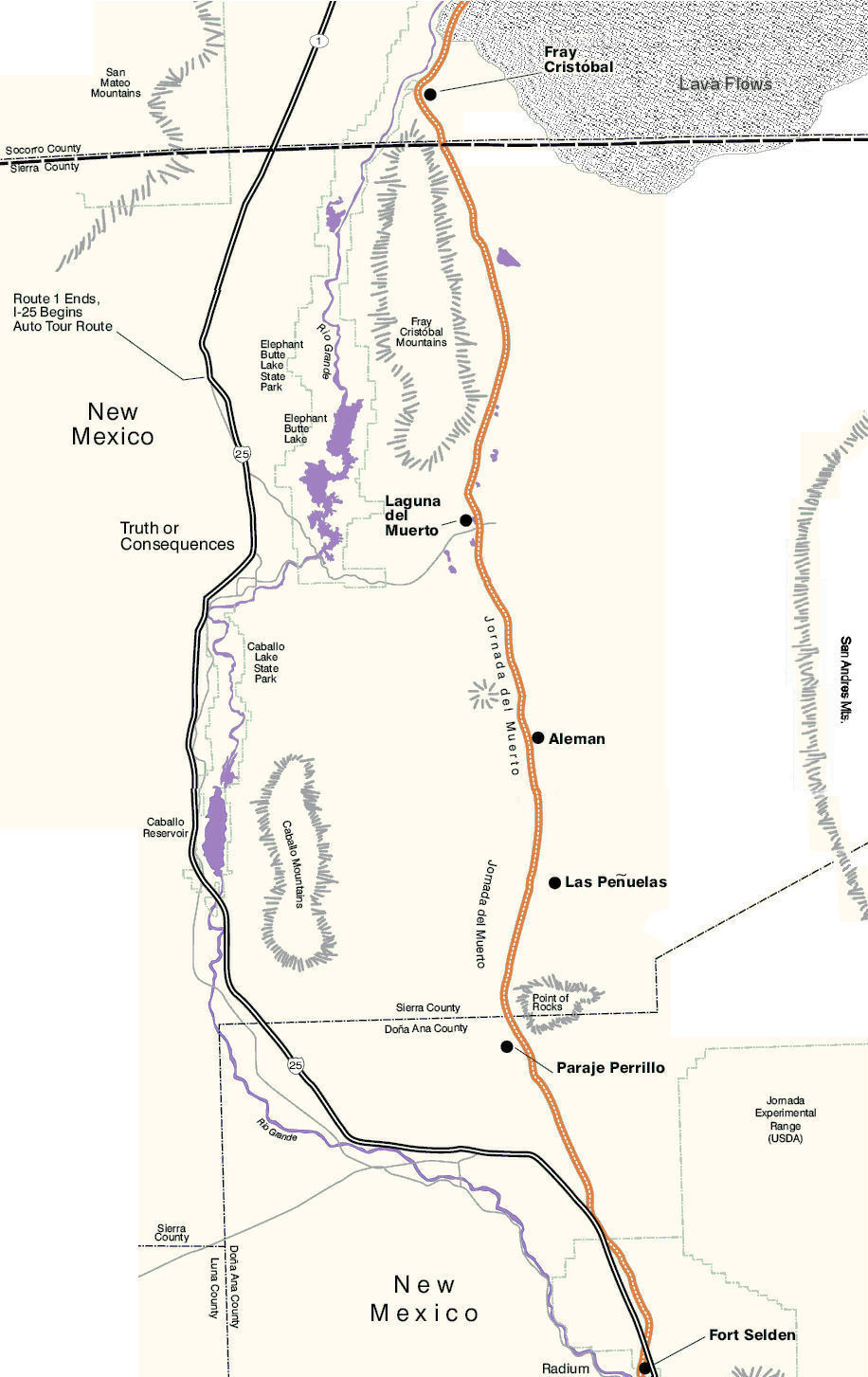
The route of Jornada del Muerto trail. Click on Map to View

Abundant evidence of Paleo-Indian occupation has been found at the Mockingbird Gap site in the northern Jornada. The projectile points and other remains found by archaeologists are examples of the Clovis culture (c. 9000 BCE) and Folsom culture (c. 8000 BCE). Precipitation in the Jornada began to decline about 9000 BCE, resulting in less evidence of the presence of Paleo-Indian cultures.

The Jornada became well-known to the Spanish in 1598 during the colonizing mission of Juan de Oñate. Oñate, as would later travelers, chose to cross the Jornada rather than follow the Rio Grande because the route was shorter and easier to traverse with the ox-drawn carts and livestock of the Spanish colonists. It took five days of little water for Oñate to cross the Jornada. The Jornada del Muerto was named when the bones of a German (alemán in Spanish) were found in 1670 along the route. Aleman became the name of a watering and populated place along the route across the Jornada.

After passing the "Jornada del Muerto" the earliest Spanish traveling north encountered the walled villages of the Pueblo dwellers, who had a well-developed agriculture and a peaceable tradition. After the first crossing the Jornada del Muerto in 1598 they named one of the first pueblos they came to Socorro (Spanish for 'help' or 'assistance').

In 1680, during the Pueblo Revolt, 2,000 Spanish settlers, including Indians from the Isleta and Socorro Pueblos, were forced to retreat southward, across the Jornada del Muerto, The survivors resettled on the Rio Grande around and south of El Paso del Norte, 'the Pass to the North', which is now separated between the Mexican city of Ciudad Juárez, Chihuahua, and the U.S. city of El Paso, Texas. In 1692, Diego de Vargas led a new group of settlers north across the Jornada del Muerto to resettle northern New Mexico.

On horseback the Jornada could be traversed in as little as two days, as described by Bishop Tamarón traveling north on his visitation to New Mexico in 1760. Leaving the Paraje de Robledo, traveling five leagues:

On this day, the twelfth of the month and the sixth of the journey, we came to the Jornada del Muerto. To prepare for it, a detour is made to seek the river at a place called San Diego. The night is spent there. Everything necessary is made ready. It is about half a league from the river. Barrels are brought for the purpose. These are filled with water for the people. On the morning of the thirteenth the horses were taken to the river to drink. Somewhat later all the food for the journey was prepared, and at half past seven we left that post with considerable speed, stopping only to change horses. During this interval we ate what there was, and we traveled in this fashion until eight-thirty at night, when we halted opposite the Sierra of Fray Cristobal.

On the fourteenth day of May, the eighth day of our journey, we made an early start. We reached the river at eleven‑thirty. The livestock were so thirsty that they ran to reach the water. After this fashion were the thirty leagues of this difficult stage traveled.

Homesteaders in the 1860s to 1920s tried to ranch in the Jornada del Muerto, digging wells for the cattle. The first well was at Aleman, dug by Lt. John Martin, and it appears to be the last of the homesteads to be abandoned at the end of the 20th century.

=== Trail ===
The Jornada del Muerto trail was part of the Camino Real which reached from Mexico City to the Spanish colonies in New Mexico. The Jornada trail departed from the Rio Grande from the Paraje de Robledo, later the site of Fort Selden, just north of Las Cruces, New Mexico. It continued northward through a gap, between the Selden Hills on the west and Doña Ana Mountains to the east, on to the plain of the Jornada. The last opportunity for filling water barrels and watering stock before continuing farther north was from the Paraje de San Diego overlooking the Rio Grande five leagues beyond Robledo and one-half league from the river.

The next intermittent water was at Paraje del Perrillo near where the trail passes Point of Rocks which is the southernmost point of the closed Jornada basin. The trail heads basically north through mesquite scrub land to another small intermittent watering place, La Cruz de Alemán, named for a fugitive German merchant who died of thirst there in the 1670s, at a time when it had no water. At that site there are now buildings of the Bar Cross Ranch built on the site of the original settlement in the Jornada del Muerto, the Aleman Ranch, established in 1867.

Further north the trail crosses a number of small ephemeral lake beds the Jornada Lakes, on the way to Engle Lake then known as the Laguna del Muerto. When water was not found in the Laguna del Muerto it could be found to the west at the Ojo del Muerto, a spring in Cañon del Muerto in the southern Fra Cristobal Range nearby to the southeast of the later site of Fort McRae that operated from 1863 to 1876.

At the upper end of the basin the trail was squeezed into the Lava Gate between the Fra Cristóbal Range and the Jornada del Muerto Volcano lava fields. The waterless portion of the trail ends at Paraje de Fray Cristóbal on the Rio Grande, but the trail continued north along the river for five leagues, across a small portion of the Jornada del Muerto Volcano lava fields, which originally reached across the Rio Grande. This large lava field has a very rough surface, making travel across it very difficult. This portion of the trail reached the paraje del Contadero along the Rio Grande south of the Mesa del Contadero. It then passed one of two ways around the Mesa, along the river or over the hills to its east, to a paraje and fords of the Rio Grande known as Val Verde from the 1780s. An extremely large Spanish rancho was later established and a large hacienda was built at the crossing at Val Verde in the early 1820s. However it was abandoned soon after under the pressure of Apache raids and attacks by 1826.

In 1846, Major Philip St. George Cooke and the Mormon Battalion established a wagon road south of San Antonio on an old trail on the west bank of the Rio Grande as far as a few miles above the vicinity of modern Hatch, New Mexico, before turning west to make the route known as Cooke's Wagon Road. Soon after the war ended and the California Gold Rush began, thousands of people were following Cooke's road west to California down the west side of the Rio Grande.

With the American acquisition of New Mexico Territory as a consequence of the Mexican American War, protection of settlements and travel by the U. S. Army on the lower Rio Grande below San Antonio began. Fort Conrad was established in 1851 across the river and a little north of the ford of Valverde, and it was replaced in 1854 by Fort Craig miles below the ford and the Mesa, also on the west bank. Fort Thorn was built on the west bank of the Rio Grande in 1853. It was located where a trail from the Jornada road, established by Forty-niners, crossed the Rio Grande to the west bank at San Diego Crossing to meet Cooke's road three miles above Fort Thorn. These offered some protection on the Jornada road and also on the Fort Craig - Fort Thorn Wagon Road down the west side of the Rio Grande to Fort Thorn. This road was also the route of supply for the forts. This Army protection, and the supply columns use of the road led to native New Mexican settlements on the lower Rio Grande, at Santa Barbara, near Fort Thorn in 1853 and San Ygnacio de Alamosa 35 miles south of Fort Craig in 1859.

The Rio Grande, Mexico and Pacific Railroad (a subsidiary of the Atchison, Topeka and Santa Fe) in 1880 constructed a railroad southward through the Jornada, which became part of the second U.S. transcontinental railroad in March 1881. Now owned by BNSF, it connects Belen with El Paso, Texas as its El Paso Subdivision.

=== Atomic test ===
On July 16, 1945 the first detonation of an atomic weapon occurred at the Trinity nuclear test site, in the northernmost part of the Jornada del Muerto Basin. Less than a month after Trinity, nuclear bomb "Little Boy" was detonated over Hiroshima, Japan.

== In popular culture ==
- "Jornada del Muerto" is the title of a song that appears on Linkin Park's concept album A Thousand Suns, which deals with nuclear warfare.
- "Jornada del Muerto #20" is the title of a song that appears on Centro-matic's 2008 double album Dual Hawks.
- "Jornada del Muerto" is the title of a song that appears on Nadja's album Excision.
- Events described in the novel Mount Dragon by Douglas Preston and Lincoln Child take place in a remote biological testing facility located in the Jornada del Muerto.
- A portion of the novel Flashman and the Redskins by George MacDonald Fraser takes place in the Jornada del Muerto.
- A portion of the novel Dead Man's Walk by Larry McMurtry takes place in the Jornada del Muerto, and the title refers to what some of the characters called the trek through it.
- The 1951 film Only the Valiant, starring Gregory Peck, is set in the region.
- "Leaving El Paso" is the title of a song by Tom Russell which mentions the Spanish trek out of Rio Grande Valley.

== See also ==
- Bosque
- Carrizozo Malpais
- Mesquite Bosque
- Rio Grande Trail
- Spaceport America
