= Cañada Alamosa =

Cañada Alamosa may refer to one of several places names in the US state of New Mexico:

== Geography ==
- Cañada Alamosa, former name of Monticello Canyon, a valley in Sierra County and Socorro County, New Mexico
  - The box canyon, part of Monticello Canyon, midway along the course of Alamosa Creek, known today as Monticello Box
- Cañada Alamosa, a valley and a tributary stream of Rio Vallecitos in Rio Arriba County, New Mexico

== Populated places ==
- Cañada Alamosa (Apache land), ancestral lands of the Warm Springs Apache
- Cañada Alamosa, or Canada Alamosa, the original name of Monticello, New Mexico
- San Ygnacio de la Alamosa, New Mexico, mistakenly referred to as Cañada Alamosa during the American Civil War

== Events ==
- Battle of Canada Alamosa (1861), skirmish of the American Civil War
