= San Ygnacio de la Alamosa, New Mexico =

Ghost town in New Mexico

Coordinates: 33°18′06″N 107°10′50″W

San Ygnacio de la Alamosa, also known as Alamosa, is now a ghost town, in Sierra County, New Mexico, United States. San Ygnacio de la Alamosa was founded in 1859 as a native New Mexican colonizing settlement from San Antonio. The site of the new colony was along the west bank of the Rio Grande, 35 miles south of Fort Craig, on the south bank of Alamosa Creek nearby its mouth and confluence with the Rio Grande, in what was then southern Socorro County.

== History ==
=== Establishment ===
San Ygnacio de la Alamosa was the first native New Mexican colony established south of San Antonio along the west bank of the Rio Grande and north of Santa Barbara and Fort Thorn (established in 1853) since the Pueblo Revolt. The east bank had an attempt at colonization in 1819-1826 when there was an attempt to establish a hacienda of the Armendáriz Grant, at Valverde that failed due to Apache raids. However by 1860, under the protection of Fort Conrad and then Fort Craig, Valverde had become a small settlement and Paraje had been established south of Valverde in 1857. Two years later the town of San Ygnacio de la Alamosa was settled.

The prime mover of establishing Alamosa was Estanislado Montoya a farmer and merchant, age 40, from San Antonio, recorded in the 1860 Census of San Ygnacio de la Alamosa with a personal estate of $10,000 and real estate of $2,000. He organized this colony but by December 1864 had returned to San Antonio to continue acquiring and selling real estate there and in Socorro and San Pedro in the following two decades.

The town would be protected by Fort Craig, 35 miles north of the new town along the Fort Craig - Fort Thorn Wagon Road. That road ran through the town, and down along the west bank of the Rio Grande to Fort Thorn and to roads south into Texas and west toward California. The road was following the wagon road route established by Cooke's Mormon Battalion in 1846. They had been following an old route occasionally followed by early Spanish and later Mexican travelers. It was soon after the end of the Mexican American War that the same wagon road was followed by many others intent on joining the California Gold Rush. By 1857 it was a well beaten route used by supply trains and troops for the forts.

=== The Settlement ===
The 1860 Census showed Alamosa with a population of 321 persons, 169 males and 152 females living as 71 families in 73 dwellings. All had Hispanic names, and all had been born in New Mexico. 43 of the family heads identified themselves as laborers, 17 identified themselves as farmers, one as a blacksmith, one as a carpenter and one as a musician, the remainder gave no occupation. The census taker reported June 25, 1860, that the settlement was so new that no crops had yet been harvested.

Irrigation and farms were first established on the west bank of the Rio Grande as these farmers were accustomed to do in the broader river valley upstream of Mesa del Contadero where they had come from. In July 1862 a great flood, in this narrower valley with a faster moving river, washed most of these farms and irrigation ditches away. The farms in the Cañada Alamosa were unaffected. Some citizens returned to farm along the river but some moved upstream in 1863 to establish farms in the cañada just below the place where Alamosa Creek emerged from the narrow canyon it made through the mountains.

=== Conflicts ===
San Ygnacio de la Alamosa was established on land occupied by the Warm Springs or Tchihende (Mimbreño) Apache. These Apache lands extended east and west of the Rio Grande, south of the Mesa del Contadero and north of Dona Ana. They included the Jornada del Muerto desert and the various mountain ranges within it, as well as west of the Rio Grande. It had been theirs before the arrival of the Spanish in the area and held by them for centuries with no successful attempt to settle them by the Spanish or later by the Mexicans.

It was after the American occupation and acquisition of Santa Fe de Nuevo México that relatively good relations were established with these people by the Indian Agent Dr. Michael Steck, and their hostilities continued to be directed against Mexico their old enemy. As a result the Americans were able to establish Fort Craig and Fort Thorn on the edges of their lands and connect them with a military road on the west bank of the Rio Grande. The first settlement in centuries was then established on that road at the mouth of Alamosa Creek. This colony was only a days ride up Alamosa Creek and Monticello Canyon, originally known in Spanish as the Cañada Alamosa (Glen of the Cottonwoods), to the warm springs at the center of the Tchihende territory. Despite this provocation and others the Apache stayed at peace with the Americans and the New Mexican colony until after the February 1861 Bascom Affair triggered the Apache Wars. This did not stop the Apache from taking livestock. As early as June 8–9, 1860, settlers at San Ygnacio de la Alamosa wrote a certification of the theft of 12 Oxen, 2 mules, 4 burros by Apache.

==== Navajo attacks ====
In April 1860, Navajo raiders with herds of thousands of sheep stolen north of Fort Craig, on the east side of the Rio Grande, fleeing pursuit by detachments of U. S. Army Mounted Rifles detachments, attempted crossings of the Rio Grande at Canyon del Muerto (now known as McRae Canyon), near San Ygnacio de la Alamosa. The pursuit of the Army included the involvement of the towns local militia that was stationed on the west bank of the Rio Grande, blocking the Navajo from crossing the river ford at the mouth of Canyon del Muerto. The pursuing Army force closed in behind the raiders, forcing them to abandon their stolen herd of sheep and fight their way out of the trap with losses. This location was later to be the site of Fort McRae.

==== Civil War, September 24–25, 1861 ====
The Battle of Canada Alamosa was fought in San Ygnacio de la Alamosa.

=== Apache War ===
Following the Bascom Affair the Chiricahua Apache under Cochise seeking revenge for the killing of his relatives by the U. S. Army, allied with the Mimbreños who were fighting the intrusion of American miners in their territory at Pinos Altos. They wanted to drive the Americans out of their lands. The Apache soon fell on the Butterfield Overland Mail stagecoach stations and coaches west of the Rio Grande to the San Pedro River, destroying several of them and killing employees. The company closed the route and moved its remaining stock and employees to a new route to the north. Other travel on the southern route dried up under the threat of Apache attack.

Many settled locations in the southern half of New Mexico Territory were abandoned for the same reason. Alamosa was not one of them, despite being subject to raids, the settlers worked carrying firearms with them when working in the fields. Also first Fort Craig and later from 1863 Fort McRae, supplied weapons to some of the militia and provided detachments of soldiers to help them defend Alamosa. The later settlement of Canada Alamosa founded by citizens of Alamosa between 1863 and 1866 were also similarly aided by the Army. Many of the remaining citizens of Alamosa would move there after 1867.

=== Decline, abandonment and legacy ===
With acequias and fields damaged by flooding of the Rio Grande in July and August 1862, in 1863 some of the population of Alamosa moved miles up Alamosa Creek to a better farming region to establish farms that became the town of Cañada Alamosa, now Monticello. After flooding destroyed Alamosa in 1867, many of its residents moved up the valley to farm near and live in the new town, called Canada Alamosa, that had been organized sometime between 1864 and 1866.

Others moved across the river and downstream a couple of miles, to start a new town of New Alamosa that became known as Alamocita, to farm on the opposite side of the river. Alamocita also was six miles north of Fort McRae, established in April 1863 to protect these new settlements along the Rio Grande from the Apache, along with the traffic along the river road and the old road to the east in the Jornada del Muerto.

That same year, a number of the citizens of Canada Alamosa, moved down the Rio Grande to where Palomas Creek had its confluence with the river. Located twenty miles south of Fort McRae, it was less exposed to the attacks of the Apache, and there they established the settlement first called Plaza del Rio Palomas, later more commonly called Las Palomas.

In 1871, Cuchillo, then called Cuchillo Negro, was founded mostly by citizens of Alamocita who had been farming along Cuchillo Negro Creek from about 1868.

Fort McRae and its garrison would provide its protection and economic benefits to citizens of the towns over the years of its operation until it was closed on October 30, 1876.

== Present status ==
The site of San Ygnacio de la Alamosa today lies within the boundaries of Sierra County. It is now underneath decades of deposits of silt accumulated in Elephant Butte Reservoir that had submerged the site of the settlement by as much as 100 feet of water since the 1920s. The site is currently exposed by the low level of the reservoir.

== See also ==
- List of ghost towns in New Mexico
