= Fort McRae =

Coordinates: 33°11′28″N 107°08′38″W

- U.S. National Register of Historic Places
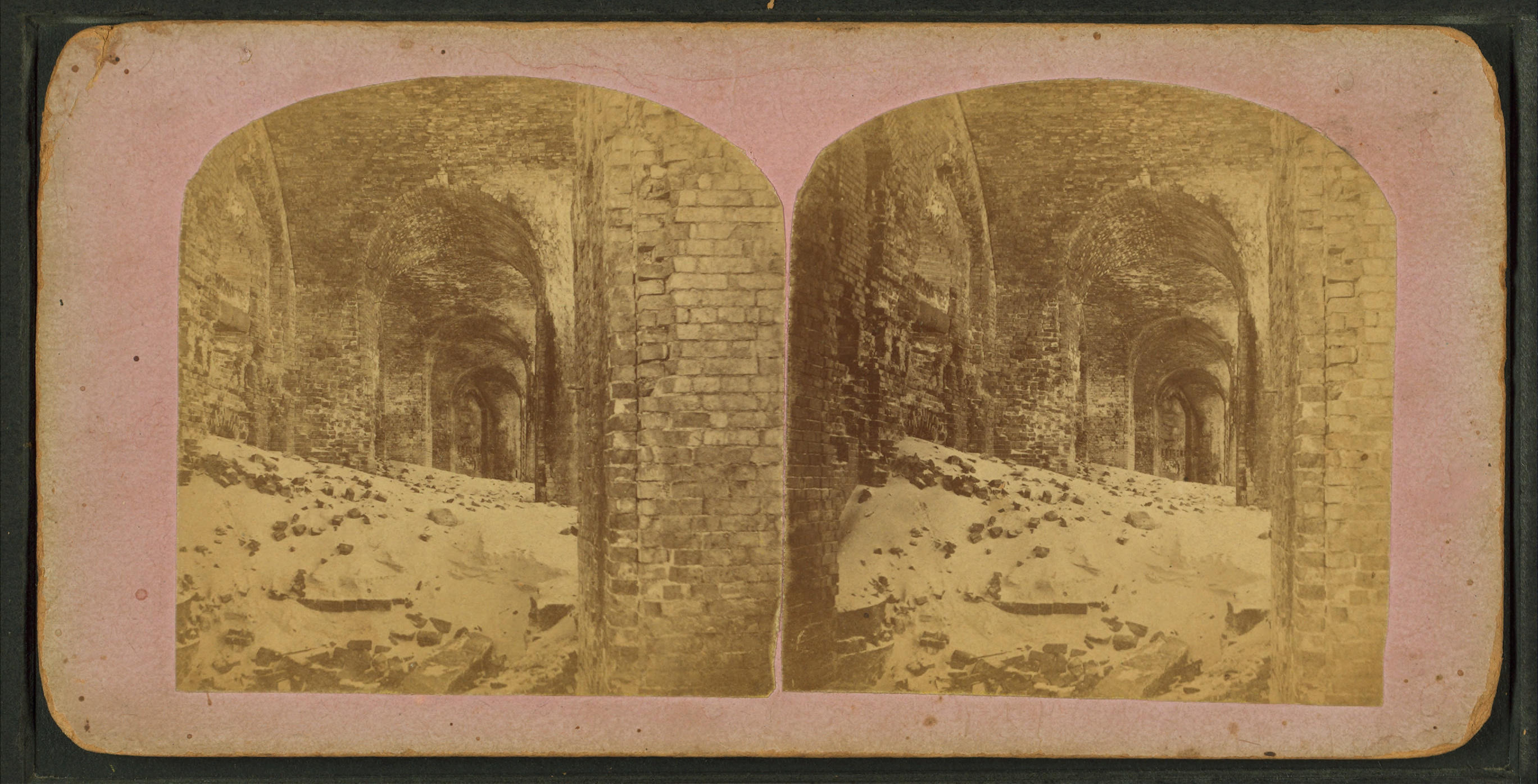
- Stereoscopic view of the ruins

- Location within New Mexico
- Nearest city: Elephant Butte, New Mexico
- Area: 21.6 acres (8.7 ha)
- Built: 1866
- Built by: U.S. Army
- NRHP reference No.: 05000258
- Added to NRHP: April 7, 2005

Fort McRae was a Union Army post, established in 1863, then a U.S. Army post from 1866 and closed in 1876, in what is now Sierra County, New Mexico. The post was named for Alexander McRae (1829–1862) a slain hero of the 1862 Battle of Valverde.

The site of Fort McRae is located on the east bank of the Elephant Butte Reservoir in the general area of Elephant Butte, New Mexico within McRae Canyon. A 21.6 acres (8.7 ha) area at the site was listed on the National Register of Historic Places in 2005. In National Park Service sources its precise location was Address restricted.

== History ==
=== Union Army ===
Fort McRae was first established by California Volunteers of the Union Army during the American Civil War on April 3, 1863. It was located east of the Rio Grande on the south side of Canyon del Muerto, (now known as McRae Canyon), at an elevation of 4,423 feet (1,348 meters) in the southern Fra Cristobal Range, 3 miles northeast of Elephant Butte, in Sierra County, New Mexico. It was located nearby to the west of the Ojo del Muerto, a spring in the Canyon del Muerto, one of the few reliable water sources along the route of the Jornada del Muerto.

Fort McRae was established to protect the area of new settlements and road on the west bank of the Rio Grande Valley and in the road across the Jornada del Muerto from Navaho and Apache raiders. It also blocked the Apache and Navajo from using the Canyon del Muerto gap through the Fra Cristobal Range and also from using the Ojo del Muerto spring. The post was originally founded by California Volunteers of the Union Army in 1863 to the protect settlements of Alamosa and Canada Alamosa, and the travelers on the Fort Craig - Fort Thorn Wagon Road and Jornada del Muerto from Apache raids. Later settlements of Alamocita, Plaza del Rio Palomas, in 1867 and Cuchillo Negro in 1871, were added to the Fort's protection duties.

The Volunteers during their time at Ft. McRae built a cenotaph with names of soldiers in the post cemetery, that was enclosed within a stone wall. The Volunteers manned it until they were relieved by soldiers of the regular U.S. Army during the aftermath of the American Civil War in 1866.

=== U. S. Army ===
Fort McRae was the only outpost within a radius of 30 miles (48 km), except for the other U.S. Army forts; Fort Craig which was 23 miles (37 km) away to the north and Fort Selden which was 60 miles away to the south. In 1867, Alamocita, a small New Mexican town was established on the east bank about six miles up the Rio Grande from the fort, some from Alamosa, three miles away on the west bank that had been destroyed by the flooding earlier that same year. That year too, the Plaza del Rio Palomas, later more commonly called Las Palomas, was founded twenty miles down river from the fort on the west bank, at the confluence of Palomas Creek with the Rio Grande. The population thought it easier to defend from Apache attacks, and easier to reinforce from Fort McRae, than their former home in Alamosa. Between 1868 and 1871, Cuchillo Negro was settled by pioneering New Mexican farmers from Alamosita. After a peace was made Fort McRae provided the garrison at the Apache reservation at Ojo Caliente on the upper Cañada Alamosa. In October 1876, the fort was decommissioned and abandoned, the garrison withdrawn and their responsibilities taken over by Fort Craig.

== The Site Today ==
The site today, partially submerged at times of high water in the reservoir, in recent years has been exposed by the lower water. It has some foundations and other traces of the fort on the south side of McRae Canyon.
