= Las Palomas, New Mexico =

- Census-designated place
- Location within New Mexico
- Coordinates: 33°03′32″N 107°17′54″W
- Country: United States
- State: New Mexico
- County: Sierra

Area
  - Total: 1.60 sq mi (4.15 km^{2})
  - Land: 1.60 sq mi (4.15 km^{2})
  - Water: 0 sq mi (0.00 km^{2})
- Elevation: 4,262 ft (1,299 m)

Population (2020)
  - Total: 196
  - Density: 122.3/sq mi (47.21/km^{2})
- Time zone: UTC−7 (Mountain (MST))
  - Summer (DST): UTC−6 (MDT)
- Area code: 575
- GNIS feature ID: 2584135

Las Palomas is a census-designated place in Sierra County, New Mexico, United States. As of the 2020 census, Las Palomas had a population of 196. The community is located near Exit 71 of Interstate 25; New Mexico State Road 187 also passes through the community.

== History ==
Las Palomas was one of the offspring settlements of San Ygnacio de la Alamosa, also known as Alamosa, the original native New Mexican settlement, in what became Sierra County, in 1859. After flooding destroyed Alamosa in 1867, many of its residents moved up the Alamosa Creek valley to farm near and live in the new town, called Canada Alamosa. That town had been organized by some earlier residents of Alamosa sometime between 1864 and 1866.

Others moved across the river to the east bank and downstream a couple of miles to farm on the opposite side of the river and to start a new town, first called New Alamosa, but that soon became known as Alamocita. Alamocita was six miles north of Fort McRae which was established in April 1863 to protect these new settlements along the Rio Grande Valley from the Apache, along with the traffic along the river and the old road to the east in the Jornada del Muerto.

Also in 1867, a number of the citizens of Canada Alamosa, moved down the Rio Grande to where Palomas Creek had its confluence with the river. There twenty miles south of Fort McRae, it was less exposed to the attacks of the Apache, and easier to reinforce from the fort. There they established the farming settlement first called Plaza del Rio Palomas, later more commonly called Las Palomas. Fort McRae and its garrison would provide its protection and economic benefits to citizens of the towns over the years of its operation until it was closed on October 30, 1876. Las Palomas is the only one of the early New Mexican settlements built along the Rio Grande in Sierra County to survive to the present day despite the river flooding and the construction of reservoirs.

== Geography ==
According to the U.S. Census Bureau, the community has an area of 1.599 square miles (4.14 km^{2}), all land.

== Demographics ==
Historical population
Census	Pop.	Note	%±
2020	196		—
U.S. Decennial Census

== Education ==
Truth or Consequences Municipal Schools is the school district for the entire county. Truth or Consequences Middle School and Hot Springs High School, both in Truth or Consequences, are the district's secondary schools.
