= Alamocita, New Mexico =

Former settlement in New Mexico

Coordinates: 33°18′06″N 107°10′50″W

Alamocita, initially called New Alamosa, was a later 19th century native New Mexican frontier settlement along the east bank of the Rio Grande and is now a ghost town in Sierra County, New Mexico, United States.

== History ==
Alamocita was settled by some of the people from nearby San Ygnacio de la Alamosa, the earlier New Mexican settlement founded nearby in 1859. Alamosa, as it was commonly known, was three miles up river from the future site of Alamocita, on the west bank of the Rio Grande, at its confluence with Alamosa Creek, (then named Arroyo or Rio Alamosa). This move by some of the population followed the 1867 destruction of the acequias and fields along the flooding creek and river. Historically, it was a Spanish settlement, most of its residents were farmers.

After flooding destroyed Alamosa in 1867, many of its residents moved up the valley to farm near and live in the new town, called Canada Alamosa, that had been organized sometime between 1864 and 1866. Others moved across the river and downstream a couple of miles to start a new town of New Alamosa that became known as Alamocita to farm on the opposite side of the river. Alamocita also was six miles north of Fort McRae, established in April 1863 to protect these new settlements along the Rio Grande from the Apache, along with the traffic along the river and the old road to the east in the Jornada del Muerto. That same year, a number of the citizens of Canada Alamosa and new settlers, moved down the Rio Grande to where Palomas Creek had its confluence with the river. Twenty miles south of Fort McRae, it was less exposed to the attacks of the Apache, and there they established the settlement at first called Plaza del Rio Palomas. Fort McRae and its garrison would provide its protection, arms and economic benefits to citizens of the towns over the years of its operation until it was closed on October 30, 1876.

By 1868, residents of Alamocita were growing crops on Cuchillo Negro Creek irrigated with the waters of the creek in the vicinity of modern Cuchillo. Some would go on to begin the new settlement of Cuchillo Negro there in 1871. The 1870 census listed the population at 40 persons.

The town was submerged in the early 1900s when the Elephant Butte Dam was constructed on the Rio Grande.

== Decline and Demise ==
Alamocita ceased to be a town in 1880, following a flood that changed the course of the Rio Grande, washing away or leaving most of the irrigatable lands on the west bank of the river. Most of the population moved away to other villages in the Rio Grande Valley. By 1885 the Territorial Census found only two ranches remained there, one owned by José Perfecto Garcia and the other by Pedro Montoya that had been there in the 1870 Census.

The end of Alamocita came when 24 persons, of the four families that lived there in houses among the remaining fields at the time of the 1910 Census, sold their land to the Department of Reclamation. Three of the families had the surname of Garcia. Some of these families may have lingered on there until the waters of the Elephant Butte Reservoir began to rise.

== See also ==
- List of ghost towns in New Mexico
