= Mink's Independent Cavalry Company =

Mink's Independent Cavalry Company, was an Independent Cavalry Company of the Union Army, raised by the New Mexico Territory during the American Civil War.

Mink's Independent Cavalry Company was raised by Captain John H. Mink at Peñasco and Taos, then marched to, and organized by Captain Mink at Santa Fe, New Mexico, July 20, 1861. Its first duty was at Fort Craig, New Mexico Territory, till October, opposing the Confederate forces from Texas that were operating in the southern part of the territory, known as Confederate Arizona. They were in two engagements. The first was at the Skirmish at Canada Alamosa, on September 25, 1861. The second at Alamosa near Fort Craig on October 4, 1861. They were shortly mustered out on October 29, 1861.

== Officers ==
- Captain: John Henry Mink, to September 25, 1861;
- First Lieutenant: Felipe Sánchez
- Second Lieutenant: Matías Medina, to September 25, 1861

== See also ==
- Independent Companies, New Mexico Volunteer Cavalry
- List of New Mexico Territory Civil War units
