= Cañada Viviancito =

Cañada Viviancito, is a tributary arroyo of Alamosa Creek, and a side cañada in Monticello Canyon, in Sierra County, New Mexico. Its mouth is at its confluence with the creek at an elevation of 5,551 feet (1,692 meters) within Monticello Canyon. The source of the arroyo is at an elevation of 6,000 feet (1,800 meters), while the head of the cañada is at an elevation of 6,060 feet (1,850 meters) at 33°28′06″N 107°29′05″W.
