= Battle of Canada Alamosa =

Part of the American Civil War in New Mexico Territory (1861)

Coordinates: 33.302°N 107.181°W

- Part of the Trans-Mississippi Theater of the American Civil War
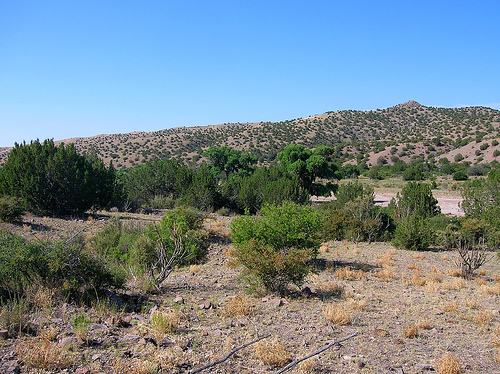
- The Canada Alamosa battlefield
Date	September 24–25, 1861
Location	San Ygnacio de la Alamosa, New Mexico Territory (USA), Arizona Territory (CSA); Modern Day: Sierra County, New Mexico
Result	Confederate victory, successful Union delaying action.

Belligerents
Confederate States	United States

Commanders and leaders
Bethel Coopwood	John H. Minks

Strength
112 cavalry	~100 cavalry

Casualties and losses
2 killed 7 wounded	4 killed 6 wounded 23 captured

The Battle of Canada Alamosa as it was known to the Union Army, or Alamosa as it was known to the Confederates, was a skirmish of the American Civil War on the late evening of September 24 and the morning of September 25, 1861. It was one of several small battles that occurred in Confederate Arizona near the border with Union held New Mexico Territory, this one being the largest.

== Background ==
This battle occurred about thirty five miles south of Fort Craig, at the village of San Ygnacio de la Alamosa, familiarly known as Alamosa, near the confluence of Alamosa Creek with the Rio Grande. Alamosa was wrongly identified in Union Army reports as Canada Alamosa, the name later given to what is now present-day Monticello, New Mexico). Bethel Coopwood, the Confederate commander, correctly identified it as Alamosa in his report of September 29, 1861.

Lieutenant Colonel John R. Baylor, who had led the 2nd Texas Mounted Rifles into New Mexico Territory one month earlier, defeated the Union garrison of Fort Fillmore at the First Battle of Mesilla, proclaimed the area to be Confederate Arizona, and appointed himself its governor, sent patrols up the Rio Grande to keep watch on the Union posts at Fort Craig and Fort Stanton near the 34th parallel, the proposed northern border of the new territory.

A 112-man detachment of Confederate Cavalry under Captain Bethel Coopwood with his Spy Company and units of the 2nd Texas Mounted Rifles followed a route north toward Fort Craig west of the Rio Grande and the wagon road along the foot of the mountains. Along the way, they noted various streams and springs their army might use.

Two days before the engagement at Canada Alamosa, on 23 September 1861, Coopwood's Confederate troops captured nine men from the New Mexico Volunteers, after a brief skirmish due north of Fort Craig. The force was questioned, and the Confederates learned that 350 men garrisoned the fort with no artillery. With this information, they turned to retrace their steps southward.

The Union Army, specifically the Regiment of Mounted Riflemen at Fort Craig, had launched a reconnaissance mission to guard against the approach of Confederate forces up the Rio Grande. The unit sent was a recently formed unit of New Mexican militia called Mink's Independent Cavalry Company. Captain John H. Minks company stopped at the village of San Ygnacio de la Alamosa (or La Alamosa), on the south side Arroyo Alamosa. There Mink ordered his men to build a camp next to the village. The camp consisted of a corral and breastworks, to subdue any possible and sudden Confederate counterattack.

== Battle ==
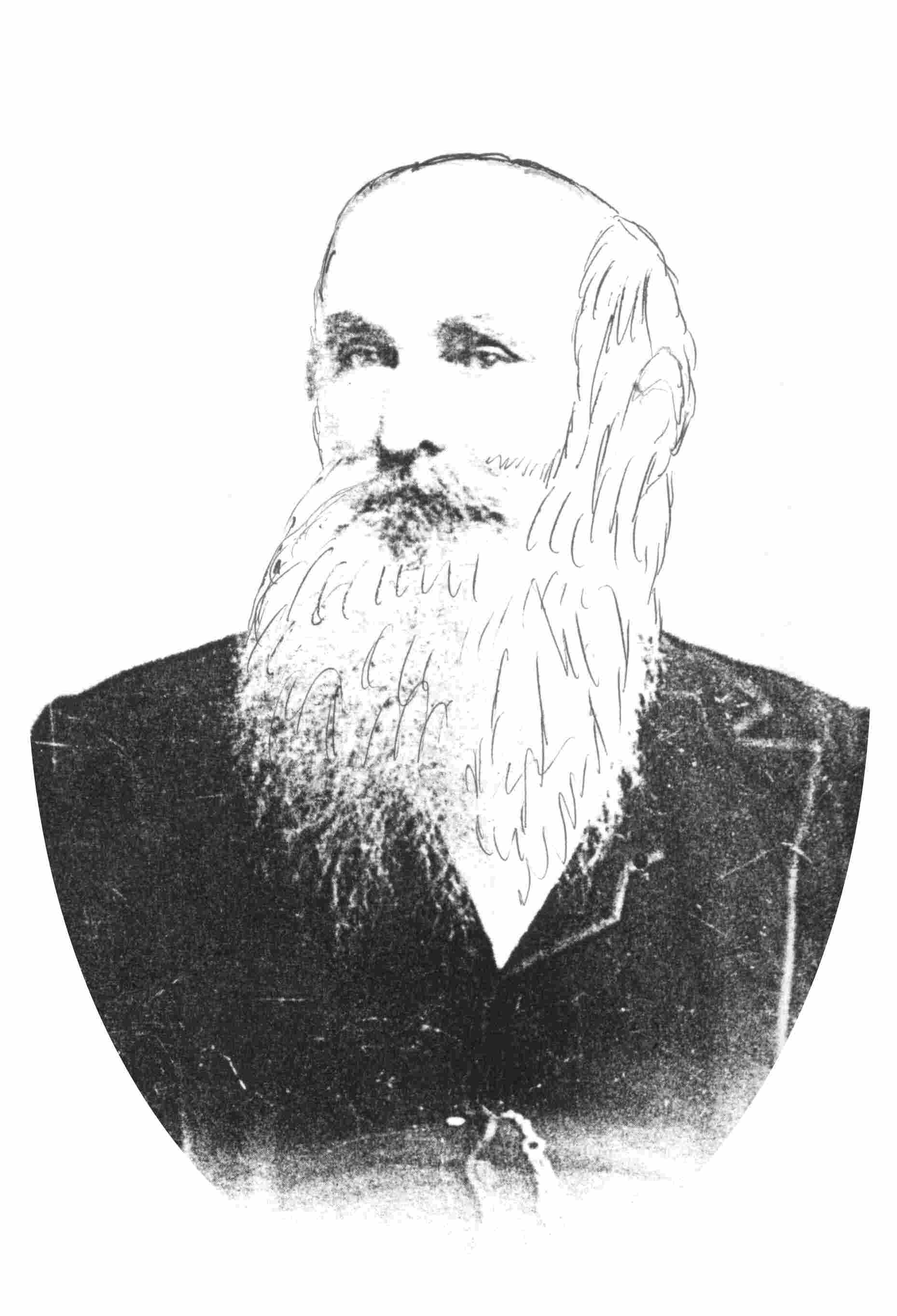
A portrait of Captain Bethel Coopwood

Before the corral and breastworks were finished on September 24, at about 5:00 pm, the Union force of around 100 and under Captain Minks, received information that mounted rebels had been seen in a southern direction from the camp. A six-man cavalry troop with a Mexican scout was dispatched who returned saying the sighted men were Union deserters who evaded capture. Later that night, Union troops at the Canada Alamosa camp reported another sighting of armed men. Some said the unknown men in the dark fired into the town but this has never been confirmed. In response, Captain Minks put his troops on high alert.

At this same time a few horses escaped the corral, about ten men were ordered to bring them back but some thirty ended up in the chase before Minks could prevent it, most of the thirty men deserted into the desert, crossing the Rio Grande to the east bank and headed for Paraje where another independent company of New Mexican cavalry guarded the approach along the Jornada del Muerto. A terrible Native American yell was heard, which had the Union troops thinking they were under attack by Apache. Then came the sound of cavalry and the shout "Here's their camp; give them hell!" At that moment the Union force knew they were not being attacked by Apaches but by twelve to fifteen Confederate troops, commanded by Captain Bethel Coopwood, from Mesilla.

The firing commenced, the rebel cavalry first attacked the Union Army's main line. After this attack was repulsed, the rebels fell back to the town. The dozen Confederate cavalrymen had attempted to rout the Union army with the cover of nightfall but failed due to the lack of firepower. The shooting stopped for a short while, this made the Captain and his men think the rebels had retreated or were playing a ruse to lure Minks' men into a more effective range.

So, Captain Minks and a number of his men slowly advanced into town on foot, leaving his main body at camp. Not seeing anything, the force withdrew to find that even more Union troops had deserted. Lieutenant Sanches, of the Union, was ordered to bring the deserters back, then Minks attacked. The attack was made to drive the rebels out of town or to set fire to the perimeter houses which provided cover for the Confederates. The United States cavalry advanced, with wood and matches.

Unfortunately for the Union, the Confederate force was larger than Minks had anticipated, 112 strong, they had also taken the houses Minks intended to burn. The advance was stopped by volleys of musket fire and after ten minutes the Union force had retreated back near camp at which they started from. By this time the Confederates had taken a hill next to the road which led to Fort Craig.

Fighting continued for a long while, at almost daybreak. Captain John Minks had found his men reduced to the number ten. The ten and the Captain fought off the Confederates at long range for a few hours more while trying to communicate with the main force in camp, once again, the main body had deserted or withdrew thinking Minks and his assault party had been massacred. The Captain realized this and decided to fight as long as possible in order to prevent the pursuit and capture of his retreating main body. Looking through his spyglass, Minks witnessed about sixty mounted rebels, ready to attack.

Minks surrendered between 7:00 and 8:00 am, in order to prevent further casualties to his remaining ten men. The retreating main body made its way back to their fort and then followed up their defeat with another patrol farther south of Canada Alamosa. Minks reported that only one of the remaining ten men was wounded. Confederate reports say four other men were killed and six wounded. The ten men and Captain Minks were taken to Mesilla as prisoners, twelve other troops, deserters or not, were also captured by the rebel cavalry. At least three Confederates were wounded, none were reported killed. The rebels also captured a good number of supplies and a few horses and wagons.

== Aftermath ==
The next day on September 26, 1861, after the battle of Canada Alamosa was over, the Union cavalry patrol under Captain Robert M. Morris, skirmished with Confederates involved in the Alamosa engagement in the Skirmish near Fort Thorn, New Mexico Territory. This skirmish occurred thirty miles southeast of the town at the north end of Mesilla Valley and 15 miles north of Fort Thorn.

Union Colonel Edward Canby, in his report of the engagement, said ten Confederates were killed and over thirty wounded in a fight that lasted one hour and forty-two minutes long. The rebel commander Coopwood in his report to Lt. Col. Baylor reported two of the men were killed and seven others wounded.

Captain Minks confirmed this with his report of the two skirmishes, written in captivity and allowed to be sent to his superiors. Union casualties were reported to be six wounded, this was one of the several other small battles in the region.

The intelligence Coopwood's Confederate troops obtained from nine men from the New Mexico Volunteers captured north of Fort Craig was returned to Baylor. They now knew that it only had a 350-man garrison and no artillery. Additionally, their work finding water sources along the mountains west of the Rio Grande would, the next year, allow the defeated Confederate Army to survive their retreat south to Fort Thorn following the Battle of Peralta that trapped them on the east bank.

== See also ==
- Apache Wars
- New Mexico Campaign
- Skirmish near Fort Thorn, New Mexico Territory
