= Robert Murray Morris =

Robert Murray Morris (1824–1896) was a military officer in the U. S. Army and Union Army. From 1846, he served as a U. S. Army officer in the Mexican–American War and in the antebellum western frontier of the United States in the Regiment of Mounted Rifles, renamed 3rd Cavalry Regiment in August 1861 at the start of the American Civil War. From 1863 he served as a Major in the 6th Cavalry Regiment in the Civil War and afterwards in Texas and Kansas until his retirement in 1873.

== Life and career ==
Robert Murray Morris was born in the District of Columbia on May 12, 1824, to Commodore Charles Morris and Harriet Bowen Morris. He entered the military academy of West Point, in July 1841 but resigned in January 1842. He was commissioned as second lieutenant in the Regiment of Mounted Rifles May 27, 1846 serving in the Mexican–American War, where he was cited for "Gallant and Meritorious conduct" in the battles of Contreras and Chapultepec.

Following the end of the war and evacuation of Mexico following the signing of the peace treaty, he took part in the 2,500-mile march of the Mounted Rifles to Oregon Territory from Missouri in 1849, where he served at Fort Vancouver from 1850–1851. In 1853–54 he served in an escort party for the Gunnison–Beckwith Expedition, in Utah.

He was subsequently stationed in New Mexico Territory and was stationed at Fort Craig when the American Civil War came to the territory in 1861. Morris commanded Companies C, G, and K, Regiment of Mounted Riflemen in an engagement against a Confederate cavalry force led by Captain Bethel Coopwood, called the Skirmish near Fort Thorn, on September 26, 1861. Coopwood was camped along the west bank of the Rio Grande, 15 miles above Fort Thorn, as they were retreating southward from their victory at the Battle of Canada Alamosa. Morris had been ordered to the aid of the Union force at Canada Alamosa, but finding that force defeated he pursued and fell on Coopwood's camp in the morning following a night march from Canada Alamosa. He engaged the Confederates for several hours before withdrawing due to lack of ammunition.

He later led his company in the Battle of Valverde where he was cited for "Gallant and Meritorious conduct." The Mounted Rifles were later sent east and reorganized as the 3rd Cavalry, and he was promoted to major and assigned to the 6th Cavalry in 1863. He was again cited for "Gallant and Meritorious conduct" for his actions in the March 31, 1865 Battle of Dinwiddie Court House in Virginia.

Following the end of the Civil War, he was sent with his regiment to enforce Reconstruction and fight Indians on the frontiers of Texas, and later he served on the frontiers of Kansas. He retired from the U.S. Army in 1873 as a Brevet Lt. Colonel.

== Later life ==
Morris returned to live in Washington, D.C. until 1889, when he moved to Martha's Vineyard. He died in Philadelphia, Pennsylvania, on December 7, 1896.
