= Independent Companies, New Mexico Volunteer Cavalry =

Independent Companies, New Mexico Volunteer Cavalry were volunteer cavalry companies in the Union Army during the American Civil War.

Among these Volunteer Companies, named for their captains, were:

- Mink's Independent Cavalry Company (1861)
- Graydon's Independent Cavalry Company (1862)
- Graydon's Independent Cavalry Company - Reorganized (1862)
- Haspell's Independent Cavalry Company (1861)
- Vidal's Independent Cavalry Company (1861)

== See also ==
- List of New Mexico Territory Civil War units
