= Skirmish near Fort Thorn, New Mexico Territory =

Part of the American Civil War (1861)

Coordinates: 33.068°N 107.285°W

- Part of the Trans-Mississippi Theater of the American Civil War
Date	September 26, 1861
Location	At E Company Grove, 15 mi (24 km) upriver from Fort Thorn, New Mexico Territory (USA), Confederate Arizona; Modern Day: Sierra County, New Mexico
Result	Confederate victory, unsuccessful Union counterattack.

Belligerents
Confederate States	United States

Commanders and leaders
Bethel Coopwood	Robert M. Morris

Strength
112 cavalry	101 cavalry

Casualties and losses
2 killed 8 wounded	3 wounded

The Skirmish near Fort Thorn, New Mexico Territory, also known as the Fight at E Company Grove, was a skirmish of the American Civil War on the morning of September 26, 1861. It followed the Battle of Canada Alamosa one of several small battles that occurred near the border between Confederate Arizona and Union New Mexico Territory. This one being an attempt by detachments of three companies of the Union Regiment of Mounted Rifles to pursue the Confederate cavalry force of Captain Bethel Coopwood's San Elizario Spy Company, and detachments of Company B and E, Second Texas Mounted Rifles, that was retiring from their victory at Canada Alamosa toward their base at Camp Robledo, 12 mi (19 km) north of Doña Ana, New Mexico.

== Background ==
Following his victory at Alamosa, Captain Bethel Coopwood paroled and released all the captured men without arms, only retaining as prisoners Captain John H. Minks, the wounded Second Lieutenant Matias Medina, and John Morrin, a wounded teamster, as prisoners on his march back to his base at Camp Robledo. From Alamosa Coopwood marched his force along the river road with the captured property taken to the place known as E Company Grove, and encamped for the night.

Meanwhile, express riders sent from Canada Alamosa to Fort Craig the evening before by Captain Minks, Lorenzo Tobats and Felis Gallegas, arrived at Fort Craig, with word that Minks was under attack by Confederates there. At 9 a.m. Captain Robert M. Morris left Fort Craig, with detachments of Companies C, G, and K, 3rd Cavalry Regiment as ordered by Capt. H. R. Selden, to move to the relief of Captain Minks' mounted volunteers, at Canada Alamosa. In the haste to reach Captain Minks in time they left Fort Craig hastily, and with only the ammunition in their cartridge boxes.

Morris send orders to the detachment of Captain Hubbell's New Mexican Volunteer Cavalry Company to join his command from their camp opposite Paraje where they were guarding the approach from the south through the Jornada del Muerto, which was under the command of First Lieutenant Charles Hubbell. Morris' reached Canada Alamosa at 4:30 p. m. and found that a number of the horses were too wearied to proceed. He left Lieutenant Brady (who was also too sick to proceed) in charge of the camp there, and resumed his march following the trail of Coopwood's Texan force, with 101 men. He marched until 3 a. m. the following morning, rested until daylight, then proceeded on the trail again.

== Battle ==
First Lieutenant Corydon E. Cooley of the Second New Mexico Volunteer Infantry Regiment (who acted as Morris' aide de camp), riding in advance, discovered the Texan's encampment at E Company Grove, 80 mi (130 km) from Fort Craig. Morris formed his command for a charge, but after examining their position, found them strongly posted and protected by a barricade of fallen timber, and saw it was futile to attempt a charge at that time. To test their strength Morris ordered Lieutenant Treacy, with Company C, to take position on their right flank and attack them, while Morris himself moved forward to attack them on their front and left.

Meanwhile, at his breakfast, Captain Coopwood was informed that his pickets were running into camp, and, rising to his feet, saw Morris's men pursuing them. In less than ten minutes the Confederate camp was surrounded by U. S. troops, that Coopwood believed numbered about 190 men.

Captain Morris wrote:

Taking up my position, a single shot was fired. I immediately dismounted and went into action, which lasted an hour and forty-two minutes.

Coopwood wrote that:

...firing commenced at 7 o'clock and ended at 11 a. m.

The principal portion of the battle was fought with the enemy's force formed in two lines, forming the angle of a square, and my forces formed the same way inside of theirs, my lines being much the shorter. One of my lines was composed of the detachment from Captain Pyron's company and a portion of the detachment from Captain Stafford's company, under the immediate command of Lieutenant Poore, Sergeant O'Grady, and Sergeant Browne. My left line was composed of the detachment from my company and a part of the detachment from Captain Stafford's company. This line was under the immediate command of Lieutenant Sutherland, being divided into two platoons, one led by Sergeant Coulter, and the other by Private Tevis, who was named for the special occasion.

The enemy began to retreat before 11, and about that hour fled from the field.

Morris wrote about his withdrawal:

My ammunition running low, I retired a half mile as a feint to draw them out from their entrenchments, but without success. I then turned their right and camped 2 1/2 miles from them, where I remained till 5 p. m.; then I moved up the creek and encamped, where I remained until dark, and then moved back on Canada Alamosa with my wounded, which place I reached at 4 a. m. on the 27th instant.

Coopwood wrote that:

I remained upon the field till 10 o'clock a. m. the next day, but was prepared to receive another attack should the enemy return re-enforced." I lost 2 men killed, and had 2 severely wounded, each in the arm, besides 6 others slightly wounded,..... The enemy removed their dead and wounded as they retreated, so as to evade a discovery of their losses; but, from the number of horses led away with bodies apparently lashed across them, there were 12 or 13 killed, but the number of their wounded could not be ascertained.

Captain Morris did not put the number of his casualties in his report, but that of his superior, Col. E. R. S. Canby reported that both sides had roughly equal numbers engaged and both the Confederate loss and that of Morris. "Their captain, 10 men, and 22 horses were killed, 30 men and a large number of horses wounded. In Captain Morris' command 3 men were wounded." This roughly quadrupled the actual Confederate loss of men and wrongly asserted Captain Coopwood was killed. Captain Coopwood himself overestimated the number of Union troops he engaged and had also overestimated the loss to the Union troops in a similar manner.

== See also ==
- New Mexico campaign
