= Monticello, New Mexico =

Monticello
- Unincorporated community
- Location within the state of New Mexico Monticello (the United States)
- Coordinates: 33°23′49″N 107°27′03″W
- Country: United States
- State: New Mexico
- County: Sierra
- Elevation: 5,256 ft (1,602 m)
- Time zone: UTC-7 (Mountain (MST))
  - Summer (DST): UTC-6 (MDT)
- Area code: 575
- GNIS feature ID: 908852

Monticello is an unincorporated community located in Sierra County, New Mexico, United States. Monticello is located on Alamosa Creek, 22 miles (35 km) northwest of Truth or Consequences. Monticello has a post office with ZIP code 87939.

== History ==
=== Canada Alamosa ===
What became Monticello was first some farms established by 1863 in the upper part of the valley, originally named Cañada Alamosa, through which Alamosa Creek (then called Arroyo Alamosa or Rio Alamosa) ran to the Rio Grande. These farms were owned by residents of a native New Mexican agricultural settlement named San Ygnacio de la Alamosa that had been founded in 1859. San Ygnacio de la Alamosa, commonly called Alamosa, was located at the confluence of the Arroyo Alamosa and the Rio Grande along the wagon road that ran along the west side of the river between Fort Craig and Fort Thorn. Alamosa was the town that was called Canada Alamosa in Union Army reports, that was the site of Battle of Canada Alamosa between a Confederate reconnaissance force under Bethel Coopwood and New Mexican militia under John H. Minks.

Flooding along the Rio Grande in the summer of 1862, destroyed crops in the river valley at Alamosa. This resulted, in 1863, in the relocation of farms up the Cañada Alamosa to an area watered by springs, near the mountains, below the mouth of a narrow canyon from which the Arroyo Alamosa flowed. After flooding destroyed Alamosa in 1867 many of its residents moved up the valley to farm near and live in the new town, called Canada Alamosa, that had been organized sometime between 1864 and 1866. Others moved across the river and downstream a couple of miles to start a new town Alamocita to farm on the opposite side of the river. Alamocita also was six miles north of Fort McRae established in April 1863 to protect these new settlements from the Apache, along with the traffic along the river and the old road to the east in the Jornada del Muerto. This fort and its garrison would provide its protection and economic benefits to citizens of the towns over the years of its operation until it was closed on October 30, 1876.

=== Monticello ===
In 1881, Canada Alamosa was renamed Monticello, after Monticello, New York, the former home of an influential early settler. A post office called Monticello has been in operation since 1881.

== Education ==
Truth or Consequences Municipal Schools is the school district for the entire county. Truth or Consequences Middle School and Hot Springs High School, both in Truth or Consequences, are the district's secondary schools.
