= Independent Companies, New Mexico Volunteer Militia Infantry =

The Independent Companies of New Mexico Militia were units of infantry raised within the New Mexico Territory to serve a three-month term of service for the Union Army during the American Civil War, from November 1861 to February 1862. They were organized for use within the territory, in defense against Indian attacks and invasion by the Texas Rangers.

== Militia Companies ==
=== Perea's Battalion of Militia ===
Organized in November and December 1861 for the defenses of New Mexico, the four companies were raised and financially supported by Lt Col Francisco Perea. Stationed at Albuquerque, the battalion was engaged in several campaigns against the Navajo. It was mustered out on 28 February 1862.

=== Alarid's Company ===
Under the command of Gaspar Ortiz y Alarid, it was organized in Santa Fe, New Mexico on 10 December 1861, and served until its mustering out on 28 February 1862.

=== Gonzales' Company ===
Organized at Fort Craig, it was mustered on 23 November 1861 and served until 28 February 1862. It was under the command of Nestor Gonzales.

=== Mora County Militia ===
This company was raised in Mora, New Mexico, and was led by Jose Ignacio Martinez. It served from 14 November 1861 to 28 February 1862. It was reorganized as Company A of the 1st Regiment New Mexico Volunteer Militia Infantry, where it served another three months.

=== Tafolla's Company ===
This was the company of Luis Tafolla, and was organized at Fort Craig. They served from 20 November 1861 to 28 February 1862.

== See also ==
- List of New Mexico Territory Civil War units

== See also ==
- List of New Mexico Territory Civil War units
- New Mexico in the American Civil War
