= Cuchillo, New Mexico =

Unincorporated community in New Mexico, US

Coordinates: 33°14′09″N 107°21′38″W

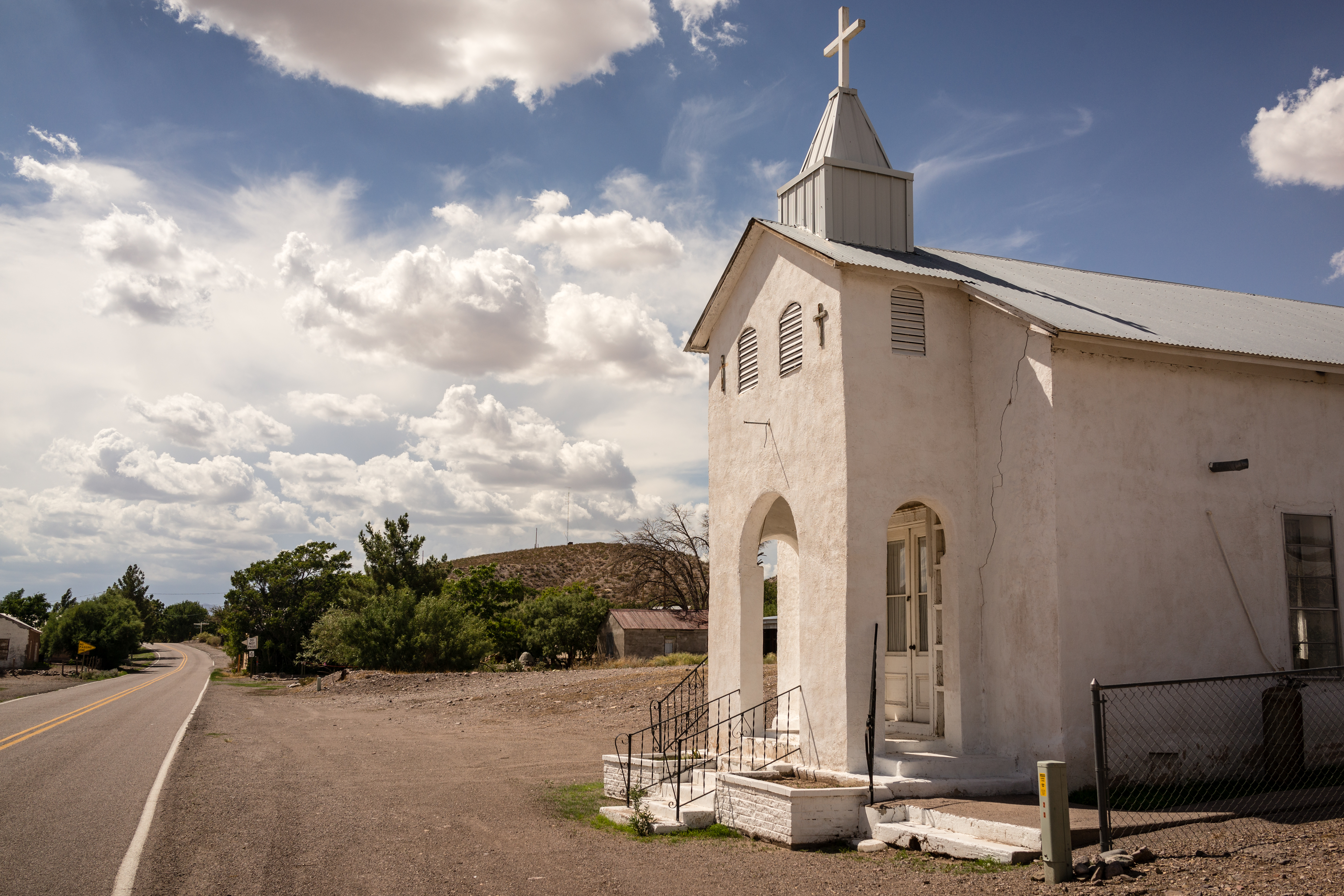
St. Joseph Church

Cuchillo, originally known as Cuchillo Negro, is an unincorporated community in Sierra County, New Mexico, United States. It was named for Apache chieftain Baishan, known by his Spanish name Cuchillo Negro ("Black Knife"), who was killed in a skirmish with American troops in 1857. It is on the north bank of Cuchillo Negro Creek. Cuchillo's name change came after the 1900 Census. It was recorded under its one-word name in the 1910 Census.

== History ==
The town was thought to have been founded by at least 1871. That place had not appeared in the 1870 Census; however, areas along Cuchillo Negro Creek between there and the Rio Grande had been farmed for some time before 1869, according to the local Indian Agent's report of his tour of the area in that year. They had been planted by people from Alamocita, to the west on the Rio Grande, in late 1867. Alamocita was founded by former residents of Alamosa abandoned after it was destroyed by a flood in 1867. The agent believed they were planting crops of corn for supplying the Southern Apache being rationed at Canada Alamosa and in anticipation of a reservation being formed in that vicinity.

Some of these farmers were living in the area until, on January 10, 1872, The Borderer, of Las Cruces, published a letter from a newspaper publisher writing from Alemán Ranch that settlers on the Cuchillo Negro were all coming in for fear of an Indian outbreak. On September 19 of that year, Gen. O. O. Howard wrote from a New Mexican hamlet he called Cuchillo, that he had bought 30 days' rations at a general store there for the Apache band of Ponce, in return for his help in finding and getting Cochise to meet with Howard to make peace. The town first appears as the Plaza Cuchillo Negro on a 1875 Diagram of Southern Apache Indian Reservation. This probably indicated that the houses of the residents had been built in a typical fashion for New Mexico frontier settlements. They were often located around a central plaza forming a defensive wall around it on the outside, as protection from the raids of hostile Apache or Navajo.

The town of Cuchillo Negro first appears on the Census of June 1880. It found the town had 233 occupants in 51 houses. All but three of the population were native born New Mexicans. Fifty-five heads of families were farmers, thirty were laborers, two were freighters, one a tailor and one a miner. In 1881, the creek at the town and below was described as being a fine stream of excellent water, and the land was all susceptible to irrigation by the stream.

A post office began operations at Cuchillo Negro from 1883, and has continued to the present day. By 1895, the town was reported as having developed a community ditch irrigation system which was described, as originating at a diversion dam eight miles upstream, that irrigated 300 acres at the town, and 200 acres farther upstream from private ditches.

In 1928, the community ditch irrigated 450 acres and there were other diversion dams and private ditches up stream as far as Chise and beyond. Three private ditches below the town, diverted any flood waters to irrigate hay fields and pasture. In 1940, only 400 acres were irrigated at the town by the ditch.

== Education ==
Truth or Consequences Municipal Schools is the school district for the entire county. Truth or Consequences Middle School and Hot Springs High School, both in Truth or Consequences, are the district's secondary schools.

== See also ==
- Monticello, New Mexico
