= Monticello Box =

Box canyon in Socorro County, New Mexico

Coordinates: 33°34′10″N 107°35′36″W

Monticello Box or Monticello Box Canyon is a narrow canyon, a gap and a box canyon in the middle of the wider valley or glen of Monticello Canyon. The two wider valleys are separated by a narrower canyon, with a gap and box canyon called the Monticello Box at its head.
