= Cuchillo Negro Creek =

Stream in New Mexico, U.S.

Cuchillo Negro Creek is a stream in Sierra County, in the U.S. state of New Mexico. The stream is a tributary of the Rio Grande.

The stream headwaters are at the confluence of Poverty Creek with Schoolhouse Canyon just east of the community of Winston, south of New Mexico State Road 52 and west of the Sierra Cuchillo at 33°20′50″N 107°38′45″W. The stream flows south to southeast passing Chise and Cuchillo. It continues, passing northeast of the Mud Springs Mountains and crossing under I-25 to its confluence adjacent to New Mexico State Road 51. The confluence lies just northeast of Truth or Consequences and just below the Elephant Butte Dam at 33°08′54″N 107°13′16″W.

The creek derives its name from Cuchillo Negro ("black knife"), an Apache chief.

== See also ==
- List of rivers of New Mexico
