= Monticello Canyon =

Valley in New Mexico

Monticello Canyon, originally known in Spanish as the Cañada Alamosa (Glen of the Cottonwoods), is a valley or glen drained by Alamosa Creek in Sierra County and Socorro County, New Mexico, United States. Its mouth is at an elevation of 4,419 feet (1,347 meters), in Sierra County. Its head is at 33°34′10″N 107°35′36″W at an elevation of 7,540 feet (2,300 meters) in the San Mateo Mountains, within the Cibola National Forest, in Socorro County.

Monticello Canyon is a valley divided into three distinct parts. One is the upper cañada (valley or glen) that lies between the San Mateo Mountains on the north and east (where it has its head), and the Black Range to the west and the Sierra Cuchillo on the southwest. The second lower valley is one the original Spanish settlers named, Cañada Alamosa. It ran from the widened mouth of the canyon southeasterly to the Rio Grande. The two valleys are separated by a narrower canyon, with a gap and box canyon called the Monticello Box at its head at 33°34′10″N 107°35′36″W. That canyon cuts down through and divides the San Mateo Mountains to the northeast from the Sierra Cuchillo on the southwest. The canyon opens up and fields appear just below where the Cañada Viviancito enters Alamosa Creek. The Monticello community ditch originates just above this location and runs down through Monticello.
