= List of New Mexico Territory units in the American Civil War =

The New Mexico Territory provided the following units for the Union army during the American Civil War. Not yet a state of the Union, it did not have a required quota of soldiers to raise. However, 6,561 men volunteered their services. They were primarily raised for defenses within the territory.

== Infantry ==
5 regiments were provided for three year terms, while one regiment and 11 companies were raised for three-months service.

- 1st Regiment New Mexico Volunteer Militia Infantry (November, 1861 - February, 1862)
- 1st Regiment New Mexico Volunteer Infantry (July, 1861 - May, 1862)
- 1st New Mexico Volunteer Infantry, Reorganized (October 1, 1863 - November 7, 1866)
- 2nd Regiment New Mexico Volunteer Infantry (July, 1861 - May, 1862)
- 3rd Regiment New Mexico Volunteer Infantry (mounted) (August, 1861 - May, 1862)
- 4th Regiment New Mexico Volunteer Infantry (September, 1861 - May, 1862)
- 5th Regiment New Mexico Volunteer Infantry (November, 1861 - May, 1862)
- Independent Companies, New Mexico Volunteer Militia Infantry

== Cavalry ==
Initially 5 three-month companies were raised.

- Independent Companies, New Mexico Volunteer Cavalry

Subsequently one three-year regiment was raised, and then one 6-month regiment.

- 1st Regiment New Mexico Volunteer Cavalry (org from 1st, 2nd, 4th and 5th Reg'ts of New Mexico Vol. Inf., May, 1862 - September 30, 1866)
- 1st Battalion New Mexico Cavalry and Infantry (org from 1st Reg't Cav August 31, 1866 - November 23, 1867)

== See also ==
- Lists of American Civil War Regiments by State
- New Mexico in the American Civil War
