= Sierra Cuchillo =

Mountain range in New Mexico, United States

Coordinates: 33°20′54″N 107°35′55″W

Sierra Cuchillo (knife mountains) or Cuchillo Negro Mountains is a range of mountains, primarily in Sierra County and some in southern Socorro County, New Mexico. They were named for the knife-like shape of some of the peaks in the range, or for Cuchillo Negro an Apache leader in the region in the mid 19th century.
