= Bethel Coopwood =

Confederate Army officer (1827–1907)

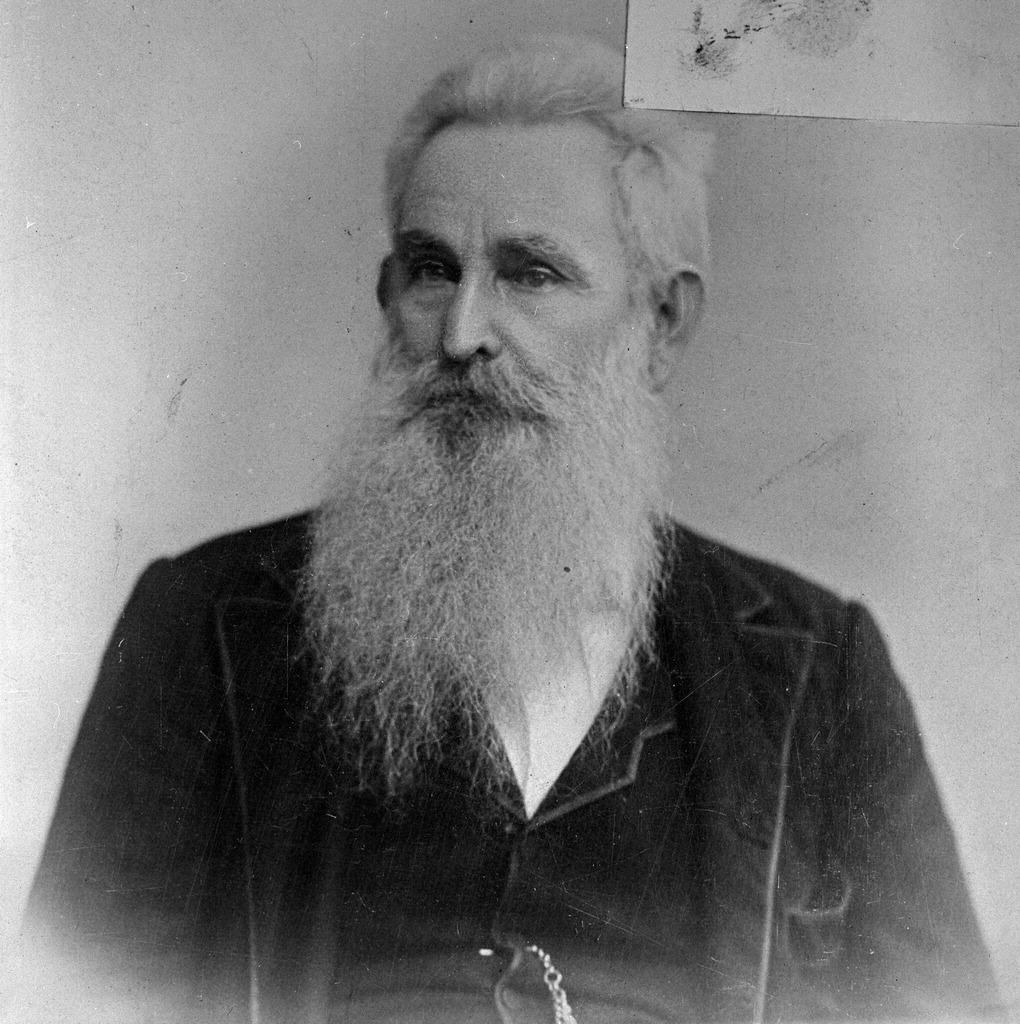
Bethel Coopwood

Bethel Coopwood (1827–1907) was a notable frontier figure of the American Southwest. He was born in Alabama, moved to Texas, was a soldier in the Mexican–American War, and an officer in the Confederate Army in the American Civil War. He also was a lawyer, judge, and later a historian.

== Early life, Alabama, Texas ==
Bethel Coopwood was born on May 1, 1827, in Lawrence County, Alabama, son of an early settler, planter and slaveholder in that county, David E. Coopwood, and Elfida Crews Coopwood. Following the death of his father in 1846, he moved to Texas. In 1847, he enlisted in Bell's cavalry detachment, of Hay's Regiment of Texas Mounted Volunteers, that served along the Rio Grande frontier in the Mexican–American War. By 1850 his brother Benjamin had settled in Tyler County, Texas. By 1852 his brother David Coopwood had moved to Tyler County also.

== Southern California ==
In 1854 he and his two brothers Benjamin and David and their wives left Texas, moving to El Monte, California, where he was admitted to the bar, practicing in Los Angeles. In early 1857, following the killing of Sheriff James R. Barton and two men of his posse by the Flores Daniel Gang, Coopwood led twenty-six El Monte men, as a division of the posse in the manhunt for the gang. He distinguished himself in the assault on the peak the gang had taken refuge on, charging up hill, under fire with an injured leg.

In the fall of 1857, at the age of thirty, he came to San Bernardino, California, as part of a syndicate that purchased the balance of the Rancho San Bernardino from Ebenezer Hanks for $18,000. Hanks had previously purchased a one-third interest in the grant, with Amasa Lyman and Charles C. Rich leaders of the Mormon colonists of San Bernardino from the original grantee José del Carmen Lugo.

On June 15, 1859, Coopwood married Josephine Woodward, a local San Bernardino girl, and they eventually had fourteen children. In September, he ran for San Bernardino County District Attorney in 1859, but lost by a narrow margin.

Also in September 1859, two San Bernardino doctors began a quarrel that escalated into violence. Bethel Coopwood became embroiled in the Ainsworth - Gentry Affair, by protecting Doctor Ainsworth, from the threatened violence of an anti-Mormon faction of armed men from El Monte supporting Doctor Gentry in his quarrel with Ainsworth. After many of the El Monte Boys were persuaded to return to their homes, Bethel sheltered Ainsworth at his adobe house with the aid of some friends and relatives, including his brother David. That night, Frank Green and the remainder of the Gentry faction organized themselves across from the house that sat amidst a fenced cornfield. The defenders quietly arranged themselves along the fence facing them. When the anti-Mormon began their advance they heard the defenders making ready to shoot and withdrew in haste.

However, on the following day there was a gunfight in the streets of the town with the Gentry faction that was the climax of the September 18th - 20th, 1859 "Ainsworth - Gentry Affair." On the Ainsworth side, David Coopwood, was wounded in the arm, the ball passing through to the shoulder blade; Bethel Coopwood, was wounded in the leg, wrist and mouth; Mat Welsh, received a slight wound. On the Gentry side, Frank Green of El Monte, was wounded in the back after a hand to hand struggle with Taney Woodward, Bethel's brother-in-law,(both armed and firing handguns).

In the bitterly contested campaign of 1860, Charles W. Piercy was nominated for member of the 1st District of the California General Assembly by one party, and W. A. Conn the incumbent, by the other. Piercy was elected, but there was a claim of fraud. The accusation was that polls at Temescal, maintained by a resident named James Greenwade, kept open shop for three weeks and that whenever candidate Piercy was in need of more votes, they were furnished from this precinct. The case was taken to court, where the two opposing lawyers, H. M. Willis and Bethel Coopwood, had a fight in court wherein Coopwood sustained a slight wound, but won the case.

Coopwood remained in San Bernardino until 1861, as realtor and a lawyer and with an excellent knowledge of Spanish and a number of Californio clients, most of whom were very well off.

== Civil War ==
In 1861, Coopwood disposed of his interests in California and returned to Texas with his brothers Benjamin and David. He entered the Confederate Army as a captain in the cavalry and served until 1863.

In 1861, he formed the San Elizario Spy Company or Coopwood Spy Company, an Independent Volunteer Company of cavalry with men who came with him from California. He commanded a reconnaissance against Fort Craig, during which he led the Confederate forces in the Battle of Canada Alamosa, and in the Skirmish near Fort Thorn, the largest of several small battles that occurred in Confederate Arizona along the front with Union held New Mexico Territory. During his reconnaissance against Fort Craig, Coopwood approached along the eastern slope of the mountains to the west of the fort, where they found streams and springs that would later be the salvation of the Texan Army.

Coopwood and his company served in Henry Hopkins Sibley's New Mexico Campaign. He was ill with smallpox during the Battle of Valverde, but recovered in time to join the army at the Battle of Albuquerque and the Battle of Peralta. After the Battle of Peralta he and his Spy Company were responsible for saving the remnants of Sibley's army, 1800 men, from Union pursuit by finding water and a path for them through the rugged mountains west of the Rio Grande to the Mesilla Valley. He was later promoted to Major and then Lt. Colonel before ending his service in the Confederate Army in 1863.

== Later life ==
After the Civil War he spent a year in Coahuila, Mexico. There he was nearly killed and his brother, David, drowned after being shot by troops of Juan Cortina while traveling on the steamboat Bell on the Rio Grande. His claim against Mexico for money for his brother’s widow was unsuccessful. He returned to Texas and became recognized as an able lawyer and Spanish scholar in the lower Rio Grande valley. He contributed articles to and wrote book reviews for early issues of the Texas State Historical Association Quarterly, in which he published "Notes on the History of La Bahía del Espíritu Santo" in 1898–99 and "The Route of Cabeza de Vaca" in 1899–1900. Judge Coopwood died in Austin on December 26, 1907.
