= Palomas Creek (Rio Grande tributary) =

Palomas Creek, also named Las Palomas Creek, and Palomas River, is a tributary stream of the Rio Grande in Sierra County, New Mexico. Its mouth is located at an elevation of 4,206 feet (1,282 meters). Its source is at 33°10′44″N 107°32′02″W at the confluence of the North Fork and South Fork Palomas Creek at an elevation of 5,298 / 1,615 meters. The North Fork Palomas Creek has its source near the Continental Divide in the Black Range within the Gila National Forest at 33°15′55″N 107°49′27″W at an elevation of 7,400 / 2,444 meters. The South Fork Palomas Creek similarly has its source in the Black Range in the same National Forest at 33°09′55″N 107°51′08″W just below the Continental Divide at an elevation of 8,960 / 2,959 meters.
