= Fort Craig - Fort Thorn Wagon Road =

Fort Craig - Fort Thorn Wagon Road, was a road ran down along the west bank of the Rio Grande, from a turnoff from the west bank route of the Camino Real de Tierra Adentro to the ford of Valverde, to Fort Craig and on to Fort Thorn. There at or near Fort Thorn were roads south into Texas and west toward Arizona and California.

The wagon road was following the wagon road route established during Mexican American War by Cooke's Mormon Battalion in 1846. They had been following an old route occasionally followed by earlier Spanish and later Mexican travelers. It was soon after the end of the Mexican American War that the same wagon road Cooke had established was followed by many others intent on joining the California Gold Rush by way of the Santa Fe Trail, the route of the Camino Real from Santa Fe to the turn off near the Val Verde ford, Cooke's route down the Rio Grande, to the turnoff to Cooke's Wagon Road, across New Mexico Territory to join the Gila Trail to the Yuma Crossing into California. By 1857 Cooke's route down the Rio Grande was a well beaten route used by supply trains for the forts and many other travelers.
