= Elephant Butte Reservoir =

Reservoir on the Rio Grande in New Mexico, United States

- Location within New Mexico Location within the United States
- Location: Sierra County, New Mexico
- Coordinates: 33°14′19.43″N 107°10′26.23″W
- Lake type: Hydroelectric reservoir
- Basin countries: United States
- Surface area: 36,500 acres (14,800 ha)
- Water volume: 2,065,010 acre⋅ft (2.54715 km^{3})
- Surface elevation: 4,414 ft (1,345 m)

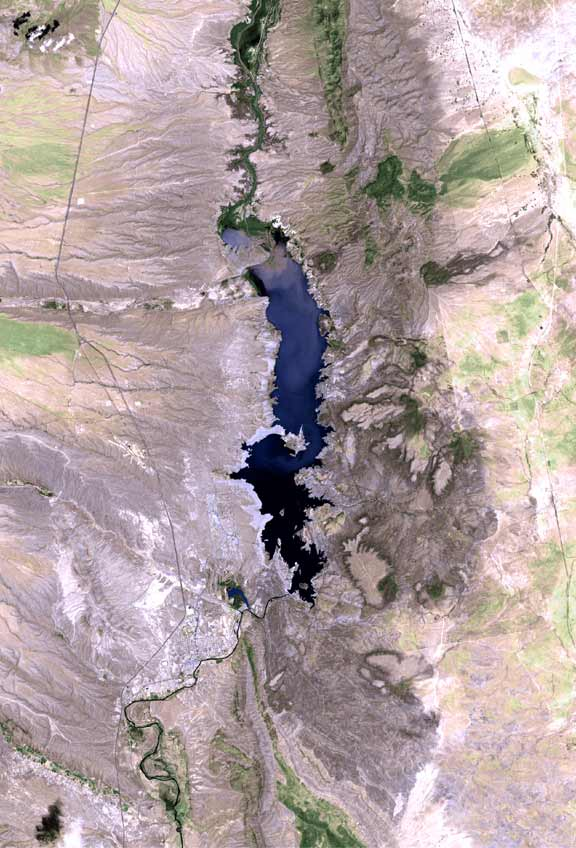
Satellite image of Elephant Butte Reservoir.

Elephant Butte Reservoir or Elephant Butte Lake is the largest reservoir in the U.S. state of New Mexico, 130 miles (289 km) from El Paso, Texas, and 5 miles (8.0 km) north of Truth or Consequences.

The reservoir began filling in 1915, and at full capacity became the largest man-made lake in the world. Built as part of the Rio Grande Project, it was intended to revive the fertility of farmland soil in the Rincon and Mesilla Valleys. Today, the reservoir's storage remains crucial to the Rio Grande, as it provides power and irrigation water to New Mexico, Texas, and Mexico.

It is impounded by Elephant Butte Dam and became part of the largest state park in New Mexico, Elephant Butte Lake State Park, in 1964. Before it was known as Elephant Butte, there were three prospective names — Lake Esperanza, Lake Hall, and Lake Engle. Ultimately, Elephant Butte Reservoir was named after the Elephant-shaped butte in its territory.

The reservoir can hold 2,065,010 acre-feet (2.54715 km^{3}) of water from a drainage of 28,900 square miles (74,850 km^{2}). It provides irrigation to 178,000 acres (72,000 ha) of farmland.

== Etymology ==
The reservoir, dam, and surrounding area are named after a nearby volcanic core, "Elephant Butte," similarly to Devils Tower, in Wyoming. It is now an island in the lake when the water levels are high.

== Dam construction and history ==
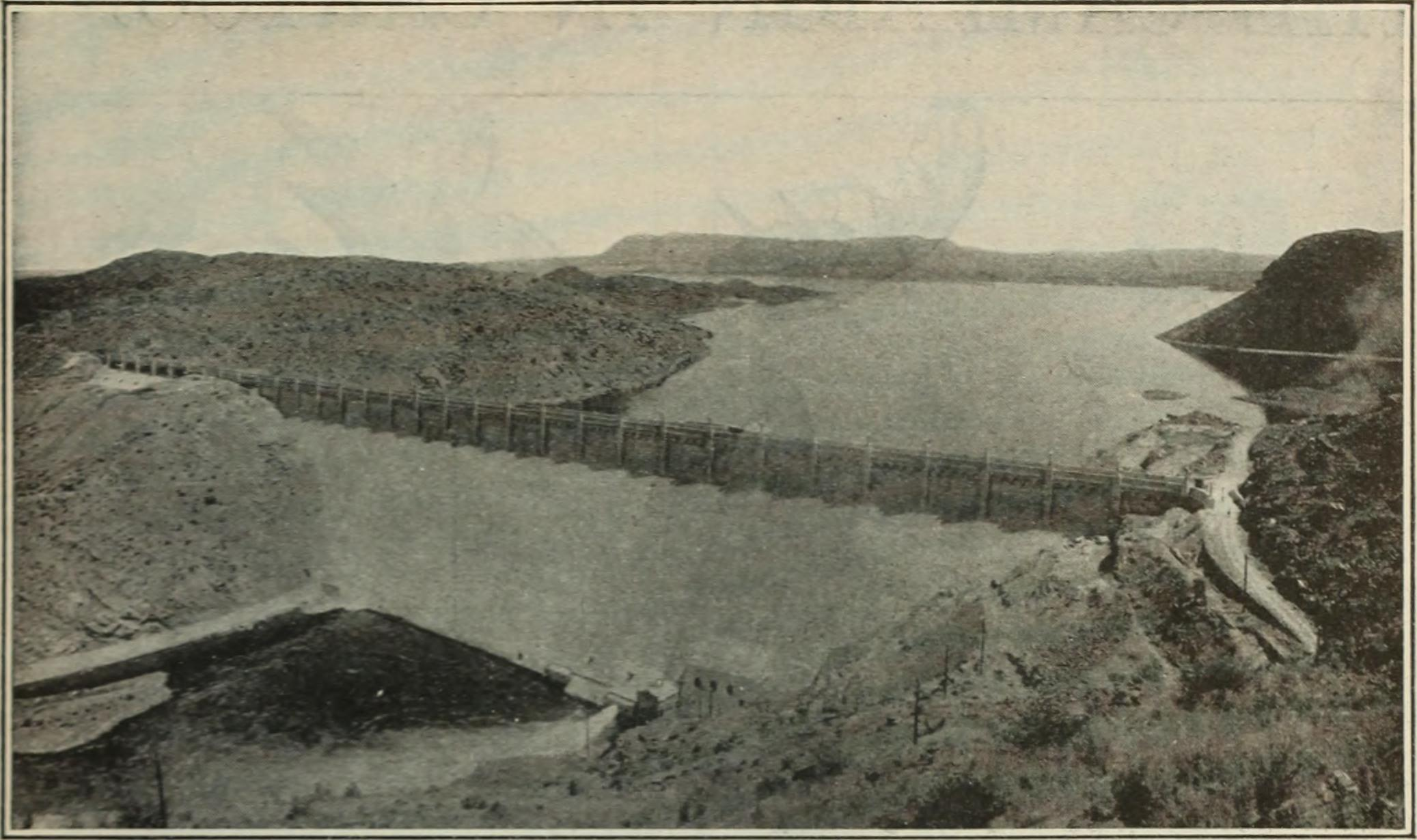

Before the construction of the reservoir and dam in 1911, Spanish settlers built the first acequias, an irrigation ditch, near today's Española, Santa Fe, Las Cruces, Doña Ana, and Mesilla. In 1848, The Treaty of Guadalupe Hidalgo upheld Mexican citizens' property rights, which included the acequias. In 1906, the reservoir features in the 1906 Boundary Waters Convention between the United States and Mexico, which specified how much water should be delivered to Mexico after the dam's completion.

Elephant Butte Dam was constructed between 1911 and 1916, with the reservoir fill starting in 1915. It was a major engineering feat in its day, and the enormous concrete dam is the major feature of the Elephant Butte Historic District. New Mexico State Parks operates a visitor center, which contains information on the construction of the dam. It was the second-largest irrigation dam ever built at the time of its construction and was surpassed only in 1970 by the Aswan Dam in Egypt, and the reservoir was the largest man-made lake on earth.

A large construction community sprang up, which included two worker camps, railways, water tanks, cableway systems, and the former administration building of the Bureau of Reclamation. The "camps" housed American and Mexican workers throughout the dam's construction. One of the former camps ended up under the reservoir itself; the other disappeared altogether. Moreover, many centuries-old communities and farming villages were "obliterated" by the filling of the reservoir and now lie at the bottom, including complete stone structures. Over 2,000 people were displaced by the filling of the reservoir.

== Water storage ==
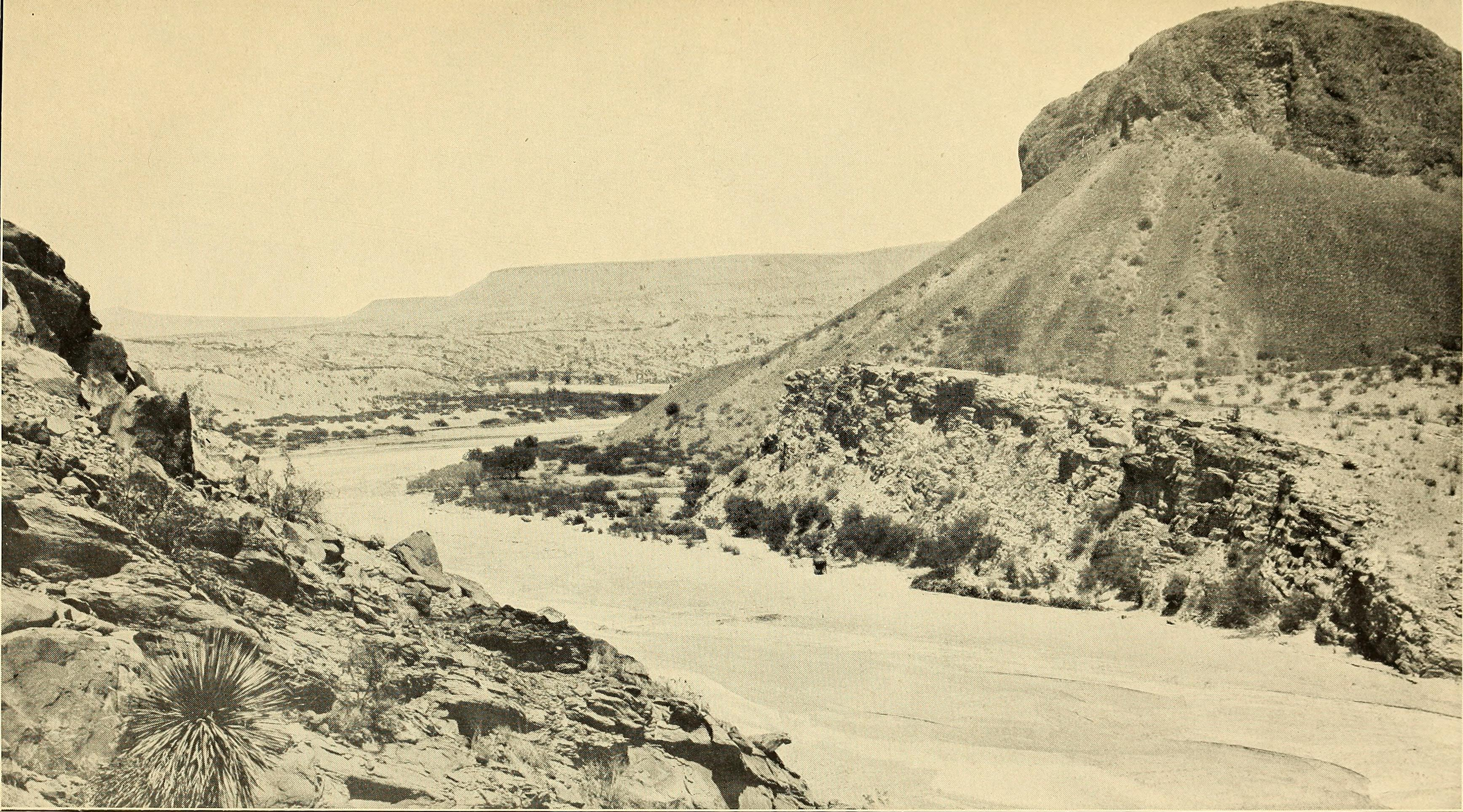
Water Resources of the Rio Grande Valley in New Mexico and their Development (1907).

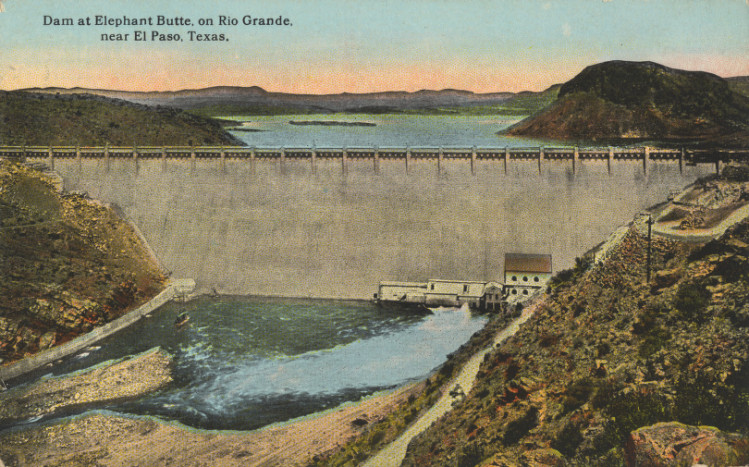
Elephant Butte Dam, on the Rio Grande.

When the reservoir filled in 1915, irrigation use downstream was much more limited than today, which allowed the lake to remain relatively full. In May 1942, the lake experienced a highstand for the first time. Another longer-lived highstand occurred in July 1985 and lasted with the spillway in use until 1988.

By 1950, the "full production" use, prolonged droughts, and low snowpack melt from Coloradoan mountains caused water levels to fall below the 1915 levels, in both the reservoir and Upper Rio Grande. In recent years, Elephant Butte stores just 3% of its 2-million acre-foot capacity. Consequently, the drought effects are permanent for farming and local water sources. For example, the village of Magdalena, 100 miles north of the reservoir, was forced to use bottled water after its wells ran dry. Similarly, farmers in the surrounding area of El Paso are beginning to rely on costly groundwater sources instead of irrigation runoff to save crops like pecans and chiles.

The reservoir's low water levels are detrimental to the vitality of the Rio Grande, specifically the Lower Rio Grande, which has been considered one of the nation's most endangered bodies of water for decades. Per the 1906 Treaty Convention, the reservoir must provide 60,000 acre feet of water annually to Mexico's Acequias and Rio Grande, however climate change factors, like the rise in global temperature, prevent those measures from happening.

In 2014, a group celebrating a bachelor party on the exposed sediments of the lake discovered the head and tusks of a 3.2-million-year-old stegomastodon, a relative of true elephants, in excellent condition. That is one of the most complete finds of a stegomastodon in the area. The skull is on display at the New Mexico Museum of Natural History and Science.

== Species ==
Over one million people visit Elephant Butte annually, making it New Mexico's most popular outdoor recreation destination. Activities include camping, scuba diving, swimming, birding, fishing, and general wildlife watching.

The reservoir attracts an abundance of waterbirds and shorebirds, particularly during fall and spring migration along the surrounding marinas. Common bird species include American White Pelicans, Gulls,Terns, Waders, Loons, Waterfowl, Grebes and Ducks.

Shorebirds found in Elephant Butte Reservoir

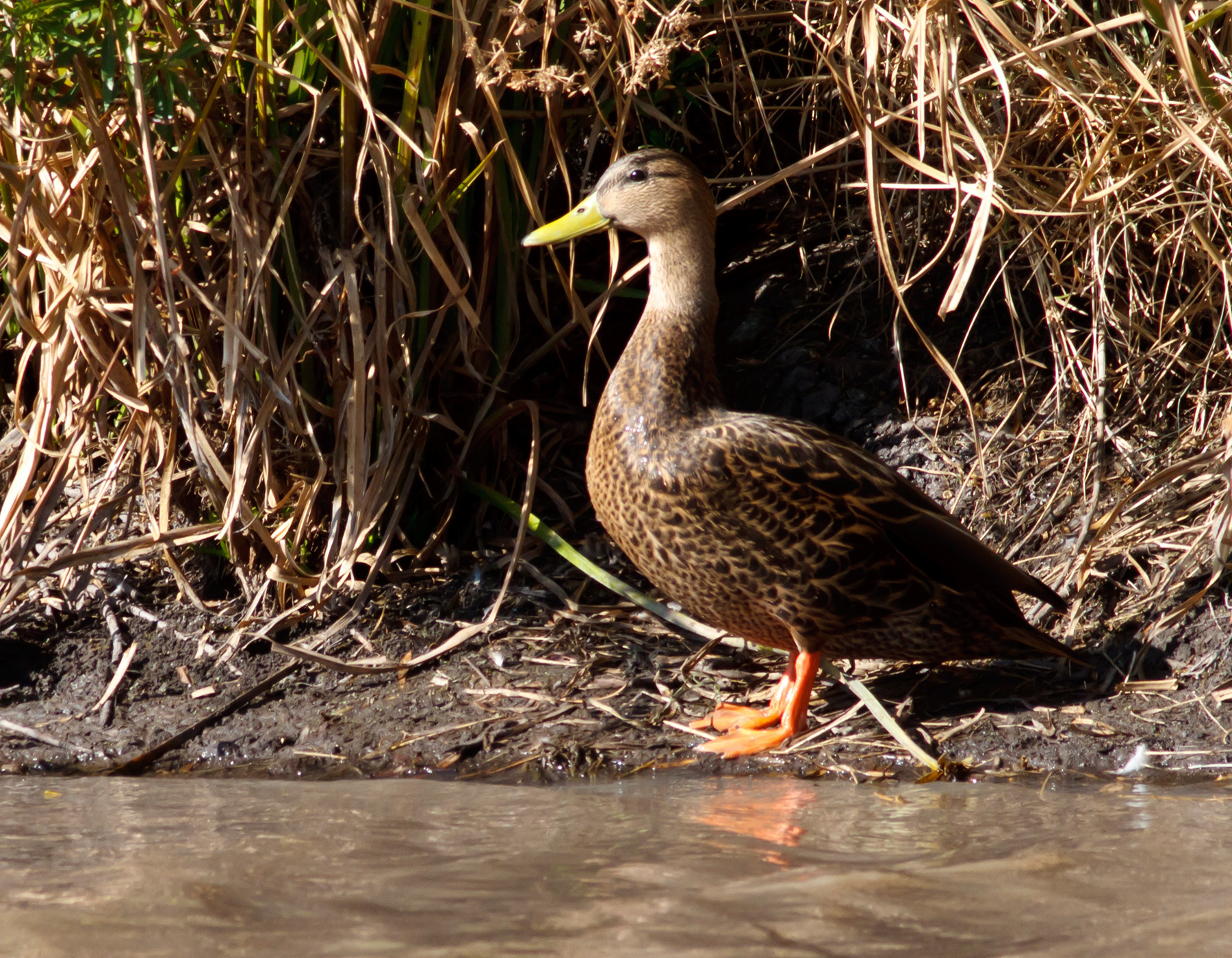
Mallard Duck (Anas platyrhynchos)

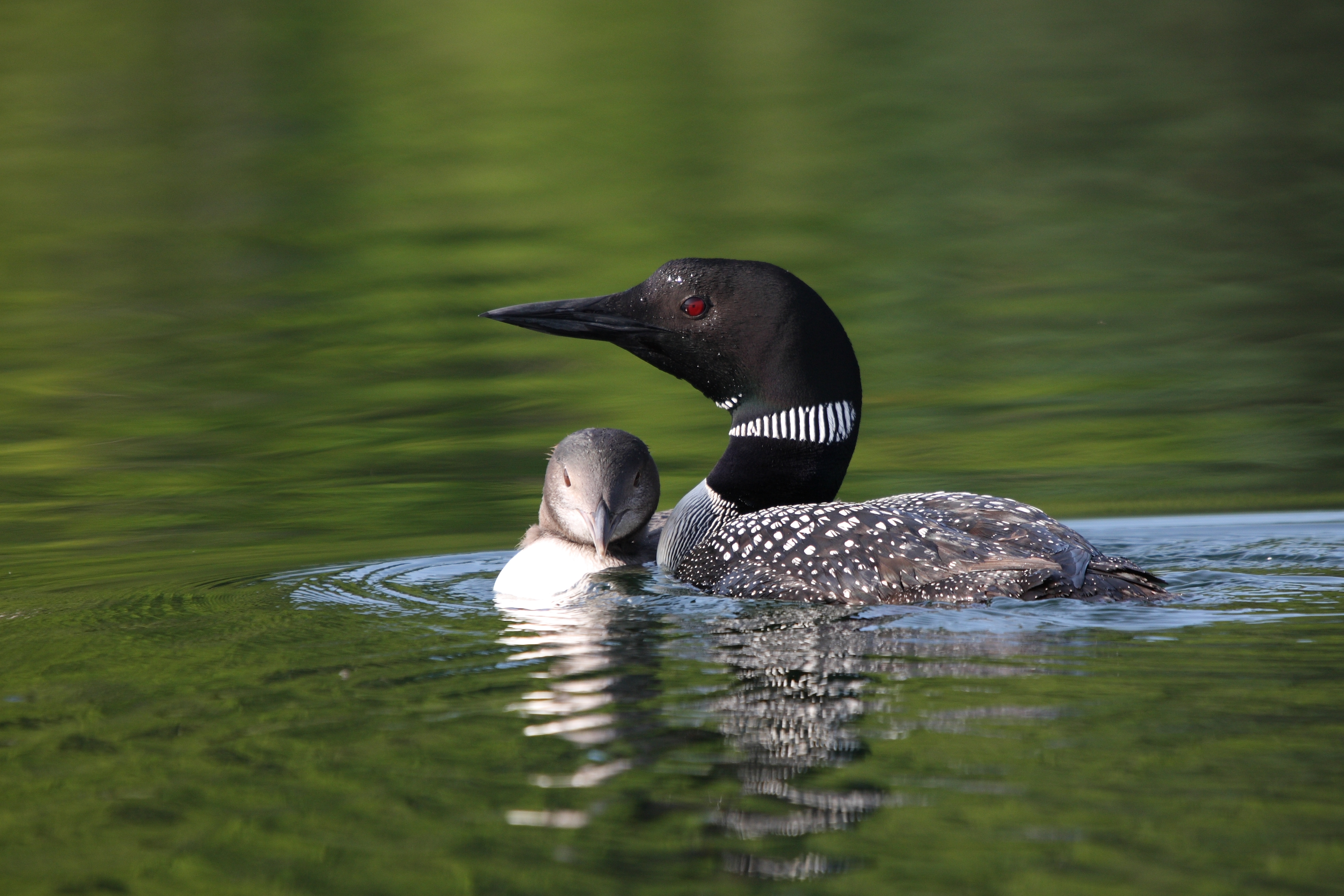
Loon (Gavia Immer)

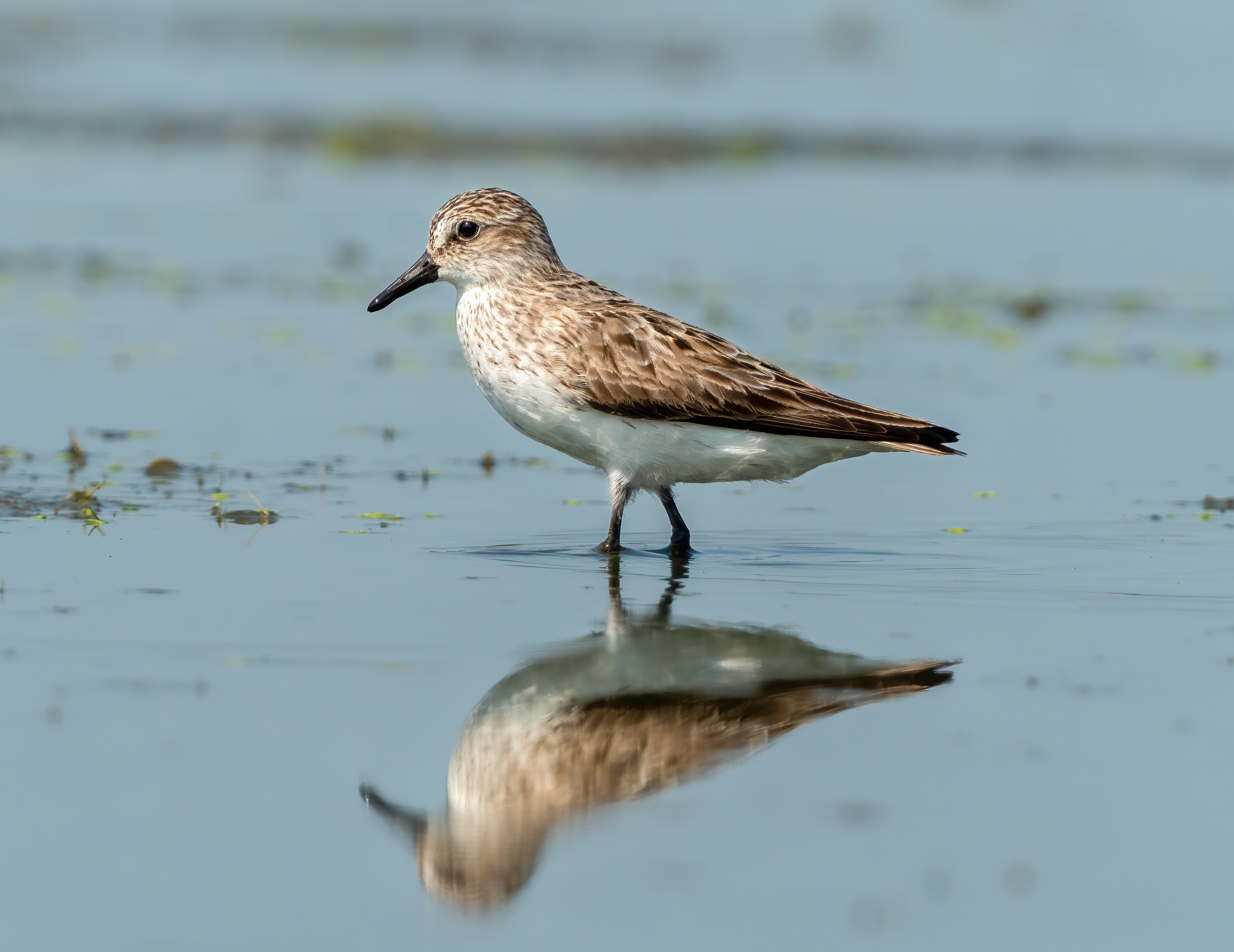
Wader (Charadriiformes)

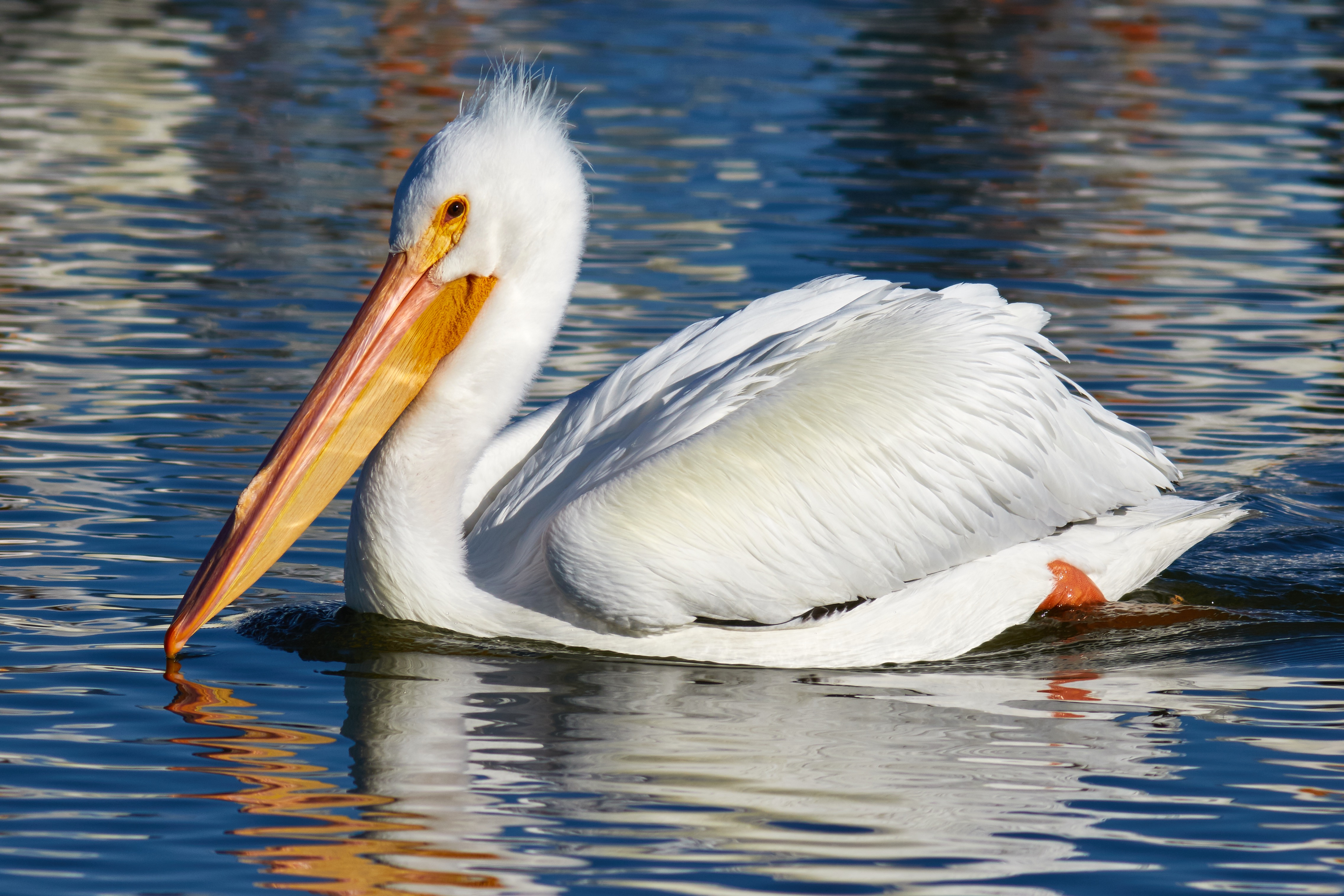
White American Pelican ( Pelecanus erythrorhynchos)

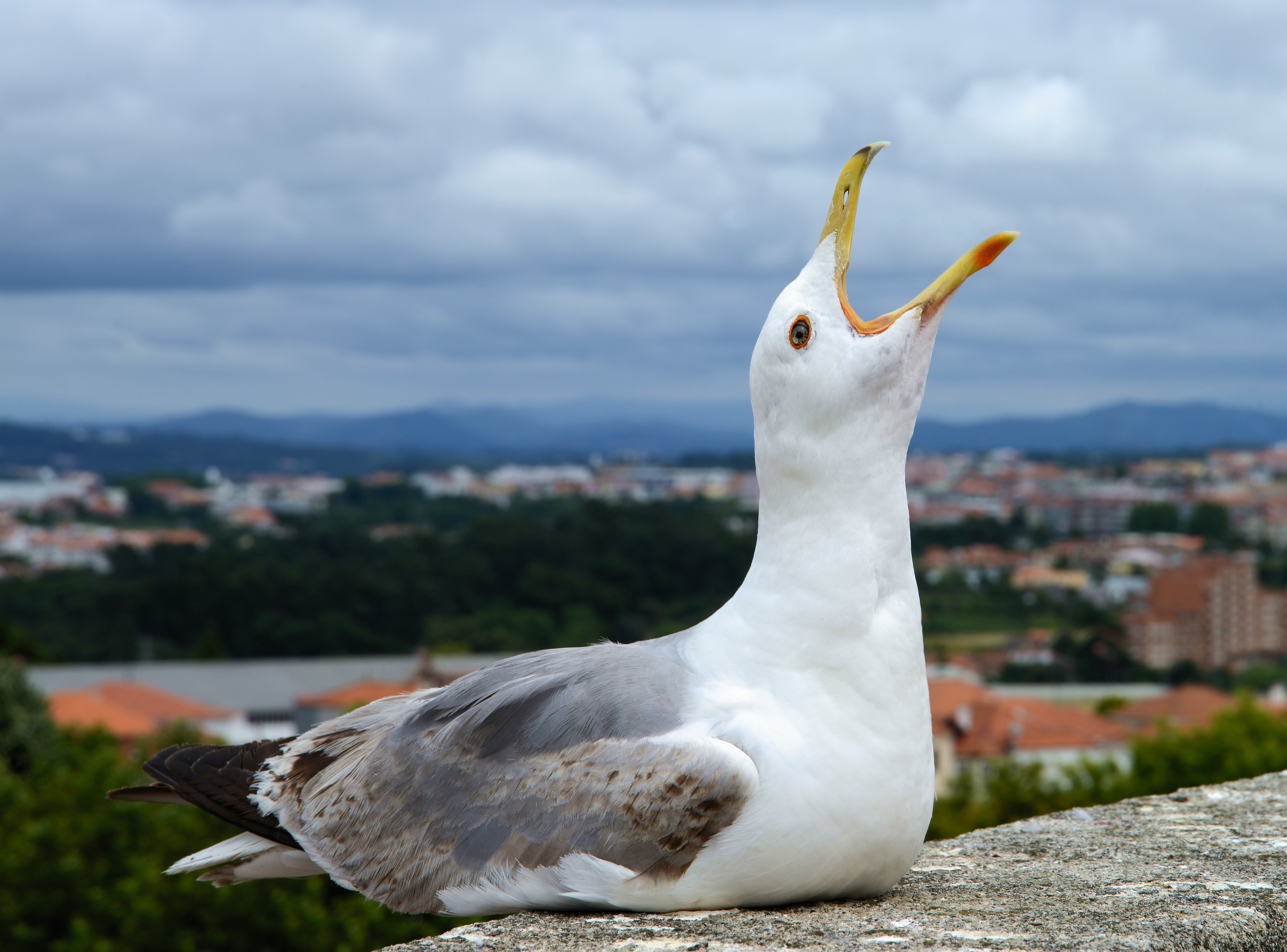
Gull (Larus)

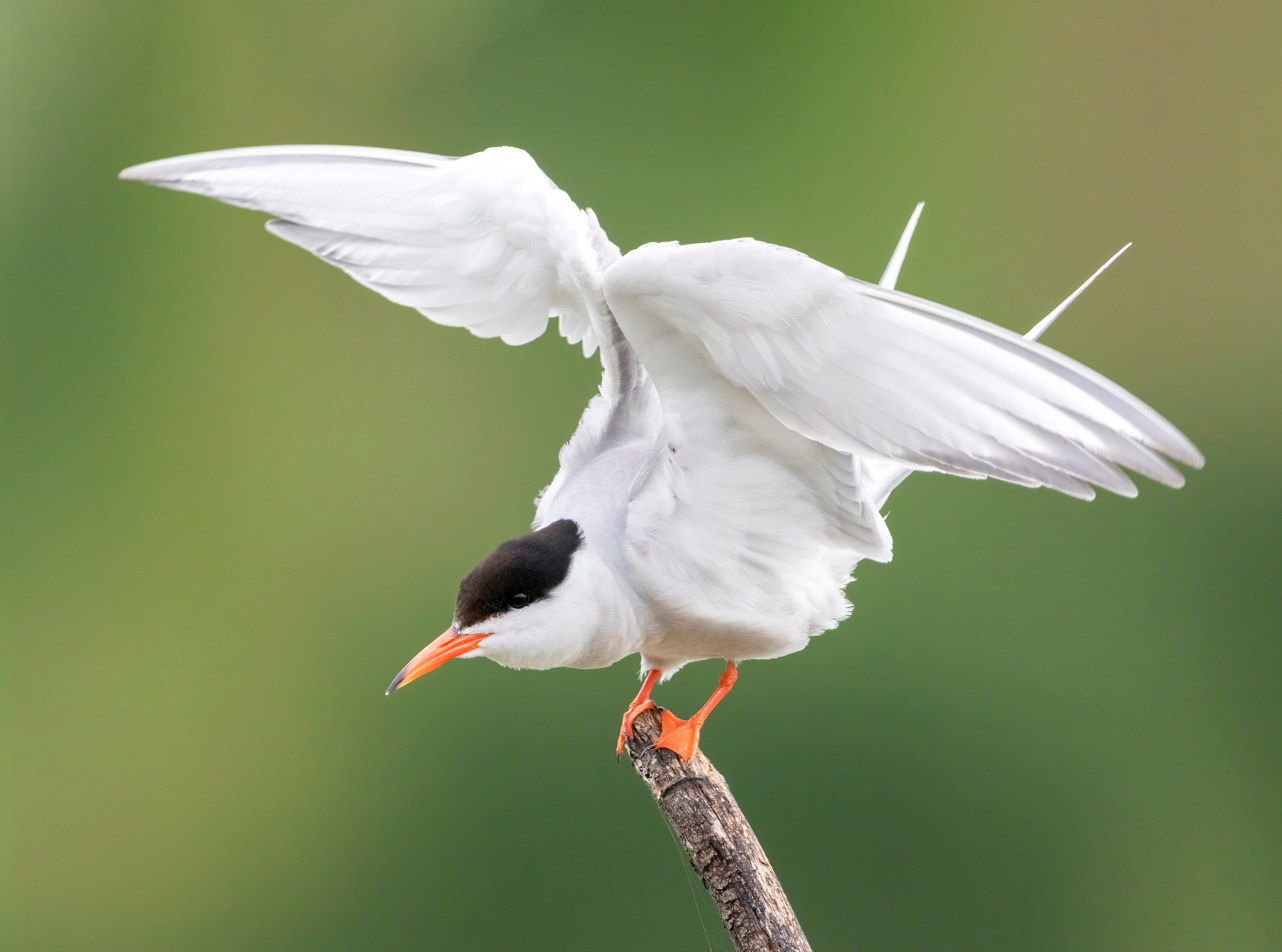
Tern (Sternidae)

The reservoir is a popular fishing spot, home to a variety of species including Striped bass, White bass, Largemouth bass, Smallmouth bass White Crappie, Bluegill, Walleye, Channel catfish, and Blue Catfish.

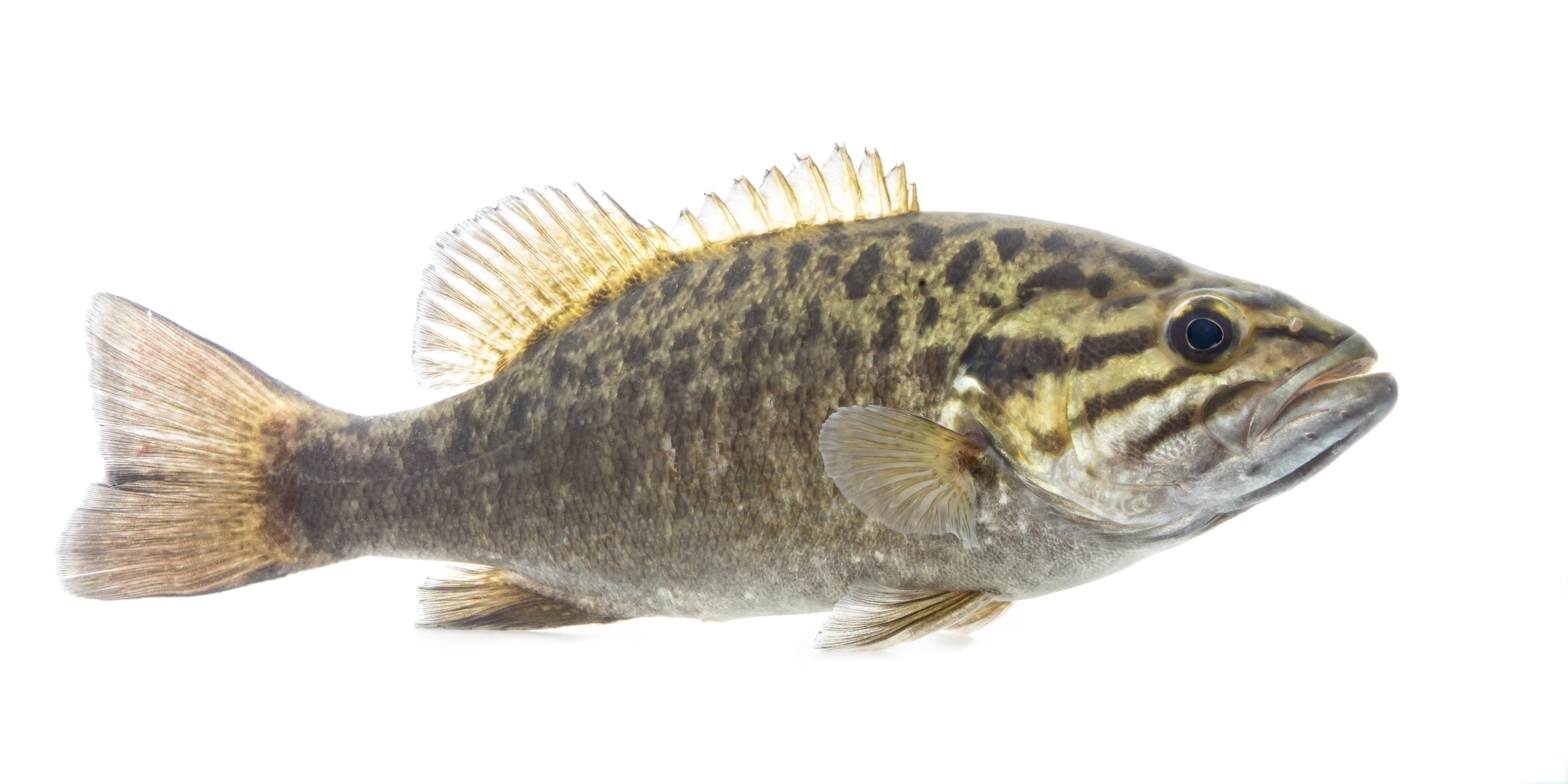
Smallmouth Bass (Micropterus dolomieu)

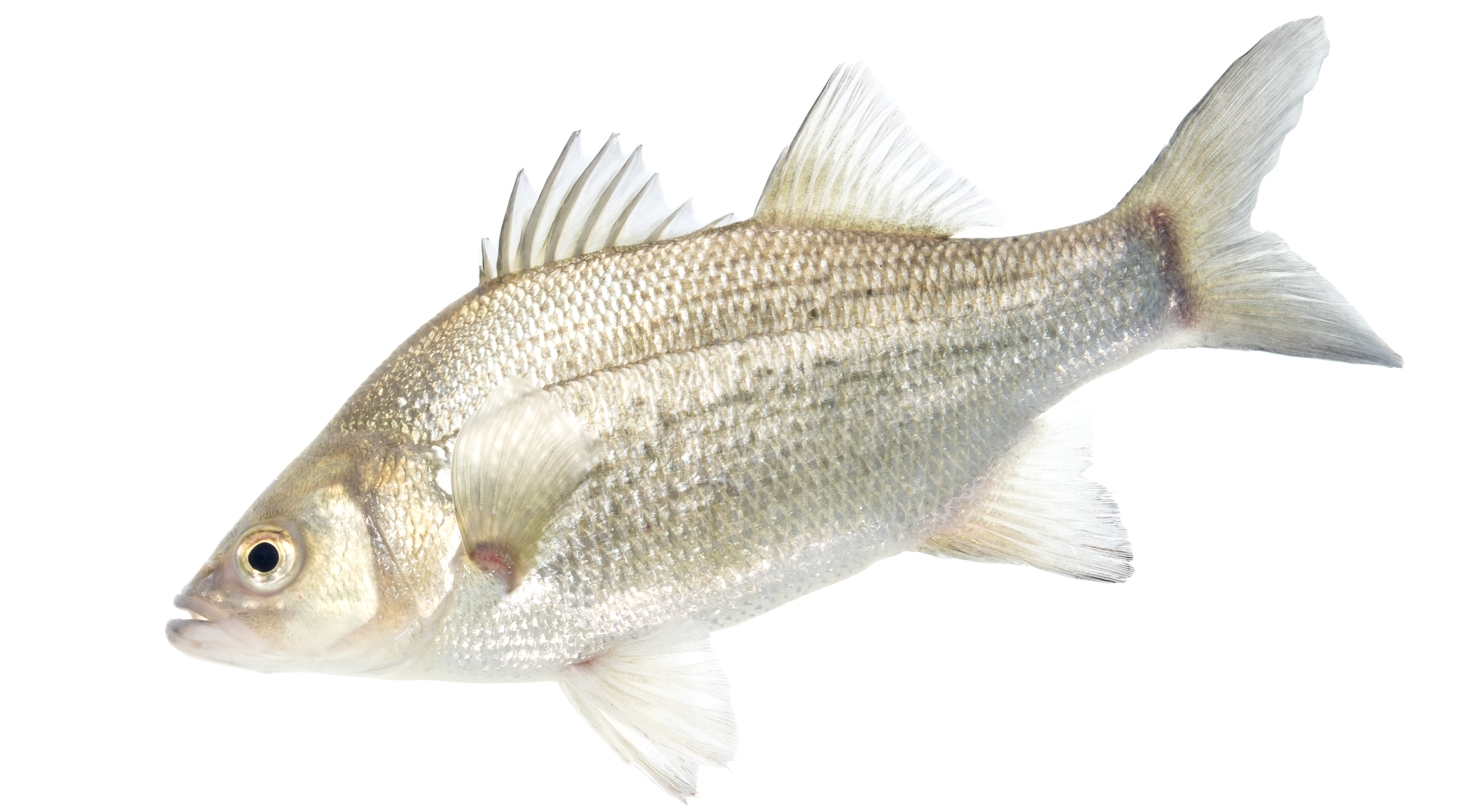
White Bass (Morone chrysops)

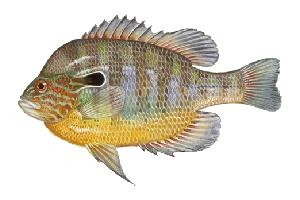
Bluegill (Lepomis macrochirus)

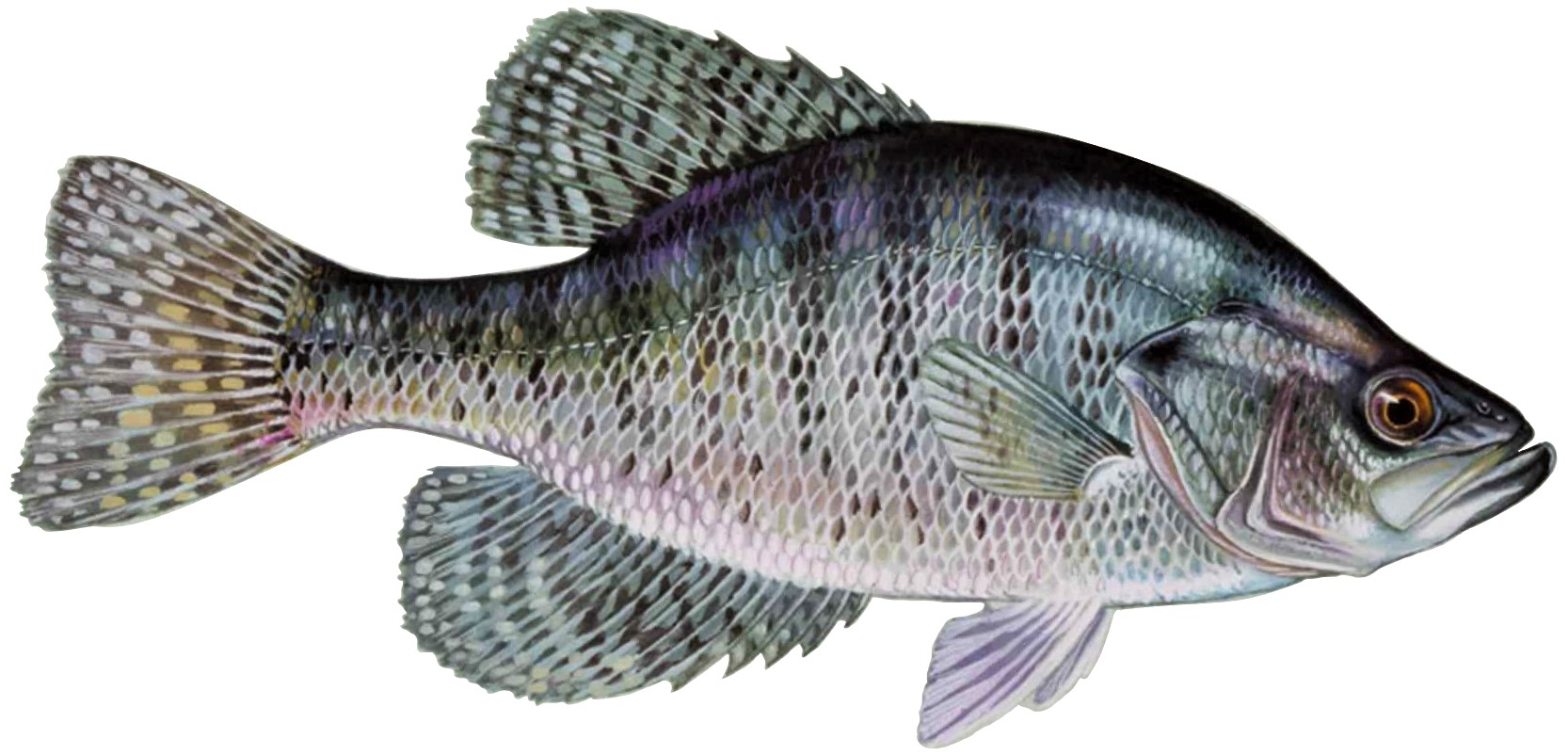
White Crappie (pomoxis annularis)

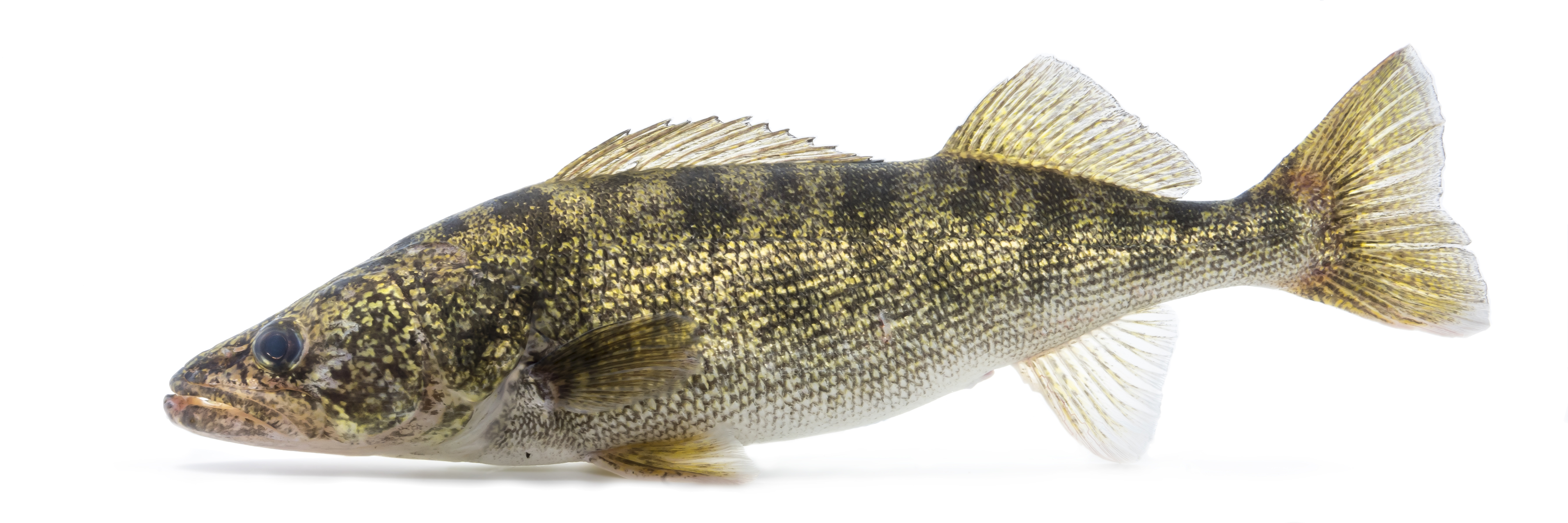
Walleye (Sander vitreus)

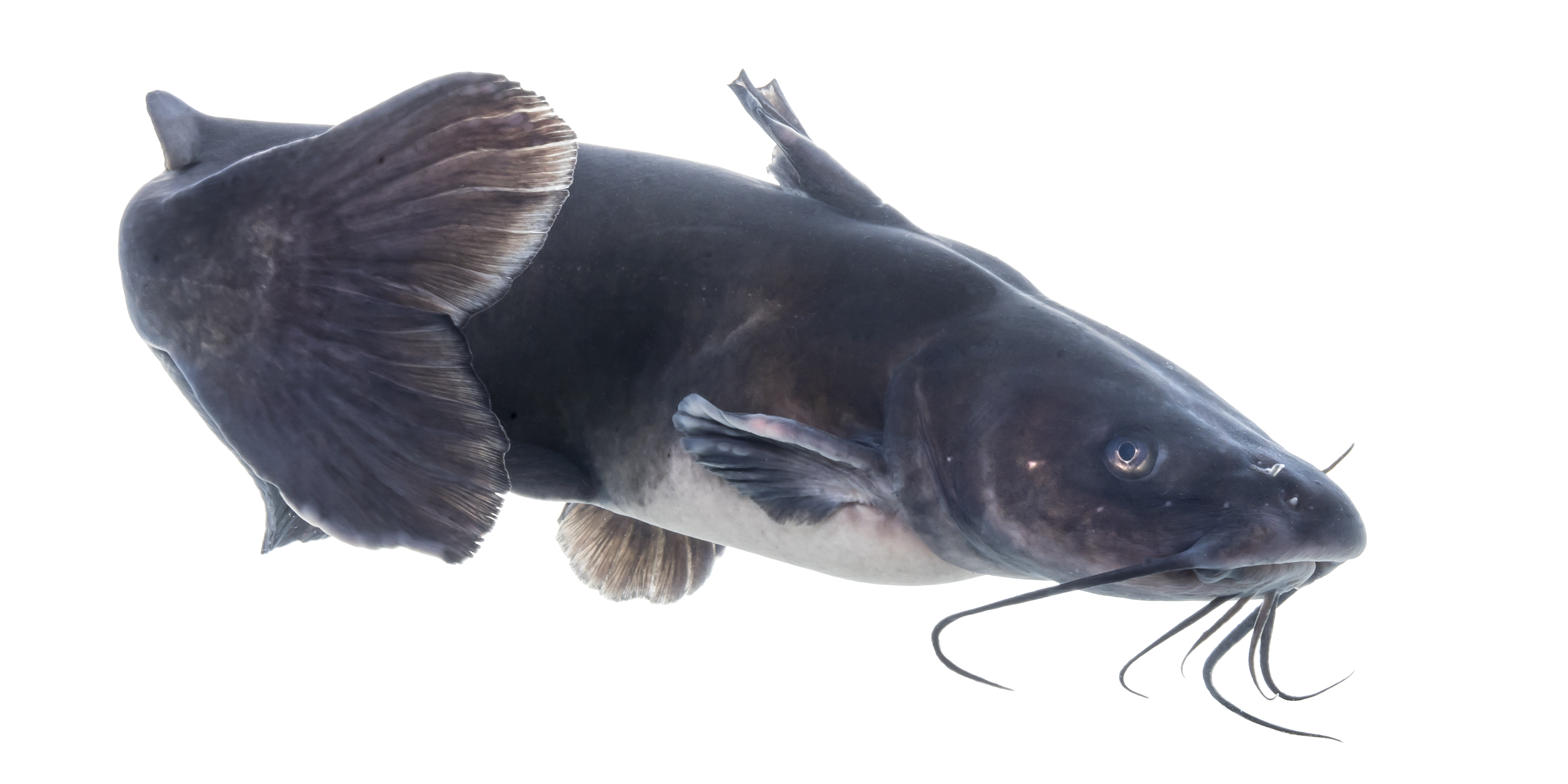
Channel Catfish (Ictalurus punctatus)

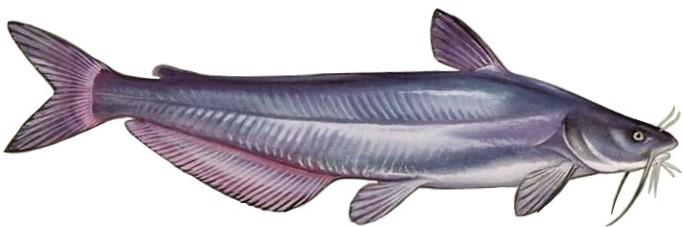
Blue catfish (ictalurus furcatus)

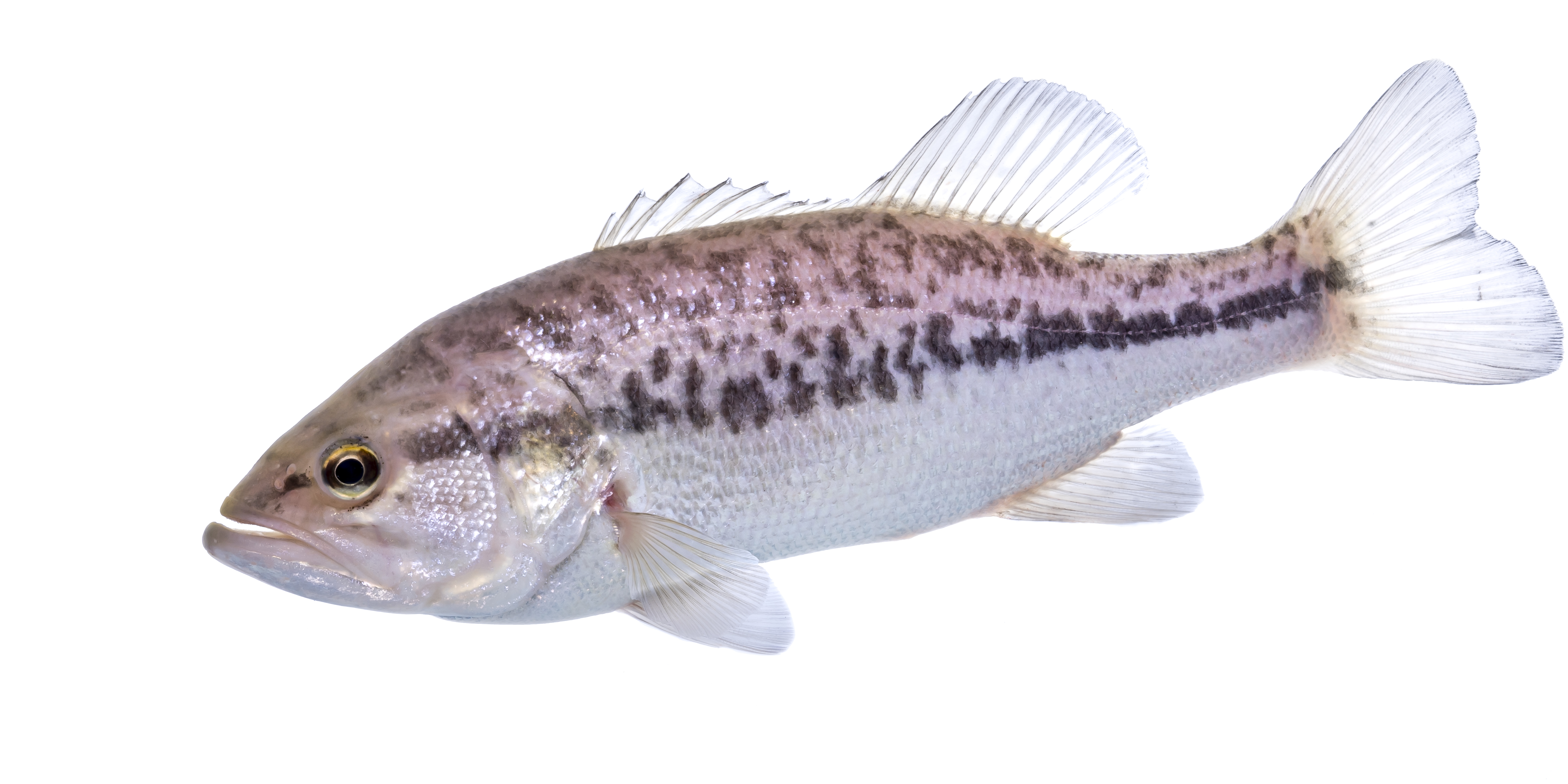
Largemouth Bass (Micropterus salmoides)

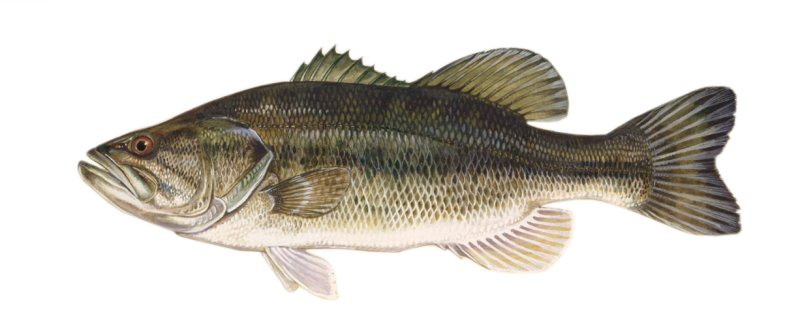
Black Bass (Micropterus)

== Gallery ==
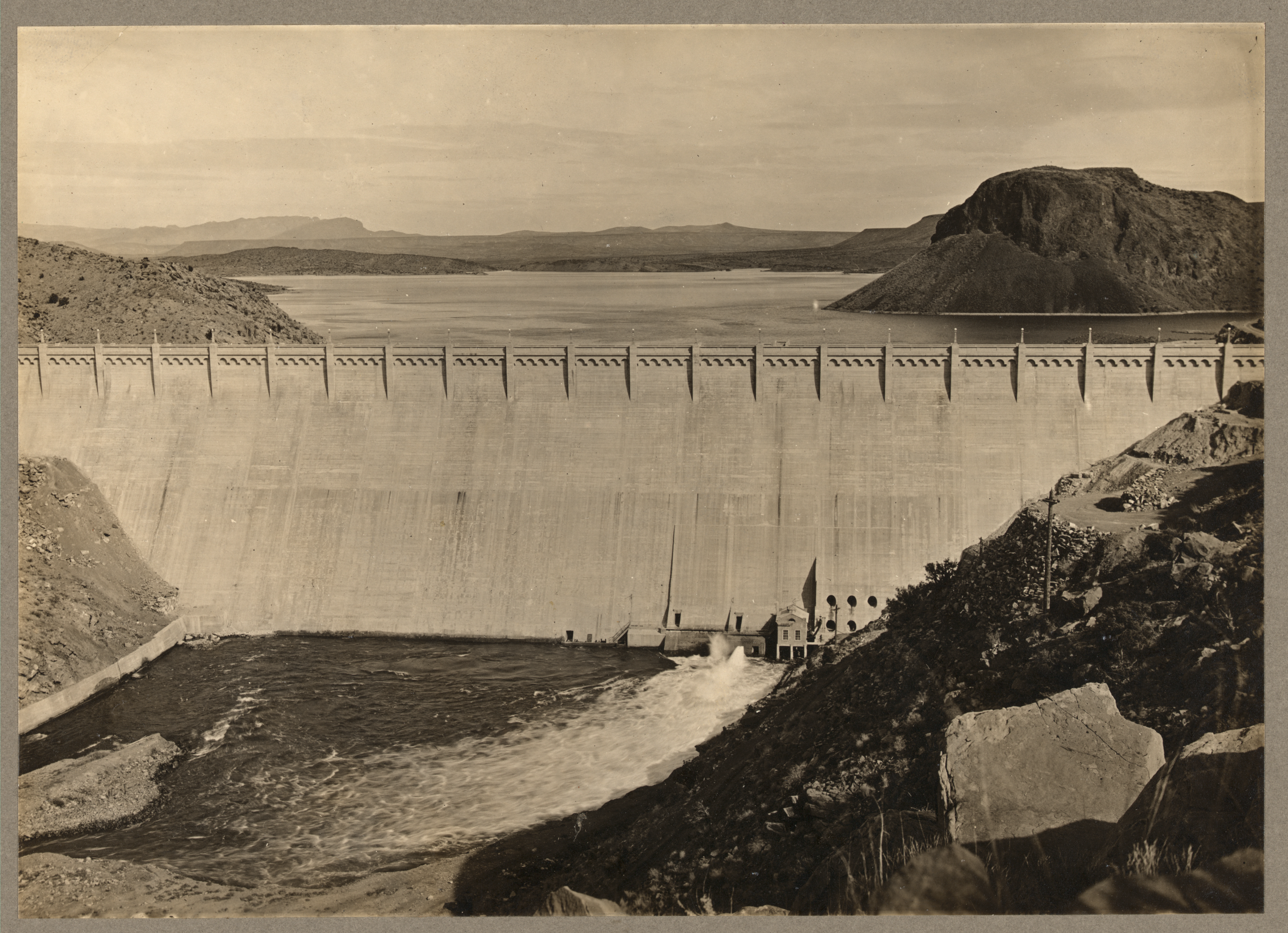
The dam at Elephant Butte Reservoir in 1916, before the 1944 highstand.

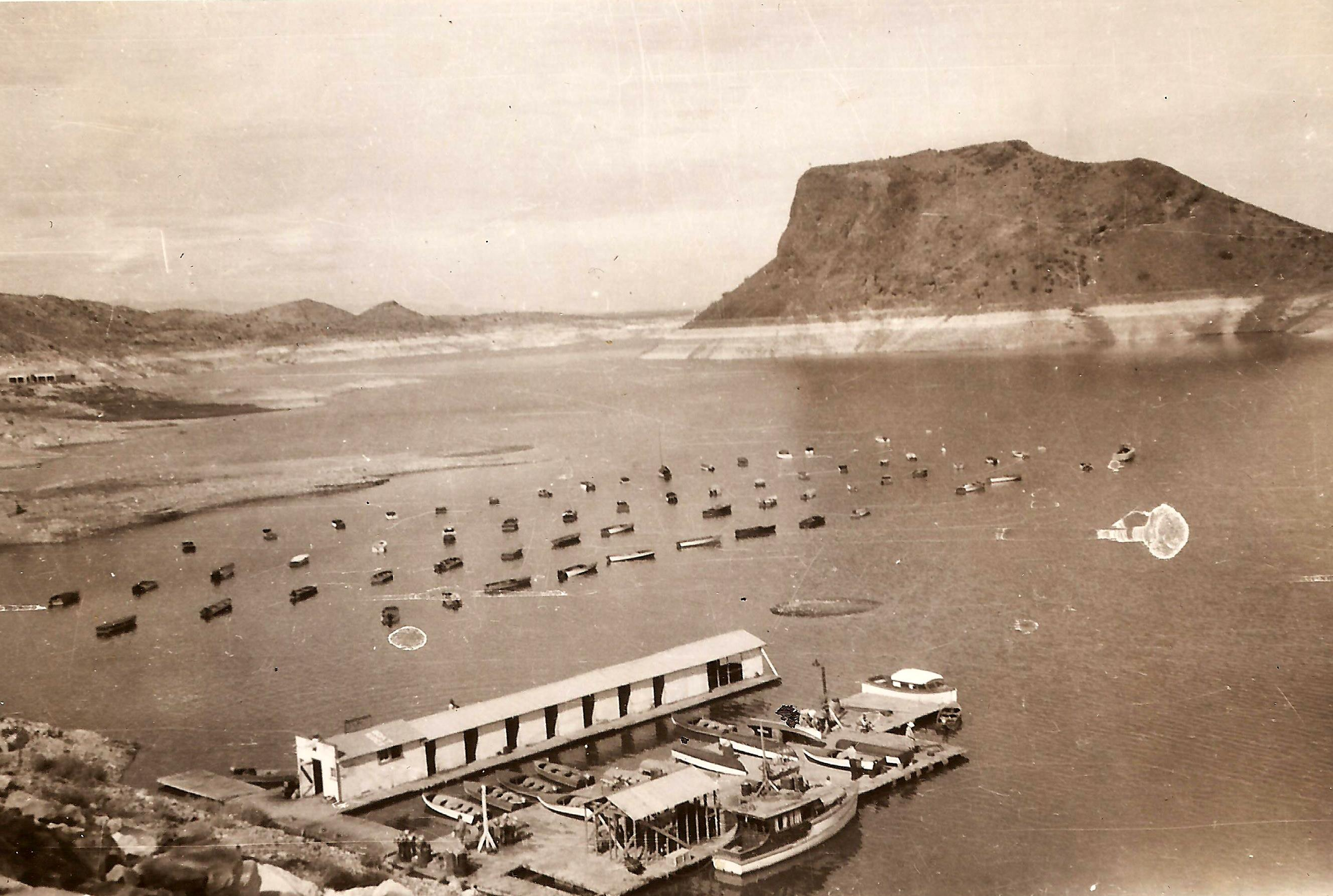
Elephant Butte Reservoir in 1946 after the highstand. Note the mineral stains on the hillsides created just two years prior.
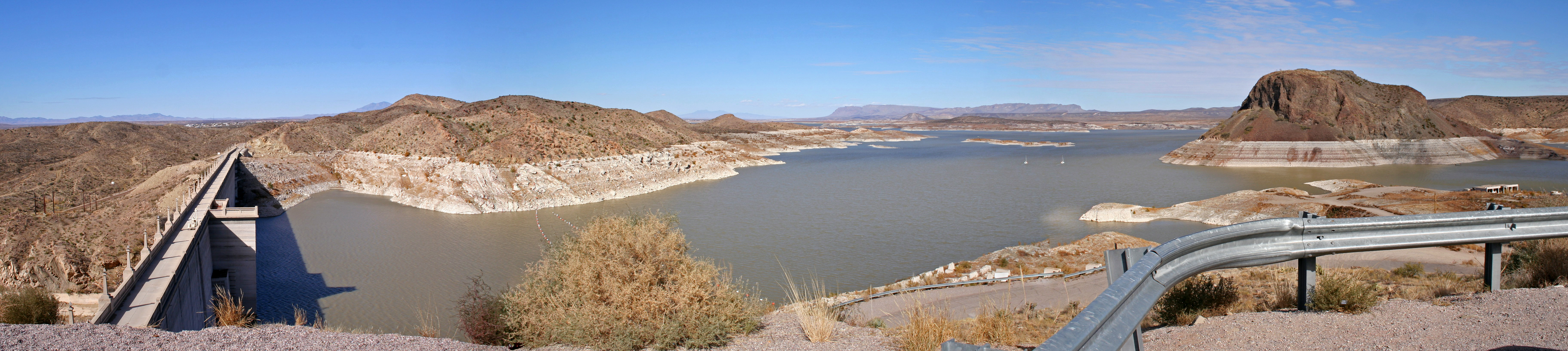
Panoramic view of Elephant Butte Reservoir in 2005
