= Alamosa Creek =

- Location of mouth

Location
- Country: United States
- State: New Mexico
- Counties: Socorro, Sierra

Physical characteristics
- Source
  - coordinates: 33°49′13″N 107°38′43″W
  - elevation: 7,600 ft (2,300 m)
- Mouth
  - location: Elephant Butte Reservoir
  - coordinates: 33°18′19″N 107°12′34″W

Basin features
- River system: Rio Grande

Alamosa Creek, also known as Alamosa Arroyo and Alamosa River, is a tributary stream of the Rio Grande in Socorro and Sierra County, New Mexico. Alamosa Creek has its source at 33°49′13″N 107°38′43″W at an elevation of 7600 ft / 2,316 meters on the western slope of the San Mateo Mountains in Soccoro. Its mouth was originally at its confluence with the Rio Grande, before that river was flooded by the Elephant Butte Reservoir created by the Elephant Butte Dam. Its mouth is now on the western edge of that reservoir at the mouth of Monticello Canyon.
